= Sunrise (disambiguation) =

Sunrise is the instant at which the upper edge of the Sun appears above the horizon in the east.

Sunrise may also refer to:

== Organizations ==
- Sunrise Movement, a U.S. youth-led climate activism organization
- Sunrise Community, Inc., a nonprofit offering services for adults with intellectual and developmental disabilities
- Sunrise Senior Living, an operator of senior living communities

== Places ==
=== Canada ===
- Camp Sunrise, a Salvation Army camp near Gibsons in British Columbia
- Northern Sunrise County, Alberta
- Sunrise Lake (Vancouver Island), British Columbia

=== United States ===
==== Populated places ====
- Sunrise, Alaska, a census-designated place
- Sunrise, Florida, a city
- Sunrise, Long Beach, California, a neighborhood
- Sunrise Township, Chisago County, Minnesota, a township
  - Sunrise, Minnesota, an unincorporated community in Sunrise Township
- Sunrise, Virginia, an unincorporated community
- Sunrise, West Virginia, an unincorporated community

==== Other places in the United States ====
- Sunrise (Charleston, West Virginia), a 1905 historic home
- Sunrise (Gore, Virginia), an 1818 historic home
- Sunrise (Mount Rainier), a visitor center and lodge in Mount Rainier National Park, Washington
- Sunrise, Wyoming, a historic company mining town
- Sunrise Colony, a communal living experiment in Michigan from 1933 to 1936
- Sunrise Glacier (Alaska), a glacier of the Alaska Range
- Sunrise Glacier (Montana), a mountain glacier
- Sunrise Historic District, a community in Washington state
- Sunrise Lake (New Hampshire)
- Sunrise Mountain (Nevada), a peak
- Sunrise Mountain (New Jersey), a peak of the Kittatinny Mountains
- Sunrise River, Minnesota
- Sunrise Theatre, Fort Pierce, Florida
- Sunrise Peak, a mountain in Washington state

== People ==
- Sunrise Adams (born 1982), American pornographic actress

== Literature ==
- Sunrise (play)
- Sunrise (magazine), a journal of the Theosophical Society Pasadena
- Sunrise (novel), a 2009 novel in the Warriors: Power of Three series by Erin Hunter
- Sunrise, a 1937 book by Grace Livingston Hill
- Sunrise, a 1984 novel by Rosie Thomas

== Film ==
- Sunrise (1926 film), an Australian silent film co-directed by Raymond Longford and F. Stuart-Whyte
- Sunrise: A Song of Two Humans, a 1927 American silent film starring Janet Gaynor, directed by F. W. Murnau; often referred to simply as "Sunrise"
- Sunrise (2014 film), a Marathi drama by Partho Sen-Gupta
- Sunrise (2024 film), directed by Andrew Baird

== Radio ==
- Sunrise Radio Group, a UK radio broadcaster
  - Sunrise Radio, an AM station in London
  - Sunrise Radio (Yorkshire), an FM station in Bradford
- Sunrise Radio (Ireland), an FM station in Dublin

== Television ==
- Sunrise (Australian TV program), an Australian morning show that premiered on Seven Network in 1991
- Sunrise (New Zealand TV programme), a 2007–2010 New Zealand breakfast news show that aired on TV3
- Sunrise (UK TV programme), a 1989–2019 UK morning show that aired on Sky News
- "Sunrise" (How I Met Your Mother), a 2014 episode of the TV series How I Met Your Mother
- "Sunrise" (The Twilight Zone), a 2003 episode of the TV series The Twilight Zone (2002–2003)
- Sunrise, the original name for the UK Breakfast Television station GMTV

== Music ==
=== Classical ===
- Sunrise (opera), 2015 opera by Jin Xiang after the 1936 play by Cao Yu
- String Quartet, Op. 76, No. 4 by Joseph Haydn, nicknamed "Sunrise"
- "Sunrise", the introduction to Also sprach Zarathustra by Richard Strauss

=== Bands ===
- Sunrise (Finnish band), a Finnish rock band later known as Sunrise Avenue
- Sunrise (German band), a German pop band in the late 1970s
- Sunrise (Ukrainian band), a Ukrainian power metal band

=== Albums ===
- Sunrise (Day6 album), 2017
- Sunrise (Elvis Presley album), 1999
- Sunrise (Fish Leong album), 2002
- Sunrise (Idoling!!! album), 2010
- Sunrise (Jimmy Ruffin album), 1980
- Sunrise (Paulinho da Costa album), 1984
- Sunrise (Robben Ford album), 1999
- Sunrise (Shelby Lynne album), 1989
- Sunrise, by Circle, 2002
- Sunrise, by Eire Apparent, 1969
- Sunrise, by Mick Softley, 1970
- Sunrise, by Sam Feldt, 2017
- Sunrise, half of the Coldplay album Everyday Life, 2019
- The Sunrise EP, by Cause and Effect, 2003

=== Songs ===
- "Sunrise" (Eric Carmen song), 1975
- "Sunrise" (Alexandra Joner song), featuring Madcon, 2012
- "Sunrise" (Caroline song), 2006
- "Sunrise" (The Divine Comedy song), 1998
- "Sunrise" (GFriend song), 2019
- "Sunrise" (Infernal song), 2000
- "Sunrise" (Irene Nelson song), 2010
- "Sunrise" (Joe Bermudez song), 2016
- "Sunrise" (Norah Jones song), 2004
- "Sunrise" (Simply Red song), 2003
- "Sunrise" (Uriah Heep song), 1972, from The Magician's Birthday
- "Sunrise" (Morgan Wallen song), 2023, from One Thing at a Time
- "(Reach Up for The) Sunrise", a 2004 song by Duran Duran
- "Sunrise"/"Sunset (Love Is All)", double A-side single by Ayumi Hamasaki
- "Sunrise/The Trees", double A-side single by Pulp
- "Sunrise" (Forrest Frank song), 2025
- "Sunrise", by Coldplay from Everyday Life
- "Sunrise", by Childish Gambino from Camp
- "Sunrise", by The Afters from Live On Forever
- "Sunrise", by Angel City from Love Me Right
- "Sunrise", by Ateez from Treasure EP.Fin: All to Action
- "Sunrise", by Barry Manilow from Even Now (Barry Manilow album)
- "Sunrise", by The Cataracs
- "Sunrise", by Dannii Minogue from Club Disco
- "Sunrise", by Dave Holland from Jumpin' In
- "Sunrise", by Grateful Dead from Terrapin Station
- "Sunrise", by Ice House from Man of Colours
- "Sunrise", by Jagged Edge from Baby Makin' Project
- "Sunrise", by New Order from Low-Life
- "Sunrise", by Puffy AmiYumi from 59
- "Sunrise", by Rascal Flatts from Changed
- "Sunrise", by Scooter from Push the Beat for This Jam (The Second Chapter)
- "Sunrise", by Snoop Dogg from Bible of Love
- "Sunrise", by Spirit from Spirit of '76
- "Sunrise", by Susumu Hirasawa from Detonator Orgun 2
- "Sunrise", by The Who from The Who Sell Out
- "Sunrise", by Yeasayer from All Hour Cymbals
- "Sunrise (Al Amanecer)", from the musical In the Heights

=== Other uses in music ===
- Sunrise Records, RCA subsidiary in the 1930s, sister label to Bluebird Records

== Science ==
- Sunrise (telescope), a balloon-borne solar telescope
- SunRISE, Sun Radio Interferometer Space Experiment, a NASA heliophysics mission
- Sunrise period, period of time after the launch of a new top-level or second-level Internet domain

== Transport and aircraft ==
- Sunrise station, a Sacramento Regional Transit District light-rail station in Rancho Cordova, California, US
- AstroFlight Sunrise, an American solar-powered experimental aircraft
- Bautek Sunrise, a German hang glider
- Empire Lad, a British Government Empire ship later renamed Sunrise
- Sunrise Airways, a Haitian airline
- Sunrise (Belgium), a Belgian defunct airline

== Companies ==
- Sunrise (studio), a Japanese animation studio
- Sunrise Records, Canadian music retailer
- Sunrise LLC, a Swiss telecommunications company
- Sunrise Senior Living, an American retirement-home company
- Sunrise Calendar, a calendar application for mobile and desktop

== See also ==
- Sunrise service, a Christian worship service on Easter
- Tequila Sunrise (cocktail), an alcoholic drink
- Operation Sunrise (disambiguation)
- Project Sunrise (disambiguation)
- Sunrise Beach (disambiguation)
- Sunrise FM (disambiguation)
- Sunrise Lake (disambiguation)
- Sunrise Movement, a youth environmentalism group
- The Sun Rising (disambiguation)
- Sunset and Sunrise (disambiguation)
- Sunset (disambiguation)
