= Yuan Ye =

Yuan Ye or Yuanye may refer to:

== People ==
- Yuan Ye (emperor) (509–532, "reigned" 531–532), puppet emperor of the Northern Wei dynasty
- Yuan Ye (speed skater) (born 1979), Chinese speed skater
- Yuan Ye (footballer) (born 1993), Chinese footballer
- Yuan Ye (chess player) (born 2000), Chinese chess player
- Cuttlefish That Loves Diving, Chinese web novelist

== Others ==
- The Craft of Gardens, 1631 Chinese book by Ji Cheng
- The Wilderness (play), 1936 Chinese play by Cao Yu
  - The Savage Land (film), 1981 film adaptation of Cao Yu's play
  - The Savage Land (opera), 1987 Chinese-language western opera based on Cao Yu's play
