= Savage Land (disambiguation) =

Savage Land is a hidden prehistoric land in Marvel comic books.

Savage Land or The Savage Land may also refer to:

- Savage Land (film), a 1994 western film
- Savage Land (album), a 1999 album by Mob Rules
- The Wilderness (play), a 1936 Chinese play by Cao Yu, also translated as The Savage Land
  - The Savage Land (film), a 1981 film adaptation of Cao Yu's play
  - The Savage Land (opera), a 1987 Chinese-language western opera based on Cao Yu's play
