= Sunrise (opera) =

Opera by Jin Xiang

NCPA premiere official poster

Sunrise (日出) is a 2015 Chinese contemporary classical opera by Jin Xiang to a libretto by Wan Fang after her father Cao Yu's 1936 play of the same name. Jin Xiang had previously cooperated with Wan Fang to set another of her father's plays as the opera The Savage Land.
