= Tequila (disambiguation) =

Tequila is an alcoholic drink made from agave juice.

Tequila may also refer to:

== Places ==
- Tequila, Jalisco, the town in Mexico where the drink was invented
- Tequila, Veracruz, a municipality in Mexico

== Music ==
- Tequila (band), a Spanish rock group of the 1970s–1980s
- TeQuila (born 1985), Namibian singer

=== Albums ===
- Tequila (Brand New Sin album) (2006)
- Tequila (Wes Montgomery album) (1966)

=== Songs ===
- "Tequila" (Ally Brooke song), 2022
- "Tequila" (The Champs song), 1958
- "Tequila" (Dan + Shay song), 2018
- "Tequila" (Jax Jones, Martin Solveig and Raye song), 2020
- "Tequila" (Terrorvision song), 1999
- "Tequila", a song by Korpiklaani from Ukon Wacka, 2011
- "Tequila", a song by Kurupt from Tha Streetz Iz a Mutha, 1999
- "Tequila," a song by Idiot Flesh from The Nothing Show, 1994

== People with the name ==
- Tila Tequila or Tila Nguyen (born 1981), Vietnamese-American model

=== Fictional characters ===
- Tequila Marjoram, a character in the Galaxy Angel series
- Tequila Yuen, a character in the movie Hard Boiled and the video game Stranglehold

== Other uses ==
- Tequila Works, defunct Spanish video game studio
- "Tequila" (ALF), a 1988 television episode

== See also ==
- "Teqkilla", a song by M.I.A.
- Tequila Sunrise (disambiguation)
