= Sunset and Sunrise =

'Sunset and Sunrise', 'Sunrise to Sunset', 'Sunrise, Sunset', 'Sunset/Sunrise', and, similar terms, may refer to:

- Sunrise and Sunset, the start and end points of the daily Sun path

== Film ==
- Sunset and Sunrise (film) (Arabic: غروب وشروق, romanized: Ghoroub wa Shorouq), 1970 Egyptian political film
- Sunset, Sunrise (1973 film) (Japanese: 陽は沈み陽は昇る, romanized: Hi wa shizumi hi wa noboru), by Koreyoshi Kurahara
- Sunrise/Sunset, a 2008 Saudi film; see Cinema of Saudi Arabia
- Sunrise Sunset (Japanese: サンライズ・サンセット, romanized: Sanraizu Sansetto), 2013 film directed by Ryōsuke Hashiguchi
- Sunset Sunrise (Japanese: サンセット・サンライズ), a 2025 Japanese film; shown at the 37th Tokyo International Film Festival

== Television ==
- "Sunrise, Sunset" (What We Do in the Shadows), 2022 season 4 number 10 episode 40 of U.S. comedy horror mockumentary fantasy TV show What We Do in the Shadows
- "Sunrise, Sunset" (Schitt's Creek), 2020 season 6 number 10 episode 76 of TV sitcom Schitt's Creek
- "Sunrise, Sunset", 2015 episode 13 of The Night Shift season 2
- "Sunrise, Sunset", 2013 episode 10 of Princesses: Long Island
- "Sunrise, Sunset", 2012 season 2 episode of Dinosaur Train; see List of Dinosaur Train episodes
- "Sunrise, Sunset", 2007 season 2 number 13 episode 30 of Gina D's Kids Club
- "Sunrise, Sunset", 1998 season 3 episode of Magic Adventures of Mumfie
- "Sunrise, Sunset", 1989 episode 5 of Dallas (1978 TV series) season 13
- "Sunrise, Sunset", 1987 episode 42 of BraveStarr

== Music ==
=== Albums ===
- Sunrise to Sunset, a 2017 double album by Sam Feldt
- Sunset Sunrise, a 2017 album by Rozalind MacPhail
- Sunset Sunrise, a 2013 album by In the Country
- Sunset/Sunrise, 2009 album by U.S. folk band The Dutchess and the Duke
- "Sunrise/Sunset (Love Is All)", 2009 single album by Ayumi Hamasaki containing the songs "Sunrise" and "Sunset"
- Underground Rise, Volume 1: Sunrise/Sunset, 2003 compilation album by Uprok Records
- Sunrise Sunset, a 1990 album by Bob Thiele Collective
- Sunrise Sunset, a 1988 album by Grażyna Auguścik
- Sunrise, Sunset, a 1979 album by Roland Hanna
- Sunrise, Sunset, a 1973 compilation album by Tony Bennett

=== Songs ===
- "Sunrise-Sunset", a 1956 song by Oscar Pettiford off the album The Oscar Pettiford Orchestra in Hi-Fi
- "Forest Flower: Sunrise/Sunset", a 1963 song by Chico Hamilton off the album Man from Two Worlds
- "Sunrise, Sunset", a 1964 song from the stage musical Fiddler on the Roof
- "Sunrise, Sunset", a 1965 song by Miriam Makeba off the album The Magic of Makeba
- "Sunrise, Sunset", a 1967 song by Ed Ames off the album Time, Time
- "Medicine Man" / "Sunrise Sunset", a 1971 single by Phillip Goodhand-Tait
- "Sunrise Sunset", a 1986 single by Fat Larry's Band
- "Forest Flower: Sunrise/Sunset", a 1999 song by Charles Lloyd off the album Voice in the Night
- "Sunrise/Sunset", a 2003 song by CunninLynguists off the album SouthernUnderground
- "Sunrise Sunset", a 2007 song by New Years Day off the album My Dear
- "Sunset to Sunrise", a 2007 single by CamelPhat
- "Sunrise, Sunset", a 2000 song by Bright Eyes off the album Fevers and Mirrors
- "Sunrise Sunset", a 2000 song by Candy Lo off the album Sik Fong
- "Sunset Sunrise", a 2008 song by Grace Jones off the album Hurricane
- "Sunrise Sunset", 2009 song by Pugwash off the album Giddy (album)
- "Sunrise Sunset", 2015 song by Erik Friedlander off the album Oscalypso
- "Sunrise Sunset", a 2017 single by Benny Cassette
- "Sunrise Sunset", a 2018 single by J. Brown (American singer)
- "Sunset Sunrise", a 2020 song by Yung Lean off the album Starz ('Yung Lean' album)
- "Sunset Sunrise", a 2021 song by Vildhjarta off the album Måsstaden under vatten

== Places and fictional locations ==
- Sunrise-Sunset Road, Jeju Civilian-Military Complex Port for Beautiful Tourism, Jeju Island, South Korea
- Sunset/Sunrise, a fictional world in World of Awe fictional universe created by Yael Kanarek

== Literature ==
- "Scene 67: 'Sunrise Sunset'", a serial chapter of the serialized Japanese manga comic Dear Boys; see List of Dear Boys chapters
- "From Sunset to Sunrise" (Italian: Dal tramonto all'alba), serial chapter 20 of the serialized Italian comic Angel's Friends
- His Sunrise My Sunset, a 2016 romance novel by Jan Hurst

== Other uses ==
- "Sunrise, Sunset", a 2017 exhibition by artist Paula Wilson
- "Sunrise Sunset", a 1991 artwork by Norman P. Hines; see List of public art in Palm Desert, California, USA

== See also ==
- Tora-san's Sunrise and Sunset, 1976 Japanese comedy film
- "Sunrise, Sunburn, Sunset", 2017 song and 2018 single by Luke Bryan off the country music album What Makes You Country
- Everyday Life ('Coldplay' album), 2019 double album by Coldplay, containing the albums Sunrise and Sunset
- "Sunset, Sunrise, Sunset", a kinetic sculpture by Alexandre da Cunha at Battersea Power Station tube station
