= The Sun Rises =

The Sun Rises may refer to:

- The Sun Rises (1954 film), a Romanian drama film
- The Sun Rises (1934 film), a German musical film

== See also ==
- Sunrise (disambiguation)
