= Tequila Sunrise =

Tequila Sunrise may refer to:

- Tequila sunrise, an alcoholic mixed drink
- Tequila Sunrise (film), a 1988 film
- "Tequila Sunrise" (Eagles song), 1973
- "Tequila Sunrise" (Cypress Hill song), 1998
- "Tequila Sunrise" (Entourage), an episode of the TV series Entourage
- "Tequila Sunrise", a 2019 song by Jackson Wang and Higher Brothers from Head in the Clouds II
- "Tequila Sunrise", a 1976 song and 2002 album by Annie Whittle
- Tequila sunrise, a uniform worn by the Houston Astros

== See also ==
- Tequila (disambiguation)
- Sunrise (disambiguation)
- To Kill a Sunrise, 2021 album by Kota the Friend feat. Statik Selektah
