= Sunrise Lake =

Sunrise Lake may refer to a location in North America:

Water bodies:

- Sunrise Lake (New Hampshire), United States
- Sunrise Lake (Vancouver Island), British Columbia, Canada

Community:

- Sunrise Lake, Pennsylvania, United States, a census-designated place
