= Sunrise (play) =

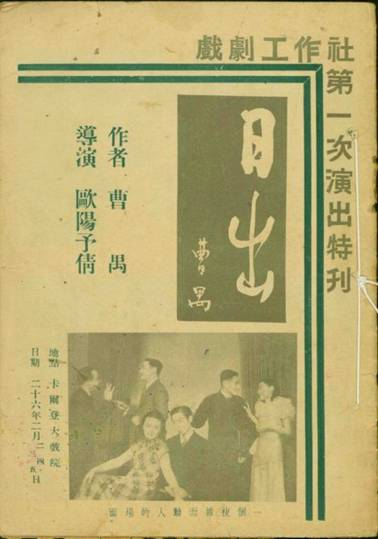
The cover of the program for the premiere showing of Sunrise in 1936.

Sunrise (Chinese: 日出; pinyin: Rìchū) is a 1936 Chinese-language play by Cao Yu. Cao Yu's daughter Wan Fang adapted the play into a libretto for the opera Sunrise by Jin Xiang in 2015.
