= Head to Head =

Head to Head may refer to:

== Television ==
- Head to Head, an Al Jazeera English program hosted by Mehdi Hasan
- "Head to Head", a 1999 episode of the medical drama All Saints
- "Head to Head", a 2015 episode of the animated superhero series Avengers Assemble
- "Head to Head", a 2002 episode of the war drama Das Boot
- "Head to Head" (The Gilded Age), a 2023 episode of the historical drama The Gilded Age
- "Head to Head", a 1978 episode of the police procedural drama Hawaii Five-O

== Music ==
- "Head to Head", a song by Fingathing from the 2000 album The Main Event
- "Head to Head", a 2010 song by Toni Halliday released under the Chatelaine moniker
- "Head to Head", a song by Gin Wigmore from the 2018 album Ivory

== Publications ==
- "Head to Head", a 2014 scene of the sports manga Dear Boys
- Head to Head: The Coming Economic Battle Among Japan, Europe and America, a 1993 book by Lester Thurow

== Other uses ==
- Head to Head, a series of Coleco handheld electronic games

== See also ==
- Head 2 Head, a 2006 Australian sports quiz show
- Head 2 Head (2025 TV series), a 2025 Thai boys' love television series
