= Cai Xiang (artist) =

Cai Xiang (1923-July 24, 2001, Chinese: 蔡骧), was a Chinese artist and director. He was engaged in drama, radio drama and TV drama writing and directing throughout his life, and wrote, adapted, and directed more than 40 works.

== Biography ==
In 1940, he graduated from the National Theater College (Chinese: 国立戏剧专科学校), majoring in play-writing, and studied under Cao Yu.

In 1985, he founded the bimonthly magazine Television Art. He was the editor-in-chief of Television Art and Television Art Forum.

He was the choreographer of Shanghai People's Broadcasting Station Radio Drama Troupe, Central People's Broadcasting Station Radio Drama Troupe, Central Radio and Television Drama Troupe, and the choreographer and director of the Artistic Committee of Beijing Television Art Center.

He died on July 24, 2001, at the age of 78 years.
