= Brand New Sin =

American hard rock band

- Origin: Syracuse, New York
- Genres: Hard rock, Southern rock, heavy metal
- Years active: 2002–2012, 2019 (one-off show)
- Labels: Century Media, Now or Never
- Members: Kris Weichmann; Chuck Kahl; Joe Altier; Brian("Slider")Azzoto; Mike Rafferty
- Past members: Kenny Dunham; Kevin Dean; Tommy Matkowski; Joe Sweet; Ed Carpenter
- Website: BrandNewSin.com

Brand New Sin is a hard rock/Southern rock band from Syracuse, New York, active from 2002 to 2012.

The band reunited for a reunion show on May 4, 2019, in their hometown of Syracuse, New York, with all original members, followed by a second on August 25, 2019, at the Great New York State Fair's Experience Stage, as part of the Chevrolet Music Festival.

The band is best known for contributing the theme song for professional wrestler Paul Wight during his tenure in the WWE under the ring name "Big Show". Altier returned to provide the vocals for Wight's theme song when he joined All Elite Wrestling.

== Discography ==
=== Studio albums ===
- Brand New Sin (2002) Now or Never, Century Media (re-release)
- Recipe For Disaster (2005) Century Media
- Tequila (2006) Century Media
- Distilled (2009) Independent
- United State (2011) Goomba Music
- Live At The Lost (August 2019) Independent

=== Singles and EPs ===
- Black And Blue (2005) Century Media

== Members ==
=== Current members ===
- Joe Altier: vocals, keyboard (on recordings) (2001-2008, 2018–present)
- Kris Wiechmann: guitar, vocals (2001–present)
- Chuck Kahl: bass (2001–present)
- Brian "Slider" Azzoto: guitar, vocals (2001-2004, 2018–present)
- Mike Rafferty: drums (2001-2002, 2018–present)

=== Former Members ===
- Joe Sweet: vocals (2008–2009) (ex-Nine Ball)
- Ed Carpenter: (2009-2010)
- Kenny Dunham: guitars (2001-2009, 2018-2023)
- Kevin Dean (2002-2012, 2023)
- Tommy Matkowski (2010-2012, 2023)

=== Session Members ===
- Peter Walker - additional guitar (Recipe For Disaster)
- Steve Melkanos - harmonica, backing vocals (Distilled)
- Ron Keck - additional percussion (Distilled)
- Ronnie Dark - additional guitar, keyboard (Distilled, United State)
- Lou Segreti - live keyboard (2023–present)
