= Jin Xiang =

Chinese composer and conductor

- Chinese: 金湘
Transcriptions
Standard Mandarin
- Hanyu Pinyin: Jīn Xiāng

Jin Xiang (20 April 1935 – 23 December 2015) was a Chinese composer and conductor. He studied composition at the China Central Conservatory from 1954. In 1959, he received his Bachelor of Arts in Composition. Since being labelled a rightist in 1957, he was sent to work in Art Troupe of Aksu Prefecture after graduation, and had to labor at the same time. In 1973, he became a conductor of Orchestra of Song and Dance Ensemble of Xinjiang Song, Dance and Drama Theatre. After the Cultural Revolution he returned to Beijing and was conductor and composer in residence of the Orchestra of Beijing Song and Dance Ensemble from 1979–1984. Jin Xiang came to the United States in 1988 and was a visiting scholar at the Juilliard School in 1998 and the University of Washington and the composer-in-residence at the Washington National Opera. From 1994 to 1995, he was the Art Director of the China Performing Administration Centre of the Ministry of Culture. In 1996, he founded and was the president of the East-West Music Exchange Association, a non-profit that promoted the exchange of eastern and western music.

He died on 23 December 2015, aged 80.

== Selected works ==
=== Operas ===
- A Warm Breeze Outside 1980.
- The Savage Land (《原野》yuanye) 1987 after Cao Yu's 1937 play The Wilderness
- The King of Chu (《楚霸王》) 1994.
- Native Fatal Woman 1996.
- Beautiful Warrior 2001. Written with Barbara Zinn Krieger.
- Taxiwayi — The Beloved Troubadour 2003.
- Yang Guifei 2004.
- Eight Women Jump Into the River 2005.
- Rewap Love Song 2010.
- Sunrise 1990, 2015.

=== Chamber, vocal, and solo compositions ===
- Four Seasons Songs of Zi-Ye 1981.
- An Album of Chinese Painting: Pine, Bamboo, Plum 1985.
- String Quartet No. 1 1990.
- Chamber Concerto for 14 Instruments 1991.
- The Shape and the Spirit 1991.
- The Cooling Moon 1995.
- Si 1995.
- Nanjing Lament 1997.
- A Desert Ship 1998.
- Instant 1998.
- Sacrificing to Heaven 1999.
- Chinese Calligraphy 1999.
- The cuckoo crying blood 2000.
- From Ancient Style Into New Metre 2000.
- Song of the New Century 2000.
- The Cold Water of Yi River 2001.
- The Reticent Orchid 2001.
- Blood Over The Mountain 2003.
- Midnight Dialogue 2005.

=== Film music ===
- The Stars are Sparkling Tonight 1979.
- Fascinating Band 1983.
- Hut in Moonlight 1984.

=== Choral compositions ===
- Song of Green 1999.
- Hello, Forest 1999.
- Songhua River (Arrangement) 2001.
- Yunnan 2001.

=== Orchestral compositions ===
- Daqing Red Banners Reflecting Tianshan Mountains 1974.
- Taxiwayi 1978.
- Snow Lotus 1982.
- Illusion 1983, 2006.
- Five Songs from Shi-Jing Book 1985.
- A Glimpse of Taklamagan Desert 1987.
- Cao Xiu-Qing 1989.
- The Dream of Red Mansions 1989.
- Nyu-Wa 1989.
- Asking the Sky 1993.
- Ming 1994.
- Se 1994.
- So 1995.
- Hero of the Huge Desert 1996.
- Flower Season 1996.
- New Beginning Sounds 1996.
- Symphonic Overture 1997 1996.
- Wu: A Symphonietta 1997.
- Spring 1998.
- Oh Macao, My Macao 1999.
- The Love of Dragon and Phoenix 2000.
- Li Sao 2005.
- Nanjing Lament 2005.
