= The Sun Rising =

The Sun Rising may refer to:

- The Sun Rising (poem), a poem by John Donne published in 1633
- "The Sun Rising" (song), a 1989 single by The Beloved

== See also ==
- The Song Rising, 2017 novel by Samantha Shannon
- Sunrise (disambiguation)
