= Beijing Symphony Orchestra =

Orchestra in Beijing, China

Beijing Symphony Orchestra in 2018

Beijing Symphony Orchestra (Simplified Chinese: 北京交响乐团), founded in 1977, is a symphony orchestra in based in Beijing, China.

One of its best-known performances was an unfolding of Chinese history and culture performed at Badaling in the Great Wall which was transmitted internationally via satellite.

== Conductors ==
- Jin Xiang 1979–1984.
