= Dark Divide =

Region of Washington, United States

Coordinates: 46°19′06″N 121°45′39″W

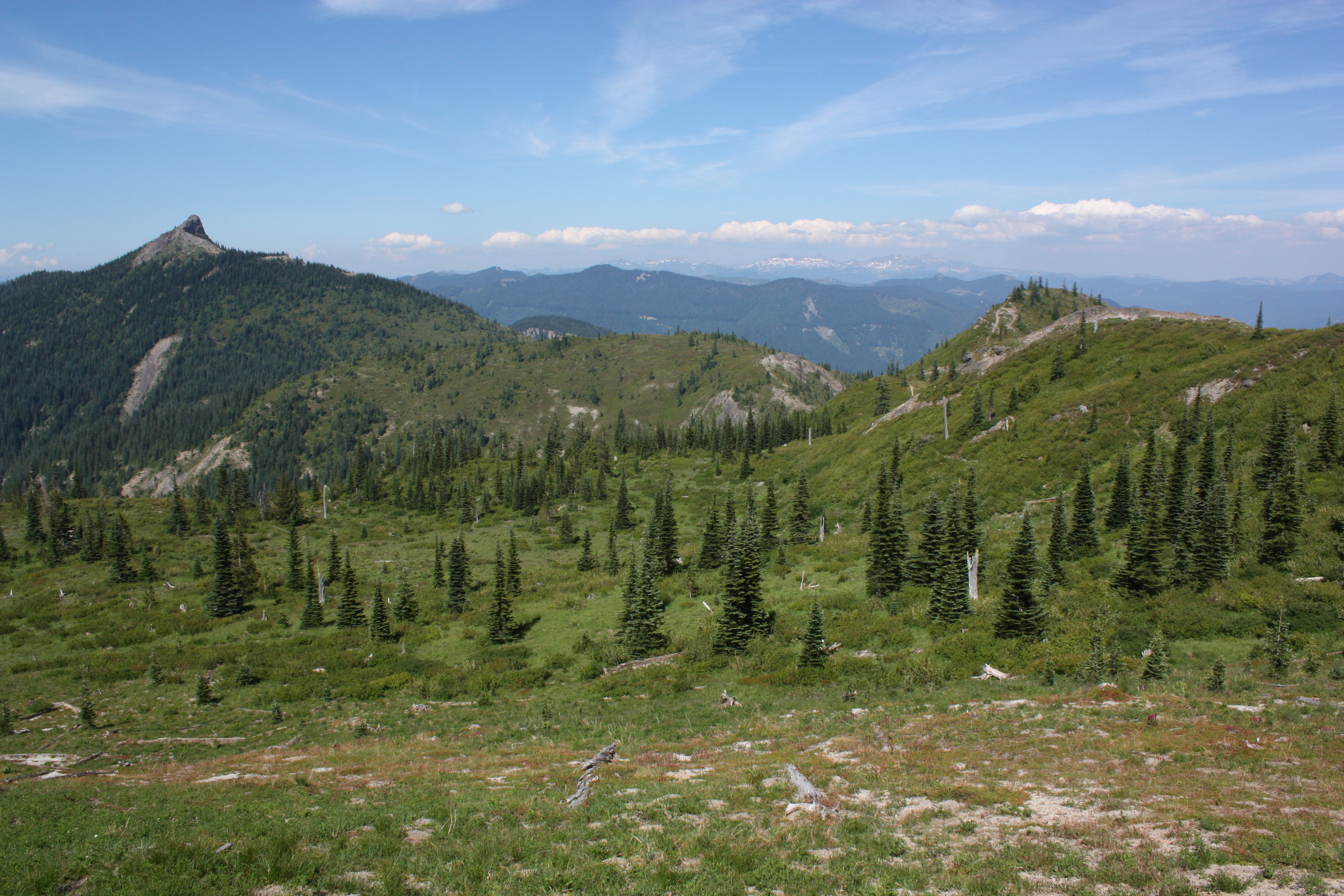
Sunrise Peak, 5,892 feet (1,796 m), left skyline, and Jumbo Shoulder (foreground) are major features of the Dark Divide.

The Dark Divide is the largest roadless area in western Washington state, comprising approximately 76,000 acres (310 km^{2}) of intact wilderness on Juniper Ridge linking Mount St. Helens and Mount Adams in the southern Cascade Mountains of Washington, within Gifford Pinchot National Forest. The Dark Divide is reported to contain the largest contiguous and unfragmented block of old-growth forest remaining in southwest Washington outside of Mount Rainier National Park. Within two remote valleys of the Lewis River drainage are 500-year-old trees. These ancient forests are protected from logging as reserves for the northern spotted owl and other species under the Northwest Forest Plan.

Downstream of the confluence of Quartz Creek, the Lewis River plunges over four large waterfalls. Curly Creek, another tributary, is the only cataract in Washington with an intact natural stone bridge, and the early formation of a second natural bridge can be observed. Although the Dark Divide is largely composed of black basalt, features such as 5,238-foot (1,596 m) Dark Mountain, Dark Creek and Dark Meadows are actually named for John Dark, a 19th-century gold prospector and speculator.

== Gallery ==
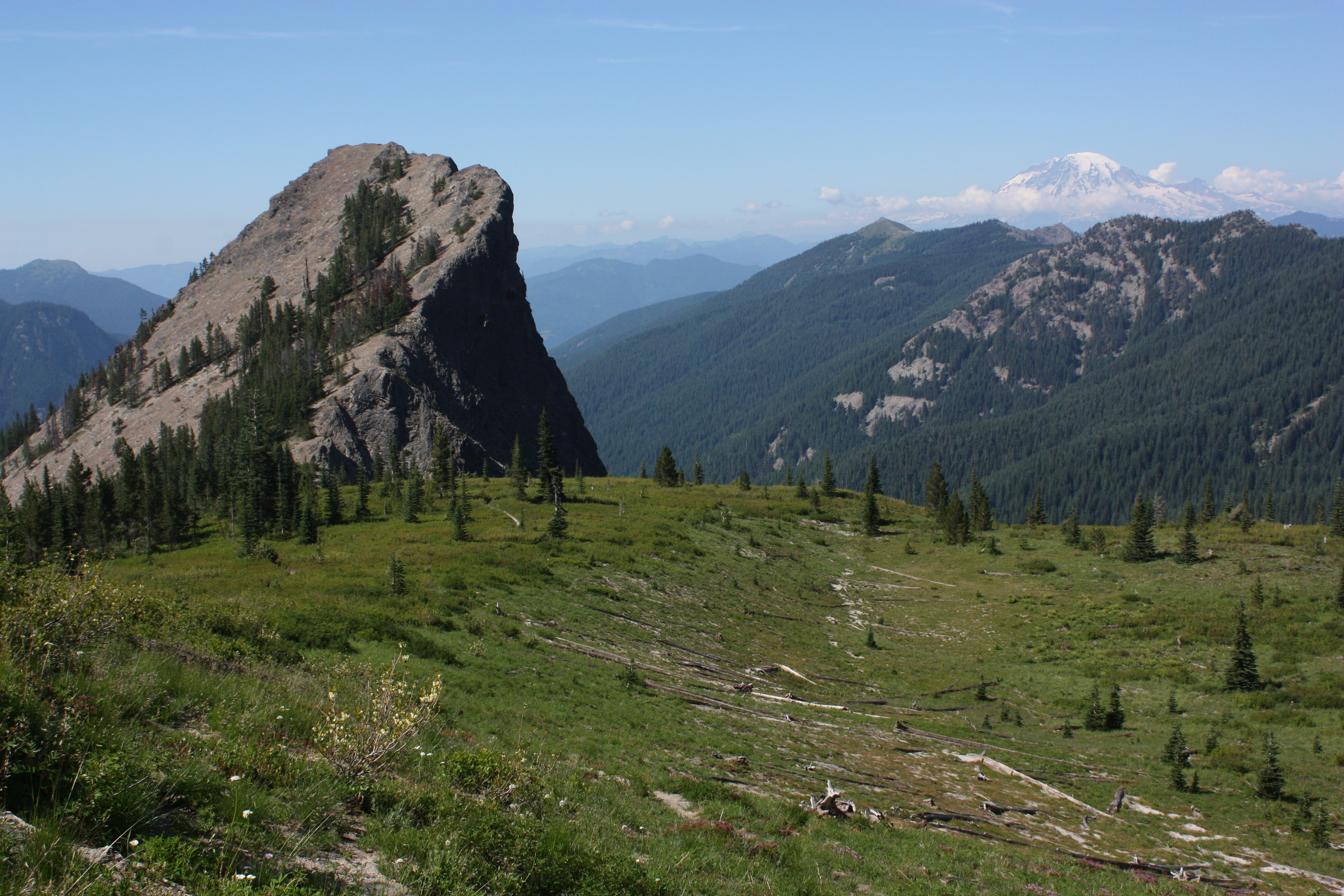
A rock outcropping immediately north of the summit of Jumbo Peak with Mount Rainier in the background

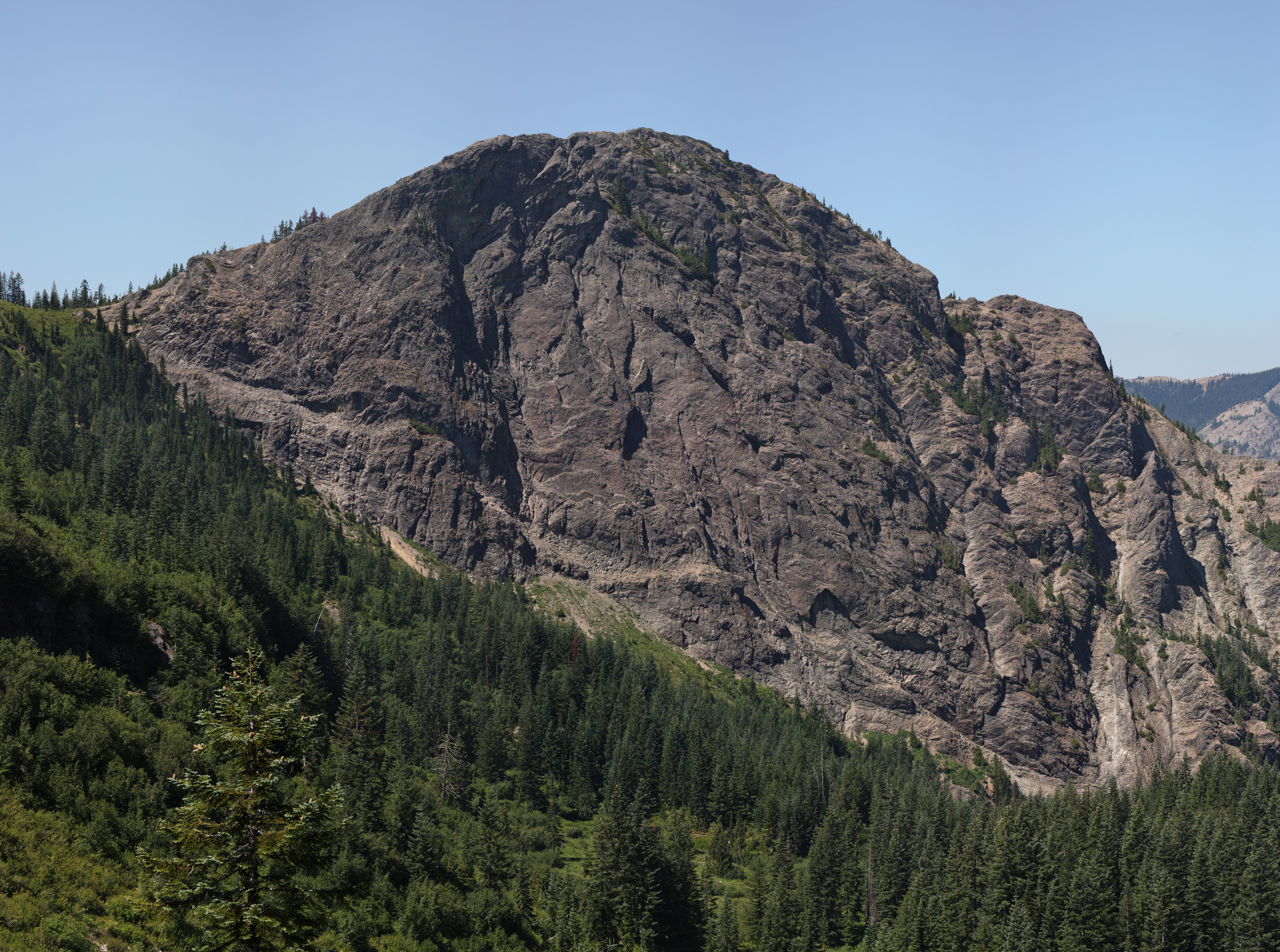
Rock outcropping on slopes of Jumbo Peak

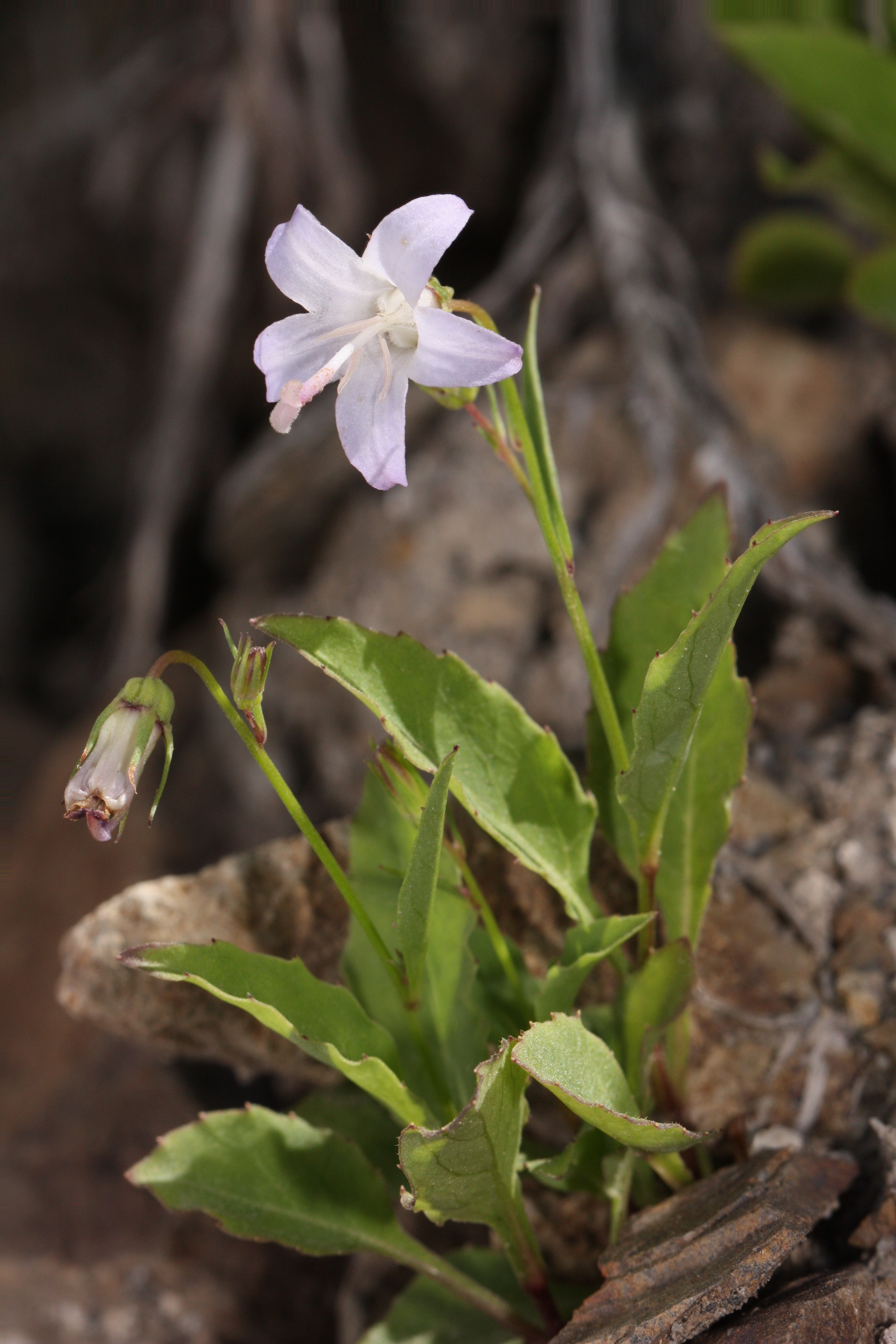
Pale bellflower (Campanula scouleri)

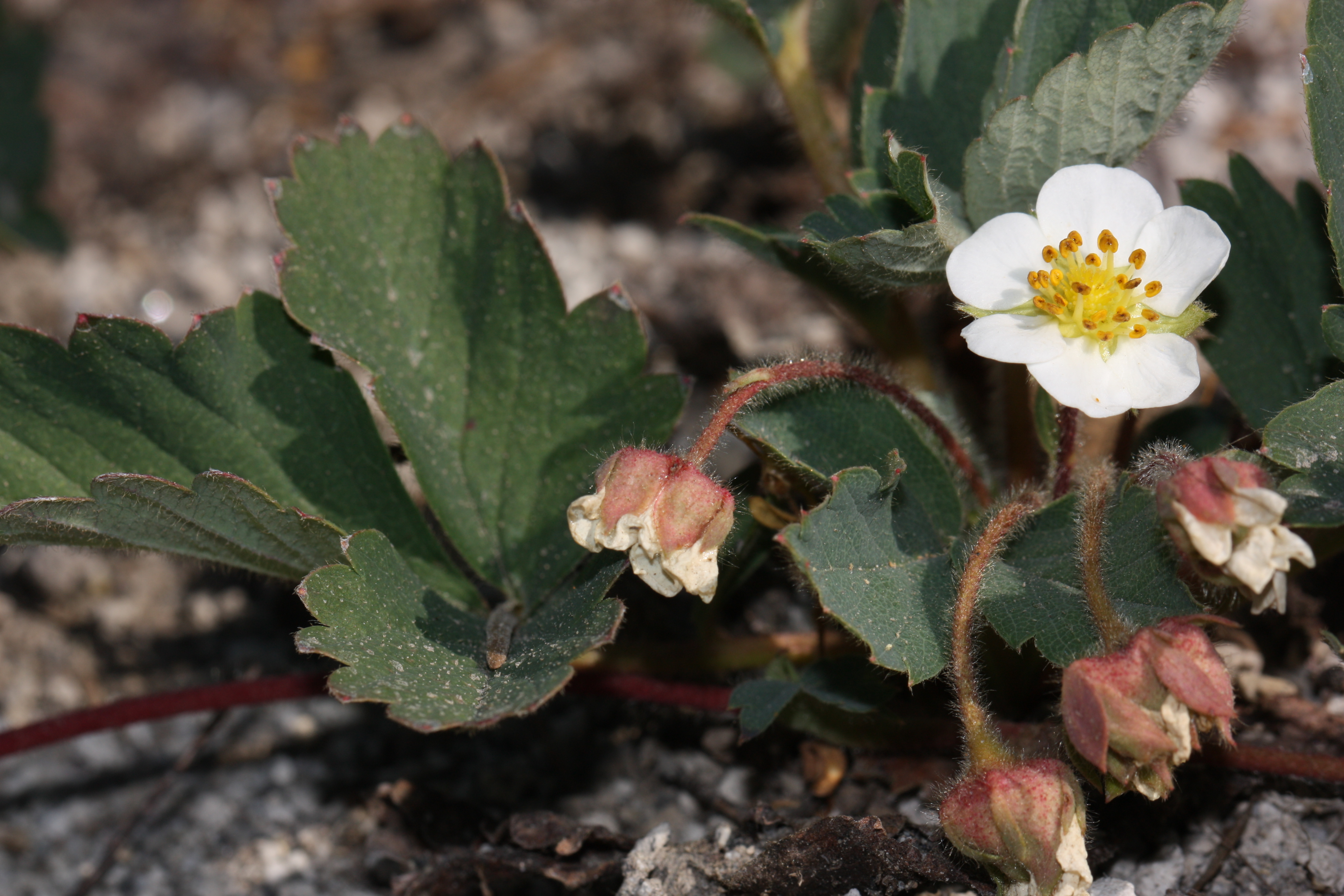
Virginia strawberry (Fragaria virginiana)

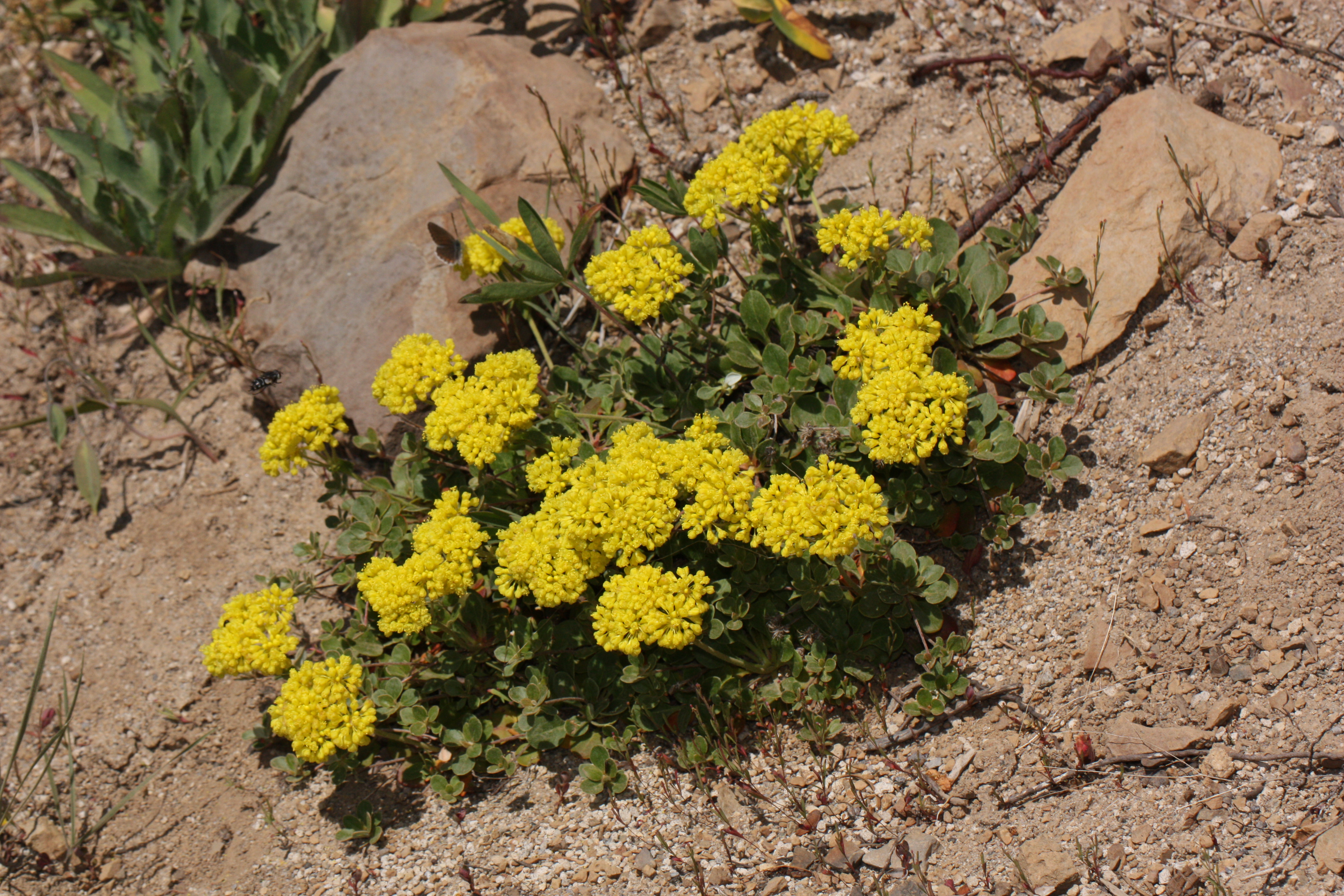
Sulphur flower (Eriogonum umbellatum)

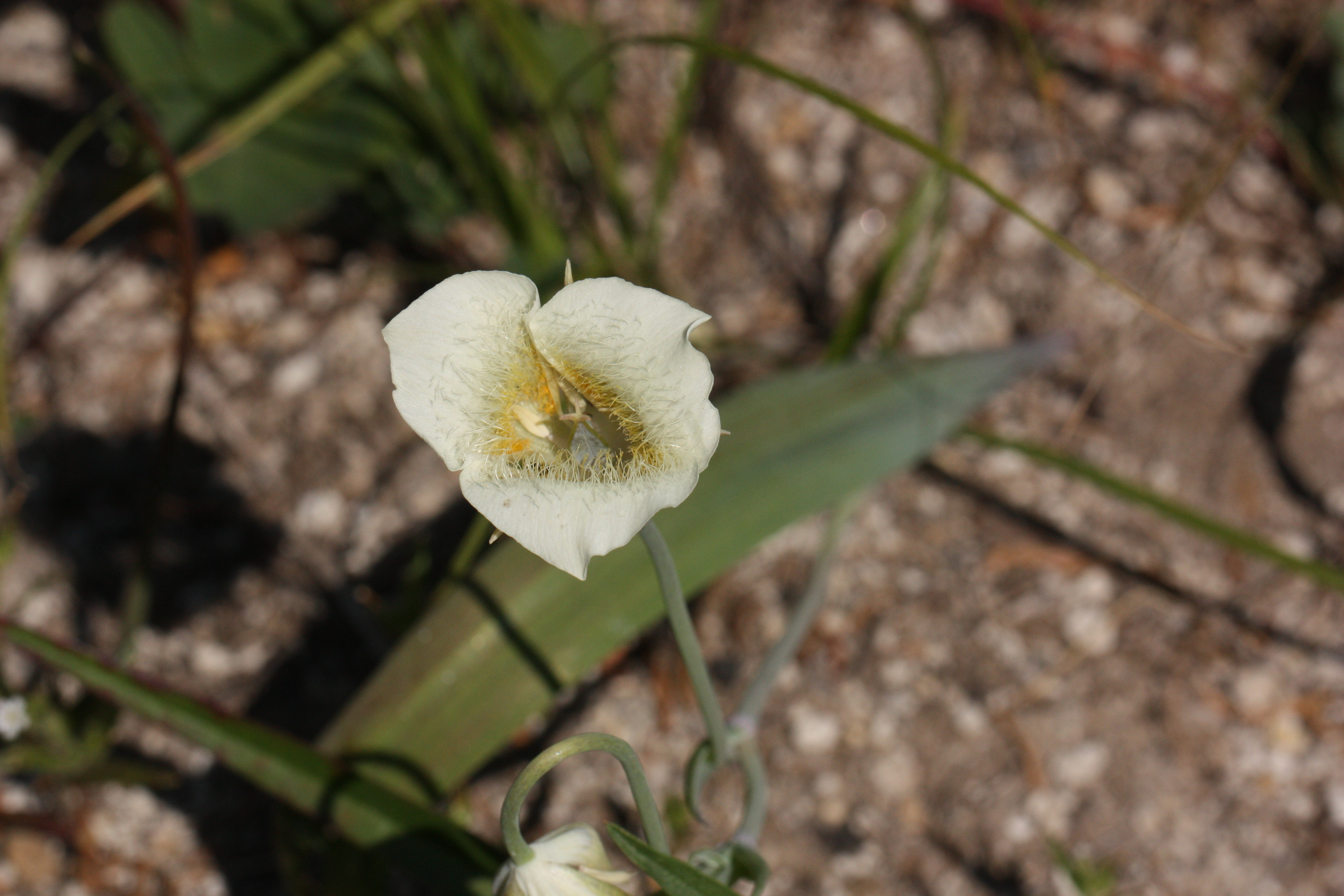
Subalpine mariposa lily (Calochortus subalpinus)

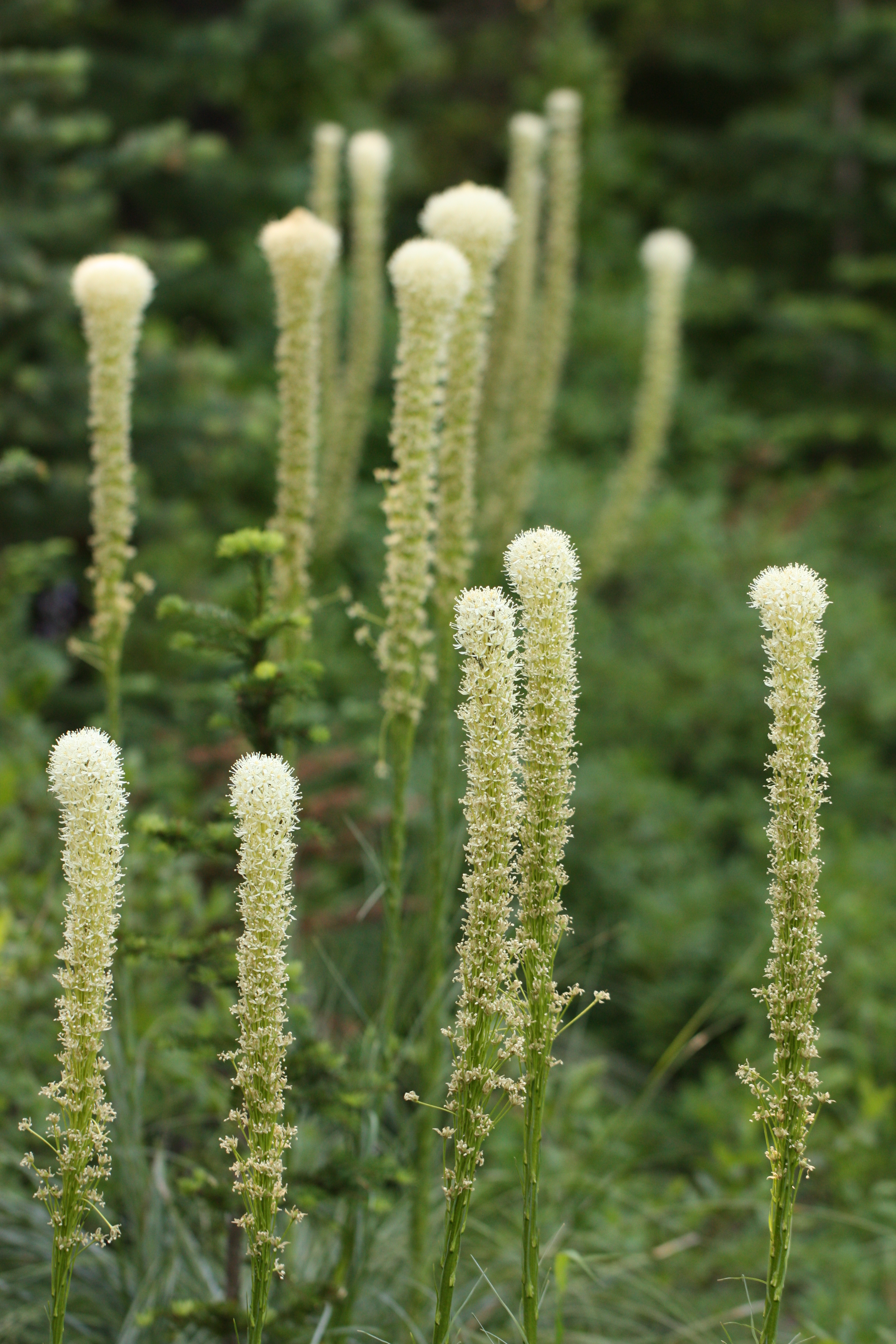
Bear grass (Xerophyllum tenax)

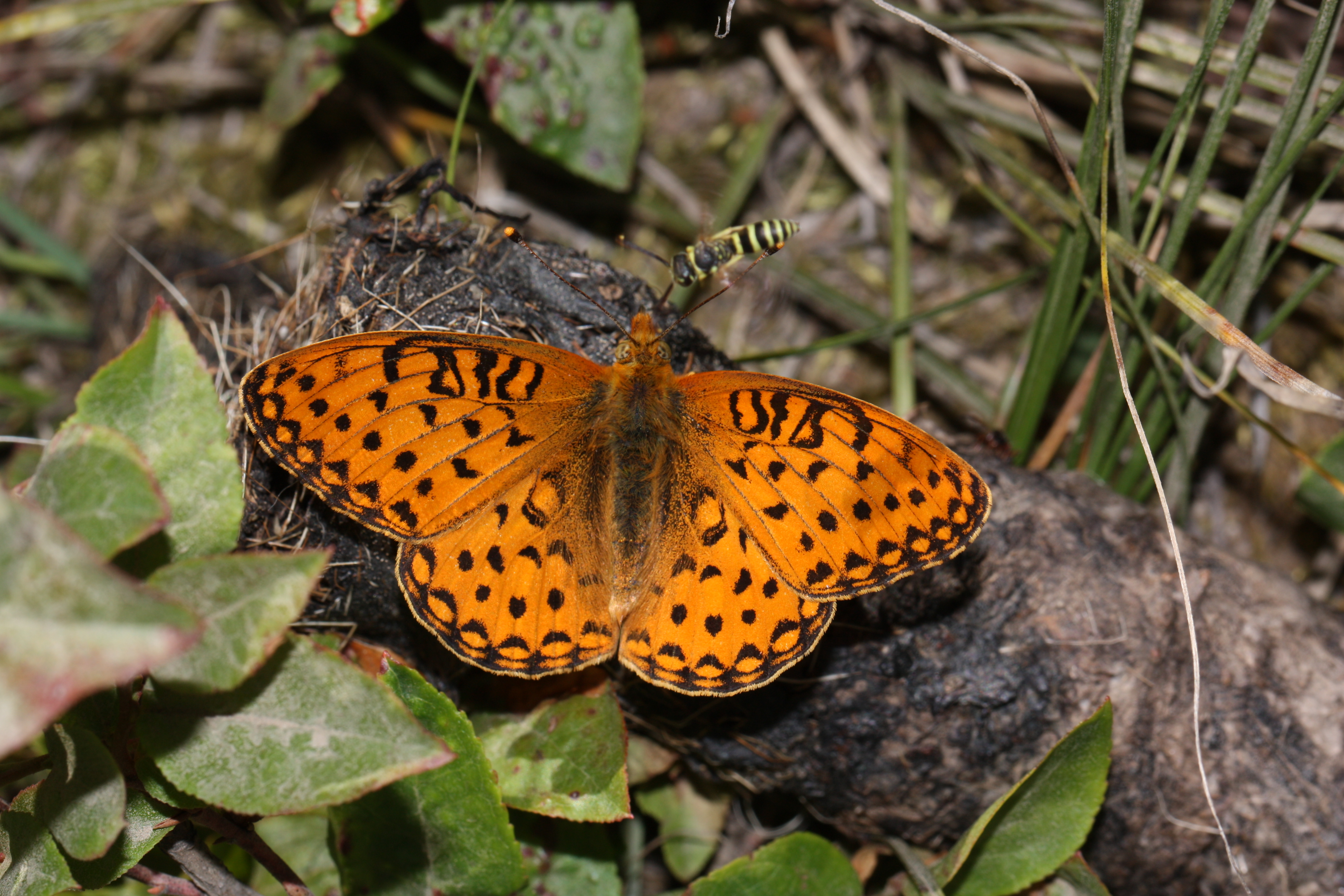
Mormon fritillary (Speyeria mormonia)

== Sources ==
- Pyle, Robert Michael, Where Bigfoot Walks: Crossing the Dark Divide, Houghton Mifflin, 1995, ISBN 0-395-44114-5
- Washington’s Dark Divide Roadless Area
