= Sunrise FM =

Sunrise FM could refer to:

- Sunrise FM (Ghana), a radio station in Koforidua, Ghana
- Sunrise Radio (Yorkshire), a radio station in Bradford, West Yorkshire, United Kingdom
- Sunrise Radio (Ireland), a radio station in Dublin, Ireland
- Sunrise FM (London), a former pirate radio station based in London, United Kingdom
- Sunrise FM Mati, a radio station in Mati City, Philippines
- Sunrise FM, Mauritius, a web radio station in Mauritius

== See also ==
- Sunrise Radio, an AM radio station in London, England which is also broadcast to most of the UK on DAB
