= Jumbo Peak (Washington) =

Mountain in Washington state

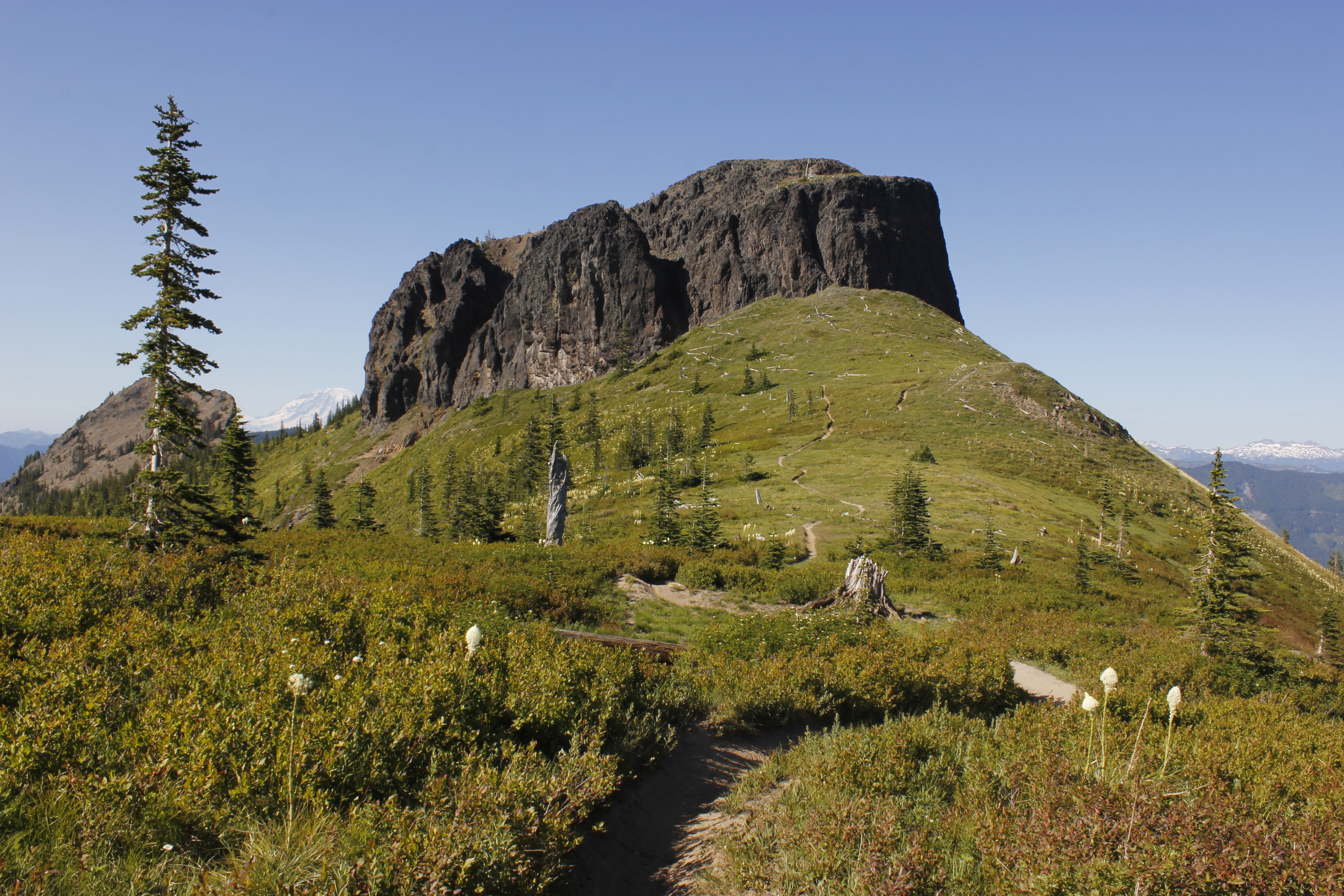
- Jumbo Peak summit, south aspect

Highest point
- Elevation: 5,801 ft (1,768 m)
- Prominence: 1,081 ft (329 m)
- Parent peak: Sunrise Peak (5,892 ft)
- Isolation: 1.69 mi (2.72 km)
- Coordinates: 46°18′33″N 121°46′06″W

Geography
- Location within Washington (state) Location within the United States
- Location: Skamania County; Washington, U.S.
- Parent range: Cascades
- Topo map: USGS McCoy Peak

Geology
- Rock type(s): andesite and dacite
- Volcanic arc: Cascade Volcanic Arc

Climbing
- Easiest route: Hiking north flank

Jumbo Peak is a 5,801 ft (1,770 m) volcanic mountain summit located in the Gifford Pinchot National Forest, in Skamania County of Washington state. It is situated in the Cascade Range, 15 mi (24 km) northwest of Mount Adams, 20 mi (32 km) east-northeast of Mount St. Helens, and 38 mi (61 km) south of Mount Rainier. Its nearest higher neighbor is Sunrise Peak, 1.7 mi (2.7 km) to the north-northeast. Precipitation runoff from Jumbo Peak drains into tributaries of the Cowlitz River drainage basin. The Juniper Ridge Trail (#261) which skirts this peak provides access to this remote peak.

== Geology ==
The history of the formation of the Cascade Mountains dates back millions of years ago to the late Eocene Epoch. With the North American Plate overriding the Pacific Plate, episodes of volcanic igneous activity occurred. Mount Adams, a stratovolcano that is 15 mi (24 km) southeast of Jumbo Peak, began forming in the Pleistocene. Due to Mount St. Helens' proximity to Jumbo Peak, volcanic ash is common in the area. Jumbo Peak is composed of Pliocene-Miocene andesitic magma that intruded up into older volcanic rocks more than five million years ago and is now surrounded by a forest of old-growth Douglas fir and mountain hemlock.

== Climate ==
Jumbo Peak is located in the marine west coast climate zone of western North America. Most weather fronts originate in the Pacific Ocean, and travel northeast toward the Cascade Mountains. As fronts approach, they are forced upward by the peaks of the Cascade Range (Orographic lift), causing them to drop their moisture in the form of rain or snowfall onto the Cascades. As a result, the west side of the Cascades experiences high precipitation, especially during the winter months in the form of snowfall. During winter months, weather is usually cloudy, but due to high pressure systems over the Pacific Ocean that intensify during summer months, there is often little or no cloud cover during the summer.

== See also ==
- Geology of the Pacific Northwest
- Dark Divide
- List of mountain peaks of Washington (state)
