= Benny Cassette discography =

The discography of Benny Cassette consists of several singles and remixes, a collaboration EP with Chuck Inglish, and numerous songwriting and production credits. He was signed to Kanye West's GOOD Music label in 2013 as a producer. He has written or produced songs and albums for artists like Kanye West, Burna Boy, Miguel, Jacob Banks, Tiana Major9, The Band Perry, and others.

== Albums ==
=== Collaborations ===
List of collaboration albums
Title	Album details
Angel Dust (EP) (with Chuck Inglish)	Released: October 30, 2012 (US); Label: Self-released; Formats: Digital download, CD

== Singles ==
=== As lead artist ===
List of singles with selected chart positions
Title	Year	Peak chart positions			Album
Title	Year	US	US Emerging	US Spotify	Album
"Raging Bull"	2014	—	—	—	Non-album singles
"Virgo Season" (ft. Isaiah Rashad)	2014	—	14	—	Non-album singles
"Bridges over Babylon" (ft. BJ the Chicago Kid)	2014	—	—	—	Non-album singles
"Sex and Faith"	2014	—	—	—	Non-album singles
"Bombs (Over Baghdad)" (ft. Pell)	2016	—	—	—	TBA
"Entertain Us"	2016	—	—	5	TBA
"Be Wild" (ft. Alice Leigh)	2016	—	—	—	TBA
"Sunrise Sunset"	2017	—	—	—	TBA
"Maxine"	2017	—	—	—	TBA
"Broken"	2021	—	—	—	Love God Get Money EP
"Sayonara"	2021	—	—	—	Love God Get Money EP
"Mulholland Drive"	2021	—	—	—	Love God Get Money EP
"It's My Birthday"	2021	—	—	—	Love God Get Money EP
"Love God Get Money"	2021	—	—	—	Love God Get Money EP
"Redemption"	2021	—	—	—	Love God Get Money EP
"I'm Tired"	2021	—	—	—	Love God Get Money EP
"—" denotes a single that did not chart or was not released in that territory.

=== Remixes ===
List of remixes, with original artist(s), showing year released and album name
Title	Year	Original artist(s)	Album
"You're Not the One"	2014	Sky Ferreira	Night Time, My Time
"I Blame Myself"	2014	Sky Ferreira	Night Time, My Time
"You & I (Nobody in the World)"	2015	John Legend	Love in the Future

== Songwriting and production ==
=== Albums ===
Album	Year	Artist(s)	Role	Notes
Yeezus	2013	Kanye West	Co-producer	US, AUS, UK #1
Heart on My Sleeve	2014	Mary Lambert	Co-producer, co-writer	US #29, AUS #61
Convertibles	2014	Chuck Inglish	Engineer, featured artist, vocals	US RB/HH #24
R.P.Y.	2014	Moxie	Co-producer	
The Life of Pablo	2016	Kanye West	Co-producer	US #1
A Motown Holiday	2020	Tiana Major9, Asiahn, Njomza	Co-producer, co-writer	

=== Songs ===
Single name	Year	Primary artist(s)	Album	Role	Notes
"Black Skinhead"	2013	Kanye West	Yeezus	Co-producer	US #69
"New Slaves"	2013	Kanye West	Yeezus	Co-producer	US #56
"Hold My Liquor"	2013	Kanye West	Yeezus	Co-producer	US RB/HH #32
"Send It Up"	2013	Kanye West	Yeezus	Co-producer	US RB/HH #50
"Secrets"	2014	Mary Lambert	Heart on My Sleeve	Co-producer, co-writer	US #66
"So Far Away"	2014	Mary Lambert	Heart on My Sleeve	Co-producer	
"Ribcage"	2014	Mary Lambert	Heart on My Sleeve	Co-producer	
"Monochromatic"	2014	Mary Lambert	Heart on My Sleeve	Co-producer	
"Heart on My Sleeve"	2014	Mary Lambert	Heart on My Sleeve	Co-producer	
"Sum of Our Parts"	2014	Mary Lambert	Heart on My Sleeve	Co-producer	
"Sing to Me"	2014	Mary Lambert	Heart on My Sleeve	Co-producer	
"When You Sleep"	2014	Mary Lambert	Heart on My Sleeve	Co-producer	
"No Good In Goodnight"	2014	Ferras	Ferras (EP)	Producer	
"Honey Dip"	2014	Dev	Bittersweet July	Producer	
"NWA" (feat. Kurupt)	2015	Miguel	WILDHEART	Co-producer, co-writer	
"Live For Today" (feat. Common)	2015	Stacy Barthe	Becoming	Songwriter	
"You Wonder Why?"	2015	Stacy Barthe	Becoming	Producer	US Adult RB #23
"Barbwire"	2015	Allen Stone	Radius	Producer	
"Freedom"	2015	Allen Stone	Radius	Producer	
"Monster"	2015	Jacob Banks	The Paradox EP	Producer	
"Bleeding Out"	2015	Wynter Gordon	Five Needle EP	Co-producer	
"Home"	2015	Wynter Gordon	Five Needle EP	Co-producer	
"World On Fire"	2015	Wynter Gordon	Five Needle EP	Co-producer	
"Comeback Kid"	2016	The Band Perry	Non-album single	Co-producer	US Country #42
"Best View"	2016	Black Party	Mango	Co-producer	
"You"	2016	Black Party	Mango	Co-producer	
"Stay in the Dark"	2017	The Band Perry	My Bad Imagination	Co-producer, co-writer	Adult Top 40 #23
"Close Your Eyes"	2017	The All-American Rejects	Sweat EP	Producer, co-writer	
"Love Ain't Enough"	2018	Jacob Banks	Village	Co-producer	
"I Love Myself"	2019	Ciara	Beauty Marks (album)	Co-producer, co-writer	
"Na Na"	2019	Ciara	Beauty Marks (album)	Co-producer, co-writer	
"Collide"	2019	Tiana Major9, EarthGang	Queen & Slim (soundtrack)	Co-producer, co-writer	
"My Money, My Baby"	2019	Burna Boy	Queen & Slim (soundtrack)	Co-producer, co-writer	
"Think About You"	2020	Tiana Major9	At Sixes And Sevens EP	Co-producer, co-writer	
"fade away"	2020	kai	like water EP	Co-producer, co-writer	
