= Recipe for Disaster (album) =

Studio album by Brand New Sin
- Released: May 31, 2005
- Recorded: Village Recorders
- Genre: Southern rock, heavy metal
- Length: 47:08
- Label: Century Media
- Producer: Brand New Sin, Pete Walker

Brand New Sin chronology
| Brand New Sin (2002) | Recipe for Disaster (2005) | Tequila (2006) |

Professional ratings
Review scores
| Source | Rating |
|---|---|
| AllMusic | 3.5/5 stars |
| Blabbermouth.net | 6.5/10 |

Recipe for Disaster is the second full-length album by the American hard rock band Brand New Sin. It was released in 2005 via Century Media Records.

Singles included "Black and Blue," for which a music video was made, and "Days Are Numbered."

== Critical reception ==
AllMusic called the album "a fine one, with more than enough high-water marks to counter the lows, and more than enough sheer 'rawk' gumption to stand out from the cookie-cutter radio rockers out there." PopMatters called the album "a confident step forward," writing that it is "the perfect music for a summer afternoon with a tubful of beer on ice." Exclaim! derided the "vocals that sound like a furious and bowel-obstructed Scott Stapp, tired mid-tempo Southern rock blues-riffing punctuated by occasional hints of thrash, and enough debased artificial harmonic guitar solo wankery to make Dimebag Darrell roll over in his grave."

== Track listing ==
1. "Arrived" – 3:10
2. "The Loner" – 2:33
3. "Brown Street Betty" – 3:20
4. "Black and Blue" – 3:16
5. "Running Alone" – 4:04
6. "Freight Train" – 3:33
7. "Vicious Cycles" – 3:45
8. "Another Reason" – 5:19
9. "Days Are Numbered" – 3:19
10. "Once in a Lifetime" – 4:23
11. "Dead Man Walking" – 3:38
12. "Gulch" – 0:39
13. "Wyoming" – 6:09

== Personnel ==
- Joe Altier – vocals
- Kris Wiechmann – guitar
- Kenny Dunham – guitar
- Chuck Kahl – bass
- Kevin Dean – drums
- Engineered and mixed by Pete Walker
- Mastered by Alan Douches at West Side Music
