= Honey Dip =

Single by Dev

from the album Bittersweet July
- Released: November 5, 2014
- Genre: Synthpop
- Length: 3:52
- Label: Rica Lyfe
- Songwriters: Devin Tailes; David Singer-Vine
- Producers: Benny Cassette; Rayintosh

Dev singles chronology
"Kiss It" (2013)	"Honey Dip" (2014)	"Parade" (2015)

"Honey Dip" is a song performed by American singer Dev, co-written by David Singer-Vine aka "Campa" of hip hop duo The Cataracs and produced by Benny Cassette with the assistance of Rayintosh. It was written by Dev as a single extracted from her EP Bittersweet July. The song was released as the first official single on November 5, 2014. "Honey Dip" is a synthpop song with rap verses before the chorus. The official video was directed by American rapper Kreayshawn.

Dev performed the single live on Big Morning Buzz Live on March 3, 2015. Her performance gained positive appreciations for its unexpected simplicity and naturalness.

== Background ==
"Honey Dip" is the first track of Dev's EP Bittersweet July since it incorporates in its meaning and in its culinary metaphors the entire EP concept. In an interview with PopCrush, Dev said that for her, "Honey Dip" is an honest love record where she's like ‘This is me and I kind of drink and hang out but I’ll love you forever.’ Dev also spoke about how was pleasant working with Kreayshawn, since both her and Dev were friends before they become famous and they also had a baby in the same period. "It was definitely fun and I think Kreay shoots and directs in a cool way where I very much felt like she had her ideas and visions but also let me do my thing" said Dev speaking about her video collaboration.

== Composition ==
"Honey Dip" is a song featuring a hypnotic synth instrumental that is enriched by a nuanced choir in the chorus. The verses are sung with swag rapped verses which are defined by the critic as the distinctive mark of Dev, called from them a "talked singing". The bridge and the fourth chorus (which has a slight lyrical and musical variation) are not featured in the video version and in the radio edit. Lyrically, the song speaks about a hard but still sweet relationship, kept strong despite the confusion given from the fake world.

== Critical reception ==
"Honey Dip" has received mostly positive reviews from the critics, who called it a more personal but less powerful version of Dev past hits and praised especially the lyrics. Kel & Mel wrote in their review of the song that "the production has a light but trippy sound to it that highlights Dev lighter-than-usual vocals, and the Kreayshawn direction shows how an incapable singer can be good also in other things".

== Music video ==
The official music video was directed by Kreayshawn and premiered on Billboard. The video was released on YouTube on November 25, 2014, and the after day also in HD version. It shows Dev in her own house reading magazines in her bed and making selfies in front of her mirror. At a later time she's seen cooking meat to barbecue in her own garden, the "perfect match to her bittersweet honey". The video was re-uploaded on Dev's official VEVO channel on January 27, 2015.
