= Sunrise Senior Living =

North American elderly care homes operator

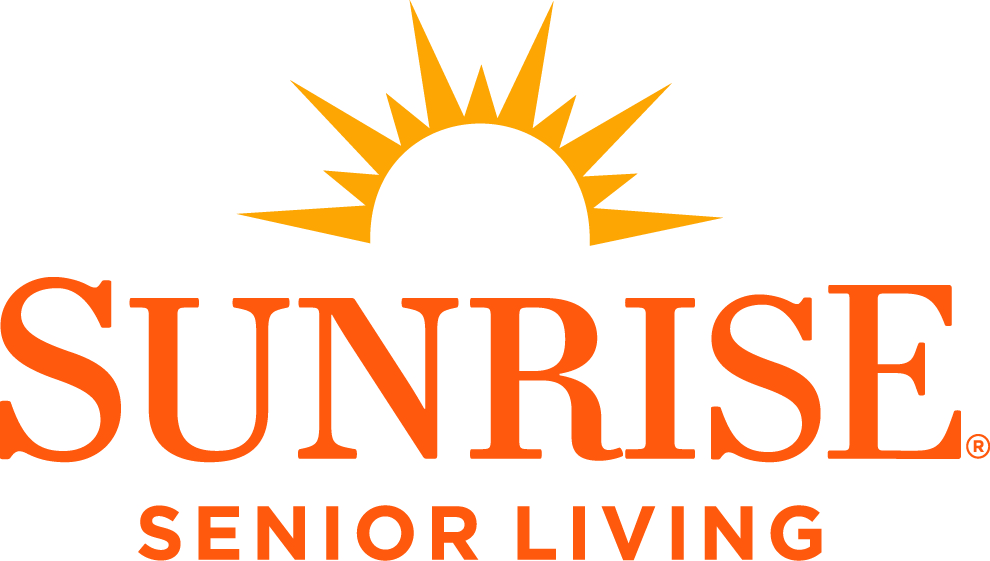
- Industry: Senior Living
- Founded: 1981; 45 years ago Oakton, Virginia, U.S.
- Founders: Paul Klaassen; Terry Klaassen
- Headquarters: McLean, Virginia, U.S.
- Number of locations: 240+
- Key people: Jack R. Callison, Jr. (CEO)
- Services: Independent living, assisted living, memory care, respite care, short-term stays
- Website: sunriseseniorliving.com

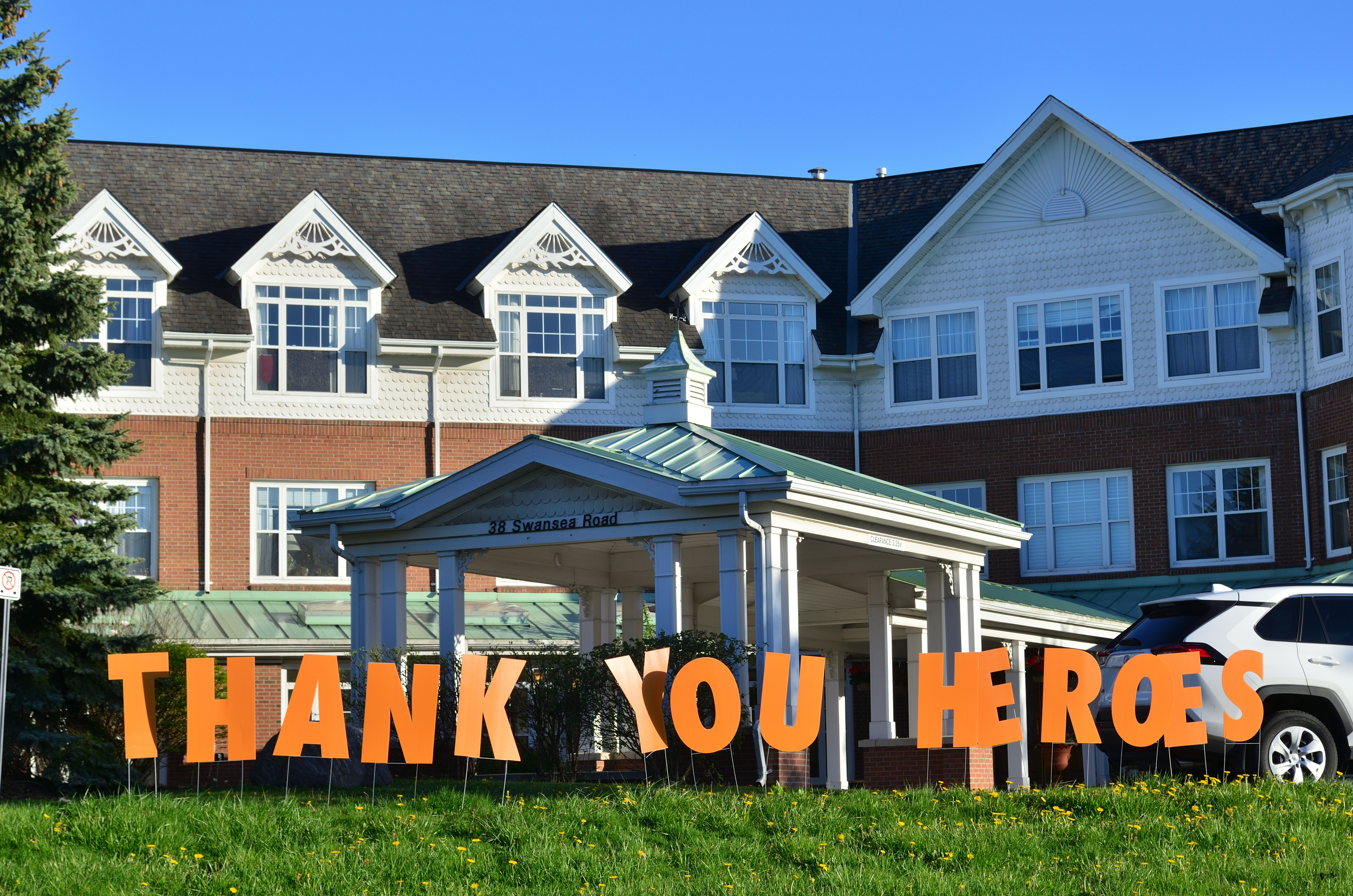
Sunrise Senior Living during COVID-19

Sunrise Senior Living is an American operator of senior living communities. As of 2026, it operates more than 240 independent living, assisted living, memory care communities throughout the United States and Canada making it the seventh-largest senior living provider in the U.S. Sunrise has communities in 28 states, including states such as California, Colorado, Georgia, Illinois, Maryland, Michigan, New Jersey, New York, North Carolina, Pennsylvania, and Virginia.

== Overview ==
Headquartered in McLean, Virginia, in the Washington, DC metropolitan area. Sunrise offers senior living services, including independent living, assisted living, care for individuals with Alzheimer's disease and other forms of memory loss, as well as respite care and short-term stays.

== History ==
The first Sunrise community was opened in 1981 in Oakton, Virginia, by founders Paul and Terry Klaassen. In April 2021, Jack R. Callison, Jr. was named Sunrise’s chief executive officer (CEO).

Sunrise Senior Living and its communities have received recognition from national organizations and publications within the senior living industry. Beginning in 2022, Sunrise communities have been recognized in U.S. News & World Report’s Best Senior Living ratings.

Sunrise has also been recognized as a workplace within the aging services sector. The company has been named to Fortune’s Best Workplaces in Aging Services, which evaluates organizations based on employee feedback and workplace culture.

In December 2021, Sunrise Senior Living opened Sunrise at East 56th, a 151-unit community in New York City. The building earned LEED Silver for sustainability and leadership, WELL Certification (silver) for quality building air, water, light, nourishment, fitness, comfort, and mind and WELL Health-Safety Rating Seal for cleaning practices and air and water quality. Sunrise at East 56th is the only building in the senior living industry to have all three certifications.

Opened in 2023, The Apsley on Manhattan’s Upper West Side has achieved WELL Certification Platinum, the highest level of recognition, as well as the LEED Gold certification.

== United Kingdom ==
In 2021, the company announced that following a comprehensive strategic review, the company would exit as manager of its UK portfolio.
