= Operation Sunrise =

Operation Sunrise may refer to:

- Operation Sunrise (World War II), a series of secret negotiations in March 1945 in Switzerland between elements of the Nazi German SS and the U.S. Office of Strategic Services under Allen Dulles
- Operation Sunrise (Nyasaland), mass detentions which marked the first stage in a State of Emergency declared on March 3, 1959
- Operation Sunrise (Vietnam War), a 1962 test of the Strategic Hamlet Program
- Operation Sunrise (Albania), part of the 1997 rebellion in Albania
- Operation Sunrise, a 2006 approach to the hyperinflation of banknotes of Zimbabwe
- Siege of Lal Masjid, code-named Operation Sunrise, a confrontation in July 2007 between an Islamic fundamentalist militia and the Government of Pakistan
- Operation Sunrise (2019), a joint army operation by India and Myanmar targeting insurgency in North East India
