= Sunrise Beach =

Sunrise Beach may refer to:

== Places ==
United States

- Sunrise Beach, Missouri
- Sunrise Beach Village, Texas

Elsewhere

- Sunrise Beach, Queensland, Australia
- Sunrise Beach, Alberta, a summer village in Alberta, Canada
