= Project Sunrise =

Project Sunrise may refer to:

- AstroFlight Sunrise, an early solar-powered aircraft project that first flew in California
- Project Sunrise (Qantas), a project by Australian airline Qantas to fly non-stop from Sydney, Australia, to New York City and to London in 2027
- Project Sunrise (Blue Origin), a project by Blue Origin for a orbital AI data center satellite constellation
- The Sunrise Project, an Australian environmental justice organization
- "Project Sunrise", a video game modification for Destiny 2
