= Sunrise Peak =

Mountain in Washington (state), United States

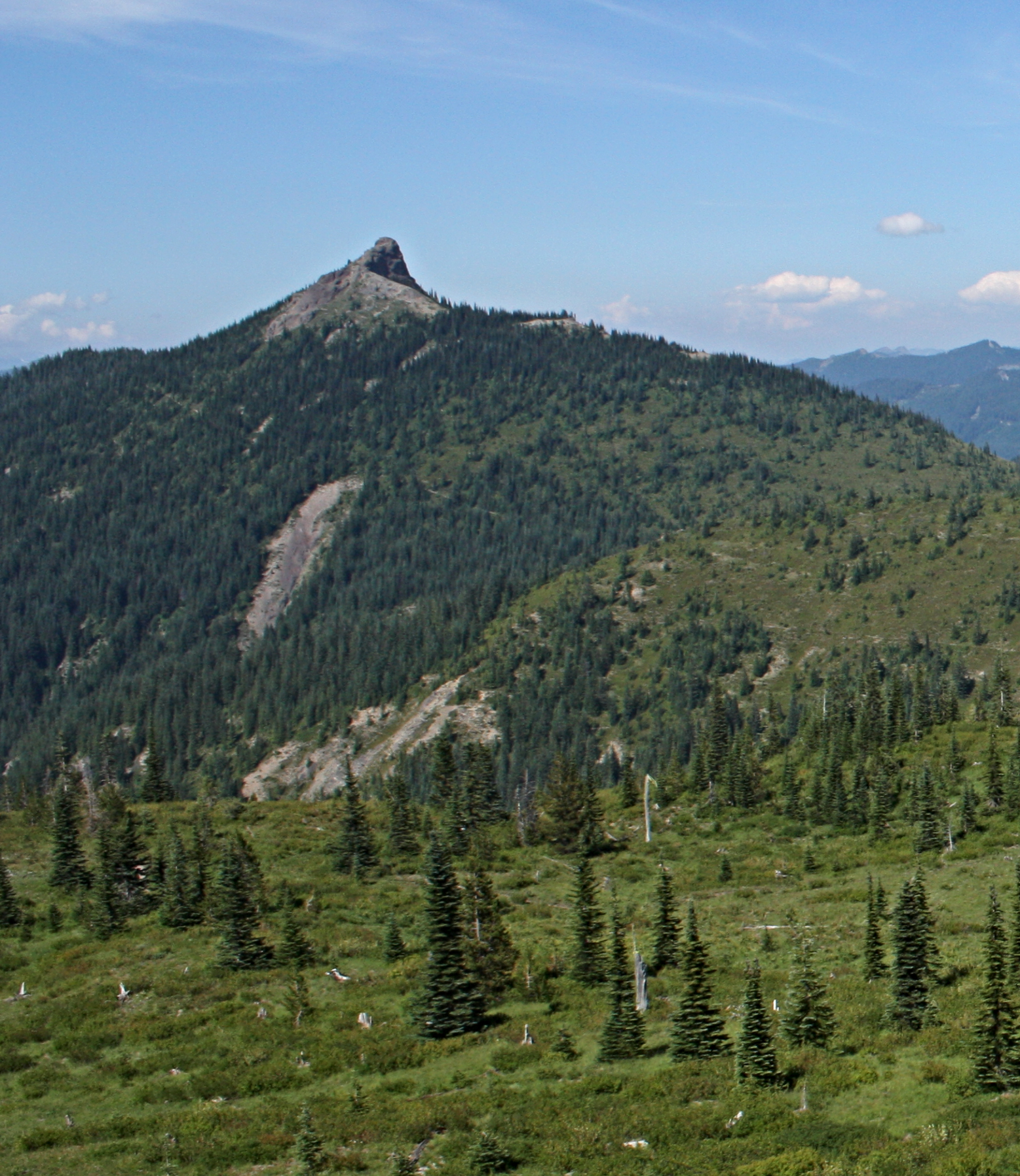
- Sunrise Peak from the southwest

Highest point
- Elevation: 5,892 ft (1,796 m)
- Prominence: 1,852 ft (564 m)
- Parent peak: Mount Adams (12,276 ft)
- Isolation: 13.25 mi (21.32 km)
- Coordinates: 46°19′57″N 121°45′33″W

Geography
- Location within Washington (state) Location within the United States
- Location: Skamania County; Washington, U.S.
- Parent range: Cascades
- Topo map: USGS McCoy Peak

Geology
- Rock type(s): andesite and dacite
- Volcanic arc: Cascade Volcanic Arc

Climbing
- Easiest route: Hiking trail

Sunrise Peak is a prominent 5,892 ft (1,800 m) volcanic mountain summit located in the Gifford Pinchot National Forest, in Skamania County of Washington state. It is situated in the Cascade Range, 15.7 mi (25.3 km) northwest of Mount Adams, 21 mi (34 km) northeast of Mount St. Helens, and 36 mi (58 km) south of Mount Rainier. Its nearest higher neighbor is Burnt Rock, 12.2 mi (19.6 km) to the southeast, and Jumbo Peak lies 1.7 mi (2.7 km) to the south-southwest. Precipitation runoff from Sunrise Peak drains into tributaries of the Cowlitz River drainage basin. The Sunrise Trail (#262) and Juniper Ridge Trail (#261, #261A) provide access to this remote peak, with minor scrambling at the summit.

== Geology ==
The history of the formation of the Cascade Mountains dates back millions of years ago to the late Eocene Epoch. With the North American Plate overriding the Pacific Plate, episodes of volcanic igneous activity occurred. Mount Adams, a stratovolcano that is 15.7 mi (25.3 km) southeast of Sunrise Peak, began forming in the Pleistocene. Due to Mount Saint Helens' proximity to Sunrise Peak, volcanic ash is common in the area. Sunrise Peak is composed of Pliocene-Miocene andesitic magma that intruded up into older volcanic rocks more than five million years ago and is now surrounded by a forest of old-growth Douglas fir and mountain hemlock.

== Climate ==
Sunrise Peak is located in the marine west coast climate zone of western North America. Most weather fronts originate in the Pacific Ocean, and travel northeast toward the Cascade Mountains. As fronts approach, they are forced upward by the peaks of the Cascade Range (Orographic lift), causing them to drop their moisture in the form of rain or snowfall onto the Cascades. As a result, the west side of the Cascades experiences high precipitation, especially during the winter months in the form of snowfall. During winter months, weather is usually cloudy, but due to high pressure systems over the Pacific Ocean that intensify during summer months, there is often little or no cloud cover during the summer.

== See also ==
- Geology of the Pacific Northwest
- Dark Divide
- List of mountain peaks of Washington (state)
