= Sunrise Community, Inc. =

Geography
- Location: 9040 Sunset Drive, Miami, Florida 33173, eastern United States, United States
- Coordinates: 25.70161°N 80.3408°W

Organization
- Type: subacute care

History
- Opened: 1962

Links
- Website: http://www.sunrisegroup.org/

Sunrise Community, Inc., is one of the private 501(c)(3) not-for-profit organizations in the country for people with intellectual and developmental disabilities. Much of the organization's early growth can be attributed to assisting state agencies with deinstitutionalization efforts, and in more recent years, Sunrise has welcomed smaller companies in need of assistance or support into the Sunrise Group. As a result, over the last 50 years Sunrise has increased the number of persons served from 50 people in just South Florida to over 2,000 across several states with over 3,000 employees.

== Services offered ==
Services offered include:

- Residential group homes for adults unable to function independently.
- In-home support for individuals living in their own homes who need some assistance with living.
- Respite care that allows care givers the chance to temporary leave an individual under their care in a group home so they can take a break from constant care.
- Employment training for those who can obtain jobs in the community.

== Review of organization ==
The Florida Agency for Healthcare Administration (AHCA) oversees safety inspections of all Sunrise facilities.
