= The Savage Land (film) =

The Savage Land (Yuan Ye) is a 1981 Chinese film directed by Ling Zi to a screenplay Si Ji after the play of the same name by Cao Yu. The film features Liu Xiaoqing as the female lead, Yang Zaibao, and Bu Min. The film was shown in Venice, but not released in China till 1987.
