= Sunrise, West Virginia =

Sunrise
- Unincorporated community
- Location within the state of West Virginia Sunrise (the United States)
- Coordinates: 39°16′14″N 81°30′13″W
- Country: United States
- State: West Virginia
- County: Wood
- Elevation: 725 ft (221 m)
- Time zone: UTC-5 (Eastern (EST))
  - Summer (DST): UTC-4 (EDT)
- GNIS ID: 1555755

Sunrise is an unincorporated community in Wood County, West Virginia, United States.
