= Tequila (Brand New Sin album) =

Studio album by Brand New Sin
- Released: October 3, 2006
- Recorded: Method of Groove Studio, Brooklyn, New York.
- Genres: Hard rock Heavy metal Southern rock
- Label: Century Media Records
- Producers: Joey Z and Brand New Sin

Brand New Sin chronology
Recipe For Disaster (2005)	Tequila (2006)	Distilled (2009)

Tequila is the third full-length album by American hard rock band Brand New Sin. This is the second album released on their current label, Century Media Records.

A music video was filmed for "Motormeth". Portions of the video were shot at the Dinosaur Bar-b-que restaurant in Syracuse, New York. Peter Steele from Type O Negative provided guest vocals on the song "Reaper Man".

== Critical reception ==
Professional ratings
Review scores
Source	Rating
AllMusic	4/5 stars
Scream Magazine	3/6 stars

AllMusic rated Tequila 4 out of 5 start, praising the band's "attractive sound" and "consistently excellent material". Ultimate Guitar rated it 8.3/10, singling out their cover of "House of the Rising Sun" for particular praise.

== Track listing ==
1. "Said and Done"
2. "Did Me Wrong"
3. "Spare the Agony"
4. "Ice Man"
5. "The Proposition"
6. "Old"
7. "Worm Whore"
8. "See the Sun"
9. "Motormeth"
10. "Numero Dos"
11. "Elogio"
12. "Reaper Man"
13. "Acehole"
14. "House of the Rising Sun"

== Personnel ==
- Joe Altier – vocals
- Kris Wiechmann – guitar
- Kenny Dunham – guitar
- Chuck Kahl – bass
- Kevin Dean – drums
- Joey Z – producer, Engineered and mixed
- Mastered by George Marino at Sterling Sound.
- Recorded at Method of Groove Studio Brooklyn, New York.
