= Sunrise Lake (Vancouver Island) =

- Location within Vancouver Island
- Location: Vancouver Island, British Columbia
- Coordinates: 49°42′42″N 125°24′40″W
- Lake type: Natural lake
- Basin countries: Canada

Sunrise Lake is a lake on Vancouver Island north of Mount Albert Edward near the head of the Oyster River, in Strathcona Provincial Park.

== See also ==
- List of lakes of British Columbia
