= The Wilderness (play) =

1936 play by Cao Yu

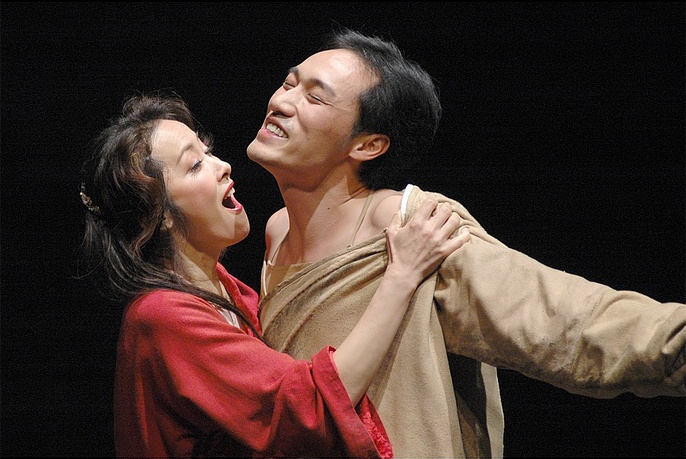
A 2007 performance of the play.

The Wilderness or The Savage Land (原野 Yuanye) is a 1936 play by Cao Yu. The play was influenced by Eugene O'Neill's expressionist theatre and relates a succession of murders and stories of revenge set in a forest. At the time the play was published, social realism was the rage in China, and critics were not pleased with the work's supernatural and fantastical elements. There was a resurgence of interest in The Wilderness in 1980, however, and Cao Yu, then 70 years old, collaborated in staging a production of his play. Other notable modern stagings include that of Wang Yansong in 2006.

== Adaptations ==
The play was made into a 1981 film The Savage Land, and an opera, of the same name by composer Jin Xiang, in 1987.
