= Sunrise Radio (Ireland) =

Irish ethnic radio station

Ireland
- Broadcast area: Greater Dublin, Ireland
- Frequency: 94.9 MHz

Programming
- Format: Community

History
- First air date: 2006

Sunrise Radio was a radio station which broadcast to the Greater Dublin area in Ireland.

It was a temporary licence station and began broadcasting in March 2006. Based in Swords, and operating on a frequency of 94.9 MHz, the station broadcast only on weekends.

Programming contributions from Polish, Russian, Chinese, Indian, African and Pakistani presenters appeared on the schedule. Programmes were a mix of English and the presenters' native tongue, with no advertising permitted under the terms of the station's licence.

The station broadcast on a temporary licence from the Broadcasting Authority of Ireland for several months in 2006 (with a licence renewal the following year), and was reputedly the "only dedicated multiethnic or polylingual radio service to broadcast" within Ireland. The station's licence was not renewed or made permanent, and the broadcast frequency was later allocated to another station, 4FM (now known as Classic Hits).
