= Sunrise Lake (New Hampshire) =

Lake in New Hampshire, United States

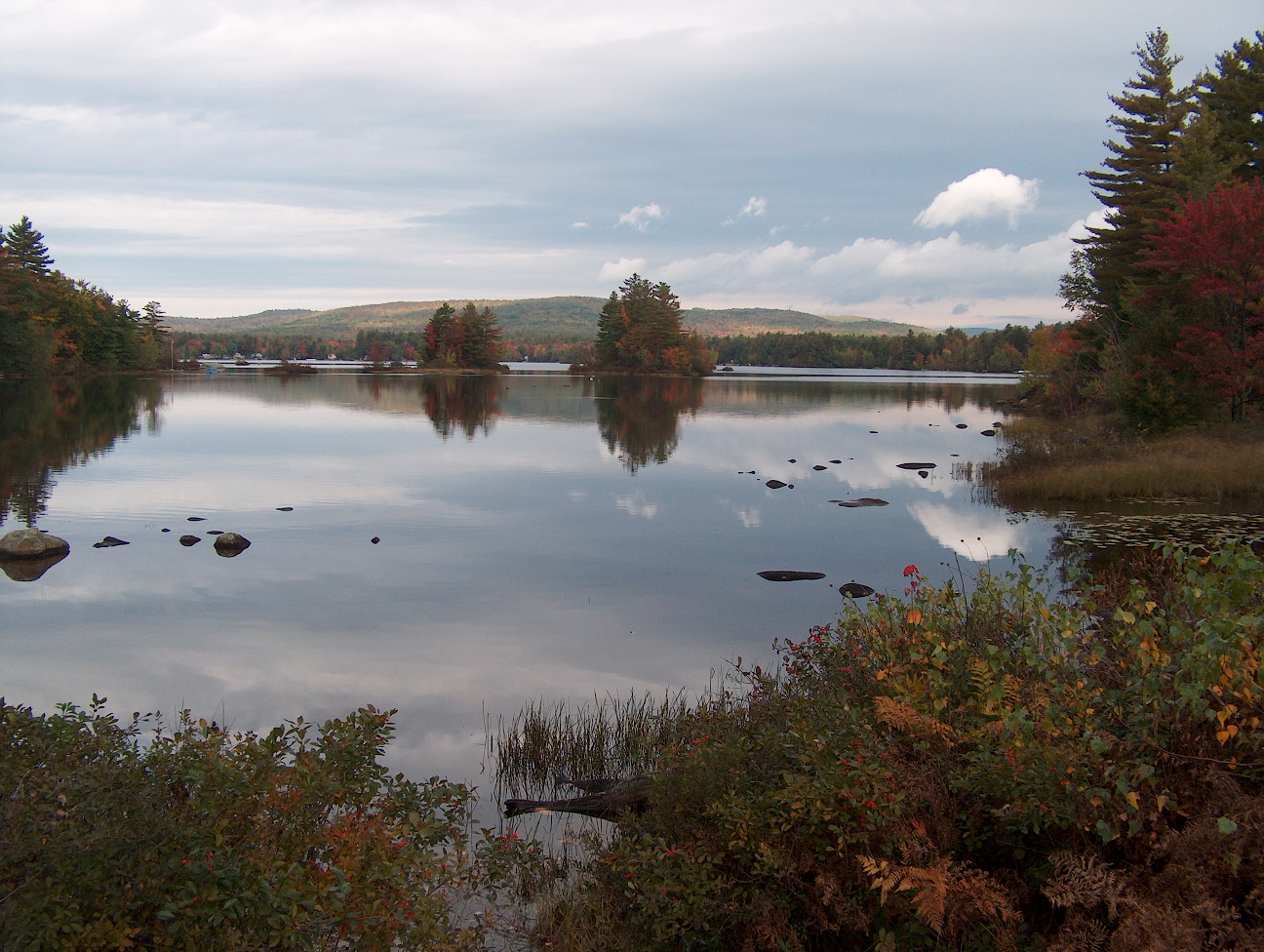

- Location within New Hampshire Location within the United States
- Location: Strafford County, New Hampshire
- Coordinates: 43°27′13″N 71°4′15″W
- Primary outflows: Dames Brook
- Basin countries: United States
- Max. length: 1.4 mi (2.3 km)
- Max. width: 0.5 mi (0.80 km)
- Surface area: 247 acres (1.00 km^{2})
- Average depth: 6 ft (1.8 m)
- Max. depth: 13 ft (4.0 m)
- Surface elevation: 665 ft (203 m)
- Islands: 4
- Settlements: Middleton

Sunrise Lake is a 247-acre (1.00 km^{2}) water body located in Strafford County in eastern New Hampshire, United States, in the town of Middleton. The lake was originally known as Dump Reservoir. Water from Sunrise Lake flows to the Cocheco River, part of the Piscataqua River watershed.

The lake is classified as a warmwater fishery, with observed species including largemouth bass, smallmouth bass, chain pickerel, brown bullhead, white perch, bluegill, and yellow perch.

== See also ==
- List of lakes in New Hampshire
