= List of Dear Boys chapters =

Dear Boys is a sports manga by Hiroki Yagami, published by Kodansha in Monthly Shōnen Magazine. The story concerns the progress of the Mizuho High School basketball team as it attempts to win the prefectural championship. It also deals heavily with the relationship between the players on the team, especially the two main characters Kazuhiko Aikawa and Takumi Fujiwara.

== Chapters ==
=== Dear Boys ===
| No. | Japanese release date | Japanese ISBN |
|---|---|---|
| 1 | December 16, 1989 | 978-4-06-302288-9 |
Scene 1: "Kazuhiko Aikawa" (哀川和彦, "Aikawa Kazuhiko"); Scene 2: "Resurrection of the Boys' Basketball Team" (男子バスケ部復活す！？, "Danshi Basuke bu Fukkatsu su!?"); Scene 3: "Silent Preparations" (静かなる始動, "Shizuka Naru Shidō"); Scene 4: "The New Teams' Debut" (新たなる出発, "Arata Naru Shuppatsu")
| 2 | April 17, 1990 | 978-4-06-302299-5 |
Scene 5: "The Day Before the Match" (試合前日, "Shiai Zenjitsu"); Scene 6: "Time In" (決戦開始, "Kessen Kaishi"); Scene 7: "Engraved Cracks" (刻まれた亀裂, "Kizama re ta Kiretsu"); Scene 8: "Half Time"
| 3 | July 17, 1990 | 978-4-06-302307-7 |
Scene 9: "Determination to Win" (誓いの先制点, "Chikai no Sensei Ten"); Scene 10: "Counterattacks Full of Wounds" (傷だらけの反撃, "Kizu Darake no Hangeki"); Scene 11: "Fifty-Fifty"; Scene 12: "Last Chance!"
| 4 | December 14, 1990 | 978-4-06-302320-6 |
Scene 13: ? (勝利の彼方に・・・, "Shōri no Kanata ni..."); Scene 14: ? (そして 新しき日々, "Soshite Atarashiki Hibi"); Scene 15: "Misty Girl"; Scene 16: ? (古傷の痛み, "Furukizu no Itami")
| 5 | April 17, 1991 | 978-4-06-302329-9 |
Scene 17: "Rusty Rain"; Scene 18: "Teammate"; Scene 19: "Turning Point"; Scene 20: "Get a Glory!"
| 6 | August 8, 1991 | 978-4-06-302338-1 |
Scene 21: "Stay Rival!"; Scene 22: ? (閉ざされた情熱, "Toza Sareta Jōnetsu"); Scene 23: "Be True!"; Scene 24: "Try Again!"
| 7 | December 13, 1991 | 978-4-06-302349-7 |
Scene 25: "Weak Point"; Scene 26: "Battle"; Scene 27: ? (夢を継ぐもの, "Yume o Tsugu Mono"); Scene 28: ? (二人の休日, "Ni Nin no Kyūjitsu")
| 8 | March 17, 1992 | 978-4-06-302356-5 |
Scene 29: ? (うるさい奴等, "Urusai Yatsura"); Scene 30: ? (夜の体育館, "Yoru no Taīkukan"); Scene 31: "Tension"; Scene 32: ? (初戦, "Shosen")
| 9 | July 17, 1992 | 978-4-06-302366-4 |
Scene 33: "We revive...."; Scene 34: ? (Burden －負担－, "Burden -Futan-"); Scene 35: ? (衝突, "Shōtotsu"); Scene 36: ? (結束のとき・・・・, "Kessoku no Toki....")
| 10 | October 17, 1992 | 978-4-06-302373-2 |
Scene 37: "Just Try It!"; Scene 38: ? (ベスト4 顔合わせ, "Besuto 4 Kaoawase"); Scene 39: "Dead Heat"; Scene 40: ? (激戦の行方, "Gekisen no Yukue")
| 11 | March 17, 1993 | 978-4-06-302385-5 |
Scene 41: "Matched game"; Scene 42: ? (マネージャーの祈り, "Manējā no Inori"); Scene 43: "Never Give Up!!"; Scene 44: ? (追撃, "Tsuigeki")
| 12 | July 17, 1993 | 978-4-06-302397-8 |
Scene 45: "The Last Moment"; Scene 46: ? (Game Set そして・・・・, "Game Set Soshite...."); Scene 47: ? (激戦の狭間に・・・・, "Gekisen no Hazama ni...."); Scene 48: "Saucy Boys"
| 13 | November 17, 1993 | 978-4-06-302410-4 |
Scene 49: "Honmoku Style!!"; Scene 50: ? (両雄出揃う, "Ryōyū Desorō"); Scene 51: "Reaction"; Scene 52: ? (本牧対策始動！！, "Honmoku Taisaku Shidō!!")
| 14 | March 17, 1994 | 978-4-06-302421-0 |
Scene 53: "Hard Training"; Scene 54: "Be Ready!"; Scene 55: "Battle Field"; Scene 56: "The Final Game"
| 15 | July 15, 1994 | 978-4-06-302438-8 |
Scene 57: ? (本牧の誤算, "Honmoku no Gosan"); Scene 58: ? (流れを変えろ！！, "Nagare o Kaero!!"); Scene 59: ? (消耗戦, "Shōmō Sen"); Scene 60: ? (戦略, "Senrya ku")
| 16 | November 17, 1994 | 978-4-06-302452-4 |
Scene 61: "Rough and Tough"; Scene 62: "Mentality"; Scene 63: "Cool It"; Scene 64: "Don't Stop"
| 17 | March 16, 1995 | 978-4-06-302466-1 |
Scene 65: "Count Down!"; Scene 66: "Wanna Be Strong"; Scene 67: "Sunrise Sunset"; Scene 68: "Helter-Skelter"
| 18 | July 17, 1995 | 978-4-06-302480-7 |
Scene 69: ? (再会, "Saikai"); Scene 70: "Each Time Each Mind"; Scene 71: ? (好敵手（ライバル）たち, "Kōtekishu (Raibaru) Tachi"); Scene 72: "Touch And Go"
| 19 | November 16, 1995 | 978-4-06-302496-8 |
Scene 73: "Higher Than"; Scene 74: ? (猛攻 明和大日立！, "Mōkō Meiwa dai Hitachi!"); Scene 75: ? (越えるべき者, "Koeru Beki Mono"); Scene 76: "Indication"
| 20 | March 16, 1996 | 978-4-06-333510-1 |
Scene 77: ? (突破口, "Toppakō"); Scene 78: "Pride And Fight"; Scene 79: "Tomorrow"; Scene 80: "Dead End"
| 21 | July 17, 1996 | 978-4-06-333525-5 |
Scene 81: "Revenge"; Scene 82: "Masquerade"; Scene 83: "Sforzando"; Scene 84: ? (偶然と必然, "Gūzen to Hitsuzen")
| 22 | November 15, 1996 | 978-4-06-333542-2 |
Scene 85: "Discord"; Scene 86: "Wanderer"; Scene 87: "Fragile"; Scene 88: "Here Comes The..."
| 23 | March 17, 1997 | 978-4-06-333560-6 |
Scene 89: "Hide And Seek"; Scene 90: ? (君色に染まる時, "Kun Shoku ni Somaru Toki"); Scene 91: "Re・Dream"; Scene 92: ? (君のメロディー, "Kun no Merodī")

=== Dear Boys The Early Days ===
| No. | Japanese release date | Japanese ISBN |
|---|---|---|
| 1 | August 12, 1997 | 978-4-06-333586-6 |
1st quarter: "Nerves"; 2nd quarter: ? (彼の中の静かな革命, "Kare no Naka no Shizuka na Kakumei"); 3rd quarter: "Loose Boys Stand Up Please!?"; 4th quarter: "We Can Do!!"

=== Dear Boys Act II ===
| No. | Japanese release date | Japanese ISBN |
|---|---|---|
| 1 | November 17, 1997 | 978-4-06-333601-6 |
Scene 1: "Newcomers"; Scene 2: "Beginning"; Scene 3: "The First Meeting" (第1種接近遭遇！, "Dai 1 Shu Sekkin Sōgū!"); Scene 4: "3 Piece Section" (3ピース・セッション, "3 Pīsu.Sesshon")
| 2 | May 15, 1998 | 978-4-06-333624-5 |
Scene 5: "Dog Fight"; Scene 6: "Who are you?"; Scene 7: "His Stoicism"; Scene 8: "Growth Rate"; Scene 9: "King's Portrait" (王者の肖像, "Ōja no Shōzō")
| 3 | September 17, 1998 | 978-4-06-333642-9 |
Scene 10: "The Tainted Pride" (プライドの狭間, "Puraido no Hazama"); Scene 11: "Searching for that One Place" (もとめる者、その場所, "Mo Tomeru Mono, Sono Basho"); Scene 12: "New Players!!" (ルーキー！！, "Rūkī!!"); Scene 13: "His Aims!" (彼の狙い, "Kare no Nerai"); Scene 14: "The Two People..." (ふたり・・・・, "Futari....")
| 4 | April 16, 1999 | 978-4-06-333674-0 |
Scene 15: "Go to the Top"; Scene 16: "First Match" (初陣, "Uijin"); Scene 17: "Sixman"; Scene 18: "Kanagawa Prefecture's Top 4" (神奈川県トップ4, "Kanagawa Ken Toppu 4"); Scene 19: "Blue and Red, Chance Meeting Once Again" (青と赤 再びの邂逅, "Ao to Aka Futatabi no Kaikō")
| 5 | August 17, 1999 | 978-4-06-333691-7 |
Scene 20: "Renewal" (リニューアル, "Rinyūaru"); Scene 21: "(Switch) On and Off" (（スイッチ）オン&オフ, "(Suicchi) On & Ofu"); Scene 22: "Five Men in One Day"; Scene 23: "Random Attack" (打ちまくる！！！, "Uchimakuru!!!"); Scene 24: "Catastrophe?"
| 6 | March 16, 2000 | 978-4-06-333716-7 |
Scene 25: "Steady Persons"; Scene 26: "Satisfaction"; Scene 27: "Inside, Inside!!" (インサイド・インサイド！！, "Insaido.Insaido!!"); Scene 28: "His Role"; Scene 29: "Offense and Defense Under the Basket" (ゴール下の攻防, "Gōru ka no Kōbō")
| 7 | July 17, 2000 | 978-4-06-333730-3 |
Scene 30: "Outside Plus" (プラス・アウトサイド, "Purasu.Auto Saido"); Scene 31: ? (追い上げる！！, "Oiageru!!"); Scene 32: ? (真っ向勝負！, "Makkō Shōbu!"); Scene 33: ? (マジモード, "Majimōdo"); Scene 34: "Dilemma"
| 8 | November 16, 2000 | 978-4-06-333747-1 |
Scene 35: "On Fire!"; Scene 36: "Regret (Vanish Time)"; Scene 37: "Growing Soul"; Scene 38: "First Contact" (ファースト・コンタクト, "Fāsuto.Kontakuto"); Scene 39: "Vision"
| 9 | April 17, 2001 | 978-4-06-333766-2 |
Scene 40: ? (寡黙な痛み, "Kamoku na Itami"); Scene 41: "Make a Choice"; Scene 42: "Get Ready!!"; Scene 43: "Decisive Game"; Scene 44: "Control Game"
| 10 | September 17, 2001 | 978-4-06-333787-7 |
Scene 45: "Wild Card"; Scene 46: "Break through"; Scene 47: "Tactical Point"; Scene 48: "Ride on Wave!"; Scene 49: ? (募る想い・・・・, "Tsunoru Omoi....")
| 11 | March 15, 2002 | 978-4-06-333816-4 |
Scene 50: "Go Ahead"; Scene 51: ? (神奈川代表, "Kanagawa Daihyō"); Scene 52: "Step by Step"; Scene 53: "Aspiration"; Scene 54: ? (さまよう目標, "Samayō Mokuhyō")
| 12 | July 17, 2002 | 978-4-06-333835-5 |
Scene 55: "Contrast"; Scene 56: "Summer Planning"; Scene 57: ? (夏合宿, "Natsu Gasshuku"); Scene 58: "All Comers"; Scene 59: ? (明日を担う者, "Ashita o Ninau Mono")
| 13 | November 15, 2002 | 978-4-06-333851-5 |
Scene 60: ? (情熱の行方, "Jōnetsu no Yukue"); Scene 61: "My Way"; Scene 62: ? (夢の続き・・・・, "Yume no Tsuduki...."); Scene 63: "Look Back"
| 14 | May 16, 2003 | 978-4-06-333881-2 |
Scene 64: ? (消えない轍, "Kie Nai Wadachi"); Scene 65: "Time Leap"; Scene 66: ? (拓かれた路, "Hiraka re ta Michi"); Scene 67: "Strong Will"; Scene 68: "Confidence"
| 15 | September 17, 2003 | 978-4-06-333899-7 |
Scene 69: ? (インターハイ開幕, "Intāhai Kaimaku"); Scene 70: "Spark"; Scene 71: "Pace Up"; Scene 72: ? (オレ達のやり方, "Ore Tachi no Yarikata"); Scene 73: ? (自分の役割, "Jibun no Yakuwari")
| 16 | March 17, 2004 | 978-4-06-333927-7 |
Scene 74: "Collapse"; Scene 75: "Next!!"; Scene 76: "Burning Start!!!!"; Scene 77: "Puzzling Attack!!!!"; Scene 78: "Getting Hot!!!!"
| 17 | August 17, 2004 | 978-4-06-333949-9 |
Scene 79: "Going Drive!!!!"; Scene 80: "Taking Order!!!!"; Scene 81: "Coming Limit!!!!"; Scene 82: "Leading Shooter!!!!"; Scene 83: "Running Fire!!!!"
| 18 | February 17, 2005 | 978-4-06-370973-5 |
Scene 84: "Fighting Ace!!!!"; Scene 85: "Matching Attack!!!!"; Scene 86: "Marching Orders!!!!"; Scene 87: "Key Player"; Scene 88: ? (不安な夜, "Fuan na Yoru")
| 19 | June 17, 2005 | 978-4-06-370994-0 |
Scene 89: "Manifesto"; Scene 90: "Outburst"; Scene 91: "Territory"; Scene 92: ? (標的, "Hyōteki")
| 20 | September 16, 2005 | 978-4-06-371009-0 |
Scene 93: "T.M.Confusion"; Scene 94: "A Stone in Mind"; Scene 95: "Takashina Style?"; Scene 96: ? (本意ならざる・・・・, "Honi Nara Zaru....")
| 21 | February 16, 2006 | 978-4-06-371027-4 |
Scene 97: "A Long Shot!!"; Scene 98: "Difference And Consensus"; Scene 99: "In A Body"; Scene 100: ? (萌芽, "Hōga")
| 22 | June 16, 2006 | 978-4-06-371048-9 |
Scene 101: "Stick to Will"; Scene 102: "Select One"; Scene 103: "Put Together"; Scene 104: ? (タカキキザハシヘアユムヒ, "Takakikizahashiheayumuhi")
| 23 | October 17, 2006 | 978-4-06-371061-8 |
Scene 105: ? (見えない力, "Mie Nai Chikara"); Scene 106: ? (マイペース&ユアペース, "Maipēsu & Yuapēsu"); Scene 107: ? (明日のための今日, "Ashita no Tame no Kyō"); Scene 108: "Forecast"
| 24 | January 17, 2007 | 978-4-06-371074-8 |
Scene 109: ? (双剣と白壁, "Sō Ken to Shirakabe"); Scene 110: ? (強豪の信念, "Kyōgō no Shinnen"); Scene 111: "Attachment To The Ball"; Scene 112: "Slow But Steady"
| 25 | June 15, 2007 | 978-4-06-371093-9 |
Scene 113: "Reinforce"; Scene 114: "Mind Over Body"; Scene 115: "Now Is Tte Moment!!"; Scene 116: "Coup De Grace"
| 26 | October 17, 2007 | 978-4-06-371112-7 |
Scene 117: ? ("最強"の称号, ""Saikyō" no Shōgō"); Scene 118: ? (グ者道は彼岸を目指す, "Gusha Dō ha Higan o Mezasu"); Scene 119: "Calm Ffame"; Scene 120: "Responsibilities"
| 27 | February 15, 2008 | 978-4-06-371126-4 |
Scene 121: "The Majestic Four"; Scene 122: "Blow For Blow"; Scene 123: ? (逆襲 明和大日立, "Gyakushū Meiwa Dai Hitachi"); Scene 124: "Blade Unsheathed"
| 28 | June 17, 2008 | 978-4-06-371150-9 |
Scene 125: ? ("誇り"と"自覚", ""Hokori" to "Jikaku""); Scene 126: ? (反撃と反撃, "Hangeki to Hangeki"); Scene 127: "Floor Generals"; Scene 128: ? (任せられない男, "Makase Rare Nai Otoko")
| 29 | October 17, 2008 | 978-4-06-371165-3 |
Scene 129: "Just Another Option"; Scene 130: ? (2つの軌道, "Futatsu no Kidō"); Scene 131: "Winning Is Everything"; Scene 132: "After Trial And Error"
| 30 | February 17, 2009 | 978-4-06-371180-6 |
Scene 133: ? (紫の結晶 精錬の瞬間, "Murasaki no Kesshō Seiren no Shunkan"); Scene 134: "The Day of Liberation"; Scene 135: "Prelude for Act3 (Part 1)"; Scene 136: "Prelude for Act3 (Part 2)"

=== Dear Boys Act 3 ===
| No. | Japanese release date | Japanese ISBN |
|---|---|---|
| 1 | June 6, 2009 | 978-4-06-371201-8 |
Scene 1: ? (いつか目指した日, "Itsuka Mezashi ta hi"); Scene 2: "Touch Me If You Can"; Scene 3: "Stronger or Faster"; Scene 4: "Branched Ever After"
| 2 | October 16, 2009 | 978-4-06-371212-4 |
Scene 5: "Rise"; Scene 6: "Cleverly and Cruelly"; Scene 7: "Wildborn"; Scene 8: "Sharpened Up!"
| 3 | February 17, 2010 | 978-4-06-371232-2 |
Scene 9: "'Three' is the farthest number"; Scene 10: "Can you fly high?"; Scene 11: "Between the lines"; Scene 12: "Admirable Discretion"
| 4 | June 17, 2010 | 978-4-06-371249-0 |
Scene 13: "Don't Underestimate Me！"; Scene 14: "Just Standing"; Scene 15: "What For..."; Scene 16: "Reignition"
| 5 | October 15, 2010 | 978-4-06-371260-5 |
Scene 17: ? (崩れ落ちる瞬間(とき), "Kuzureochiru Shunkan (Toki)"); Scene 18: "Hardening"; Scene 19: ? (タイセツナモノ, "Taisetsunamono"); Scene 20: "The Shooter"
| 6 | February 17, 2011 | 978-4-06-371275-9 |
Scene 21: "Hard Lines"; Scene 22: "Strength Of Two"; Scene 23: "One Shot, And..."; Scene 24: "The Blue Blaze"
| 7 | June 17, 2011 | 978-4-06-371290-2 |
Scene 25: "Ever Evolving"; Scene 26: "Turn Of The Tide"; Scene 27: "Acceleration"; Scene 28: "Shoot After Shoot"
| 8 | October 17, 2011 | 978-4-06-371306-0 |
Scene 29: "Probability Of Victory"; Scene 30: "Just A Few"; Scene 31: "Closer"; Scene 32: ? (3度目の結末, "3 Dome no Ketsumatsu")
| 9 | February 17, 2012 | 978-4-06-371322-0 |
Scene 33: ? (運命の渦, "Unmei no Uzu"); Scene 34: ? (絶対王者, "Zettai Ōja"); Scene 35: "A Bottle Of Feelings"; Scene 36: ? (真夏の夜の"夢", "Manatsu no Yoru no "Yume"")
| 10 | June 15, 2012 | 978-4-06-371333-6 |
Scene 37: ? (その日の朝, "Sono hi no Asa"); Scene 38: ? (瑞穂、孤立。, "Mizuho, Koritsu"); Scene 39: ? (掌握, "Shōaku"); Scene 40: "Heaviness And Sharpness"
| 11 | October 17, 2012 | 978-4-06-371349-7 |
Scene 41: ? (野性と理性, "Yasei to Risei"); Scene 42: "Bond Of "Friendship""; Scene 43: "Chained Hero"; Scene 44: "Stronger Than Yesterday"
| 12 | February 15, 2013 | 978-4-06-371365-7 |
Scene 45: "Always Around"; Scene 46: ? (2つのキセキ, "Tsu no Kiseki"); Scene 47: "Screener" (スクリーナー, "Sukurīnā"); Scene 48: ? (エースの証明, "Ēsu no Shōmei")
| 13 | June 17, 2013 | 978-4-06-371378-7 |
Scene 49: "Slow Starter" (スロースターター, "Surō Sutātā"); Scene 50: "Dark Cloud Gathering"; Scene 51: "Vacancy"; Scene 52: ? (去就, "Kyoshū")
| 14 | October 17, 2013 | 978-4-06-371392-3 |
Scene 53: "Power For Power"; Scene 54: ? (痛みあればこそ, "Itami Areba Koso"); Scene 55: "Bridge In The Sky"; Scene 56: "Out Or Not Out"
| 15 | February 17, 2014 | 978-4-06-371410-4 |
Scene 57: "Re-Rise"; Scene 58: ? (情熱の旋律, "Jōnetsu no Senritsu"); Scene 59: "Free Throw" (フリースロー, "Furī Surō"); Scene 60: "Ace And Around"; Dear Boys Act3.1
| 16 | June 17, 2014 | 978-4-06-371424-1 |
Scene 61: "Victory, Quartered"; Scene 62: "The Last Interval"; Scene 63: "Whatever"; Scene 64: "The Chaser Or The Chased"
| 17 | October 17, 2014 | 978-4-06-371441-8 |
Scene 65: "Head To Head"; Scene 66: ? (かくも長き焦燥, "Kaku mo Nagaki Shōsō"); Scene 67: ? (自分が自分であるために, "Jibun ga Jibundearu Tame ni"); Scene 68: ? (射程圏内, "Shatei Kennai")
| 18 | February 17, 2015 | 978-4-06-371456-2 |
Scene 69: "Operation"; Scene 70: ? (この瞬間を待っていた！, "Kono Shunkan o Matteita！"); Scene 71: ? (おまえがいたから‥‥, "Omae ga Itakara‥‥"); Scene 72: "Count Zero"
| 19 | June 17, 2015 | 978-4-06-371472-2 |
Scene 73: ? (みんなの力をオレに, "Minna no Chikara o Ore ni"); Scene 74: ? (未知の領域, "Michi no Ryōiki"); Scene 75: ? (隠し球, "Kakushidama"); Scene 76: ? (限界点, "Genkaiten")
| 20 | October 16, 2015 | 978-4-06-371487-6 |
Scene 77: ? (託す者と託される者, "Takusu Mono to Takusareru Mono"); Scene 78: ? (引き継がれる想い, "Hikitsugareru Omoi"); Scene 79: ? (あの時の続き‥‥, "Ano Toki no Tsuzuki ‥ ‥"); Scene 80: ? (独りじゃない, "Hitori Janai")
| 21 | February 17, 2016 | 978-4-06-392509-8 |
Scene 81: ? (以心伝心, "Ishindenshin"); Scene 82: "Last Pass" (ラストパス, "Rasuto Pasu"); Scene 83: ? (死闘の果てに‥‥, "Shitō no Hate ni‥‥"); Scene Last: "Dear Boys"

=== Dear Boys Over Time ===
| No. | Japanese release date | Japanese ISBN |
|---|---|---|
| 1 | June 17, 2016 | 978-4-06-392530-2 |
Scene 1: ? (道しるべ, "Michishirube"); Scene 2: ? (あの笑顔のために････, "Ano Egao no Tame ni...."); Scene 3: "Promise" (約束, "Yakusoku"); Scene 4: ? (世代交代, "Sedai Kōtai")
| 2 | October 17, 2016 | 978-4-06-392557-9 |
Scene 5: "進化"; Scene 6: "新生"; Scene 7: "受け継ぐ者"; Scene 8: "時を越えて"
| 3 | February 17, 2017 | 978-4-06-392566-1 |
Scene 9: "最強の武器"; Scene 10: "信念とスタイル"; Scene 11: "夢の続き"; Scene Last: "最高の仲間達"

=== Dear Boys Act 4 ===
| No. | Japanese release date | Japanese ISBN |
|---|---|---|
| 1 | March 15, 2019 | 978-4-06-514815-0 |
| 2 | July 17, 2019 | 978-4-06-516297-2 |
| 3 | November 15, 2019 | 978-4-06-517630-6 |
| 4 | March 17, 2020 | 978-4-06-518654-1 |
| 5 | July 17, 2020 | 978-4-06-520230-2 |
| 6 | November 17, 2020 | 978-4-06-521422-0 |
| 7 | March 17, 2021 | 978-4-06-522260-7 |
| 8 | June 17, 2021 | 978-4-06-524134-9 |
| 9 | November 17, 2021 | 978-4-06-525036-5 |
| 10 | March 17, 2022 | 978-4-06-526768-4 |
| 11 | July 14, 2022 | 978-4-06-528264-9 |
| 12 | November 16, 2022 | 978-4-06-529672-1 |
| 13 | March 16, 2023 | 978-4-06-530777-9 |
| 14 | July 14, 2023 | 978-4-06-531988-8 |
| 15 | November 16, 2023 | 978-4-06-533714-1 |
| 16 | March 15, 2024 | 978-4-06-534797-3 |
| 17 | July 17, 2024 | 978-4-06-536244-0 |
| 18 | November 15, 2024 | 978-4-06-536244-0 |
| 19 | March 17, 2025 | 978-4-06-538851-8 |
| 20 | July 16, 2025 | 978-4-06-539878-4 |
| 21 | November 17, 2025 | 978-4-06-541251-0 |
| 22 | March 17, 2026 | 978-4-06-542604-3 |
