= Wan Fang =

Chinese playwright, novelist, and screenwriter

Wan Fang (Chinese: 万方, born 1952 in Beijing) is a Chinese playwright, novelist, and screenwriter. She was awarded the Lao She Literary Award in 2014. Her father was Cao Yu (1910—1996), one of China's best-known playwrights.

== Works ==
- There is a Kind of Poison 有一种毒药 play 2006
- Guanxi, play 2009
- libretto for The Savage Land, a 1987 opera
- screenplay for Colors of the Blind, a 1997 film
- Nothing in the Mirror, a 2001 TV series
