= The Savage Land (opera) =

Opera by Jin Xiang

poster for the Shenzhen Youth Opera production 2016

The Savage Land (原野 Yuanye) is a 1987 Chinese-language western-style opera by composer Jin Xiang to a libretto by Wan Fang (万方 born 1952) after her own father Cao Yu's 1937 play The Wilderness (also 原野 Yuanye). It was performed at the John F. Kennedy Center for the Performing Arts in Washington in 1992, in 1997 at the Saarländisches Staatstheater in Saarbrücken under the baton of You-Sheng Lin, then again in Vancouver in 1998. Shenzhen Youth Opera presented Jin Xiang's work in 2016.
