= Cao Yu =

Chinese playwright (1910–1996)

- 曹禺
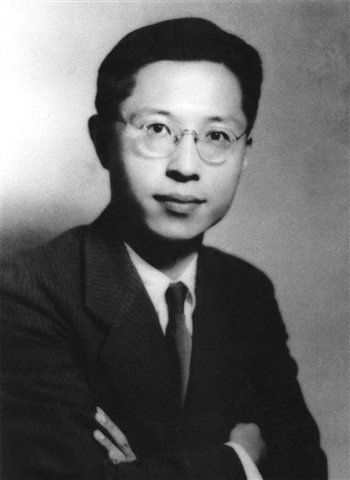
- Cao in the late 30s/early 40s
- Born: Wan Jiabao; September 24, 1910; Qianjiang, Hubei, Qing China
- Died: December 13, 1996 (aged 86); Beijing, China
- Education: Nankai High School; Tsinghua University
- Occupation: Playwright
- Spouses: Zheng Xiu (m. 1937–1951) Fang Rui (m. 1951–1974) Li Yuru (m. 1979–1996)
- Children: Daughter: Wan Fang, etc.
- Writing career
- Language: Chinese
- Period: 1933–1996
- Genre: Drama
- Notable works: Thunderstorm; Sunrise

Cao Yu
- Chinese: 曹禺
Transcriptions
Standard Mandarin
- Hanyu Pinyin: Cáo Yú
- Wade–Giles: Tsʻao² Yü²

Wan Jiabao
- Traditional Chinese: 萬家寶
- Simplified Chinese: 万家宝
Transcriptions
Standard Mandarin
- Hanyu Pinyin: Wàn Jiābǎo
- Wade–Giles: Wan Chia-pao

Cao Yu (Note: In this Chinese name, the family name is Cao and Wan.) (Chinese: 曹禺; Wade–Giles: Tsʻao Yü, September 24, 1910 – December 13, 1996) was a Chinese playwright, often regarded as one of China's most important playwrights of the 20th century. His best-known works are Thunderstorm (1933), Sunrise (1936) and Peking Man (1940). It is largely through the efforts of Cao Yu that the modern Chinese "spoken theatre" took root in 20th century Chinese literature.

Cao Yu was the president of China's Premier Modern Drama Theatre, the chairman of the China Theatre Association (1968–1998) and established the Beijing People's Art Theatre in 1952. Cao Yu is regarded as the paramount playwright of modern Chinese drama, "enthroned as China's Shakespeare" according to The Columbia Anthology of Modern Chinese Drama.

== Name ==
Cao Yu, the name most associated with this playwright, was a pen name; his birth name was Wan Jiabao (simplified Chinese: 万家宝; traditional Chinese: 萬家寶).

The pseudonym 曹禺; Cáo Yú was originated from his surname 萬; Wàn. Cao dismantled the character into its graphical components 艹; cǎo; 'grass radical' and 禺; yú; 'region', 'district'. Since the radical 艹; cǎo could not be used as a surname, he chose the near-homophonic character 曹; Cáo as the substitution and combined the two character to form 曹禺; Cáo Yú.

== Early life, 1910–1920 ==
Cao Yu was born as Wan Jiabao in an upper-class family in Qianjiang in the province of Hubei, 1910. When he was still an infant, his family's business interests necessitated a move to Tianjin where his father worked for a time as secretary to China's president, Li Yuanhong. Tianjin was a cosmopolitan city with a strong western influence, and during his childhood, Yu's mother would often take him to see western style plays, which were gaining in popularity at the time, as well as to productions of Chinese traditional opera.

Such western style spoken theatre, or huaju, made inroads in China under the influence of noted intellectuals such as Chen Duxiu and Hu Shih, who were proponents of a wider cultural renewal campaign of the era, marked by anti-imperialism, and a re-evaluation of Chinese cultural institutions, such as Confucianism. The enterprise crystallized in 1919, in the so-called May Fourth Movement.

== Literary beginnings – 1920s ==
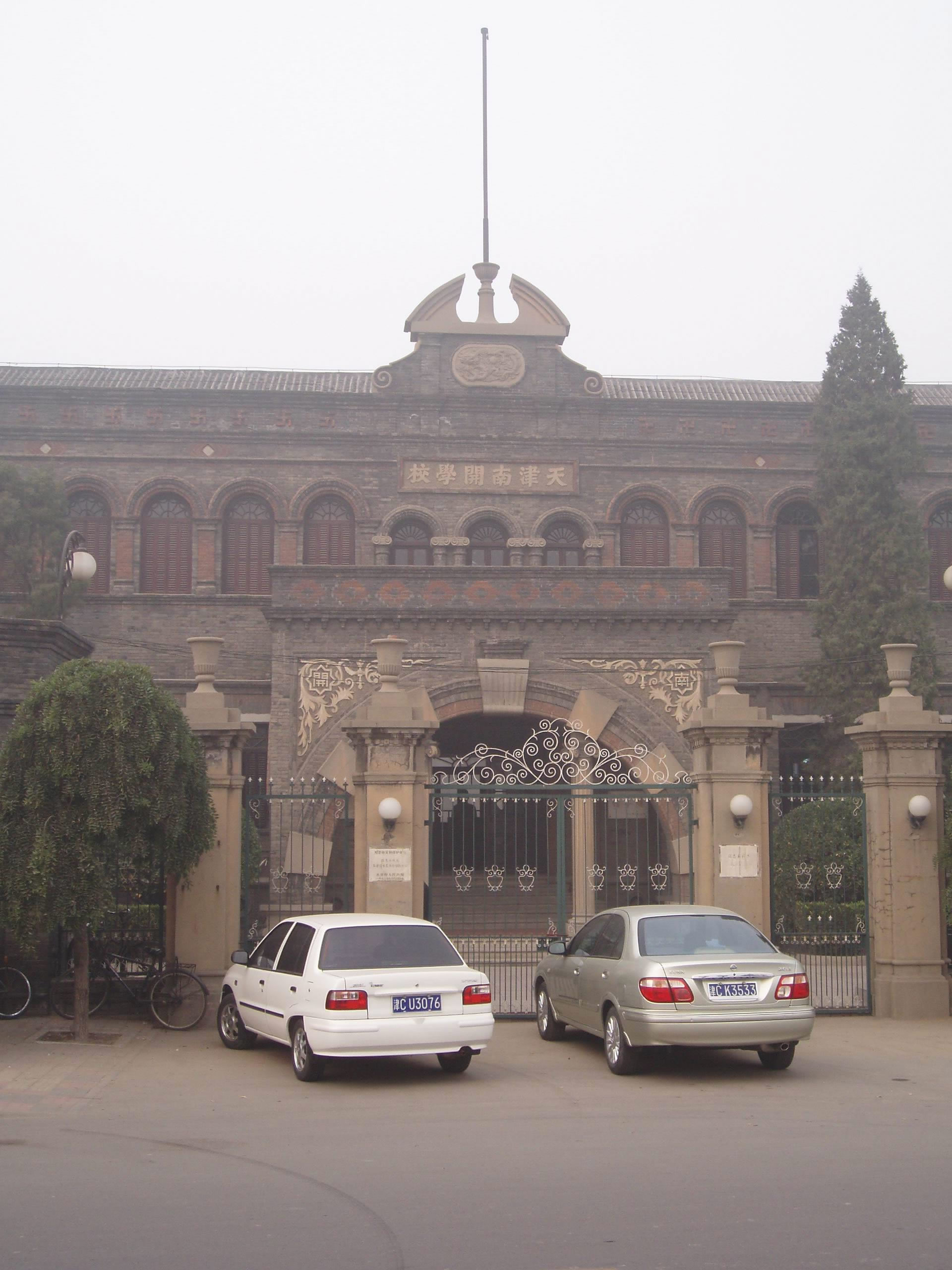
The secondary school in Nankai, where Cao Yu studied and acted in western plays

Between 1920 and 1924, Cao Yu attended Tianjin Nankai High School, which offered a Western style study program. The school maintained a society of dramatic arts in which the students produced Western plays, notably those of Henrik Ibsen and Eugene O'Neill, authors well known in China thanks to translations by Hu Shih. Philosophy instructor P. C. Chang—educated in the United States on a Boxer Indemnity Scholarship—was a major proponent of these stage dramas. Chang began organizing school theatre productions in 1923, inaugurating a Nankai tradition. Cao Yu took acting roles in a number of the society's dramatic productions, even going so far as to assume the female role of Nora in Ibsen's A Doll's House. He is also known to have assisted in the translation of Englishman John Galsworthy's 1909 work, Strife.

After finishing his studies at Nankai secondary school, Cao Yu first matriculated at Nankai University's Department of Political Science but transferred the next year to Tsinghua University, where he would study until graduating in 1934 with a degree in Western Languages and Literature. During his university studies, Cao Yu improved his abilities in both Russian and English. His course of studies required reading the works of such western authors as Bernard Shaw and Eugene O'Neill, and of Russian authors such as Anton Chekhov and Maxim Gorky, as well as translated works of classic Greek writers, Euripides and Aeschylus. This immersion in western literature would mark Yu's style in all writing genres including the "spoken theater" which had had little tradition in China prior to Yu's influence (as opposed to sung Chinese opera), . During the course of his last year at the university, Cao Yu completed his first work, Thunderstorm, which would mark a milestone in Chinese theater's history of the 20th century.

While works of Chinese playwrights previous to Cao Yu are of fundamentally historical interest and were famed in China, they garnered little critical success or popularity on the international stage. By contrast, the works of Cao Yu were marked by a whirlwind of worldwide interest, turning him into the first Chinese playwright of international renown.

== The First "Golden Age" of Huaju (spoken drama) mid-1930s ==
Cao Yu's trilogy, Thunderstorm (1934), Sunrise (1936) and Wilderness (1937) helped to usher the modern Chinese drama into the first "Golden Age" in the mid-1930s. These plays and their productions marked the maturation of Chinese dramatic literature and achievement in professionalism in staging production, including lighting, props, sets and costumes.

Cao Yu's works launched the wave of "realistic drama" in the 1930s, which reflected the society's different sides and served as the instrument of criticism.

The leading figures in the modern Chinese spoken drama including Cao Yu, Hong Shen, Guo Moruo, Xia Yan, Ouyang Yuqian, Tian Han and Lao She composed a new trend of Chinese spoken drama, that interpreted the drama as a critique of the whole society and social values, and aroused the masses of the people.

=== Thunderstorm (雷雨 Lei yu), (1934) ===
Thunderstorm is considered as one of the most popular dramatic Chinese works of the period prior to the Japanese invasion of China in 1937. It was first published in the literary magazine, Literary Quarterly (wenxue jikan), which was founded in 1934 by Chinese intellectuals, Zheng Zhenduo and Jin Yi. Shortly after its publication, a production of the play was mounted in Jinan, and later, in 1935, in Shanghai and in Tokyo, both of which were well received. In 1936, Thunderstorm debuted in Nanjing, with Cao Yu himself acting in the lead role. In 1938, following its theatrical triumphs, the play was made into two separate movies productions, one in Shanghai and another in Hong Kong, that were almost coincidental versions of one another. The latter production, made in 1957, co-starred a young Bruce Lee in one of his few non-fighting roles.

The plot of Thunderstorm centers on one family's psychological and physical destruction as a result of incest, as perpetrated at the hands of its morally depraved and corrupt patriarch, Zhou Puyuan. Although it is undisputed that the prodigious reputation achieved by Thunderstorm was due in large part to its scandalous public airing of the topic of incest, and many people have pointed out technical imperfections in its structure, Thunderstorm is nevertheless considered to be a milestone in China's modern theatrical ascendancy. Even those who have questioned the literary prowess of Cao Yu, for instance, the noted critic C.T. Hsia, admit that the popularization and consolidation of China's theatrical genre is fundamentally owed to the first works of Cao Yu.

=== Sunrise (日出 Richu), 1936 and The Wilderness (原野 Yuanye), 1937 ===
In Cao Yu's second play, Sunrise, published in 1936, he continues his thematic treatment of the progressive moral degradation of individuals in the face of a hostile society. In the play, the history of several Shanghai women are narrated; their stories show their lives disintegrating in response to lack of affection and of acknowledgment by the society surrounding them, leading them down a tragic path from which they cannot escape. By centring upon the female characters, Cao Yu introduced feminism ideas and included the early enlightenment of women's liberation in his works.

In 1937, Cao Yu's third play, The Wilderness (the Chinese name of which can also be translated as The Field), was released, but enjoyed less attention than his previous works.

== During the Japanese occupation, 1937–1946 ==
After the Japanese invasion of China in 1937, Cao Yu took shelter in the central city of Chongqing, along with the government of Chiang Kai-shek. There he wrote his fourth work, The Metamorphosis, which greatly departed from his previous works, concerning itself with patriotic exaltation. Produced for the first time in 1939, the play is set in a military hospital that is bombed by the Japanese army. Although a change for Cao Yu, he was in good company as concentrating on war themes and settings was favored by most of the prominent Chinese writers active during the Second Sino-Japanese war in areas controlled by the government of Chongqing. By contrast, in northern China, controlled by Mao Zedong's communists, an altogether different type of literature was developing, dedicated to exalting the communist movement.

=== Peking Man (北京人 Beijing ren), 1940 ===
In 1940, Cao Yu completed the writing of his fifth play, Peking Man, considered his most profound and successful work. Set in Peking (today Beijing) as its name implies, and in the then present, surprisingly the work does not allude to the war with Japan at all, but chronicles the history of a well-heeled family that is incapable of surviving and adapting to social changes which are destroying the traditional world and culture in which they live. The title of the work is an allusion to the so-called Peking Man, the proto-human who inhabited the north of China several hundred thousand years ago. Cao Yu's recurrent themes are present, emphasizing the inability of traditional families to adapt themselves to modern society and its customs and ways.

In 1941, while still in Chongqing, Cao Yu completed a theatrical adaptation of the famous work, The Family, by novelist, Ba Jin. His last written work during the Japanese occupation was The Bridge, published in 1945 but not produced as a play until 1947, after the end of the war . During his tenure in Chongqing, Cao Yu taught classes in the city's School of Dramatic Art and completed a translation into Chinese of William Shakespeare's Romeo and Juliet in 1948.

== Visit to the United States, 1946 ==
Following the end of the war, Cao Yu traveled to the United States with another celebrated Chinese writer Lao She as the guests of U.S. state department in 1946. Together, the two spent 11 months touring the U.S. for teaching Chinese drama to the academic audiences. After returning to China, Cao Yu was hired by a movie studio based in Shanghai to write the screenplay and to direct the 1946 released movie, Day of the Radiant Sun (艷陽天 / 艳阳天; Yànyángtiān).

== After the founding of the People's Republic, 1949 ==
After the founding of the People's Republic of China in 1949, Cao Yu became the director of the Popular Theater Art League, a post he held for the rest of his life. In his youth Cao Yu had been critical of Communist ideology. But his first works, with their portrait of decline and cruelty brought on by bourgeois society, were admitting of a Marxist interpretation. Thus they became very popular in 1960s Chinese society, when the ideology of Mao Zedong demanded that all literary creation serve the Communist cause. During this period, Cao Yu became a social activist.

In addition to supervising successive production of his earliest plays, Cao Yu kept on writing, and in 1956, published Bright Skies. Thereafter, in 1961, the decade of his major public recognition, he published Courage and the Sword (膽劍篇 / 胆剑篇 Dan jian pian), his first historical drama. This work, although set at the end of the Zhou dynasty during the Warring States period, contains pronounced allusions to the defeat of Mao's political ideology as embodied in his Great Leap Forward. His and others' critiques of Mao, and the struggle for power in the halls of government, ultimately ended in the Cultural Revolution, which Mao used to reaffirm his power and fight against "bourgeois and capitalist elements" in politics and culture. The attacks against intellectuals during the Cultural Revolution affected Cao Yu, causing him distress and alienation. However, he was rehabilitated himself after Mao's death and Deng Xiaoping's subsequent rise to power.

Cao Yu's last work was Wang Zhaojun (王昭君), released in 1979. On December 13, 1996, at 86 years of age, Cao Yu died in Beijing.

Cao Yu's daughter Wan Fang is also a playwright.

== Bibliography ==
=== Theatre ===
- Thunderstorm (雷雨 Leiyu), 1934.
- Sunrise (日出 Richu), 1936.
- The Wilderness (原野 Yuanye), 1937.
- The Metamorphosis (蛻變 / 蜕变 Tuibian), 1940.
- Peking Man (北京人 Beijing ren), 1940.
- The Bridge (橋 / 桥 Qiao), 1945.
- Bright Skies (明朗的天 Minlang de tian), 1956.
- Courage and the Sword (膽劍篇 / 胆剑篇 Dan jian pian), 1961.
- Wang Zhaojun (王昭君 Wang Zhaojun), 1979.

=== Translation ===
- William Shakespeare, Romeo and Juliet (柔蜜欧与幽丽叶 Roumiou yu Youliye), 1948

=== Theatrical adaptation ===
- Ba Jin, Family (家 Jia), 1941

=== Publication ===
- Plays (论戏剧 Lun Xiju), 1985.

== Note ==
Cultural offices
Previous: Tian Han	Chairman of China Theatre Association; December 1968 – 1998	Next: Li Moran (李默然)
