= List of songs recorded by Dev =

American singer, rapper and songwriter DEV has recorded material for two studio album, three extended plays, and has been featured on several songs on other artists' respective albums. She has also recorded successful songs that have been released as non-album promotional singles, some of which have been released freely on the web.

== List ==
Key
†	Indicates single release
#	Indicates promotional single release
‡	Indicates confirmed song but never released
•	Indicates song with non-English lyrics

Song	Artist(s)	Writer(s)	Album(s)	Year
"#1"	Dev featuring Nef The Pharaoh	Dev; Lil Aaron	—N/a	2016
"2Nite" #	The Cataracs featuring Dev	The Cataracs; Dev	Songs We Sung In Showers	2009
"A1" #	Bobby Brackins featuring Dev	Bobby Brackins; Dev	Live Good 5 - The EP	2010
"Aftershock"	Max Styler featuring Dev	Max Styler; Dev	Aftershock - EP	2015
"All I Wanna Do"	Dev	Dev	I Only See You When I'm Dreamin'	2017
"Baby, We Go"	Dev	Dev	Bittersweet July	2014
"Backseat" †	New Boyz featuring Dev and The Cataracs	New Boyz; Dev; The Cataracs	Too Cool To Care	2011
"Bad Girl" (The Cataracs remix – featuring Dev)	Girls' Generation featuring The Cataracs and Dev	The Cataracs Hiro (Digz Inc.) Jörgen Elofsson Jesper Jakobson Lauren Dyson	Re:package Album "Girls' Generation" ~The Boys~	2011
"Bass Down Low" †	Dev featuring The Cataracs	Dev; The Cataracs	The Night The Sun Came Up	2010
"Booty Bounce" #	Dev	Dev; The Cataracs	—N/a	2010
"Break Ya Back" #	Timbaland featuring Dev	Timbaland; Dev	—N/a	2013
"Breathe"	Dev	Dev; The Cataracs	The Night The Sun Came Up	2011
"Bright Shiny Things"	Pace featuring Dev	Pace	Electromatic EP	2011
"Celebrate The Weekend"	Dev	Dev	Bittersweet July Pt 2	2014
"Come At Me" #	The Cataracs featuring Dev	Raye; Dev; MNDR; Sarah Hudson	I Only See You When I'm Dreamin'	2017
"Crazy Talk"	Dev	Dev	—N/a	2012
"Dancefloor" †	The Pack featuring Dev	The Pack; Dev; Young L	Wolfpack Party	2010
"Dancing Shoes"	Dev	Dev; The Cataracs	The Night The Sun Came Up	2011
"Danse" † •	Mia Martina featuring Dev	Mia Martina; Dev; Adam Alexander	Mia Martina	2013
"Darkest Days (Apocalypse 2014)"	Arno Cost & Norman Dorey featuring Dev	Arno Cost & Norman Dorey; Dev	—N/a	2014
"Don't Hurt It" •	Dev featuring Timbaland	Dev; Timbaland; The Cataracs	The Night The Sun Came Up	2012
"Don't Say That Word"	Dev	Dev; The Cataracs	—N/a	2008
"Electric Walk" †	Nytrix featuring Dev	Dev	—N/a	2015
"Everything I Do"	Dev	Dev; NanosauR	Not All Love Songs Have To Be So Sad	2014
"Everywhere"	Boi & Dev	Dev; Karlos Brown	—N/a	2015
"Feel It"	Dev	Dev	Bittersweet July	2014
"Fireball" #	Dev	Dev; The Cataracs	—N/a	2009
"Getaway"	Dev	Dev; The Cataracs	The Night The Sun Came Up	2011
"Gimmie Some"	Dev	Dev ‡	Bittersweet July Pt 2	2014
"Heatstroke"	Dev	Dev; The Cataracs	—N/a	—N/a
"Here We Are"	Dev	Dev; NanosauR	Not All Love Songs Have To Be So Sad	2014
"Hey Hey Hey (Pop Another Bottle)" †	Laurent Wéry featuring Dev and Swift K.I.D.	Laurent Wéry; Dev; K. Snelle; A.K. Jermaine	—N/a	2011
"Hey Ricky" †	NERVO featuring Kreayshawn, Dev, Alisa	NERVO; Dev; Kreayshawn; Alisa	Collateral	2015
"Honey Dip" †	Dev	Dev; The Cataracs	Bittersweet July	2014
"Hotter Than Fire" †	Eric Saade featuring Dev	Eric Saade; J-Son; Jason Gill	Saade Vol. 2	2011
"How I Want Ya"	Thames featuring Dev	Dev; Thames	—N/a	2015
"Hustle Like A Lady"	Dev	Dev	—N/a	2010
"I Just Wanna F"	David Guetta and Afrojack featuring Dev and Timbaland	The Cataracs; Nick van de Wall; Jacob Luttrell; Amy Kaup; Jessica Sarangay	Nothing But The Beat	2011
"I Like To Party (The Cataracs Remix)"	Samantha Marq featuring Dev	Samantha Marq; Dev	—N/a	2011
"I Say Hella"	Bobby Brackins featuring Dev	Bobby Brackins; Dev	—N/a	2009
"In Depth Perception"	Jamie's Elsewhere featuring Dev	Jamie's Elsewhere	Rebel-Revive	2014
"In My Trunk" #	Dev featuring 2 Chainz	Dev; The Cataracs; 2 Chainz	The Night The Sun Came Up	2012
"In The Dark" †	Dev	Dev; The Cataracs	The Night The Sun Came Up	2011
"It Goes (The Whistle Song)"	Time Takers featuring Dev & Tinchy Stryder	Time Takers; Dev; Tinchy Stryder	—N/a	2011
"Leave Me Alone"	Dev	Dev	—N/a	2013
"Just Another Day"	Dev	Dev; The Cataracs	—N/a	2009
"Just In Time (4 Summertime)"	Marty James featuring Dev	Marty James; Dev	—N/a	2011
"Kalifornia Look Good"	Ya Boy featuring Dev	Ya Boy featuring Dev	Kalifornia Konvict Mixtape	2011
"Kids"	Dev	Dev	Bittersweet July	2014
"Killer"	Dev	The Cataracs	The Night The Sun Came Up	2011
"Kiss It" †	Dev featuring Sage the Gemini	Dev; Sage the Gemini	—N/a	2013
"Kiss My Lips"	Dev featuring Fabolous	Dev; The Cataracs; Fabolous	The Night The Sun Came Up	2012
"Knockin'"	Travis Barker featuring Dev, Snoop Dogg, Ludacris & E-40	Dev; Snoop Dogg; Ludacris; E-40	Give The Drummer Some	2011
"Late Night"	Dev	Dev; NanosauR	Not All Love Songs Have To Be So Sad	2014
"Lightspeed" #	Dev	Dev; The Cataracs	The Night The Sun Came Up	2011
"Like A G6" †	Far East Movement featuring Dev	Dev; The Cataracs; Far East Movement	Free Wired	2010
"Love Letter" †	Shwayze featuring Dev and The Cataracs	Shwayze; Dev; The Cataracs	Love Stoned Mixtape	2011
"Lowkey" †	Dev	Dev; NanosauR; Lil Aaron	—N/a	2016
"Lying Next To Me"	Dev	Dev; The Cataracs	—N/a	2011
"Make The Wall Sweat"	Jai'ded Jordan featuring The Cataracs & Dev	Jai'ded Jordan featuring The Cataracs & Dev	—N/a	2010
"Maria"	NanosauR featuring Dev	Dev; NanosauR	—N/a	2010
"Mary"	2AM Club featuring Dev	Dev; 2AM Club	Moon Tower	2012
"Me"	Dev	Dev; The Cataracs	The Night The Sun Came Up	2010
"Mobbin" #	Bobby Brackins featuring Dev	Bobby Brackins; Dev	—N/a	2011
"Monster"	Dev	Dev; The Cataracs	—N/a	2010
"Mr. Lover"	DJ Carnage featuring Killagraham & Dev	DJ Carnage; Dev	—N/a	2013
"Naked" †	Dev & Enrique Iglesias	Dev; The Cataracs; Enrique Iglesias	The Night The Sun Came Up	2011
"Paradise"	Rich Boy featuring Lil Hick & Dev	Rich Boy; Lil Hick	—N/a	2015
"Parade" †	Dev	Dev	Bittersweet July Pt 2	2015
"Perfect Match"	Dev	Dev; The Cataracs	The Night The Sun Came Up	2011
"Play It On The Radio"	Aaron Smith featuring The Cataracs & Dev	Aaron Smith; The Cataracs; Dev	—N/a	2010
"Polka Dots"	The Cataracs featuring Dev	Dev; The Cataracs	Lingerie EP	2008
"Real Girls"	Nostalgix featuring Dev		Star City EP	2024
"Ring My Bell"	Donnis featuring Dev	Donnis; Dev	—N/a	2011
"Serpentine (Remix)"	Spadez featuring Campa & Dev	The Cataracs	The Produce Section	2015
"Sex On The Beach"	The Pack featuring Dev	Dev; The Cataracs	Wolfpack Party	2010
"Shadows"	Dev	Dev; The Cataracs	The Night The Sun Came Up	2011
"She Makes Me Wanna" †	JLS featuring Dev	JLS; BeatGeek; Jimmy Joker; Teddy Sky	Jukebox	2011
"Stay Awake"	Dev	Dev; The Cataracs	—N/a	—N/a
"Sunrise" †	The Cataracs featuring Dev	Dev; The Cataracs	—N/a	2011
"Take Her From You" #	Dev	Dev; The Cataracs	The Night The Sun Came Up	2011
"Talking Hundreds"	Jeremy Green featuring Dev and Fatman Scoop	Dev; Fatman Scoop	—N/a	2013
"Thank You"	The Cataracs featuring Dev	Dev; The Cataracs	—N/a	2012
"That Lean"	Borgore featuring Dev and Carnage	Dev; Borgore; Carnage	Legend	2013
"The Gun"	Cash Cash featuring Trinidad James, Dev & Chrish	Cash Cash; Dev; Trinidad James	Blood, Sweat & 3 Years	2016
"The Night Is Young"	Dev	Dev	Bittersweet July Pt 2	2014
"The One (Part Of Me)"	Dev	Katy Perry	Not All Love Songs Have To Be So Sad	2014
"Top Of The World" †	Dev	Dev; The Cataracs	—N/a	2011
"Turn The World On" †	Static Revenger featuring Dev	Static Revenger	—N/a	2012
"We Came To Smash (In a Black Tuxedo)"	Martin Solveig featuring Dev	Dev; Martin Solveig; Julien Jabre	Smash	2011
"We Rock It" †	Sander Kleinenberg featuring Dev	Dev; The Cataracs	—N/a	2016
"Who Needs A Heart"	Dev	Dev	Bittersweet July	2014
"Who's That Boy"	Demi Lovato featuring Dev	Dev; Ryan Tedder; Noel Zancanella	Unbroken	2011
"You Want Me"	Dev	Dev	Bittersweet July Pt 2	2014
"Your Favorite"	T. Mills featuring Dev	Dev; T. Mills	Ready, Fire, Aim!	2010
