= The Cataracs production discography =

A chronological listing of songs produced by The Cataracs.

== 2010 ==
- Snoop Dogg - "Wet" (Doggumentary)
- Far East Movement - "Like a G6" (Free Wired)
- New Boyz - "Backseat" (Too Cool to Care)
- Hyper Crush - "Kick Us Out"
- Dev - "Fireball"
- Dev - "Booty Bounce"
- Glasses Malone - "I Get Doe" (Beach Cruiser)
- The Pack - Wolfpack Party

- "Wolfpack Party"
- "Sex on the Beach"
- "Aye!"
- "Booty Bounce"

== 2011 ==
- Dev - The Night the Sun Came Up

- "Getaway"
- "Kiss My Lips"
- "Me"
- "Breathe"
- "Lightspeed"
- "Shadows"
- "Perfect Match"
- "In My Trunk"
- "Take Her From You"
- "Dancing Shoes"
- "Bass Down Low"
- "In The Dark"
- "Killer"

- Shwayze - "Love Letter" (Love Stoned)
- New Boyz - "Better with the Lights Off" (Too Cool to Care)
- 50 Cent - "I'm On It"
- Mistah F.A.B. - "City Nights"
- Dev & Enrique Iglesias - "Naked"
- The Cataracs - "Top of the World" (featuring Dev)

== 2012 ==
- The Cataracs - "All You" (featuring Waka Flocka Flame and Kaskade)

== 2013 ==
- Selena Gomez - Stars Dance

- "Slow Down"
- "Undercover"

- Sean Paul - "Other Side of Love"
- Enrique Iglesias - "Turn the Night Up"
- Robin Thicke - Blurred Lines

- "Pressure"
- "Put Your Lovin' on Me"

- The Cataracs - "Hey Now" (with Martin Solveig featuring Kyle)
