= Dev discography =

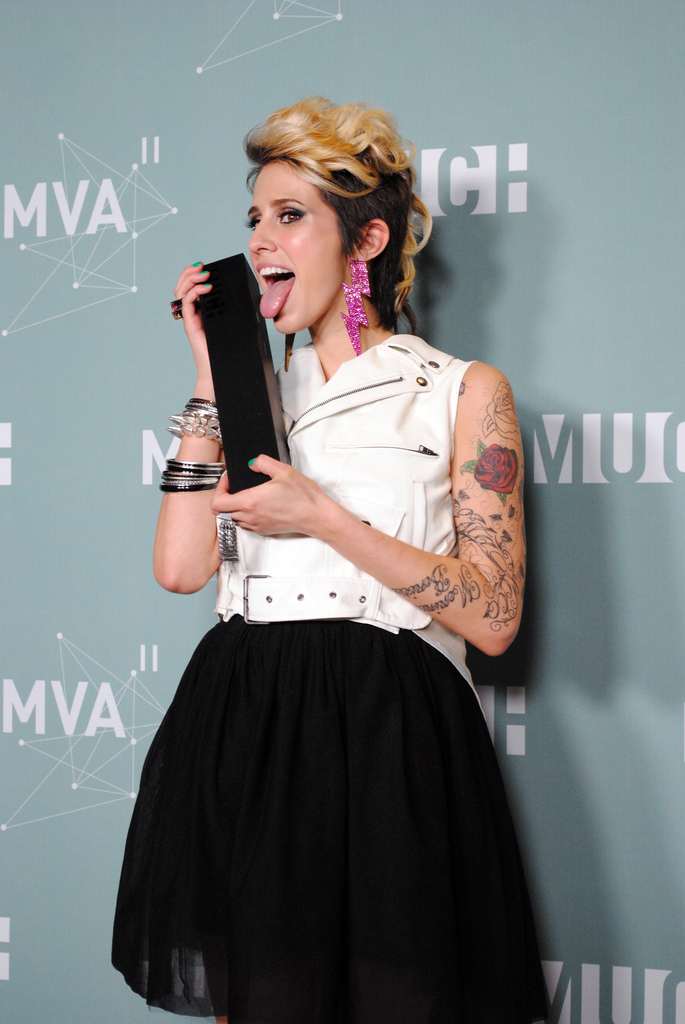
- Dev at the 2011 MuchMusic Video Awards
- Studio albums: 2
- Singles: 14
- Music videos: 17
- EPs: 3

The discography of American singer Dev consists of two studio albums, one mixtape, three extended plays (one as a split EP), nine singles as a solo artist, as well as 12 as a featured artist. Dev was signed to Universal Republic, under which she released her debut single, "Bass Down Low" featuring The Cataracs, on December 6, 2010, later becoming part of her debut studio album The Night the Sun Came Up released in 2011, along with the hit-single "In the Dark" and the duet with Enrique Iglesias: "Naked". Dev has also released two EPs, Bittersweet July and the following second part in 2014. Both projects include the singles "Honey Dip" and "Parade".

In 2016, Dev released "Lowkey" and "#1" featuring Nef the Pharaoh, the latter peaked at 15 on the Billboard Rhythmic chart.

In 2017, Dev released her second studio album, I Only See You When I'm Dreamin', on September 8. It includes "All I Wanna Do", "Trouble", "Drunk Texting" and "Come at Me".

== Albums ==
=== Studio albums ===
Album title	Album details	Peak chart positions			
Album title	Album details	US	US D/E	CAN	UK
The Night the Sun Came Up	Released: August 31, 2011; Label: Universal Republic; Formats: CD, digital download	61	6	67	136
I Only See You When I'm Dreamin'	Released: September 8, 2017; Label: Independent; Formats: CD, digital download	—	—	—	—

=== Mixtapes ===
- Is Hot: The Mixtape (2011)

== Extended plays ==
Title	Details	Peak chart positions
Title	Details	US D/E
Not All Love Songs Have to Be So Sad (with NanosauR)	Released: July 31, 2014; Label: Rica Lyfe; Format: Digital download	—
Bittersweet July	Released: September 23, 2014; Label: Rica Lyfe; Format: Digital download	16
Bittersweet July, Pt. 2	Released: December 15, 2014; Label: Rica Lyfe; Format: Digital download	—

== Singles ==
=== As lead artist ===
List of singles as lead artist, with selected chart positions and certifications, showing year released and album name
Title	Year	Peak chart positions								Certifications	Album
Title	Year	US	US Dance	US Rhy.	AUS	CAN	DEN	IRL	UK	Certifications	Album
"Bass Down Low" (featuring The Cataracs)	2010	61	—	24	66	35	—	28	10	BPI: Silver	The Night the Sun Came Up
"In the Dark"	2011	11	1	2	41	13	22	33	37	RIAA: Platinum	The Night the Sun Came Up
"Naked" (with Enrique Iglesias)	2011	99	2	30	—	54	26	—	—		The Night the Sun Came Up
"In My Trunk" (featuring 2 Chainz)	2012	—	—	—	—	—	—	—	—		The Night the Sun Came Up
"Kiss It" (featuring Sage the Gemini)	2013	— (Note: "Kiss It" did not enter the Billboard Hot 100, but peaked at number 10 on the Bubbling Under Hot 100 Singles chart, which acts as an extension to the Hot 100.)	—	34	—	—	—	—	—		Non-album single
"Honey Dip"	2014	—	—	—	—	—	—	—	—		Bittersweet July
"Parade"	2015	—	—	—	—	—	—	—	—		Bittersweet July, Pt. 2
"#1" (featuring Nef the Pharaoh)	2016	—	—	15	—	—	—	—	—		Non-album single
"All I Wanna Do"	2017	—	—	—	—	—	—	—	—		I Only See You When I'm Dreamin'
"Come at Me"	2017	—	—	—	—	—	—	—	—		I Only See You When I'm Dreamin'
"Mango"	2020	—	—	—	—	—	—	—	—		Non-album singles
"Follow My Lead"	2020	—	—	—	—	—	—	—	—		Non-album singles
"Bom Dia"	2020	—	—	—	—	—	—	—	—		Non-album singles
"Menina Bonita"	2021	—	—	—	—	—	—	—	—		Non-album singles
"Y COMO YO"	2022	—	—	—	—	—	—	—	—		Non-album singles
"MAMI PAPI"	2022	—	—	—	—	—	—	—	—		Non-album singles
"Summer"	2023	—	—	—	—	—	—	—	—		Non-album singles
"Discoteca" (with Ape Drums featuring NEZ)	2023	—	—	—	—	—	—	—	—		Non-album singles
"Tilt"	2024	—	—	—	—	—	—	—	—		Non-album singles
"IRLI"	2024	—	—	—	—	—	—	—	—		Non-album singles
"Make Ya Body Whistle" (with The Cataracs)	2025	—	—	—	—	—	—	—	—		Non-album singles
"Big Bossy"	2025	—	—	—	—	—	—	—	—		Non-album singles
"Sleaze On It" (with Mel 4Ever)	2025	—	—	—	—	—	—	—	—		Non-album singles
"REDLINE" (with Ogryzek)	2025	—	—	—	—	—	—	—	—		Non-album singles
"Freaks" (with 6arelyhuman)	2025	—	—	—	—	—	—	—	—		Non-album singles
"Lie Forever" (with sennoh)	2025	—	—	—	—	—	—	—	—		Non-album singles
"Oops Oh Well"	2025	—	—	—	—	—	—	—	—		Non-album singles
"Don't Play"	2026	—	—	—	—	—	—	—	—		Non-album singles
"T.A.S.T.E." (with nikko)	2026	—	—	—	—	—	—	—	—		Non-album singles
"—" denotes a recording that did not chart or was not released in that territory.

=== As featured artist ===
List of singles as lead artist, with selected chart positions and certifications, showing year released and album name
Title	Year	Peak chart positions										Certifications	Album
Title	Year	US	US Dance	AUS	FRA	CAN	IRL	NZ	SWE	SWI	UK	Certifications	Album
"Like a G6" (Far East Movement featuring The Cataracs and Dev)	2010	1	3	2	14	3	12	1	7	10	5	RIAA: 4× Platinum; ARIA: 3× Platinum; BEA: Gold; BPI: Platinum; GLF: Gold; IFPI SWI: Gold; RMNZ: Platinum	Free Wired
"Backseat" (New Boyz featuring The Cataracs and Dev)	2011	26	—	89	91	52	—	28	—	—	55	RIAA: Platinum	Too Cool to Care
"Top of the World" (The Cataracs featuring Dev)	2011	—	—	—	66	61	—	—	—	—	—	RIAA: Gold	Non-album single
"She Makes Me Wanna" (JLS featuring Dev)	2011	—	25	—	—	—	2	—	—	—	1	BPI: Platinum	Jukebox
"Hey Hey Hey (Pop Another Bottle)" (Laurent Wéry featuring Swift K.I.D. and Dev)	2011	—	14	2	—	—	47	29	—	63	—	ARIA: 3× Platinum	Non-album single
"Hotter Than Fire" (Eric Saade featuring Dev)	2011	—	—	—	—	—	—	—	5	—	—		Saade Vol. 2
"Sunrise" (The Cataracs featuring Dev)	2011	—	—	—	—	—	—	—	—	—	—		Non-album singles
"Turn the World On" (Static Revenger featuring Dev)	2012	—	—	—	—	—	—	—	—	—	—		Non-album singles
"Mary" (2AM Club featuring Big Sean and Dev)	2012	—	—	—	—	—	—	—	—	—	—		Moon Tower (EP)
"Danse" (Mia Martina featuring Dev)	2013	—	35	—	—	29	—	—	—	—	94	MC: Gold	Mia Martina
"Hey Ricky" (Nervo featuring Kreayshawn, Dev and Alisa Ueno)	2015	—	—	—	—	—	—	—	—	—	—		Collateral
"Electric Walk" (Nytrix featuring Dev)	2015	—	8	—	—	—	—	—	—	—	—		Non-album singles
"We Rock It" (Sander Kleinenberg featuring Dev)	2016	—	—	—	—	—	—	—	—	—	—		Non-album singles
"Everything" (Wreckno & Super Future featuring Dev)	2022	—	—	—	—	—	—	—	—	—	—		Non-album singles
"Bass Down Low (Go Version)" (KSHMR, Bassjackers & Avancada featuring Dev)	2025	—	—	—	—	—	—	—	—	—	—		Non-album singles
"—" denotes a recording that did not chart or was not released in that territory.

=== Promotional singles ===
- "Fireball" (2009)
- "Booty Bounce" (2010)
- "Lightspeed" (2011)
- "Take Her from You" (2012)
- "Kids" (2014)
- "The Night Is Young" (2014)
- "Drunk Texting" (2017)
- "Trouble" (2017)
- "Down For Me" (2018)
- "Rock On It" (2018)
- "Girls Don't Lie" (2018)
- "Clean Break" (2018)

== Guest appearances ==
List of non-single guest appearances, with other performing artists, showing year released and album name
Title	Year	Album
"2nite" (The Cataracs featuring Dev)	2009	Songs We Sung in Showers
"Dancefloor" (The Pack featuring Dev)	2010	Wolfpack Party
"Sex on the Beach" (The Pack featuring Dev)	2010	Wolfpack Party
"Your Favorite" (T. Mills featuring Dev)	2010	Ready, Fire, Aim!
"Mobbin" (Bobby Brackins featuring Dev)	2010	Non-album single
"Knockin" (Travis Barker featuring Snoop Dogg, Ludacris, E-40 & Dev)	2011	Give the Drummer Some
"A1" (Bobby Brackins featuring Dev)	2011	Live Good .5 - EP
"Love Letter" (Shwayze featuring The Cataracs & Dev)	2011	Love Stoned Mixtape
"We Came to Smash (In a Black Tuxedo)" (Martin Solveig featuring Dev)	2011	Smash
"I Just Wanna F" (David Guetta & Afrojack featuring Timbaland & Dev)	2011	Nothing but the Beat
"Bright Shiny Things" (Pace featuring Dev)	2011	Electromatic - EP
"Who's That Boy" (Demi Lovato featuring Dev)	2011	Unbroken
"Bad Girl" (The Cataracs Remix) (Girls' Generation featuring Dev)	2011	Girls' Generation (Repackaged Edition)
"Kiss My Lips (Remix)" (Borgore & Dev)	2012	Flex - EP
"Break Ya Back" (Timbaland featuring Dev)	2012	Non-album single
"Talking 100s" (Spadez featuring Fatman Scoop & Dev)	2012	The Produce Section
"That Lean" (Borgore featuring Carnage & Dev)	2013	Legend - EP
"In Depth Perception" (Jamie's Elsewhere featuring Dev)	2014	Rebel-Revive
"Darkest Days (Apocalypse 2014)" (Arno Cost & Norman Doray featuring Dev)	2014	Non-album single
"How I Want Ya" (Thames featuring Dev)	2015	Non-album single
"Serpentine" (Spadez featuring Campa & Dev)	2015	The Produce Section
"Aftershock" (Max Styler featuring Dev)	2015	Aftershock - EP
"The Gun" (Cash Cash featuring Trinidad James, Dev & Chrish)	2016	Blood, Sweat and 3 Years
"Secrets" (Nanosaur featuring Dev)	2018	Text Me Records: Group Chat - A Back to School Mixtape
"Make Out" (Da Candy, Ferry & Dev)	2019	Non-album single
"HIM (HER Remix)" (Myles Parrish, NyNy & Dev)	2022	Non-album single
"Are U Feelin Me" (Knock2 & Dev)	2023	ROOM202 - EP
"Real Girls" (Nostalgix & Dev)	2024	STAR CITY - EP
"Wild One" (MitiS & Dev)	2024	Unity
"Deep End" (Rommii, Dev & Cal-A)	2024	Non-album single
"Plans" (Wreckno & Dev)	2024	Party Girl - EP
"Kick Bass In Your Face" (Basswell featuring Dev)	2024	Non-album single

== Music videos ==
=== As lead artist ===
List of music videos as lead artist, showing year released and directors
Title	Year	Director(s)
"Fireball"	2009	Colin Tilley
"Booty Bounce"	2010	Ethan Lader
"Bass Down Low" (featuring The Cataracs)	2010	Ethan Lader
"In the Dark"	2011	Ethan Lader
"Lightspeed"	2011	Indie-Pop
"Dancing Shoes"	2012	Mickey Finnegan
"Take Her from You"	2012	David Button
"Kiss My Lips"	2012	High5Collective
"Naked" (with Enrique Iglesias)	2012	BB Gun
"Me"	2012	Chris Mulhern
"Kiss It" (featuring Sage the Gemini)	2014	Corey Nickols
"Honey Dip"	2014	Kreayshawn
"Parade"	2015	Aris Jerome
"Lowkey"	2016	Troy Huizar
"#1" (featuring Nef the Pharaoh) (released but later on removed)	2017	Gino Suvino-Vinatieri
"All I Wanna Do"	2017	Gino Suvino-Vinatieri
"Come At Me"	2018	Gino Suvino-Vinatieri

=== As featured artist ===
List of music videos as featured artist, showing year released and directors
Title	Year	Director(s)
"Like a G6" (Far East Movement featuring The Cataracs & Dev)	2010	Matt Alonzo
"Dancefloor" (The Pack featuring Dev)	2010	Aris Jerome
"Mobbin" (Bobby Brackins featuring Dev)	2010	Jonathan Singer-Vine
"Backseat" (New Boyz featuring The Cataracs & Dev)	2011	Jake Davis
"Top of the World" (The Cataracs featuring Dev)	2011	Ethan Lader
"A1" (Bobby Brackins featuring Dev)	2011	Unknown
"Love Letter" (Shwayze featuring The Cataracs & Dev)	2011	Mikey Easterling
"She Makes Me Wanna" (JLS featuring Dev)	2011	Colin Tilley
"Hey Hey Hey (Pop Another Bottle)" (Laurent Wery featuring Swift K.I.D. & Dev)	2011	Unknown
"Sunrise" (The Cataracs featuring Dev)	2011	Anthony Fox; Jonathan Singer-Vine
"Hotter Than Fire" (Eric Saade featuring Dev)	2011	Unknown
"Turn the World On" (Static Revenger featuring Dev)	2012	Unknown
"Danse" (Mia Martina featuring Dev)	2013	Michael Maxxis
"Hey Ricky" (NERVO featuring Kreayshawn & Dev)	2015	Kreayshawn
"We Rock It" (Sander Kleinenberg featuring Dev)	2016	Micah Hamilton
"Electric Walk (Blasterjaxx Remix)" (Nytrix featuring Dev)	2016	Nytrix
"Everything" (Wreckno & Super Future featuring Dev)	2022	Jon Humphrey

=== Guest appearances ===
List of music videos as guest appearances, showing year released, artists and directors
Title	Year	Artist(s)	Director(s)
"Freakin' Ta Ma Song"	2009	The Cataracs	Colin Tilley
"Club Love"	2009	The Cataracs	Colin Tilley
"West Like"	2021	Destiny Rogers	Zhamak Fullad
