= In the Dark (Dev song) =

2011 single by Dev

Single by Dev

from the album The Night the Sun Came Up
- Released: April 25, 2011
- Recorded: January 2011
- Studio: The Indie-Pop Sweat Shop
- Genre: Dance-pop; house; Eurodance
- Length: 3:46
- Label: Universal Motown
- Songwriters: Devin Tailes; Niles Hollowell-Dhar; David Singer-Vine
- Producer: The Cataracs

Dev singles chronology
"Top of the World" (2011)	"In the Dark" (2011)	"She Makes Me Wanna" (2011)

Music video
- "In the Dark" on YouTube

"In the Dark" is a song performed by American singer Dev. It was written by Dev alongside the Cataracs, who produced it for Dev's debut studio album, The Night the Sun Came Up (2011). The song was released as the album's second single on April 25, 2011, through Universal Motown. "In the Dark" came about when Dev wanted to make a sexy song to show that she is a grown woman. She collaborated with American rapper Flo Rida on an official remix as she believed she would enjoy the remix when hearing it on the radio. "In the Dark" is a dance-pop song with a saxophone hook and influences of Eurodance, Latin and jazz music. The lyrics emphasize sex drives and letting the sensation of touch fully take over from sight.

The song received generally positive reviews from music critics, who highlighted its production and the saxophone line. However, critics were divided regarding the song's lyrical content; some referred it to as sexy, while others dismissed its metaphors. "In the Dark" enjoyed commercial success in the United States, peaking at number 11 on the Billboard Hot 100 chart and the summit of Hot Dance Club Songs. The song achieved its highest national peak in Russia and Slovakia, where it reached number one. Elsewhere, the song peaked in the top forty in Canada, Australia, Denmark, Ireland, Scotland and the United Kingdom. The song's music video features shots of black-painted hands that touch Dev while she is standing naked. According to Dev, the inspiration behind the video was to reflect the "dark" themes of the song, by creating a Tim Burton-inspired feel.

== Background ==
"In the Dark" was written by Dev alongside the Cataracs, a group that consists of Niles Hollowell-Dhar and David Singer-Vine, who also produced the track. Dev described the song as "very flavorful" and "hot". In an interview with music blog Idolator, she talked in-depth about the conception of the song, stating, "I was like, dammit, I'm gonna make a sexy song!" She explained that she wanted the song to be "tasteful, yet sexual" and described it as "very sexy, but very musical at the same time". She said, "The songs I had before, even though they were explicit to an extent, they were just fun. It was time when we just wanted to make that sort of record, and we did. It's probably one of the sexier songs on the record, but I think it needed that!" "In the Dark" was recorded during a session in January 2011; it was one of the first songs to be recorded for Dev's debut album and it was eventually also recorded by Demi Lovato. It was later mixed by Manny Marroquin at Larrabee Studios in Los Angeles, California and mastered by Tom Coyne at Sterling Sound in New York City.

The song was released on April 25, 2011, via digital download as the second single from Dev's debut studio album, The Night the Sun Came Up. It was later sent for rhythmic airplay in the United States on May 24, 2011, followed by an add on mainstream radio stations on June 21, 2011. In the United Kingdom, "In the Dark" was released in a digital extended play (EP) alongside three remixes of the track as well as its music video. Rapper Flo Rida is featured on an official remix of the song, and Dev stated that she wanted to make a remix as it would be refreshing and "great for radio". She explained that a rapper would suit the song well and that she would enjoy the remix when hearing it on the radio. She elaborated on choosing Flo Rida, saying: "We went in thinking about who would be cool on the radio [...] Flo Rida fit, and he completely killed it." 50 Cent is featured on another remix of the track, which he recorded at Sonic Vista Studios Ibiza (Spain) in August 2011, while Kanye West appears on an unofficial remix, of which Dev said: "That was just kind of something that floated onto the Internet and the airwaves, which I don't mind at all because it sounds absolutely amazing and it's one of my favorite remixes too."

== Composition ==
"In the Dark" (2011)
A sample of "In the Dark", featuring the saxophone riff accompanied by the "ooh la la" hook, alongside Eurodance and Latin musical influences.

"In the Dark" is a dance-pop song that features Eurodance beats and synths, mixed with influences of Latin music. The song features a house rhythm and a prominent saxophone riff that serves as the song's instrumentation. Critics compared the riff to "Mr. Saxobeat" (2011) by Romanian singer Alexandra Stan. "In the Dark" opens with Dev's sing-talk vocal style as she sings "On my waist, through my hair / Think about it when you touch me there / Close my eyes, here you are dance-dance-dancing in the dark." According to Nadine Cheung of AOL Radio, the line borrows the melody from Reel 2 Real's "I Like to Move It" (1994). "In the Dark" sees Dev using her singing voice more than her distinctive sing-talk style. Lyrically, the song speaks of sex drives and letting sensation of touch fully taking over from sight, as Dev repeats the line, "I got a sex drive that's push to start". According to sheet music published at Musicnotes.com by Hal Leonard Corporation, "In the Dark" is written in the time signature of common time and set in a fast tempo of 125 beats per minute. It is written in the key of C minor and Dev's vocals span from the note of A♭_{4} to the note of B_{5}. It has a basic sequence of Cm–E♭_{6}–A♭_{5}–G_{5} as its chord progression.

== Critical reception ==
"In the Dark" received generally positive reviews from music critics. Lewis Corner of British music website Digital Spy rated it four stars out of five, particularly praising the saxophone hook. Corner commented, "[Dev] purrs in her sensual and sultry tones, accompanied by that saxophone hook spicier than an extra-hot peri peri chicken from Nandos – and, we should add, just as lip-lickingly addictive." Bill Lamb of About.com rated "In the Dark" four stars out of five and praised Dev's vocals, as well as the song's sexy lyrics and the saxophone hook. Lamb observed that the song is "nearly pure libido", but said that it works well without explicit lyrics. On the other hand, he criticized the song for being "locked in the current time", writing: "'In the Dark' seems very much a song of the dance pop moment. Like the hit 'Like a G6,' it is quite possible in a few months 'In the Dark' may sound a bit dated. It does not seem to capture something timeless." Lamb ended on a positive note; however, writing that the song is a worthy addition to party playlists and praised Dev and the Cataracs for "hav[ing] their fingers on the pulse of current party music". Garyn Ganz of Rolling Stone graded the song three stars out of five and commented: "Dev speak-sings about her sex drive over a Nineties Latin house beat like a top-shelf version of Kesha – seductive, not sleazy."

While reviewing The Night the Sun Came Up, Slant Magazine critic Sal Cinquemani named the song the album's best track. He pointed out that, unlike the rest of the album, "In the Dark" avoids "too-aggressive beats and chintzy synths" and instead relies on Dev's "ooh la la" hook and the "sleek" saxophone line. Cinquemani concluded by writing that the song is "almost enough to forgive [the Cataracs] for 'Like a G6'." Tris McCall of The Star-Ledger named "In the Dark" the "Song of the Week" and compared its saxophone line to Alexandra Stan's "Mr. Saxobeat", and said that while the latter is "total Euroschlock", "In the Dark" preserves "some of the mechanized detachment" of Dev's song "Booty Bounce" (2010). McCall was mixed regarding "In the Dark"'s lyrical content and called the line "do your work on me/Open up my body and do some surgery" the "grossest pillow talk" since the Black Eyed Peas' "My Humps". Writing for the Dallas Observer, Shahryar Rizvi was negative in his review of the song and criticized the "cheesy" saxophone sound, saying that it "serves well to show just how mediocre this song is". LA Weekly writer Shea Serrano regarded the song as "predictable" and dismissed the metaphors, labeling them "confusing".

=== Recognition ===
Music magazine Spin included "In the Dark" at number 15 on its "Favorite Pop Tracks of 2011" list, naming it "radio gold". The Hollywood Reporter's music editor Shirley Halperin put it at number four on her "Top 10 Singles of 2011" list and called it "irresistible". Halperin went on to comment: "Spotlighting the sexiest sax solo this side of Duran Duran's 'Rio' and a sultry, almost Latin-flavored vibe, it may or may not be an ode to masturbation, but it definitely satisfies in all the right places."

In 2021, "In the Dark" entered various international music charts due to going viral on the video-sharing app TikTok.

== Chart performance ==
In the United States, "In the Dark" made its debut at number 92 on the Billboard Hot 100 chart in the issue dated August 20, 2011, almost three months after the song's release in April. The song steadily ascended on the chart for eight weeks before reaching its peak position of number 11 in the issue dated October 22, 2011. The song proved to be a bigger commercial success than Dev's debut single, "Bass Down Low" (2010), which reached number 61. Additionally, "In the Dark" reached number one on two of Billboard's component charts, Heatseekers Songs and Hot Dance Club Songs. The song also peaked at number eight on both Pop Songs and Radio Songs. On March 8, 2012, the single was certified platinum by the Recording Industry Association of America (RIAA) for sales of over one million units.

In Canada, "In the Dark" debuted at number 83 on the Canadian Hot 100 chart in the issue dated September 17, 2011 and peaked at number 15 six weeks later on October 22, 2011. In Australia, the song debuted at number 64 on the singles chart, and eventually peaked at number 41. Across Europe, "In the Dark" made its first appearance on the Tracklisten chart in Denmark on July 29, 2011, entering at number 36. The following week, the song reached its peak of number 22 and was listed on the chart for five weeks before falling off. In Slovakia, "In the Dark" debuted at number 30 and peaked at the top position seven weeks later. In the United Kingdom, the song debuted and peaked at number 37 on the UK Singles Chart in the issue dated August 27, 2011. Although failing to match "Bass Down Low"'s peak of number ten, it did give Dev her second top 40 single in the UK. In Ireland, "In the Dark" fared similarly to the UK on the Irish Singles Chart, entering and peaking at number 33.

== Music video ==
In the music video for "In the Dark", Dev is standing naked while being surrounded and touched by black-painted hands and arms

The music video for "In the Dark" was directed by Ethan Lader, whom Dev enlisted to make the video as he regularly makes videos for her and the Cataracs. Lader originally contacted her with ideas for the clip, and she soon replied with what she would want in the video. She said, "So we did that back and forth, which he always does with me until I get my point across. ... and then we met up and we got both of our ideas and feelings across. I wanted to be sexy and dark like the song is, in a really interesting way, and we pulled it off, I think." The video was filmed in Los Angeles, California in late-April 2011, just before Dev joined Usher as the opening act for his OMG Tour. Dev took more control over the "In the Dark" video than previous video shoots as she used to let the director "take a little bit of control" when she was inexperienced in the process. In an interview with Idolator, Dev elaborated on the video's concept, stating that she wanted a dark feel similar to Tim Burton's Alice in Wonderland: "I wanted the video to be sexy as well [...] we'd have an Alice in Wonderland/Tim Burton type of feel."

In the video, Dev is seen in a club scene with intense dancing. The main focus is black-painted hands and arms, which are prominent in several shots of Dev as she is standing naked while the hands are touching her body. Some of the hands were digitally added, but most of them were real, including the ones touching Dev. She explained, "The extras were amazing, they let me paint their hands and bodies, and they stacked on top of each other and did that for hours. For takes and takes and takes." The video also includes shots of an albino ball python and a tarantula. Cory Lamz of Westword wrote a positive review of the video: "Watching 'In the Dark' is like dancing under a strobe light on ecstasy. In a sea of hands, literally, Dev manages to tease you, seduce you and entice you. She makes you want to touch her, just like every other hand in the video." Contessa Gayles of AOL Music referred the video to as "freaky" and "funky", writing "Forget 'dancing in the dark,' Dev works it in a sea of dismembered, black-painted hands and arms in this freaky, funky new vid." In contrast, Becky Bain of Idolator called it "somewhat unsettling". Bill Lamb of About.com wrote that the video "will likely leave you never looking at hands exactly the same".

== Track listings ==
- Digital download
1. "In the Dark" – 3:48
- Digital EP
1. "In the Dark" (Radio Edit) – 3:30
2. "In the Dark" (featuring Flo Rida) – 3:40
3. "In the Dark" (Proper Villains Remix) – 4:26
4. "In the Dark" (Havana Brown Remix) – 5:33
5. "In the Dark" (Music video) – 3:46
- Remix download
1. "In the Dark" (featuring Flo Rida) – 3:39
- Remix EP
1. "In the Dark" (Proper Villains Remix) – 4:27
2. "In the Dark" (Hype Jones 2012 Remix) – 4:33
3. "In the Dark" (DJ Havoc & SpekrFreks Remix) – 3:28
4. "In the Dark" (Static Revenger Remix) – 6:26
5. "In the Dark" (Johan Wedel Remix) – 6:30
6. "In the Dark" (Benzi & DStar Remix) – 4:42
7. "In the Dark" (DJ Vice Remix) – 6:30
8. "In the Dark" (DJ Kue Remix) – 6:52
9. "In the Dark" (DJ Enferno Remix) – 6:08
10. "In the Dark" (Ranidu Remix) – 5:38
11. "In the Dark" (Alfa Paare Remix) – 5:17

== Credits and personnel ==
Recording

- Recorded at The Indie-Pop Sweat Shop

Personnel

- Songwriting – Devin Tailes, Niles Hollowell-Dhar, David Singer-Vine
- Production – Niles Hollowell-Dhar
- Recording – The Cataracs
- Mixing – Manny Marroquin
- Mastering – Tom Coyne

Credits adapted from The Night the Sun Came Up liner notes.

== Charts ==
=== Weekly charts ===
Chart (2011–2012)	Peak position
Australia (ARIA)	41
Belgium (Ultratip Bubbling Under Flanders)	56
Brazil (Billboard Hot 100)	7
Canada (Canadian Hot 100)	13
CIS Airplay (TopHit)	2
Czech Republic Airplay (ČNS IFPI)	44
Denmark (Tracklisten)	22
Ireland (IRMA)	33
Mexico Anglo (Monitor Latino)	6
Poland (Polish Airplay New)	4
Romania (Romanian Top 100)	67
Russia Airplay (TopHit)	1
Scotland Singles (OCC)	36
Slovakia Airplay (ČNS IFPI)	1
UK Singles (OCC)	37
Ukraine Airplay (TopHit)	16
US Billboard Hot 100	11
US Dance/Mix Show Airplay (Billboard)	2
US Dance Club Songs (Billboard)	1
US Latin Pop Airplay (Billboard)	17
US Pop Airplay (Billboard)	8
US Rhythmic Airplay (Billboard)	2

=== Year-end charts ===
2011 year-end chart performance for "In the Dark"
Chart (2011)	Position
Brazil (Crowley)	62
Canadian Hot 100	86
Russia Airplay (TopHit)	58
US Billboard Hot 100	83
US Hot Dance Club Songs	24
US Dance/Mix Show Airplay	24
US Pop Songs	48
US Rhythmic	21

2012 year-end chart performance for "In the Dark"
Chart (2012)	Position
Brazil (Crowley)	75
Russia Airplay (TopHit)	56

2013 year-end chart performance for "In the Dark"
Chart (2013)	Position
Russia Airplay (TopHit)	190

== Certifications ==
Region	Certification	Certified units/sales
United States (RIAA)	Platinum	1,000,000^{*}
^{*} Sales figures based on certification alone.

== Radio add dates and release history ==
Country	Release date	Format(s)
Australia	April 25, 2011	Digital download
Denmark	April 25, 2011	Digital download
United States	April 26, 2011	Digital download
United States	May 24, 2011	Rhythmic radio
United States	August 9, 2011	Mainstream radio
Germany	July 22, 2011	Digital download
Ireland	August 12, 2011	Digital EP
United Kingdom	August 12, 2011	Digital EP
United States	August 29, 2011	Remix download
United States	December 13, 2011	Remix EP

== See also ==
- List of number-one dance singles of 2011 (U.S.)
- List of number-one songs of 2011 (Russia)
- List of songs recorded by Dev
