= Take Her from You =

Promotional single by Dev

from the album The Night the Sun Came Up
- Released: March 20, 2012
- Recorded: 2011
- Genre: Synthpop, electronic rock
- Length: 3:25
- Label: Universal Republic
- Songwriters: Devin Tailes; Niles Hollowell-Dhar; David Singer-Vine
- Producer: The Cataracs

"Take Her from You" is a song by American singer Dev from the first version of her debut studio album, The Night the Sun Came Up (2011). It was released on March 20, 2012. The song was co-written by Dev and The Cataracs. A music video was released on February 28, 2012. The song was included on the original international releases of her album in September 2011 and on the subsequent rerelease, but it was omitted from the American release in March 2012 for undisclosed reasons.

== Track listings ==
- Digital download
1. "Take Her from You" – 3:25

== Charts ==
"Take Her from You" reached #5 on 'Top 10 New Pop Songs Chart' from Top 40/Pop

== Music video ==
A music video, shot in black-and-white, was also released. The video was uploaded on February 28, 2012 on Dev's VEVO channel. The video opens with Dev singing and putting on makeup in the mirror. She appears with darker makeup on than her usual look. She has a body bag with a body inside that is moving around as she strokes it. Based on the lyrics of the song, the body in the bag could be the girl that Dev has taken. Dev ties off both ends of the body bag and drags it around the flat she is in to outside through an alley and on the street in front of bystanders. She leaves the body bag on the sidewalk and goes into a store where she is shown on a security camera coming in. Dev buys a drink and does not mind the cashiers suspicious of her. She comes back outside to the body bag and ends up stealing a car that a woman had left unattended. Dev drives until the sun goes down and takes out the body bag from the back of the car. She digs a hole and before leaving the body bag, she opens the bag to reveal the body in the bag was herself all along; Dev with much less makeup. The "girl" Dev has been singing about was herself, her past self that she has bagged up and gotten over. The last shot of the video is apparently Dev driving away as the videos fades to black.

== Release details ==
Region	Date	Label	Format
United States	March 20, 2012	Universal Republic	Digital download (iTunes)
