= Cathedral City High School =

Public high school in California, United States

Coordinates: 33°48′07″N 116°27′01″W

- 69250 Dinah Shore Dr., Cathedral City, CA 92234

Information
- Type: Public
- Established: 1991
- Principal: Julia Bartsch
- Teaching staff: 66.55 (FTE)
- Enrollment: 1,334 (2024–2025)
- Student to teacher ratio: 20.05
- Colors: Blue and Silver
- Rival: Palm Springs High School
- Mascot: Lion
- Website: cchs.psusd.us

Cathedral City High School is a public high school for grades 9–12. It is located in Cathedral City, California and is part of the Palm Springs Unified School District.

== History ==
The school was established in 1991.

== Notable alumni ==
- Timothy Ray Bradley Jr. (born 29 August 1983) WBO World Light Welterweight Champion.
- Jeff Jericho (born 25 November 1985), an American hip hop recording artist.
- Cub Swanson (born November 2, 1983) former professional Mixed Martial Artist.
- Jeremy Thornburg (born May 7, 1982 in Cathedral City, California) is an American football safety who played for the Green Bay Packers.
