= Jeremy Thornburg =

American football player (born 1982)

No. 45, 38
- Position: Safety

Personal information
- Born: May 7, 1982 (age 44); San Diego, California, U.S.
- Listed height: 6 ft 0 in (1.83 m)
- Listed weight: 190 lb (86 kg)

Career information
- High school: Cathedral City
- College: Northern Arizona
- NFL draft: 2005: undrafted

Career history
- Philadelphia Eagles (2005); San Francisco 49ers (2005); Green Bay Packers (2005)
- Stats at Pro Football Reference

Jeremy Robert Thornburg (born May 7, 1982) is an American football safety who played for the Green Bay Packers and San Francisco 49ers. He was signed as an undrafted free agent out of Northern Arizona University.

== Early life ==
Thornburg was born in San Diego, California. He attended Cathedral City High School in Cathedral City, California, and earned varsity letters in football, basketball, and track. In football, he earned three first-team All-Conference honors, and was the League Defensive MVP as a senior.

== College career ==
Thornburg attended Northern Arizona University for five years. He received Special Teams M.V.P in 2000. Team Defensive M.V.P in 2003 and 2004. All Conference honors in 2003 and 2004. Thornburg also led the Lumberjacks in tackles in 2003 and 2004.
