= Aris Jerome =

- Born: Aris Jerome; November 26, 1989 (age 36); Fremont, California, United States
- Known for: Photography, Videography, Painting

Aris Jerome was born and raised in Fremont, California. Inspired by the Bay Area music scene, he began collaborating with local music artists and creating hundreds of underground music videos. This eventually led him to move to Los Angeles at the age of 20.

== Career ==
Aris Jerome began his career filming music videos for artists in the San Francisco Bay Area scene such as E-40, The Jacka, Lil B, Mistah FAB, and Kreayshawn. His early success compelled him to move to Los Angeles, where he started shooting videos for artists Ty Dolla Sign, Talib Kweli, Omarion, among others. In 2014 - 2015 Aris Jerome photographed numerous female celebrities, including Selena Gomez and Zendaya Coleman.

In 2017, Aris Jerome held his first photo exhibition titled MOODS.

== Exhibitions ==
- MOODS exhibition 2017, Los Angeles

== Videography ==
- DEV - Parade
- Kalin and Myles - Broken Hearted
- Iamsu! - Hipster Girls
