= Taambdi Chaamdi =

Single by Shreyas ,Kratex
- Language: Marathi
- Released: May 2024
- Genre: EDM
- Length: 2:38
- Label: Spinnin' Records
- Songwriter: Shreyas Sagvekar
- Producer: Kratex

Music video
- "Taambdi Chaamdi" on YouTube

"Taambdi Chaamdi" (transl. "Brown Skin") is a song by Indian DJ Kratex and Indian rapper Shreyas. The song was released in May 2024. Spinnin' Records released its music video on its YouTube channel on 25 August 2024. The song is written by Shreyas and Kratex, with Kratex handling its music and production. It is a Marathi rap with EDM bass. The music video is directed by Omkar Kanerkar and Karan Hanskar.

== Writing and composition ==
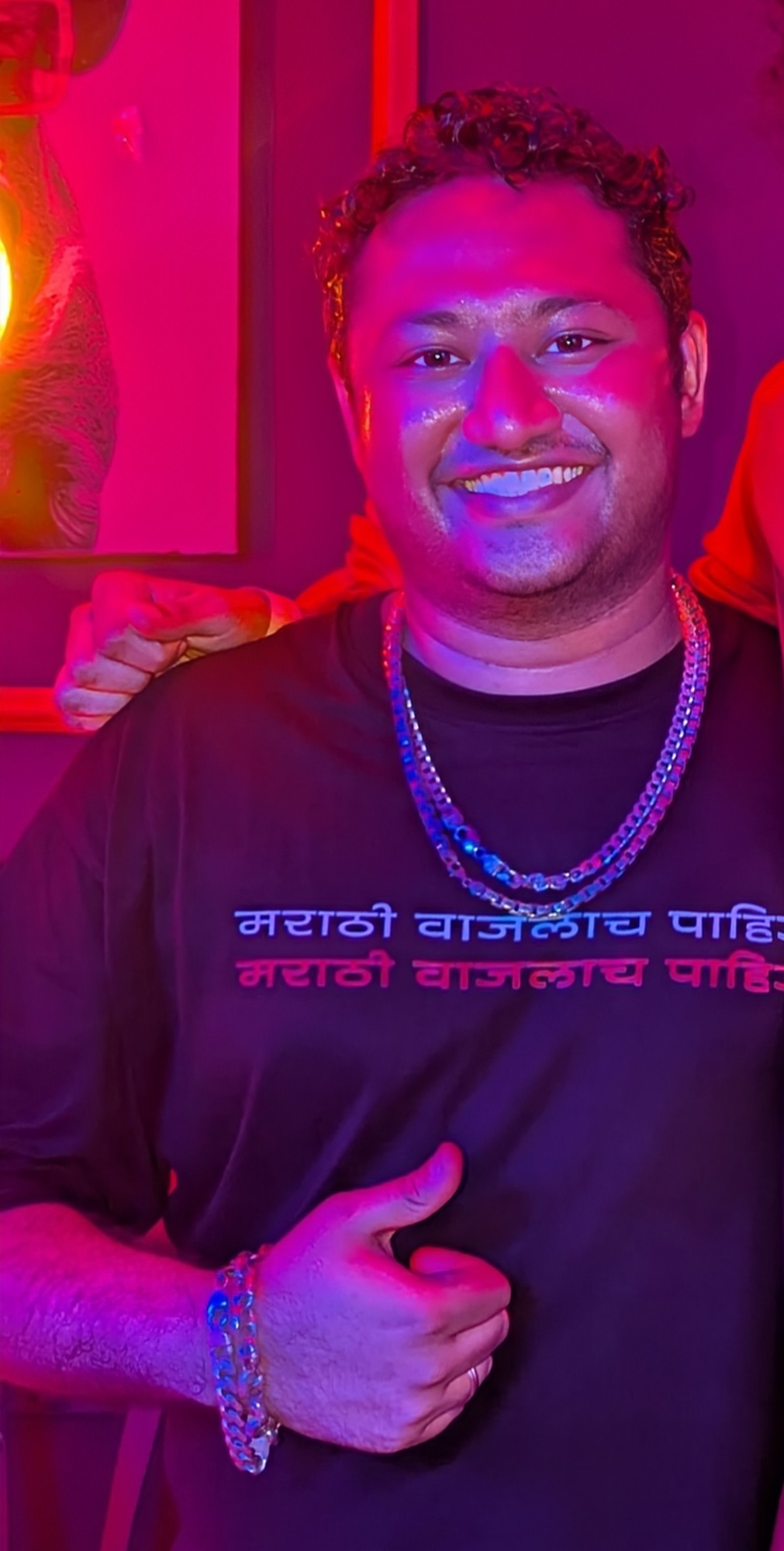
Kratex in 2025

Kratex was initially requested to compose a song by a South Indian actor, who later got busy. Kratex, who had composed the initial beat within an hour, then requested Shreyas to share some Marathi rap to accompany the beat. Shreyas and Kratex had previously met at a songwriting bootcamp. While Kratex had initially intended the song to be a South Indian-Marathi-House collaboration, he was impressed by Shreyas's response and decided to go ahead without the South Indian actor's collaboration.

The song's lyrics refer to being comfortable in one's own skin. Shreyas described that the song's hook comes from his realisation that his brown skin does not just burn when exposed to the Sun, but also shines. The term "Lakalakalaka" is used by Marathi speakers to describe something that shines or glimmers. Shreyas describes:

There were a variety of trees outside the house in my village in Ratnagiri. In the evening, a swarm of fireflies would descend on the cashew trees. My grandfather would point them out to me and say, "Lakh lakh karun chamaktoy" which means "See how they’re 'shining'". So that’s where the term "lakh lakh" comes from. I extended it to "lakalakalakalakalaka" for the song.

Shreyas further describes:

It is about a middle-class Marathi boy going about his day, stopping in the middle of the commute to splash water on his face to feel better.

== Music video ==
Spinnin' Records released its music video on its YouTube channel on 25 August 2024. It is directed by Karan Hanskar and Omkar Kanerkar, with the concept proposed by influencers Tejas Shetye and Aakash Salunkhe. Vogue describes the video's premise as "Don’t teach your father how to make babies."

The video features Marathi influencers Tejas and Manish Shetye, Aakash Salunkhe, Mrunali Shirke and Malhar Jadhav. It follows a father (Manish), who is fed up with the partying habits of his son (Tejas) and decides to try it out himself. He wears an iridescent suit and shiny sneakers and ends up partying even harder than his son.

While Kratex had initially intended to release the song on his own YouTube channel, he was then approached by the head of Spinnin' Records. Kratex describes that he wanted the video to demonstrate that Indians don't always wear saris and kurtas and are normal people who go to parties.

Directors Kanerkar and Hanskar shot the video in public places, attracting the attention of the public. They also faced problems with the rental polychromatic suit worn by Manish after it was bought by someone else; they later stitched a new set. This led to shooting delays.

== Commercial performance ==
As of September 2024, the song had 4.2 million streams on Spotify and was ranked at twenty on the Daily Viral Songs India on Spotify charts. It also featured on popular Spotify playlists like Rap 91 and Hot Hits Marathi. The song also had more than 53 lakh views on its YouTube video and had over 37,000 reels on Instagram.

== Remix ==
Kshmr remixed the song in December 2024, stating that he was "moved by the track's authenticity and cultural pride."
