= Roll a D6 =

Song
- Released: May 4, 2011
- Length: 4:26
- Songwriter: Connor Anderson

"Roll a D6" is a parody of Far East Movement's song "Like a G6" adapted by Connor Anderson. The song was written during a game of Dungeons & Dragons in about four hours and the whole video took about four weeks to complete. The song, recorded despite the fact that Anderson had only occasionally played Dungeons & Dragons, was accompanied by a music video which gained 40,000 views in four days, and as of October 2023 has received more than 2.6 million views.
