= The Night the Sun Came Up =

Studio album by Dev
- Released: August 31, 2011
- Recorded: 2010–2011
- Genres: Electropop; dance-pop
- Length: 43:45
- Label: Universal Republic
- Producer: The Cataracs

Dev chronology
The Night the Sun Came Up (2011)	Bittersweet July (2014)

Singles from The Night the Sun Came Up
- 1. "Bass Down Low" Released: November 16, 2010; 2. "In the Dark" Released: April 25, 2011; 3. "Naked" Released: December 20, 2011; 4. "In My Trunk" Released: February 14, 2012

The Night the Sun Came Up is the debut studio album by American singer Dev, released on August 31, 2011 by Universal Republic Records. Dev worked exclusively with American electropop production duo The Cataracs and Alan De la Rosa, who helmed the production of the entire album along with co-writing songs with Dev. Production on the album took place mainly in January 2011 and continued into 2012 as the North American release date for the album was delayed from September 20, 2011 to January 10, 2012 as per Dev's request to add more songs to the album, with Amazon.com announcing that the North American release would be pushed back further to March 26, 2012.

The album received mixed to positive reviews, with critics commending the production of many of the songs while comparing the album to the electropop stylings of Kesha and Robyn. The Night the Sun Came Up is mainly an electropop and dance-pop album, which incorporates elements of several musical genres such as dubstep and urban. The themes of the album range from sex and partying to introspection, love and life, with the songs being mostly inspired by Dev's life over the past few years. In the United States, the album reached a peak of number sixty-one, selling 7,560 copies in its first week of release. It also peaked at number 136 on the UK Albums Chart.

The first two singles from The Night the Sun Came Up, "Bass Down Low" and "In the Dark", were both moderate international hits, with "Bass Down Low" peaking within the top ten of the UK Singles Chart. "In the Dark" was more successful in North America, peaking at number eleven on the Billboard Hot 100 in the United States and at number thirteen on the Canadian Hot 100 in Canada. It charted in more commercial markets, reaching the summit of the IFPI chart in Slovakia.

== Background ==
Devin Tailes recorded a cover of Amy Winehouse's "Back to Black" in response to her ex-boyfriend's new girlfriend, calling it a "diss track". The song was placed on Myspace and discovered by production team The Cataracs. She was then signed by the Los Angeles-based record label and management team, Indie-Pop, who also discovered The Cataracs. Months later, their song "2Nite" began to gain exposure on the radio, the television channel MTVU and the Billboard Hot Dance Airplay chart. In 2009, Dev moved to Los Angeles to produce music with the Cataracs and work directly with Indie-Pop. During that time, songs like "Fireball" and "Booty Bounce" were made.

The latter track was produced in the same summer as The Cataracs produced "Like a G6", at the time where Dev and the Cataracs "were grinding it out in the studio pretty tough together", making a couple of "simplistic random tracks." "Like a G6", which features the Cataracs and Dev, was released in April 2010, and reached number one on the US Billboard Hot 100 chart in October of that year, prompting Universal Republic to sign her on as an artist in the same month.

== Recording and development ==
The boys and me have that under control but listeners should understand music is self-expression and don’t take anything too seriously. In 2011 The Cataracs and myself have the ability to change the game, blend the music world by providing the weird California swag and sound were on. The sounds, The Cataracs & me choose, the lingo we use, and we know what's up. I feel like a lot of artists try to get there and it's almost there but the lingo is off, the beats are wrong and I can tell those things because we’ve already started the movement, that "pop revolution" everyone is talking about.

— Dev on the material of her debut studio album and their (with The Cataracs) influence in pop music.

The album's production process began in January 2011 in Costa Rica. The Cataracs, who helmed the entire album's production, worked with Dev on the songwriting for the album, helping her with the themes to help diversify the content. She said that they were perfect producers for her, noting that "they made really fun songs for kids on the radio and at the same time they were normal boys, eating burritos, chilling in Berkeley", which is what she felt connected her with them. She hinted early on in the interview that she had an interest in working with other people for the album, noting that other producers and writers have contacted her. She later came back stating "I think me and The Cataracs are on a really good streak right now and it's not intentional."

Dev moved in with The Cataracs to produce the album. She claimed the experience to be "beautiful" and felt like being in a movie. She also claimed the experience gave the album "an amazing vibe." On interview with Alex Kazemi of FashionIndie, Dev stated that their sessions are very different and complicated, further commenting "It really depends, some times the boys will come to me and say "I’ve been wanting to do this song but this is more of a DEV track" and from there Niles will show me the beat and me and David will come up with lyrics or some times I go to them when I have written some sort of idea and they will help me elaborate on it to the point where we can have a song." During the time they were in Costa Rica, they recorded thirteen to fourteen songs for the album. The song, "Take Her From You", was composed while in Costa Rica recording the album. The song was originally written by one of The Cataracs for himself and while reading some of the lyrics, Dev expressed her interest in recording the song.

== Concept and themes ==
According to Dev, the album is an attempt to escape the comparisons to other artists in the electropop genre, including American recording artist Kesha and singer-songwriter Uffie. She noted that the comparisons helped motivate her to take the music to a new level and sing on the majority of the album. She further explains that the material on the album has more diversity, bringing together different sounds and conveying more depth in the songwriting. She described that the songs are influenced by hip hop and electro music. The album, according to Dev, will bring together "my [Dev] intricate influences and The Cataracs simple influences." While on interview with KiSS 92.5, she commented that the music on the set will contain music stylized toward club and dance music and hip-hop influenced tracks where she will rap the entire song.

== Composition ==
"This is my chance to let everybody know who I was because the public only knows me from "Bass Down Low" and "G6" and I wanted to express everything that I had to say and everything that I have been through and my stories for these last few years. It was important for me to be honest and be vulnerable. I think you can hear that on the album. Songs like "Perfect Match", "Getaway", "Dancing Shoes" and "Shadows" that are all really pretty. That is what I want to do. I want the next album to have more of those and be more mature. And be able to perform beautiful songs with instrumentation. I think that I am getting there. It meant a lot to me for this album to not only be sassy, but to be really pretty as well."

— Dev explaining the content of The Night the Sun Came Up.

The Night the Sun Came Up is primary an electropop and dance album, which incorporates elements of several different genres such as dubstep, hip hop, Eurodance, urban, rock and club influenced-pop music Dev said that her mission with the album was to make it diversified, incorporating different elements of music to make an eclectic set. She also said that the album has two sides to it, sassy and pretty. The sassy songs are based on the themes of sex, partying and different forms of debauchery while the pretty songs are contemplative ballads that are based more on introspection and love. Much of the album's lyrics are influenced by her life and her experiences. The album opens with "Getaway", a hip hop track with influences of soul music. The song starts out with the use of a piano, transitions into hip-hop styled music and features a breakdown in which she raps and rhymes. The next song "In My Trunk" runs through an electronic tinged hip hop beat and features vehicle metaphors in its lyrics. The third track of the album, "Me", contains influences of adult contemporary music.

The fourth song "Breathe" is an electronic dance song that contains influences of Middle Eastern and club music. It is written about sex and the effects of love on Dev and features the use of an accordion throughout. The album's fifth track, "Take Her From You", differs completely from the electronic soundscape of the album, as it is inspired by rock and roll music. When Dev heard the song, she responded "'Oh, I really like that. It could almost be a flip of me singing about myself.' ... [We considered] maybe we should change around the perspective, but I was like, 'No. Let's keep it like that.'" The sixth track, "Lightspeed", is an electronic pop song that in its production draws inspiration from house and club music. It makes use of kickdrums, synth arrangements, Auto-Tune and numerous noises like a cough. Its synth riff and beat structure resembles those in the music made by Dutch disc jockey Afrojack. The seventh track, "Dancing Shoes" is built upon synthesizers and drums while making use of pianos and guitars to produce an uptempo electronic rock ballad about performing onstage. The song's "pretty" sound is inspired by teen pop music

After "Dancing Shoes" is the eighth track, "Perfect Match", a guitar driven ballad that features a string section reminiscent of that featured in "Clocks" by British alternative rock group Coldplay. In "Bass Down Low", the ninth song and first single, Dev speaks of taking shots and various forms of debauchery. It is an electro song with skittering synths and a pulsating electropop groove in which Dev utilizes her sing-talk vocal style throughout the song, but also uses her singing voice near the end. The Night the Sun Came Up's tenth track "Kiss My Lips", the third single from the album in the United States, contains a guitar that blends synthesizers prominent in dance music with a hip hop styled drum beat. In the song, she sings to a lover "Get you hand off my hip/And kiss my lips, kiss my lips, kiss me all over/ Are you gonna take that risk, take that risk, 'cause only getting older." "In the Dark" has a house rhythm and a prominent saxophone riff that serves as the song's instrumentation. while featuring Eurodance beats and synths, mixed with influences of Latin music. The twelfth track is "Shadows", a song that draws from influences of folk music

== Reception ==
=== Critical reception ===
Professional ratings
Aggregate scores
Source	Rating
Metacritic	71/100
Review scores
Source	Rating
About.com	3.5/5 stars
Allmusic	4/5 stars
The Border Mail	4/5 stars
Idolator	(favorable)
Rolling Stone	3.5/5 stars
Slant Magazine	3/5 stars
UR Chicago	3.5/5 stars
USA Today	3/4 stars

The album received "generally favorable reviews" from contemporary music critics with an aggregated score metascore of 71 of 100 in Metacritic. Chuck Eddy from Rolling Stone gave to the album 3.5 out of 5 stars, writing that the album "is as stark as it is sweet, owed partly to the casually giddy lightness of her talk-singing ." Ben Norman from About.com gave to the album three stars out of five, summarizing that "Dev's debut album is at least little more than pandering to the mainstream. There are some interesting tracks that give us flashes of insight into the minds creating the works. Whether the credit goes to Dev or to her producers is uncertain but almost irrelevant, as long as you enjoy it. That being said, The Night The Sun Came Up is well-crafted, quality dance/pop. If Dev achieves another hit from it, I'll be shocked." Jamie Horne of The Border Mail gave the album three and one-half stars, praised the album as "engaging", noting the ranges of music influences, including dance, rock and folk, and noted that it was not boring. Chanun Poomsawai of Bangkok Post reviewed the album positively, praising its diversity and mixture of "fierce and mellow" and further commented that "this is a solid electro-edged pop album best played while you're getting dressed up before heading out for a night on the town." Elysa Gardner from USA Today wrote that on the album "her fresh, lissome vocals are actually more intriguing than the textural, tonal and rhythmic shifts that pop up in the sometimes sweetly groovy but mostly unremarkable tunes."

Music rating website Musicovered gave the album three out of ten stars, stating the album comes short of expectations and that the production was sloppy, with many of the album's tracks sounding the same. Sal Cinquemani shares the same feeling on his review of the album for Slant Magazine, rating the album three stars out of five. He adds that the album fails to distinguish her from electro-pop artist Kesha while praising her rapping style, comparing it to that of Swedish recording artist Robyn, and the song "In the Dark" for blending European dance music with flourishes of Latin and Mediterranean music. Neil Miller, Jr. of UR Chicago rated the album three out of five stars (on the site, they use meatballs), calling it "one of the most unbalanced pop records" ever released. Idolator however claims that to peg Dev as a Kesha clone is dangerous as she has a greater air of mystery than Kesha and the positive review ends with "for those out there who like the soundtrack to their late-night fiesta to come with a bit more subtlety".

=== Commercial performance ===
In the United States, The Night The Sun Came Up debuted on the Billboard 200 chart on the week of April 14, 2012 at number sixty one with 6,700 copies sold.

== Singles ==
The debut single off the album is "Bass Down Low", which was produced by and features The Cataracs. The song was released on November 16, 2010. The UK mix of the song, which features the Cataracs and British rapper Tinie Tempah was released on May 23, 2011. The song peaked at 61 on the US Billboard Hot 100. It peaked at the highest of the Heatseekers Songs at number 2.

The second single off the album "In the Dark", was also produced by the Cataracs. It was released on April 26, 2011. It currently peaks at the Billboard Hot 100 at 11. It also topped the Heatseekers chart and has fared better than "Bass Down Low." The third single is "Naked" featuring Enrique Iglesias.

In addition to her first three singles which all have music videos, Dev has made promotional videos for the songs "Kiss My Lips", "Take Her from You", "Lightspeed", "In My Trunk", "Dancing Shoes", and "Me".

== Track listing ==
Original European release
No.	Title	Writer(s)	Producer(s)	Length
1.	"Getaway"	Devin Tailes; Niles Hollowell-Dhar; David Singer-Vine	The Cataracs	2:21
2.	"In My Trunk"	Tailes; Hollowell-Dhar; Singer-Vine	The Cataracs	3:18
3.	"Me"	Tailes; Alan De La Rosa; Singer-Vine	The Cataracs	3:37
4.	"Breathe"	Tailes; Hollowell-Dhar	The Cataracs	3:40
5.	"Take Her from You"	Tailes; Alan De La Rosa; Singer-Vine	The Cataracs	3:26
6.	"Lightspeed"	Tailes; Hollowell-Dhar; Singer-Vine	The Cataracs	4:00
7.	"Dancing Shoes"	Tailes; Hollowell-Dhar	The Cataracs	5:03
8.	"Perfect Match"	Tailes; Alan De La Rosa; Singer-Vine	The Cataracs	3:19
9.	"Bass Down Low" (featuring The Cataracs)	Tailes; Hollowell-Dhar; Singer-Vine	The Cataracs	3:30
10.	"Kiss My Lips"	Tailes; Hollowell-Dhar; Singer-Vine	The Cataracs	3:27
11.	"In the Dark"	Tailes; Hollowell-Dhar; Singer-Vine	The Cataracs	3:48
12.	"Shadows"	Tailes; Alan De La Rosa	The Cataracs	4:23
Total length:				43:43

UK digital and Amazon bonus tracks
No.	Title	Writer(s)	Producer(s)	Length
13.	"Bass Down Low" (Remix featuring Tinie Tempah)	Tailes, Hollowell-Dhar, Singer-Vine, Tinie Tempah	The Cataracs (additional production and vocals by Tinie Tempah)	3:29
14.	"In the Dark" (Remix featuring Flo Rida)	Tailes, Hollowell-Dhar, Singer-Vine, Flo Rida	The Cataracs (additional vocals by Flo Rida)	3:48
Total length:				51:00

Australia, Asia and UK special digital bonus tracks
No.	Title	Writer(s)	Producer(s)	Length
15.	"Killer"		The Cataracs	3:27
16.	"Top of the World" (The Cataracs featuring Dev)	The Cataracs, Tailes	The Cataracs	3:41
Total length:				58:08

Australia and UK iTunes Store bonus videos
No.	Title	Writer(s)	Producer(s)	Length
17.	"Bass Down Low" (Music video)	Tailes, Hollowell-Dhar, Singer-Vine	Ethan Lader (Director)	3:39
18.	"In the Dark" (Music video)	Tailes, Hollowell-Dhar, Singer-Vine	Ethan Lader (Director)	3:46
Total length:				65:33

US and Canadian digital release
No.	Title	Writer(s)	Producer(s)	Length
1.	"Getaway"	Devin Tailes, Niles Hollowell-Dhar, David Singer-Vine	The Cataracs	2:21
2.	"In My Trunk"	Tailes, Hollowell-Dhar, Singer-Vine	The Cataracs	3:18
3.	"Me"	Tailes, Hollowell-Dhar, Singer-Vine	The Cataracs	3:37
4.	"Naked" (with Enrique Iglesias)	Tailes, Hollowell-Dhar, Singer-Vine, Iglesias	The Cataracs	3:58
5.	"Lightspeed"	Tailes, Hollowell-Dhar, Singer-Vine	The Cataracs	4:00
6.	"Breathe"	Tailes, Hollowell-Dhar, Singer-Vine	The Cataracs	3:40
7.	"Dancing Shoes"	Tailes, Hollowell-Dhar	The Cataracs	5:03
8.	"Perfect Match"	Tailes, Hollowell-Dhar, Singer-Vine	The Cataracs	3:19
9.	"In the Dark"	Tailes, Hollowell-Dhar, Singer-Vine	The Cataracs	3:48
10.	"Kiss My Lips" (featuring Fabolous)	Tailes, Hollowell-Dhar, Singer-Vine	The Cataracs	3:51
11.	"Shadows"	Tailes, Hollowell-Dhar	The Cataracs	4:23
Total length:				41:18

International digital bonus track
No.	Title	Writer(s)	Producer(s)	Length
12.	"Bass Down Low" (featuring The Cataracs)	Tailes, Hallowell-Dhar, Singer-Vine	The Cataracs	3:31
Total length:				44:48

US iTunes Store bonus track
No.	Title	Writer(s)	Producer(s)	Length
12.	"Don't Hurt It" (featuring Timbaland)	Tailes, Hallowell-Dhar, Singer-Vine	The Cataracs	4:01
Total length:				45:19

Canadian iTunes Store bonus track
No.	Title	Writer(s)	Producer(s)	Length
13.	"Bass Down Low" (featuring The Cataracs)	Tailes, Hallowell-Dhar, Singer-Vine	The Cataracs	3:31
Total length:				48:49

Brazil and UK repackaged edition
No.	Title	Writer(s)	Producer(s)	Length
9.	"In the Dark" (Remix featuring Flo Rida)	Tailes, Hollowell-Dhar, Singer-Vine, Flo Rida	The Cataracs (additional vocals by Flo Rida)	3:48
12.	"Don't Hurt It" (featuring Timbaland)	Tailes, Hallowell-Dhar, Singer-Vine	The Cataracs	4:01
13.	"Take Her from You"	Tailes; Alan De La Rosa; Singer-Vine	The Cataracs	3:26
14.	"Bass Down Low" (featuring The Cataracs)	Tailes, Hallowell-Dhar, Singer-Vine	The Cataracs	3:31
15.	"Bass Down Low" (Remix featuring Tinie Tempah)	Tailes, Hollowell-Dhar, Singer-Vine, Tinie Tempah	The Cataracs (additional production and vocals by Tinie Tempah)	3:29
Total length:				55:44

== Charts ==
Chart (2011–2012)	Peak position
Canadian Albums Chart	67
UK Albums Chart	136
US Billboard 200	61
US Dance/Electronic Albums	6
US Digital Albums	14

== Release history ==
Country	Date	Label	Format(s)
Australia	August 31, 2011	Universal Music	Digital download
Germany	September 2, 2011	Universal Music	CD, digital download
United Kingdom	September 5, 2011	Island Records	CD, digital download
Poland	September 16, 2011	Universal Music	CD, digital download
Australia	September 21, 2011	Universal Music	CD
United Kingdom	September 29, 2011	Island Records	Digital download (Re-release)
United States	March 26, 2012	Universal Republic Records	Digital download
