= Kiss It =

Single by Dev featuring Sage the Gemini
- Released: December 13, 2013
- Genre: Hip hop; bubblegum pop
- Length: 3:18
- Label: Republic Records
- Songwriters: Devin Tailes; Chauncey Hollis; Brian Lee; Eric Bellinger; Rashad Muhammad; Raymond Martin; Dominic Wynn Woods
- Producers: Hit-Boy; HazeBanga; Rey Reel

Dev singles chronology
"In My Trunk" (2012)	"Kiss It" (2013)	"Honey Dip" (2014)

Sage the Gemini singles chronology
"Gas Pedal" (2013)	"Kiss It" (2013)	"Only That Real" (2014)

"Kiss It" is a song recorded by American singer Dev featuring American rapper Sage the Gemini. It was released by Republic Records on December 12, 2013, as a single in anticipation of Dev's second EP, Bittersweet July (2014), with her posting a preview of the song on Facebook. It was written by Dev, Brian Lee, Eric Bellinger, Sage the Gemini, and its producers Hit-Boy, HazeBanga, and Rey Reel. "Kiss It" is a hip hop, swag song with synth influences that speaks about uncaring attitude.

== Critical reception ==
The song received generally positive reviews from the critics. Billboard rated the song three stars and half out of five saying that "the singer indulges in sass and sarcasm on the track, which is highlighted by a buoyant verse from new labelmate Sage the Gemini, who sounds surprisingly comfortable assisting on a pop track". Idolator.com also praised the song saying that "the snappy hip-hop/pop tune appears basically a raised middle finger at her haters with a very catchy result, unluckily ruined by a maladjusted slow rap by featuring artist Sage the Gemini".

== Music video ==
The music video for "Kiss It" was directed by Corey Nichols and released on VEVO on March 31, 2014. It shows Dev and Sage in a vintage villa with an inflatable pool and marble figurines. Dev sings the chorus while she's at the phone smoking and browsing magazines with disinterestedness. The video serves as the advertising campaign for the make-up chain of CK Colors lipsticks. Sage appears shirtless in the video, while he's cutting the garden grass with a mower. A "flip-book" lyric video with pop-art style was released on December 10, 2013 on the Dev's fansite YouTube channel. Both the music video and the lyric video passed together one million of views before the end of 2014.

== Chart performance ==
"Kiss It" debuted on Billboard Rhythmic Songs chart at number 38 on the issue dated April 26, 2014.

== Charts ==
Chart (2014)	Peak position
US Rhythmic Airplay (Billboard)	34
