= Bittersweet July =

2014 extended play by Dev

EP by Dev
- Released: September 23, 2014
- Recorded: Spring 2014
- Genre: Electropop
- Length: 17:08
- Label: Rica Lyfe
- Producers: Benny Cassette; Rayintosh; MNDR; NanosauR

Dev chronology
The Night the Sun Came Up (2011)	Bittersweet July (2014)	Bittersweet July, Pt. 2 (2014)

Singles from Bittersweet July
- 1. "Honey Dip" Released: November 5, 2014

Bittersweet July is the second extended play (EP) by American singer Dev, released on September 23, 2014 by her own record label Rica Lyfe Records. It is her first project released since her debut studio album The Night the Sun Came Up (2011). Dev worked mainly with NanosauR, followed by Benny Cassette and Peter Wade (MNDR). "Honey Dip" was released as the lead single from Bittersweet July on November 5, 2014.

The EP was followed by a second part, Bittersweet July, Pt. 2, released on December 15, 2014. The two EPs will subsequently be put together in one album.

== Composition ==
Bittersweet July is primarily an electropop EP, which incorporates influences of several different genres such as hip hop, dance music and electronica.

The EP starts with the first single "Honey Dip", a synthpop song with rap verses before the chorus, sung with a style called by the critics "talked singing". The next song "Feel It" runs through an electronic tinged house beats mixed with influences of 90s music produced by Peter Wade from MNDR. The third song "Baby, We Go" is an electronic song that contains influences of teen-pop music, about the meaning of the song Dev said "'It's a song about almost losing the chance to be with someone we love. But we realize we're better together than apart." The album's fourth track, "Kids" is an electronic pop song produced by NanosauR whose robotic sound are a strong reminder to the early works of the singer, it was released as the promotional single on August 11, 2014. The fifth track is "Who Needs A Heart", another teen-pop song with influences of dance music.

== Track listing ==
No.	Title	Writer(s)	Producer(s)	Length
1.	"Honey Dip"	Devin Star Tailes; David Singer-Vine	Benny Cassette, Rayintosh	3:52
2.	"Feel It"	Devin Star Tailes	Peter Wade	4:02
3.	"Baby, We Go"	Devin Star Tailes	NanosauR	3:22
4.	"Kids"	Devin Star Tailes	NanosauR	2:58
5.	"Who Needs a Heart"	Devin Star Tailes	NanosauR	2:54
Total length:				17:09

== Bittersweet July, Pt. 2 ==
Bittersweet July, Pt. 2

EP by Dev
- Released: December 15, 2014
- Recorded: Spring 2014
- Genre: Electropop
- Length: 16:26
- Label: Rica Lyfe
- Producer: NanosauR

Dev chronology
Bittersweet July (2014)	Bittersweet July, Pt. 2 (2014)	I Only See You When I'm Dreamin' (2017)

Singles from Bittersweet July, Pt. 2
- 1. "Parade" Released: March 24, 2015

Bittersweet July, Pt. 2 is the third extended play (EP) by American singer Dev, released on December 15, 2014 by Rica Lyfe Records. It serves as a follow-up to part 1. Dev this time worked exclusively with NanosauR, who helmed the production of the entire EP. The songs from the EP feature an overall dark appearance (a stark contrast from the first part) and a heavily electronic dance-influenced sound. "Parade" was released as the lead single from Bittersweet July, Pt. 2 on March 24, 2015.

=== Composition ===
The EP starts with "You Want Me", a psychedelic electronic song which was defined as a darker, crazier version of "Dark Horse" by Katy Perry. It is followed by "Gimmie Some", an electronic ballad with influences of 1990s music and continuous swinging synth bass produced by Peter Wade of MNDR as well as "Feel It" from part 1. The third track, "Parade", is a rapped song showing low distorted bass similar to those of Dev previous hits "Like A G6" and "Bass Down Low"; it was released as the official single with a video on Vevo on March 24, 2015. "Celebrate the Weekend" is characterized by a high sung chorus and a strongly computerized pre-chorus. The last track, "The Night Is Young" is equipped of autotune effects and button-based stems. It was released as the countdown promotional single on December 5, 2014.

=== Reception ===
Dieke magazine positively reviewed "Parade" saying that "you can either love or hate Dev's music, but we happen to be on the love side" and calling it a "fun and track that mixes sassy vocals with a dope beat".

=== Track listing ===
No.	Title	Writer(s)	Producer(s)	Length
1.	"You Want Me"	Devin Star Tailes	NanosauR	2:48
2.	"Gimmie Some"	Devin Star Tailes	Peter Wade	2:52
3.	"Parade"	Devin Star Tailes	NanosauR	3:16
4.	"Celebrate the Weekend"	Devin Star Tailes	NanosauR	3:27
5.	"The Night Is Young"	Devin Star Tailes	NanosauR	4:04
Total length:				16:26

== Charts ==
Chart (2014)	Peak position
US Dance/Electronic Albums (Bittersweet July I)	16

Chart (2015)	Peak position
Japanese Albums (Oricon)	74

== Release history ==
Country	Date	Format	Label
Worldwide	September 23, 2014	Digital download (Bittersweet July I)	Rica Lyfe Records
Worldwide	December 15, 2014	Digital download (Bittersweet July II)	Rica Lyfe Records
United States	February 3, 2015	CD (Bittersweet July I & II)	Rica Lyfe Records
Japan	February 25, 2015	CD (Bittersweet July I & II)	Rica Lyfe Records
