= Top of the World (The Cataracs song) =

Single by The Cataracs featuring Dev
- Released: March 22, 2011
- Recorded: 2010
- Genre: Electro house
- Length: 3:41
- Label: Universal Republic
- Songwriters: Niles Hollowell-Dhar; David Benjamin Singer-Vine
- Producer: The Cataracs

The Cataracs singles chronology
"Backseat" (2011)	"Top of the World" (2011)	"Sunrise" (2011)

Dev singles chronology
"Backseat" (2011)	"Top of the World" (2011)	"In the Dark" (2011)

"Top of the World" is a song recorded by American hip hop record production project and duo The Cataracs. It was released as a single on March 22, 2011 as a digital download in the United States and Canada. The song features guest vocals from American singer Dev. An alternative, shorter version of the song was featured on Dev's 2011 mixtape, Is Hot: The Mixtape.

== Music video ==
The music video for the song premiered on YouTube on March 18, 2011.

== Track listing ==
Digital download
No.	Title	Length
1.	"Top of the World" (featuring Dev)	3:41

== Charts ==
Chart (2011)	Peak position
Belgium (Ultratip Bubbling Under Wallonia)	27
Belgium Dance (Ultratop Wallonia)	48
Canada Hot 100 (Billboard)	61
France (SNEP)	66

== Certifications ==
Region	Certification	Certified units/sales
United States (RIAA)	Gold	500,000^{‡}
^{‡} Sales+streaming figures based on certification alone.

== Release history ==
Region	Date	Format	Label
United States	March 22, 2011	Digital download	Universal Republic Records
