= Naked (Dev and Enrique Iglesias song) =

2011 single by Dev and Enrique Iglesias

Single by Dev and Enrique Iglesias

from the album The Night the Sun Came Up
- Released: December 20, 2011
- Genre: House; electro
- Length: 3:56
- Label: Universal Republic
- Songwriters: Devin Tailes; Niles Hollowell-Dhar; David Singer-Vine; Enrique Iglesias
- Producer: The Cataracs

Dev singles chronology
"Hotter Than Fire" (2011)	"Naked" (2011)	"In My Trunk" (2012)

Enrique Iglesias singles chronology
"I Like How It Feels" (2011)	"Naked" (2011)	"I Like (The Remix)" (2012)

Music video
- "DEV - Naked ft. Enrique Iglesias" on YouTube

"Naked" is a song by American singer Dev and Spanish singer Enrique Iglesias. The song was released as the third single from Dev's debut album The Night the Sun Came Up (2011) on December 20, 2011.

== Background ==
Naked serves as the third single from Dev's debut album The Night the Sun Came Up for its American release. It's a duet with Latin Pop singer Enrique Iglesias. The song was written by Dev herself along with Dev's longtime collaborators The Cataracs, Niles Hollowel-Dhar & David Singer-Vine, who also produced the track. Dev stated in an interview with AOL Music, "Enrique really made the record amazing, he added just the right amount of sexy and of course sounded great! Working with him was an awesome experience, shout out to all my fellow Latinas y Latinos out there!" Its chorus includes both the singers singing, "So I don’t care what they say it’s our life, life, life / We can dance if we want make it feel alright / Temperature’s rising I feel on fire / Tonight it’s just me and you". Dev breaks up & sings, "Tell me, baby, will you be here when I wake up, even with no makeup, I don’t wanna fake it" followed by Enrique, "and you don’t gotta doubt a second if I miss you, every time I’m with you, I feel naked". There is also a version of this song with R&B singer-songwriter T-Pain instead of Enrique Iglesias. Dev first announced that Naked will be the third single from her debut album by posting the artwork of the song on her official Facebook page on December 10, 2011. The same day it was uploaded to YouTube for fans to get a preview of the song. Since then the video has generated over 24 million views. The song also debuted at No. #1 on iTunes Mexico.

== Critical reception ==
The song has received critical acclaim with critics praising Dev & Enrique's vocals and also the dance-beats. Amy Sciarretto from Pop-Crush gave the song 3.5 stars (out of 5) quoting, "Dev‘s honeyed, cavity-causing voice snakes and slithers around Enrique Iglesias‘ on their sultry duet, ‘Naked.’ The song will have your blood surging through your veins and to your nether regions. It's a Eurodance-inspired club banger, with thumping backbeats and synths, but the heat generated by the new mom and the Latin pop star? That's as authentic as it gets. If it was Dev's and ‘Rique’s intention to get people hot and bothered by their song, starting things off on the dance floor and finishing them in the bedroom, then mission accomplished. It’s an upbeat, uptempo rump-shaker." Meena Rupani from the Desihits quoted, "Enrique's sultry vocals do well with Dev's ability to talk dirty and make it sound oh so good. The techno elements of the song is what Dev has come to be known for in her tracks so I'm not surprised she has incorporated that here also. Although, I prefer Dev's other tracks this collaboration was good in theory so I suppose a pat on the back can be given to both singers."

== Music video ==
The video was filmed in late February 2012 by director BBGun, the same who directed Enrique Iglesias video for "Tonight (I'm Lovin' You)". It was uploaded to Dev's official VEVO account on March 29, 2012. The video revolves around night life of Las Vegas where Dev and Enrique shown engaging in various activities from gambling to cruising in the clubs and streets.

== Track listing ==
- Digital download
1. "Naked" – 3:58
- Record Store Day 7-inch vinyl
1. "Naked" – 3:58
2. "Naked" (R3hab Remix) - 4:12

== Charts ==
=== Weekly charts ===
Chart (2012)	Peak position
Belgium (Ultratip Bubbling Under Flanders)	13
Belgium (Ultratip Bubbling Under Wallonia)	2
Canada Hot 100 (Billboard)	54
Canada CHR/Top 40 (Billboard)	40
Canada Hot AC (Billboard)	50
Denmark (Tracklisten)	26
Russia Airplay (TopHit)	32
Slovakia Airplay (ČNS IFPI)	17
South Korea International Singles	16
US Billboard Hot 100	99
US Dance Club Songs (Billboard)	2
US Pop Airplay (Billboard)	30
US Rhythmic Airplay (Billboard)	30

=== Year-end charts ===
Chart (2012)	Position
Russia Airplay (TopHit)	132
US Hot Dance Club Songs (Billboard)	7

== Radio and release history ==
=== Radio adds ===
Region	Date	Format
United States	January 17, 2012	Top 40 radio
United States	January 24, 2012	Rhythmic contemporary radio

=== Purchasable release ===
Region	Date	Format	Label
United States	December 20, 2011	Digital download	Universal Republic
Canada	December 20, 2011	Digital download	Universal Republic
Mexico	December 20, 2011	Digital download	Universal Republic
Australia	January 6, 2012	Digital download	Universal Republic
Austria	January 6, 2012	Digital download	Universal Republic
Belgium	January 6, 2012	Digital download	Universal Republic
Denmark	January 6, 2012	Digital download	Universal Republic
France	January 6, 2012	Digital download	Universal Republic
Italy	January 6, 2012	Digital download	Universal Republic
Netherlands	January 6, 2012	Digital download	Universal Republic
New Zealand	January 6, 2012	Digital download	Universal Republic
Norway	January 6, 2012	Digital download	Universal Republic
Spain	January 6, 2012	Digital download	Universal Republic
Sweden	January 6, 2012	Digital download	Universal Republic
Switzerland	January 6, 2012	Digital download	Universal Republic
Ireland	January 6, 2012	Digital download	Universal Republic
United Kingdom	January 6, 2012	Digital download	Universal Republic
