= Dev (singer) =

American singer (born 1989)

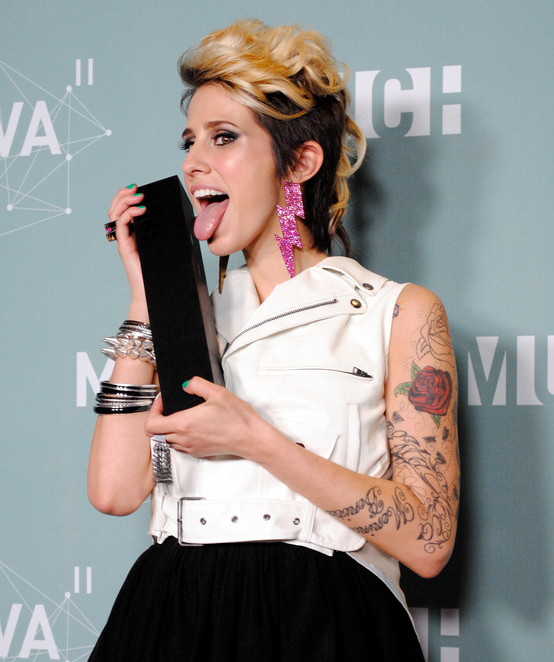
- Dev at the 2011 MuchMusic Video Awards
- Born: Devin Star Tailes; July 2, 1989 (age 37); Tracy, California, U.S.
- Occupations: Singer; songwriter; model; radio host
- Years active: 2009–present
- Works: Discography
- Partner: Jimmy Gorecki (2011–present)
- Children: 1
- Musical career
- Genres: Pop; electropop; hip hop; dance
- Labels: Island; Universal Republic; Republic; Rica Lyfe; RECORDS; SONGS

Devin Star Tailes (born July 2, 1989), known professionally as Dev (sometimes stylized as DEV or dEV), is an American singer and songwriter. She was discovered by the Cataracs and record label Indie-Pop via Myspace after Dev's friend posted a video of her singing. Dev's song "Booty Bounce" was sampled on Far East Movement's hit single "Like a G6", which reached number one in the US and sold over four million downloads in the country.

Dev was signed to Universal Republic in October 2010 and released her debut single, "Bass Down Low", on November 16, 2010, which peaked within the top ten of the charts in the United Kingdom. Her debut album, The Night the Sun Came Up, was released on March 27, 2012. The album's second single, "In the Dark", peaked at number 11 in the US chart, making it her most successful solo single to date. In 2014, Dev released two EPs, Bittersweet July and the second part as a follow-up to part one. She is also a radio host of the popular radio Beats 1 by Apple Inc., founded in 2015.

In mid-2016, Dev started promoting her second album with a lead single called "#1" (featuring Nef the Pharaoh), which reached the top 15 on the Billboard Rhythmic Songs chart. Dev's second studio album, I Only See You When I'm Dreamin', was made available for pre-order in July 2017; it includes the singles "All I Wanna Do" and "Come at Me" and is her first full-length project since 2011's The Night the Sun Came Up.

== Early life ==
Devin Star Tailes was born on July 2, 1989, in Tracy, California, to Lisa, a real estate agent, and Riki Tailes, a painting contractor. She has two younger sisters, Sierra Sol and Maezee Lua. Tailes is of Costa Rican, Portuguese, and Mexican descent. She grew up in the city of Manteca. At age 4, she began swimming and was part of the U.S. Olympic development program. She attended Brock Elliott Elementary and graduated from Sierra High School in 2007, where she was a member of band and choir. She attended San Joaquin Delta College, studying English and art history.

== Career ==
=== 2009–10: Career beginnings ===
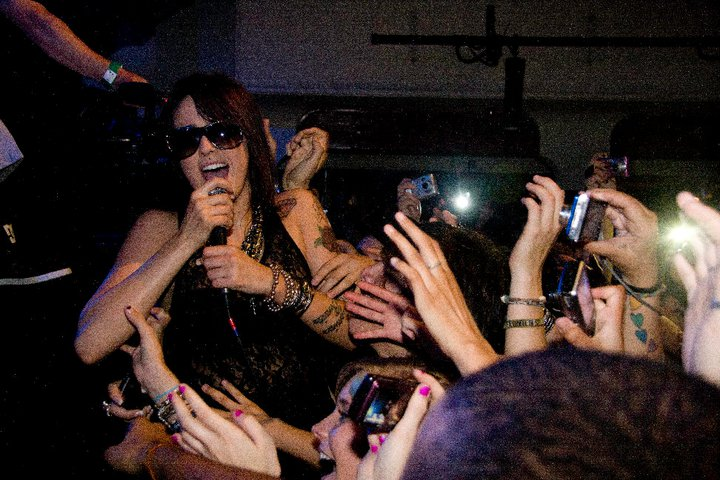
Dev in Santa Cruz, California, November 2010

In 2009, Dev made a cover of Amy Winehouse's "Back to Black", and, after a friend posted the song on MySpace along with an original song about an ex-boyfriend, the production team the Cataracs contacted Dev. To Fashion Indie Magazine, she said, "I decided to put up this song on MySpace. [...] it was basically a "diss track" and I didn't expect anything out of it. It was just to make me feel good like how music usually do but Niles [of the Cataracs] came across to my page and was really into my voice and they kind of got me into singing and opened up my eyes to business opportunities". She dropped out of college in her first year to pursue her singing career and was then signed by Los Angeles-based record label and management team, Indie-Pop, who also discovered the Cataracs. Six months later, Dev and the Cataracs' song "2Nite" began to gain exposure on the radio, the music video channel MTVU and the Billboard Hot Dance Airplay chart. In 2009, Dev moved to Los Angeles to produce music with the Cataracs and work directly with Indie-Pop.

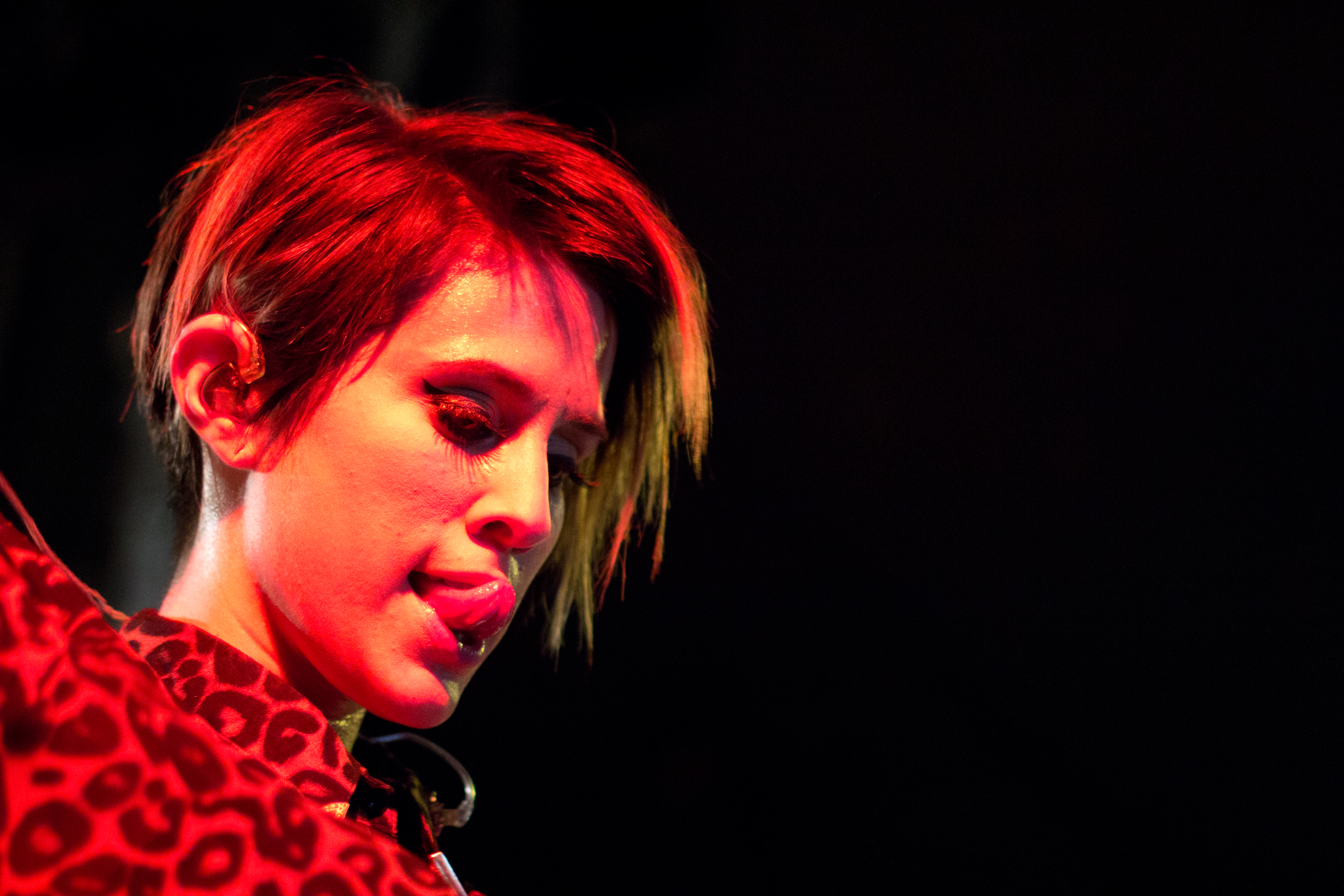
DEV in 2010

In 2010, the Cataracs produced "Like a G6" with Far East Movement and decided to use a verse from Dev's single "Booty Bounce" as the chorus. The two songs were made in the same summer, at the time where Dev and the Cataracs "were grinding it out in the studio pretty tough together," making a couple of "simplistic random tracks." "Like a G6", which features Far East Movement and Dev, was released in April 2010, and reached number one on the US Billboard Hot 100 chart. The song went on to sell over four million downloads in the US. In August 2010, a video was made for "Booty Bounce" directed by Ethan Lader, and uploaded it onto YouTube, where it has generated over 20 million views. In October 2010, Dev was signed to Universal Republic and her first official single, "Bass Down Low", was serviced to rhythmic radio stations in November. It was released digitally in select countries on December 6, 2010, and one day later in the United States. The song reached 61 on the Billboard Hot 100 chart and number two on the Heatseekers Songs chart. In Canada, the song peaked at number 35 in its fifth week on the Canadian Hot 100 chart. "Bass Down Low" achieved its greatest success in the United Kingdom, where it peaked at number ten on the UK Singles Chart in June 2011.

=== 2011–13: The Night the Sun Came Up ===
On April 25, 2011, she released the single "In the Dark". The song enjoyed commercial success in the United States, peaking at number 11 on the Billboard Hot 100 chart and the summit of Hot Dance Club Songs and peaked in the top 40 in Canada, Australia, Denmark, Ireland, Scotland, and the United Kingdom. The song's music video features shots of black-painted hands that touch Dev while she is standing naked. Dev's debut album The Night the Sun Came Up was released in United Kingdom on September 20, 2011. Since 2009, Dev has been working on her debut album with main producers, the Cataracs. In March 2011, Dev and the Cataracs travelled to Costa Rica for three weeks where they recorded and produced most of the material for the new album. She explained of the album's genres, "typical pop music is not what I am only good at doing; I have a lot of ideas and hip-hop influence records, some electro ballads." In March 2011, New Boyz's single "Backseat", featuring the Cataracs and Dev, was released. The song peaked at number 26 on the Billboard Hot 100. She was featured on Demi Lovato's album Unbroken on a song called "Who's That Boy". She featured on a song by British boy band JLS, "She Makes Me Wanna", which peaked at the top of the UK Singles Chart at #1 in the United Kingdom.

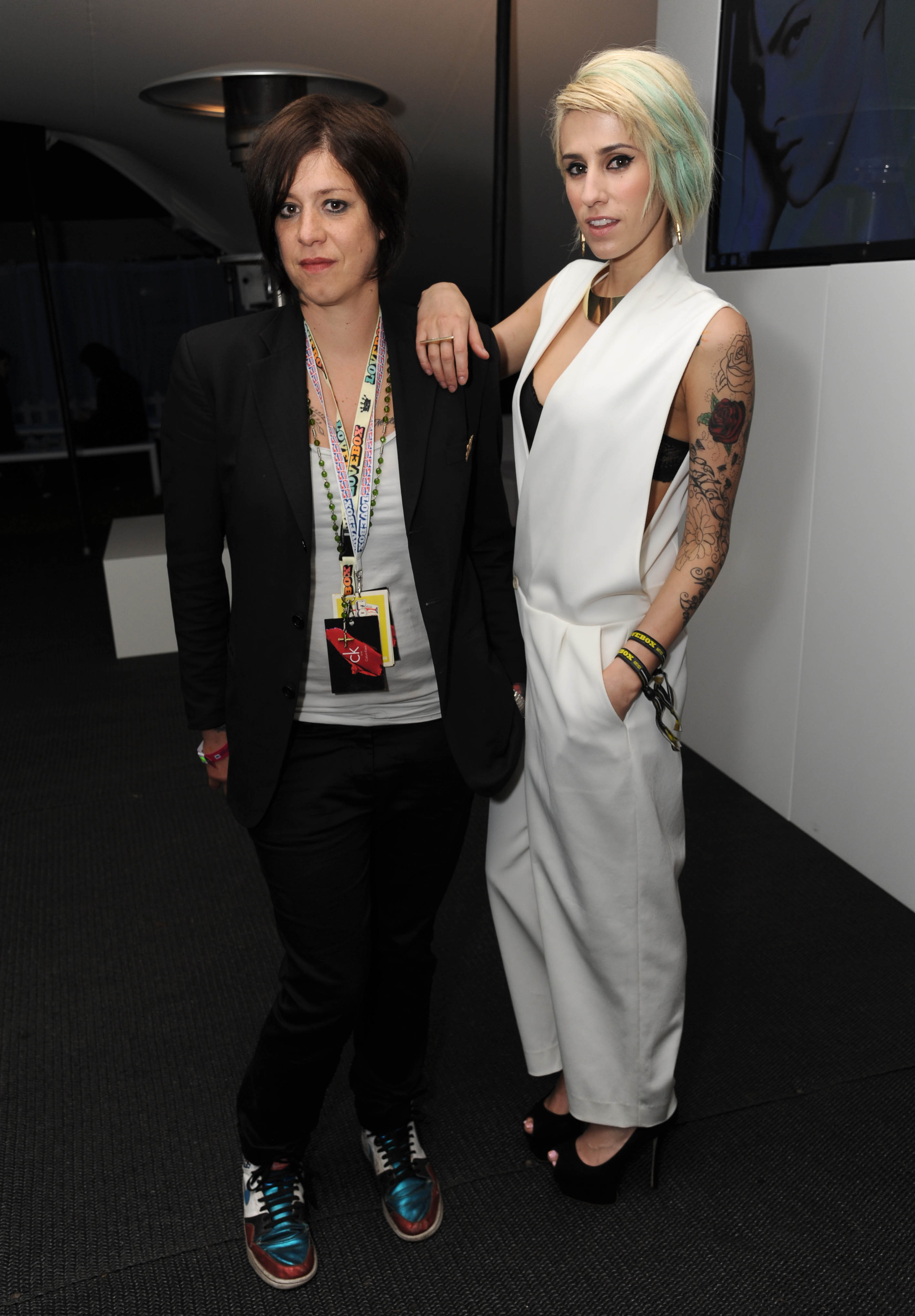
Dev with DJ El Conchitas at the Lovebox Festival in 2012.

Dev also released two more promotional singles through Twitter, "Poison" and "Call Me", both covers of Bell Biv DeVoe and Blondie, respectively. She also featured on French DJ David Guetta's album, Nothing but the Beat on a song called "I Just Wanna F" with Timbaland and Afrojack. Dev has also featured on a single by Swedish singer Eric Saade, "Hotter Than Fire", which was released on November 2, 2011, in Sweden. Dev was featured on a remix of Girls' Generation's song "Bad Girl" by the Cataracs, featured on their Japanese remix album and Dev was also featured on Timbaland's promotional single "Break Ya Back". The American version of The Night the Sun Came Up was released on March 26, 2012, in the United States, which includes new tracks compared to previous releases of the album. Dev teamed up with Spanish singer Enrique Iglesias on a track called "Naked", which was produced by the Cataracs and was released as the third single of the repackaged album. It reached the first position in Mexico and the second position in the US dance chart.

At the 2012 Lollapalooza, Dev revealed that she was currently working on her second album; "I'm using a lot more live instrumentation for this album", stating "I had such a great time making a very electronic-based album for the first one, but you know, I'm just moving to different things, different sounds, so we'll see." Her track "Bass Down Low" was featured during match intervals of volleyball, beach volleyball, and basketball, among others during the 2012 Summer Olympics. In 2013, Universal Republic announced that they were going defunct, all artists from the label moved to Republic Records. On November 1, she posted a new song on YouTube, "Kiss It" (featuring Sage the Gemini), produced by Hit-Boy. While "Kiss It" was released on December 17, 2013, a remix version was released that featured Casey Veggies in place of Sage the Gemini.

In November 2013, Dev also collaborated with Canadian singer Mia Martina for her single "Danse" which gained popularity in Latin and dance charts throughout spring 2014.

=== 2014–present: Bittersweet July, I Only See You When I'm Dreamin' and standalone singles ===
In mid-2014, after the release of her previous single "Kiss It", Dev left Universal Republic and decided to release music on her own, without a label. On May 5, 2014, Dev released an EP called Not All Love Songs Have to Be So Sad with NanosauR. The EP was released via iTunes on July 31, 2014. On August 7, 2014, Dev has posted a snippet of a new song on her Instagram account called "Kids" and revealed that Bittersweet July will be available for pre-order on August 11. It was released on September 23 by her own label, Rica Lyfe Records. On November 5, 2014, "Honey Dip" was confirmed as the first single from the EP, the video was directed by Oakland-based rapper Kreayshawn. On December 6, 2014, Dev announced the release of Bittersweet July, Pt. 2 as a follow up to Part 1 and made it available for pre-order along with the download of "The Night Is Young". The EP was released via iTunes on December 15. The third track from the second part, "Parade", was released as the lead single.

In 2015, Dev collaborated with female electro duo Nervo for their single "Hey Ricky". The single also features Kreayshawn, who directed the video. The video, released on Vevo on June 2, 2015, went viral, topping the real-time US chart. In December 2015, Dev was also featured as the lead vocalist on the club hit "Electric Walk" by electro house producer Nytrix. The song peaked at eight on the Billboard Dance Club Songs chart.

On January 25, 2016, Idolator posted a snippet of a song called "Lowkey" and wrote that on January 27, Ebro Darden would premiere Dev's standalone single on Beats 1. Dev worked mainly with her friend producer NanosauR, Dave Tozer, and Rey Reel. "Lowkey" was released on March 8, 2016. The song was praised by the critic and compared to Selena Gomez's "Good for You".

In February 2016, Dev was featured as the lead vocalist on "We Rock It" by Sander Kleinenberg. In August 2016, Dev signed with Barry Weiss' record label RECORDS and began promoting her album with the single "#1" (featuring Nef the Pharaoh), which reached the top 15 of the Billboard Rhythmic Songs chart.

In July 2017, Dev kicked off the campaign for her second album I Only See You When I'm Dreamin' with the release of two singles "All I Wanna Do" and "Come at Me" along with the pre-order of the album due September 8. Dev worked with collaborators such as Raye, MNDR, Sarah Hudson, and Marko Penn on the record.

From 2018, Dev began releasing standalone singles with "Rock on It", "Down for Me", "Girls Don't Lie", and "Clean Break" being released throughout 2018. She collaborated on the song "Make Out" by Da Candy and Ferry, released in September 2018. Beginning in July 2020, Dev started releasing a single every three weeks starting with "Mango" on July 17, "Follow My Lead" in August, and "Bom Dia" on September 1.

In July 2022, Dev performed at Lollapalooza and Hard stating that she was working on new music.

== Musical style ==
Dev's electro style and "sing-talk" vocal style have been compared to fellow pop singer Kesha. Dev responded to this, saying, "I'm confident enough in what I do that people will see me for who I am ... I get why people compare us but once people see me live they won't connect us as much." While comparing her to Kesha, Idolator wrote that "Dev's beats come off a bit more mellow and her songs a little bit more electro than pop." In response to being compared to both Kesha and Uffie, Dev said, "I just feel that I have a lot more to say and the ability to have an eclectic sound, I'm not bashing either artist, but I'm going to be able to give you a little bit more than what you've heard on those records. When my album comes out, hopefully I won't have to hear another reference or comparison." Much of Dev's music is inspired by rap music, as she believes that fans respond to "pop music but with rap roots". She said, "I've always been into hip-hop. Eminem changed my life when I was younger." The Hollywood Reporter compared her "futuristic" and "pulsing" sound to underground electroclash musicians Peaches and Yelle. Dev's musical genres have been cited as electro-crunk and electropop.

== Personal life ==
In September 2011, Dev publicly announced that she was expecting a baby girl due December 24, 2011. Dev gave birth to her daughter Emilia Lovely on December 9, 2011. MTV aired a special about Dev's life as a mom and how she is juggling being a mother and a performer at the same time. The special also shed light on her daughter, who was born with a condition called gastroschisis, and how her daughter overcame it.

== Discography ==
- The Night the Sun Came Up (2011)
- I Only See You When I'm Dreamin' (2017)

== Tours ==
Headlining

- The Night the Sun Came Up Tour (2012)

Date (2012)	City	Country	Venue
March 29	Los Angeles	United States	The Roxy
March 31	Las Vegas	United States	Caesars Palace
April 2	Scottsdale	United States	Martini Ranch
April 4	Boulder	United States	Fox Theater
April 5	Des Moines	United States	Wooly's
April 9	Toronto	Canada	Virgin Mobile Mod Club
April10	Montreal	Canada	Théâtre Corona
April 16	Cambridge	United States	The Middle East Downstairs
April 17	Philadelphia		Trocadero Theater
April 19	Washington, D.C.		Rock and Roll Hotel
April 20	Columbus		A&R Music Bar
April 21	Indianapolis		Butler University
April 26	York		York College of Pennsylvania
April 27	Morrisville		State University of New York at Morrisville
May 2	Allentown		Crocodile Rock Cafe
May 3	New York City		Element
May 4	New Haven		Toad's Place

- Bittersweet July Tour (2014–15)

Date (2014)	City	Country	Venue
May 5	Los Angeles	United States	Troubadour
May 6	San Luis Obispo	United States	SLO Brew
May 7	San Francisco	United States	DNA Lounge
May 8	Sacramento	United States	The Boardwalk
May 10	Portland	United States	Holocene
May 11	Seattle	United States	The Crocodile
May 13	Eugene	United States	Cozmic Pizza
May 14	Santa Cruz	United States	The Catalyst

- Bay Nights Tour (with Lil Debbie) (2019)

Opening Act

- The Fresh Meat Tour (with Jeffree Star) (2010–11)
- OMG Tour (with Usher) (2011)
- Digital Dancer Tour (with 6arelyhuman) (2025)

== Accolades ==
Dev has been nominated for two Billboard Music Awards, a Brit Award, and two MTV Video Music Awards.
