= Like a G6 =

2010 single by Far East Movement featuring the Cataracs and Dev

Single by Far East Movement featuring the Cataracs and Dev

from the album Free Wired
- Released: April 13, 2010
- Recorded: 2009
- Genre: Electro-hop
- Length: 3:38
- Label: Cherrytree; Interscope
- Songwriters: Jae Choung; James Roh; Kevin Nishimura; Virman Coquia; David Singer-Vine; Niles Holowell-Dhar
- Producer: The Cataracs

Far East Movement singles chronology
"Girls on the Dancefloor" (2010)	"Like a G6" (2010)	"Rocketeer" (2010)

The Cataracs singles chronology
"Club Love" (2010)	"Like a G6" (2010)	"Bass Down Low" (2010)

Dev singles chronology
"Like a G6" (2010)	"Bass Down Low" (2010)

Music video
- "Like a G6" on YouTube

"Like a G6" is a song by American music group Far East Movement featuring American production duo the Cataracs and American singer Dev, released on April 13, 2010 as the lead single from Far East Movement's third studio album Free Wired. The song was initially posted on November 4, 2009 on Far East Movement's YouTube page. An electro-hop club song, Dev sing-raps the song's hook and the verses are performed by Far East Movement.

"Like a G6" peaked at the top of the Billboard Hot 100 for three non-consecutive weeks, becoming the first single by Asian-American artists to do so and the first by any artists of East Asian origin since Kyu Sakamoto's 1963 single "Sukiyaki". Outside of the United States, "Like a G6" topped the chart in New Zealand, and peaked within the top ten of the charts in numerous countries, including Australia, Canada, Belgium, the Netherlands, Sweden, Switzerland, Slovakia, and the United Kingdom.

== Background ==
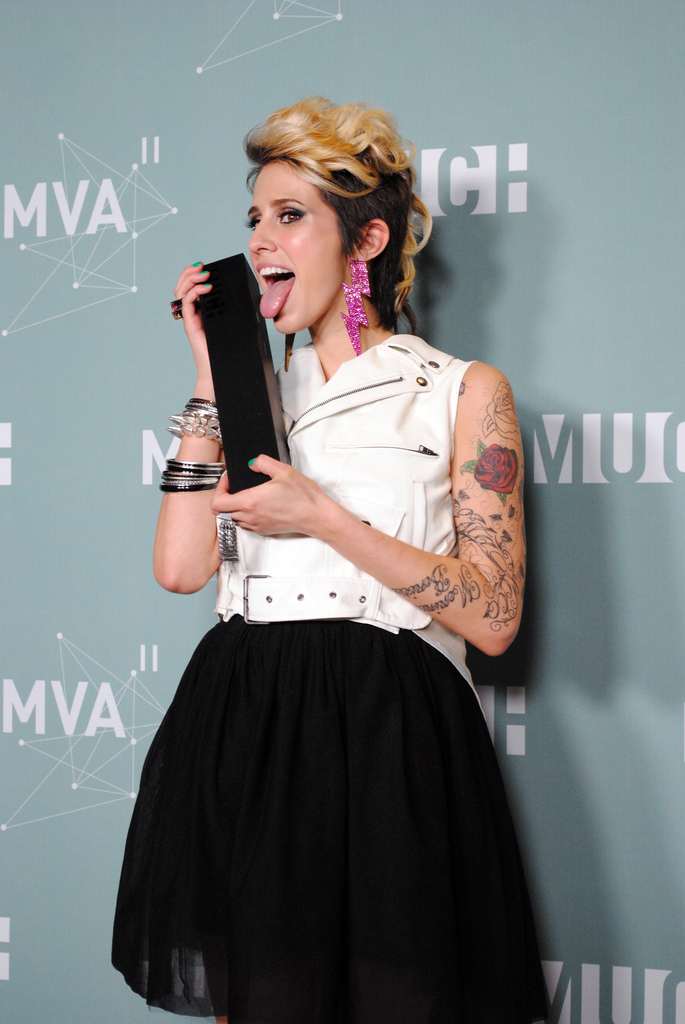
"Like a G6" samples Dev's "Booty Bounce", and as such she is credited as a featured artist.

Dev's vocals in "Like a G6" are sampled from her previous song "Booty Bounce", another song written and produced by the Cataracs. The "G6" in the song came about when the Cataracs were looking for a rhyme for the line "Sippin' sizzurp in my ride, like Three 6", a reference to the 2000 song "Sippin' on Some Syrup" by rap group Three 6 Mafia. They settled on "G6", meant to be a reference to the private airplane model Gulfstream IV, referred to as a "G4". The G4 had been name-checked in songs such as Drake's 2009 "Forever". A G6, they decided, was "flyer than a G4", according to Far East Movement member Kev Nish. The song has been incorrectly speculated to be about other things, including the Pontiac G6 and the Suunto G6 watch. When the song came out, the Gulfstream G650 model already existed, although the song's writers were not aware of this at the time. Since then, the Gulfstream G600 has also been announced.

== Reception ==
The song sold 4 million paid downloads in the US, according to Nielsen SoundScan in 2011.

Gulfstream Aerospace has stated that they were "thrilled" about the product reference.

== Music video ==
The music video, which was directed by Matt Alonzo, premiered on YouTube and Vevo on June 3, 2010. The line "sippin' sizzurp" and the word "slizzered" are censored on some channels. It follows a woman in a red dress (Erica Ocampo) picking up a friend from a restaurant and going to a liquor store, presumably in preparation for a party. A later scene shows the woman and her friends at the party, Colette Carr also make a cameo, Dev, the Cataracs and the members of Far East Movement can also be seen in this party scene. The final scene shows the members of Far East Movement getting on a Gulfstream IV the next morning.

== Charts ==
=== Weekly charts ===
Chart (2010–2011)	Peak position
Australia (ARIA)	2
Austria (Ö3 Austria Top 40)	8
Belgium (Ultratop 50 Flanders)	2
Belgium (Ultratop 50 Wallonia)	2
Brazil (Billboard Hot 100)	8
Brazil (Billboard Hot Pop Songs)	2
Canada Hot 100 (Billboard)	3
CIS Airplay (TopHit)	21
Czech Republic Airplay (ČNS IFPI)	21
Denmark (Tracklisten)	19
Europe (European Hot 100)	17
Finland (Suomen virallinen lista)	15
France (SNEP)	14
Germany (GfK)	15
Ireland (IRMA)	12
Netherlands (Dutch Top 40)	4
Netherlands (Single Top 100)	3
New Zealand (Recorded Music NZ)	1
Poland (Dance Top 50)	18
Russia Airplay (TopHit)	15
Scottish Singles Sales (Official Charts)	8
Slovakia Airplay (ČNS IFPI)	6
South Korea (Gaon)	31
Sweden (Sverigetopplistan)	7
Switzerland (Schweizer Hitparade)	10
UK Singles (Official Charts)	5
UK Hip Hop/R&B (Official Charts)	1
US Billboard Hot 100	1
US Dance Club Songs (Billboard)	3
US Hot R&B/Hip-Hop Songs (Billboard)	83
US Hot Rap Songs (Billboard)	3
US Pop Airplay (Billboard)	4
US Rhythmic Airplay (Billboard)	1

=== Year-end charts ===
Chart (2010)	Position
Australia (ARIA)	27
Belgium (Ultratop 50 Flanders)	69
Brazil (Crowley)	73
Canada (Canadian Hot 100)	35
Netherlands (Dutch Top 40)	51
Netherlands (Single Top 100)	46
New Zealand (RMNZ)	23
South Korea International (Gaon)	9
Sweden (Sverigetopplistan)	35
UK Singles (OCC)	63
US Billboard Hot 100	37
US Mainstream Top 40 (Billboard)	47
US Rhythmic (Billboard)	32

Chart (2011)	Position
Belgium (Ultratop 50 Flanders)	70
Brazil (Crowley)	21
Canada (Canadian Hot 100)	82
France (SNEP)	83
Russia Airplay (TopHit)	41
South Korea International (Gaon)	13
Sweden (Sverigetopplistan)	80
UK Singles (OCC)	121
US Billboard Hot 100	72
US Rhythmic (Billboard)	39

== Certifications ==
Region	Certification	Certified units/sales
Australia (ARIA)	3× Platinum	210,000^{^}
Belgium (BRMA)	Gold	15,000^{*}
Brazil (Pro-Música Brasil)	2× Platinum	120,000^{‡}
Canada (Music Canada)	4× Platinum	320,000^{‡}
Denmark (IFPI Danmark)	Platinum	90,000^{‡}
Germany (BVMI)	Platinum	300,000^{‡}
New Zealand (RMNZ)	4× Platinum	120,000^{‡}
Sweden (GLF)	Gold	20,000^{‡}
Switzerland (IFPI Switzerland)	Gold	15,000^{^}
United Kingdom (BPI)	2× Platinum	1,200,000^{‡}
United States (RIAA)	4× Platinum	4,000,000^{*}
^{*} Sales figures based on certification alone.^{^} Shipments figures based on certification alone.^{‡} Sales+streaming figures based on certification alone.

== Release history ==
Region	Date	Format	Version	Label	Ref.
United States	April 13, 2010	Digital download	Original	Cherrytree; Interscope	
United Kingdom	November 14, 2010	Digital download	Remixes	Cherrytree; Interscope	

== Covers and parodies ==
- Diddy – Dirty Money covered "Like a G6" as part of their set for BBC Radio 1's Live Lounge in the United Kingdom, alongside "Coming Home". The song then appeared on the sixth compilation of the Live Lounge.
- Connor Anderson made a parody of the song called "Roll a D6".
- Russian rapper Big Baby Tape released a remix of the song in December 2022.
- In 2024, Girl On Couch & Billen Ted's song "Man In Finance" ("G6 Trust Fund") uses the sample from "Like A G6", and David Guetta's version also uses this sample on the remix of Girl On Couch & Billen Ted "Man In Finance."

== See also ==
- List of songs recorded by Dev
- List of Billboard Hot 100 number ones of 2010
- List of UK R&B Singles Chart number ones of 2010
- List of number-one singles from the 2010s (New Zealand)
