= The Cataracs =

American hip hop group

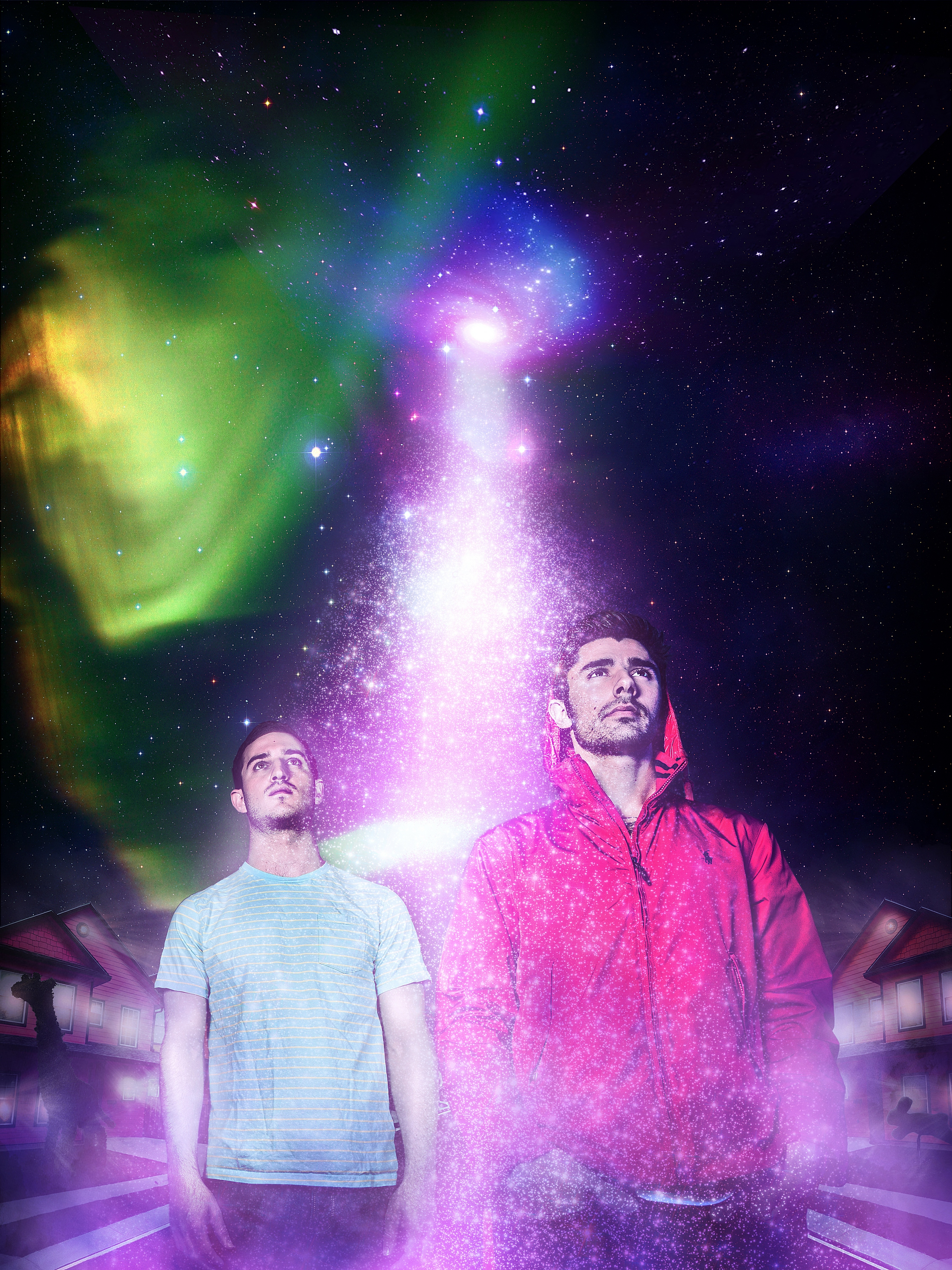
- The Cataracs in 2011

Background information
- Origin: Berkeley, California, U.S.
- Genres: Hip hop; synth-pop; hyphy; electronic; electro house
- Instruments: Vocals; keyboards; drums; guitar; synthesizer; programming
- Years active: 2003–2014, 2025–present
- Labels: Universal Republic; Republic; Indie-Pop; Spinnin'
- Members: David Benjamin Singer-Vine (Campa); Niles Hollowell-Dhar (Cyrano)
- Website: thecataracs.com

The Cataracs are an American hip hop record production project and duo formed in Berkeley, California, consisting of David "Campa" Benjamin Singer-Vine (born March 9, 1988) and Niles "Cyrano" Hollowell-Dhar (born October 6, 1988). The duo started out as an independent group, during their years at Berkeley High School. The two were first signed to the label Indie-Pop. Singer-Vine left the group in August 2012 with Hollowell-Dhar continuing on with the name The Cataracs by himself. Hollowell-Dhar also released materials starting in 2014, under the name of Kshmr.

== Biography ==
=== Early days ===
The duo met in their second year attending Berkeley High School. Singer-Vine was featured in a rap CD that was being passed around campus. When Hollowell-Dhar eventually heard the CD, he subsequently created a response. However, the "diss" response brought the two together and they soon became friends. In 2003, the two joined to create what is now The Cataracs (named after the phrase "Who smoke 'til your eyes get cataracts" from Snoop Dogg's song "What's My Name Pt. 2"). In the summer of 2006, they released their first album, Technohop Vol. 1. In August 2006, the group joined with The Pack to make the single "Blueberry Afghani". The song soon became a hit and was chosen as a "Download of the Week" by 106 KMEL and many music sites such as The Fader, UK's Hip Hop Connection and XLR8R praised it.

Singer-Vine attended Columbia College Chicago. Hollowell-Dhar is also a member of Pi Kappa Phi fraternity at San Francisco State University. But in order to pursue their dreams and career in music, they both decided that they would have to leave school. The duo then packed their bags and moved to Los Angeles where they began working on their music full-time, creating songs like "Club Love" and "Baby Baby", the latter which went on to be featured on the hit reality series Keeping Up with the Kardashians in early 2010. By 2007, they released their second album, Technohop Vol. 2, and in 2008 they released their third album, The 13th Grade.

=== Rise to fame ===
In their new location, they discovered Manteca native Dev, a singer who posted much of her work on Myspace. Dhar asked if she would like to sing for them, which led to the song "2Nite." The Cataracs, along with Dev, signed to the Indie-Pop label, which also features musicians such as Young L. They were later signed to a major label, Universal. Through Universal, they began producing music for artists such as Far East Movement and Glasses Malone. As artists, The Cataracs received recognition through their 2010 single "Club Love", which received air play at clubs and on many different radio stations. Despite such accomplishments, the Cataracs have had their most mainstream success with the song "Like a G6" which was written by Singer-Vine/Dhar and produced by Dhar, and also went on to peak at #1 on the Billboard charts. The chorus for the song is sampled from lyrics in the song "Booty Bounce" by Dev, which they also produced. They were featured on two of Shwayze's songs on his 2010 mixtape Love Stoned. The duo also produced songs for albums such as The Pack's new album, Wolfpack Party.

In early December 2010, they collaborated with Snoop Dogg on the song "Wet". It became the lead single for his 2011 album Doggumentary. They produced "Kick Us Out" for pop trio Hyper Crush. In an attempt to bolster their fanbase, and get people more acquainted with who they are, they released Gordo Taqueria. This will serve as a 2012 EP leading up to their major debut release in the near future. Unlike much of their previous work, this album excludes samples or appearances from labelmate Dev.

=== Singer-Vine's departure ===
On August 23, 2012, Hollowell-Dhar informed on the Cataracs Facebook page that Singer-Vine had left the group. The note goes on to say that "The Cataracs, as of 2 weeks ago, have taken a new form. David informed us of a pretty big decision: the decision to follow his heart and put music down." Hollowell-Dhar went on to produce solely while keeping the name The Cataracs. The first show without Singer-Vine took place on August 25 at Cornell University. In 2016, Singer-Vine (under the name Campa) and Felix Snow formed Terror Jr with a lead singer that goes by the alias Lisa.

=== 2012–14: Hiatus and Hollowell-Dhar's transition into KSHMR ===
In late 2012, Hollowell-Dhar, continuing under the name The Cataracs, released songs produced by himself and collaborating with artists such as Martin Solveig, Trevor Simpson, and Borgeous. He primarily focused on his EDM output, while still occasionally doing vocals in songs like "Big Dipper" featuring Luciana, "Ready For The Weekend" featuring Icona Pop, and "Alcohol (Remix)" featuring Sky Blu of LMFAO.

Early in 2013, The Cataracs released two music videos on Vevo: "Alcohol (Remix)" featuring Sky Blu, and "Missed U 2" featuring Petros. The latter was the first Cataracs video not to have vocals by Hollowell-Dhar. Also in 2013, The Cataracs collaborated with Martin Solveig on "Hey Now", and produced the song "Slow Down" for Selena Gomez's debut album Stars Dance.

In 2014, Hollowell-Dhar began releasing music under the name Kshmr, beginning with the song "Megalodon", though he did not reveal his real identity until the following year.

=== 2025–present: Reunion ===
In late 2024, The Cataracs generated significant anticipation among their fanbase by hinting at a potential reunion through their official Twitter account. These teasers also suggested the possibility of a collaboration with DEV, their frequent collaborator and featured vocalist on several of their most notable tracks. On February 4, 2025, The Cataracs formally announced their reunion, confirming their return to the music industry. The announcement was followed on February 5, 2025, by a teaser for an upcoming new song, signaling the beginning of a new chapter for the duo. On February 21, they released their first single in 14 years titled "Make Ya Body Whistle", to a generally positive reception from fans, many of whom attributed the track as part of the "recession pop" trend of the 2020s.

== Tours ==
- The One Night Stand Tour (2008)

Date (2008)	City	Country	Venue
October 1	San Francisco	United States	
October 2	Eugene	United States	Unknown
October 4	Seattle	United States	
October 8	Davis	United States	
October 9	Santa Cruz	United States	
October 11	Reno	United States	
October 16	Sacramento		
October 17	Berkeley		
