= 2011 in hip-hop =

This article summarizes the events, album releases, and album release dates in hip-hop for the year 2011.

== Events ==
=== January ===
- Shady Records signs Slaughterhouse and Yelawolf.
- Decon Records signs Roc Marciano.

=== February ===
- For the rap categories of the 2011 Grammy Awards, Eminem wins two Grammy Awards for Best Rap Solo Performance and Best Rap Album while Jay-Z wins Best Rap/Sung Collaboration, Best Rap Performance by a Duo or a Group, and Best Rap Song.
- Eminem pairs up with auto manufacturer Chrysler to star in a two-minute-long advertisement that aired during the 2011 Super Bowl, which was hailed by critics as being "authentic" and "rousing", and which is reported to have contributed to the boost in Chrysler's first quarter profits.

=== March ===
- Singer Nate Dogg dies on March 15, 2011.
- Lasers by Lupe Fiasco debuts at number one on the Billboard 200, selling 204,000 copies its first week. It is the first rap album to debut at number one on the Billboard 200 in 2011.

=== April ===
- Detroit rapper Fuzz Scoota joins the rap group D12.
- Krayzie Bone splits from Bone Thugs-N-Harmony.
- The scheduled May 16 release of Lil Wayne's Tha Carter IV is delayed.
- Dr. Dre awarded 100% of the digital royalties from his first album The Chronic in a lawsuit from Death Row Records.
- Lil B names his new album I'm Gay, sparking controversy and death threats.

=== May ===
- M-Bone of Cali Swag District dies from multiple gun wounds in front of the liquor store in Inglewood, California.
- ”Macho Man” Randy Savage dies of a heart attack brought on by atherosclerosis in Seminole, Florida.

=== June ===
- Lupe Fiasco stirs controversy, calling United States President Barack Obama "the biggest terrorist in America".
- Fat Joe drastically slims down 88 pounds, currently weighing 265 pounds, in reaction to the death of seven of his friends due to obesity.
- Ja Rule begins his two-year prison sentence for gun charges stemming from a 2007 arrest in New York City.
- The late Tupac Shakur's 40th birthday celebrated on June 16 at a venue in Atlanta, hosted by his mother, Afeni Shakur and comedian Mike Epps. Notable performing acts included Erykah Badu and Rick Ross, among others.
- The manhunt for hip-hop record executive James "Jimmy Henchman" Rosemond ends with his arrest by US Marshals and DEA agents in NY City and a subsequent charge for heading a cocaine trafficking ring.
- It is revealed that Missy Elliott is suffering from Graves' disease.
- 2Pac's Greatest Hits album is certified diamond by the RIAA.
- Bad Meets Evil's Hell: The Sequel becomes the first group album to debut at #1 on Billboard 200, but the second hip hop act to have a #1 album in 2011.
- Shawty Lo signs a deal with 50 Cent's G-Unit Records.

=== July ===
- DMX is released from prison.
- Wiz Khalifa's Rolling Papers is the first rap album to be certified gold in 2011.
- A Tribe Called Quest's documentary film is released in the United States, amid a much-publicized disagreement over the film's vision between Q-Tip and director Michael Rapaport.

=== August ===
- Forbes publishes Hip Hop Cash Kings 2011, placing Jay-Z first ($37 million), followed by Diddy ($35 million). The rest follow as Kanye West ($16 Million), Lil Wayne ($15 Million), Birdman ($15 million), Snoop Dogg ($14 million) Eminem ($14 million), Wiz Khalifa ($11 million) Nicki Minaj ($6.5 million) and B.o.B ($5 million).
- Brooklyn rapper Kampane is found dead in a suspected homicide.
- Kanye West and Jay-Z's Watch the Throne becomes the fastest-selling rap album in 2011, selling 436,000 copies its first week, beating Lupe Fiasco's third studio album Lasers. It is also the third rap album to debut at number one on the Billboard 200.
- Rolling Stone names Eminem "the King of Hip Hop".
- Lil Wayne rushed to a hospital in St. Louis from a skateboarding incident, suffering a wound over his eye.
- In response to West and Jay-Z's single "H•A•M", Lil Wayne fires back at Jay-Z in his song "It's Good" regarding "Baby's Money". One of the collaborators on the track Jadakiss denies involvement in the beef. Lil Wayne states there would not be any repercussions. Drake, the other collaborator, was unaware of the beef at the time of recording.
- Rapper Royce da 5'9" releases fifth and final independent album Success Is Certain which debuts at #25 on the US Billboard Hot 200.
- T.I. is released from prison.

=== September ===
- Watch the Throne is certified platinum by the Recording Industry Association of America.
- Pusha T of the Clipse signs a solo record deal with Def Jam Records.
- Lil Wayne's Tha Carter IV sells 965,000 copies its first week, making it the fastest-selling rap album and the overall second-fastest-selling album of the year. It also becomes the fifth rap album to debut at #1 on the Billboard 200. He also has 12 singles appear on the Billboard Hot 100 in the first week of September.
- T.I. was brought back to prison due to conducting business with VH1 reality show producers for his upcoming reality show, delaying his release date to late September. Later, T.I. was released to a halfway house to complete his sentence.
- Ray J and Fabolous were involved in an altercation with each other in Las Vegas, where the match between Floyd Mayweather and Victor Ortiz occurred.
- Lil Wayne announced his intent to record two more Tha Carter albums, a joint album with Juelz Santana, and a second Young Money compilation album.

=== October ===
- J. Cole's debut album Cole World: The Sideline Story sells 218,000 copies in its first week, charting at number one on the Billboard 200.
- Rick Ross has suffered two seizures while traveling to cities to perform.
- It is reported that Lil Wayne is recording sequels to I Am Not a Human Being and Rebirth.
- Kanye West announces that a GOOD Music compilation album will be released sometime in spring 2012.
- Rapper/Model Lola Monroe signs onto Wiz Khalifa's label Taylor Gang.

=== November ===
- Brick Squad Monopoly affiliate RoseMo700 is gunned down in Los Angeles on November 3 while on his way home at the age of 26.
- Legendary rapper Heavy D dies at his home in Beverly Hills, California.
- Pitbull files a countersuit against Lindsay Lohan citing her multiple prison sentences lead to the credibility of the reference and her ineligibility to file her lawsuit in New York, being a California resident.
- Erick Sermon suffers a heart attack.
- Juicy J of Three 6 Mafia signs a solo deal with Wiz Khalifa's Taylor Gang Records.
- Take Care sold 630.000 in this debut week, being the second #1 album of Drake, and the third fastest selling album of 2011 (behind Lady Gaga and Lil Wayne).

=== December ===
- Strange Music signs Prozak.
- 1017 Brick Squad affiliate Slim Dunkin is shot and killed in an Atlanta studio.
- Waka Flocka Flame's second studio album Triple F Life: Friends, Fans and Family is pushed to a 2012 release date because of the death of Slim Dunkin.

== Released albums ==
| Release Date | Artist | Album | Notes | Refs |
|---|---|---|---|---|
| January 1 | G-Side | The One...Cohesive | | |
| January 11 | DJ Vlad Presents... M-Eighty | Taking Back What's Mine: The Official Compilation Album | | |
| January 11 | Freeway & Statik Selektah | Statik-Free EP | | |
| January 11 | The Jacka | Flight Risk | | |
| January 11 | Lecrae | Rehab: The Overdose | Debuted at No. 15 on the Billboard 200 | |
| January 11 | Schoolboy Q | Setbacks | Debuted at No. 100 on the Billboard 200 | |
| January 11 | Philthy Rich | Trip'n 4 Life | | |
| January 11 | Shunda K | The Most Wanted | | |
| January 11 | Turf Talk | Turf Sinatra | | |
| January 11 | Verbal Kent | Save Yourself | | |
| January 18 | Andre Nickatina & The Jacka | My Middle Name Is Crime EP (Physical Release) | | |
| January 18 | Yukmouth & DJ Fresh | Thuggin And Mobbin | | |
| January 18 | Keak da Sneak, P.S.D. Tha Drivah & Messy Marv | Da Bidness Part II | | |
| January 18 | Madlib | Madlib Medicine Show No. 11: Low Budget High Fi Music | | |
| January 18 | Mistah F.A.B., DJ Rah2k & The Empire | I Found My Backpack | | |
| January 18 | Lil B | Angels Exodus | | |
| January 18 | Kottonmouth Kings Present... X Pistols | Shoot To Kill | | |
| January 18 | Sha Stimuli | Unsung Vol. 1: The Garden of Eden | | |
| January 18 | Playalitical | AmeriCon | | |
| January 25 | Talib Kweli | Gutter Rainbows | Debuted at No. 29 on the Billboard 200 | |
| January 25 | Sam Sneed | Street Scholars | | |
| January 25 | Layzie Bone | Thug Luv | | |
| January 25 | Paul Wall | Politics As Usual | | |
| January 25 | Trackademicks | State Of The Arts | | |
| January 25 | The Jacka Presents... Joe Blow | You Should Be Payin Me: Street Album | | |
| January 25 | Late Presents... Final Penalty | The Pay Scale | | |
| January 25 | Tech N9ne & DJ Whoo Kid | Bad Season (Reissue) | Debuted at No. 118 on the Billboard 200 | |
| January 25 | Blaqstarr | The Divine EP | | |
| February 1 | Ayatollah | Fingertips | | |
| February 1 | Deltron 3030 | Deltron 3030 (Reissue) (Vinyl Release) | | |
| February 1 | The Lost Children of Babylon Present... Atma | Beyond Birth And Death | | |
| February 1 | Random & Lost Perception | Black Materia: Final Fantasy VII | | |
| February 1 | The Insane Warrior | We Are Doorways | | |
| February 1 | Skepta | Doin' It Again (International Release) | | |
| February 1 | Trae | Traebute: Side 2 | | |
| February 8 | Big K.R.I.T. & Grillade | The Wuz Here Sessions | | |
| February 8 | Count Bass D & DJ Pocket | In The Loop Partie Deux | | |
| February 8 | Danny Brown | The Hybrid (Deluxe Edition) | | |
| February 8 | Hell Rell & J.R. Writer | Gun Clap | | |
| February 8 | L.B.C. Crew | Haven't You Heard... | | |
| February 8 | Lord Superb | Perb Made It Possible | | |
| February 8 | MC Magic | The Rewire | | |
| February 8 | Rasco | Next Stop: Seattle | | |
| February 8 | Slaughterhouse | Slaughterhouse EP | Debuted at No. 147 on the Billboard 200 | |
| February 8 | Wise Intelligent | The UnConKable Djezuz Djonez | | |
| February 15 | 40 Glocc & DJ Nik Bean | C.O.P.S. (Cripping On Public Streets) | | |
| February 15 | Beans | End It All | | |
| February 15 | Blu | Amnesia | | |
| February 15 | East Coast Avengers Present... DC The Midi Alien | Avengers Airwaves | | |
| February 15 | Frank Nitt | Jewels In My Backpack | | |
| February 15 | Keak da Sneak and DJ Fresh | Sneakacydal Returns | | |
| February 15 | King Gordy | King Gordy Sings The Blues | | |
| February 15 | KRS-One and Showbiz | Godsville | | |
| February 15 | Lil' Kim | Black Friday: The Mixtape | | |
| February 15 | Madchild | Banned From America | | |
| February 15 | MF Doom | Special Herbs: The Box Set Vol. 0–9 (Box Set) (Vinyl Release) | | |
| February 15 | Saigon | The Greatest Story Never Told | Debuted at No. 61 on the Billboard 200 | |
| February 15 | Sims & Lazerbeak | Bad Time Zoo | | |
| February 15 | Torae | Heart Failure | | |
| February 15 | Torch | UFO | | |
| February 22 | Apollo Brown | Clouds | | |
| February 22 | Bizzy Bone | Mr. Ouija | | |
| February 22 | Joell Ortiz | Free Agent | Debuted at No. 173 on the Billboard 200 | |
| February 22 | Layzie Bone | The Definition | | |
| February 22 | Layzie Bone | The Meaning | | |
| February 22 | Strong Arm Steady | Arms & Hammers | | |
| February 22 | Swifty McVay | HellToTellTheCaptain LP | | |
| February 22 | T.I. | No Mercy (Vinyl Release) | | |
| March 1 | Doap Nixon | Gray Poupon | | |
| March 1 | J-Love | Egotistical Maniac | | |
| March 1 | Pastor Troy | Still Troy | | |
| March 1 | Shad | iTunes Session | | |
| March 8 | Death Grips | Death Grips | | |
| March 8 | DMX | Greatest Hits With A Twist | | |
| March 8 | Esoteric | Boston Pharaoh | | |
| March 8 | Lil Jon and The East Side Boyz | Crunkest Hits | | |
| March 8 | Lupe Fiasco | Lasers | Debuted at No. 1 on the Billboard 200; Singles: "The Show Goes On","Words I Never Said", and "Out of My Head"; Certified Gold | |
| March 8 | Mac Lethal | Fast As Hell Though EP | | |
| March 8 | Mr. Capone-E & Mr. Criminal | South Side's Most Wanted | | |
| March 8 | Raekwon | Shaolin vs. Wu-Tang | Debuted at No. 12 on the Billboard 200 | |
| March 8 | Reks | R.E.K.S. (Rhythmatic Eternal King Supreme) | | |
| March 8 | Three Times Dope | The Sequel (Reissue) | | |
| March 8 | WC | Revenge of the Barracuda | | |
| March 15 | Action Bronson | Dr. Lecter | | |
| March 15 | AP.9 | Relentless | | |
| March 15 | Beneficence | Sidewalk Science | | |
| March 15 | Decon Records | Closed Sessions: ATX | | |
| March 15 | Keak da Sneak | The Best of Thizz Iz All N da Doe | | |
| March 15 | Lil' Keke | Ridin' Wit Da Top Off Volume 1 | | |
| March 15 | The Boy Boy Young Mess Presents... Various Artists | Paper Bag Money | | |
| March 15 | Planet Asia | The Bar Mitzvah | | |
| March 15 | Rappin' 4-Tay | Still Standing | | |
| March 15 | Roc Marciano | Marcberg (Vinyl Release) | | |
| March 15 | Techniec and L's | The Blacklist | | |
| March 22 | Baby Bash | Bashtown | | |
| March 22 | Crooked I | Million Dollar Story EP | | |
| March 22 | CunninLynguists | Oneirology | | |
| March 22 | Gucci Mane | The Return of Mr. Zone 6 | Debuted at No. 18 on the Billboard 200 | |
| March 22 | Kool Moe Dee | Kool Moe Dee (Reissue) | | |
| March 22 | Pharoahe Monch | W.A.R. (We Are Renegades) | Debuted at No. 55 on the Billboard 200 | |
| March 22 | Zion I & The Grouch | Heroes In The Healing of the Nation | | |
| March 29 | 40 Glocc, Spider Loc & DJ Drama | Graveyard Shift | | |
| March 29 | DJ Spinna & Mr. Thing | The Beat Generation (10th Anniversary Collection) | | |
| March 29 | E-40 | Revenue Retrievin': Graveyard Shift | Debuted at No. 40 on the Billboard 200 | |
| March 29 | E-40 | Revenue Retrievin': Overtime Shift | Debuted at No. 42 on the Billboard 200 | |
| March 29 | Lee Bannon | Bannon's BigToyBox II: Circus Cuts | | |
| March 29 | Mac Miller | On And On And Beyond | Debuted at No. 55 on the Billboard 200 | |
| March 29 | Max B | Vigilante Season | Debuted at No. 200 on the Billboard 200 | |
| March 29 | Noah23 | Fry Cook on Venus | | |
| March 29 | Snoop Dogg | Doggumentary | Debuted at No. 8 on the Billboard 200; Singles included "Wet", "Boom" | |
| March 29 | Wiz Khalifa | Rolling Papers | Debuted at No. 2 on the Billboard 200; Singles: "Black and Yellow", "Roll Up", "No Sleep", "On My Level"; Certified Gold | |
| April 5 | Ab-Soul | Longterm Mentality | | |
| April 5 | Bizzy Bone & Layzie Bone | Bone Brothers IV | | |
| April 5 | Blueprint | Adventures in Counter-Culture | | |
| April 5 | Brotha Lynch Hung | Coathanga Strangla | Debuted at No. 68 on the Billboard 200 | |
| April 5 | Heavy Metal Kings | Heavy Metal Kings | | |
| April 5 | Jim Jones | Capo | Debuted at No. 20 on the Billboard 200 | |
| April 5 | Kool Keith | The Legend of Tashan Dorrsett | | |
| April 5 | Mac Lethal | North Korean BBQ | | |
| April 5 | Mr. Cheeks Presents... The Lost Boyz Mafia | The Lost Boyz Mafia (Revolver Edition) | | |
| April 5 | Pastor Troy | H.N.I.C. | | |
| April 5 | Rapper Big Pooh | Fat Boy Fresh Volume One: For Members Only | | |
| April 5 | Snowgoons Presents... Savage Brothers & Lord Lhus | The Iron Fist | | |
| April 5 | Sunspot Jonz | Galaxy Of Dreams | | |
| April 12 | 9th Prince | Salute The General EP | | |
| April 12 | Atmosphere | The Family Sign | Debuted at No. 13 on the Billboard 200 | |
| April 12 | Classified | Hand Shakes & Middle Fingers | Debuted at No. 7 on the Canadian Albums Chart | |
| April 12 | Dreddy Kruger Presents... Think Differently Music | Wu-Tang Meets The Indie Culture: The Lost Files | | |
| April 12 | J. Rocc | Some Cold Rock Stuf | | |
| April 12 | Mack 10 & Malone | Money Music | | |
| April 12 | Moka Only | Airport 5 | | |
| April 12 | stic.man | The Workout | | |
| April 12 | Swollen Members | Dagger Mouth | Debuted at No. 15 on the Canadian Albums Chart | |
| April 19 | Berner | The White Album | | |
| April 19 | Blu | Her Favorite Colo(u)r (Reissue) | | |
| April 19 | Cam'ron & Vado | Gunz n' Butta | Debuted at No. 78 on the Billboard 200 | |
| April 19 | Coalmine Records | Can You Dig It? | | |
| April 19 | Coughee Brothaz | Fresh Brew | | |
| April 19 | Damu the Fudgemunk | How It Should Sound Volume 1 & 2 (Physical Release) | | |
| April 19 | Daz Dillinger | D.A.Z. | | |
| April 19 | Del the Funky Homosapien | Golden Era Triple Pack | | |
| April 19 | DJ Quik | The Book of David | Debuted at No. 55 on the Billboard 200 | |
| April 19 | !llmind | Behind The Curtain | | |
| April 19 | Spice 1 | Spice N Erbzz | | |
| April 20 | Kottonmouth Kings | Legalize it | | |
| April 26 | Bambu | ...Exact Change... (Reloaded) | | |
| April 26 | Blue Sky Black Death | Noir | | |
| April 26 | Big Hutch | Only God Can Judge Me | | |
| May 3 | Beastie Boys | Hot Sauce Committee Part Two | Debuted at No. 2 on the Billboard 200 | |
| May 3 | Big Scoob | Damn Fool | | |
| May 3 | Blitz the Ambassador | Native Sun | | |
| May 3 | The Jacka | We Mafia | | |
| May 10 | The Lonely Island | Turtleneck & Chain | Debuted at No. 3 on the Billboard 200 | |
| May 10 | Messy Marv Presents... Various Artists | Goon Vitamins Vol. 1 | | |
| May 10 | Pete Rock | PeteStrumentals (10th Anniversary Edition) | | |
| May 10 | Tyler, The Creator | Goblin | Debuted at No. 5 on the Billboard 200 | |
| May 10 | Saul Williams | Volcanic Sunlight | | |
| May 13 | Bushido | Jenseits von Gut und Böse | Debuted at No. 1 on the German Media Control Charts, No. 1 on the Austrian charts, No. 1 on the Swiss charts | |
| May 17 | Edo G | A Face In The Crowd | | |
| May 17 | J. Rawls | The Hip-Hop Effect | | |
| May 17 | Killer Mike | PL3DGE | Debuted at No. 115 on the Billboard 200 | |
| May 17 | Krizz Kaliko | S.I.C. | | |
| May 17 | Messy Marv | Shooting Range 3 | | |
| May 17 | Mr. Capone-E & Mr. Criminal | Video Bangers 2 | | |
| May 17 | Neek The Exotic & Large Professor | Still On The Hustle | | |
| May 17 | New Boyz | Too Cool to Care | Debuted at No. 41 on the Billboard 200; Singles include "Break My Bank", "Backseat", and "Better With the Lights Off" | |
| May 17 | Rappin' 4-Tay | Still Standing | | |
| May 17 | Tinie Tempah | Disc-Overy (U.S. Release) | Debuted at No. 21 on the Billboard 200; Singles include "Written in the Stars", and "Til I'm Gone" | |
| May 17 | X-Raided | Unforgiven Volume 3: Vindication | | |
| May 17 | Whodini | Escape (Reissue) | | |
| May 23 | Maybach Music Group | Self Made Vol. 1 | Debuted at No. 5 on the Billboard 200 | |
| May 31 | Big L | The Danger Zone | | |
| May 31 | Kool G Rap | Riches, Royalty, Respect | | |
| May 31 | Madlib & Frank Nitt | Medicine Show #9: Channel 85 Presents Nittyville | | |
| May 31 | Tedashii | BlackLight | Debuted at No. 63 on the Billboard 200 | |
| May 31 | The Undergods (Canibus & Keith Murray) | In Gods We Trust: Crush Microphones To Dust | | |
| May 31 | Vast Aire | OX 2010 Odyssey | | |
| June 7 | Big K.R.I.T. | R4: The Prequel | | |
| June 7 | Hail Mary Mallon | Are You Gonna Eat That? | | |
| June 7 | Tech N9ne | All 6's And 7's | Debuted at No. 4 on the Billboard 200 | |
| June 7 | Count Bass D & Insight | The Risktakers | | |
| June 14 | Bad Meets Evil | Hell: The Sequel | Debuted at No. 1 on the Billboard 200; Singles: "Fast Lane", "Lighters"; Certified Gold | |
| June 14 | Bumpy Knuckles & Statik Selektah | Lyrical Workout | | |
| June 14 | Gorilla Zoe | King Kong | Debuted at No. 56 on the Billboard 200 | |
| June 14 | Random Axe | Random Axe | | |
| June 21 | Casual | The Hierophant | | |
| June 21 | Blaq Poet | Blaq Poet Society | | |
| June 21 | Grieves | Together/Apart | | |
| June 21 | Messy Marv | Kontraband | | |
| June 21 | Pitbull | Planet Pit | Debuted at No. 7 on the Billboard 200; Singles included "Hey Baby (Drop It to the Floor)", "Give Me Everything", "Rain Over Me", "International Love"; Certified Gold | |
| June 21 | Potluck | Rhymes And Resin | | |
| June 23 | Noah23 | Vision & Voice | | |
| June 24 | Freddie Gibbs & Statik Selektah | Lord Giveth, Lord Taketh Away | | |
| June 24 | Canibus | Lyrical Law | | |
| June 25 | Noah23 | Pirate Utopias (77 Lost Scrolls) | | |
| June 28 | Big Sean | Finally Famous | Debuted at No. 3 on the Billboard 200; Singles: "My Last", "Marvin Gaye & Chardonnay", "Dance (Ass)" | |
| June 28 | Currensy | Weekend At Burnie's | Debuted at No. 22 on the Billboard 200 | |
| June 28 | Pete Rock & Smif-n-Wessun | Monumental | Debuted at No. 102 on the Billboard 200 | |
| June 28 | Dom Kennedy | From the Westside With Love 2 | | |
| June 28 | Shabazz Palaces | Black Up | | |
| July 2 | Kendrick Lamar | Section.80 | Debuted at No. 104 on the Billboard 200 | |
| July 5 | A-Plus | Pepper Spray | | |
| July 5 | Qwazaar & Batsauce | Style Be The King | | |
| July 5 | Vakill | Armor Of God | | |
| July 12 | Mistah F.A.B. | The Grind Is A Terrible Thing To Waste, Part 2 | | |
| July 12 | Cali Swag District | The Kickback | | |
| July 12 | Crooked I | Planet C.O.B. | | |
| July 12 | MellowHype | BlackenedWhite | | |
| July 12 | Jon Connor | Salvation | | |
| July 12 | Mr. Capone-E | Tears Of A Soldier | | |
| July 12 | Pimp C | Still Pimping | Debuted at No. 72 on the Billboard 200 | |
| July 12 | The Cool Kids | When Fish Ride Bicycles | | |
| July 12 | Trae Tha Truth | Street King | | |
| July 19 | DJ Khaled | We the Best Forever | Debuted at No. 5 on the Billboard 200; Singles: "Welcome to the Hood", "I'm on One" | |
| July 19 | Project Pat | Loud Pack | | |
| July 19 | Roc Marciano & Gangrene | Greneberg | | |
| July 19 | San Quinn | Can't Take The Ghetto Out a Nigga | | |
| July 26 | Black Rob | Game Tested, Streets Approved | | |
| July 26 | Jay Rock | Follow Me Home | Debuted at No. 83 on the Billboard 200 | |
| July 26 | Thi'sl | Beautiful Monster | | |
| July 26 | Wu-Tang Clan | Legendary Weapons | Debuted at No. 38 on the Billboard 200 | |
| July 28 | One Be Lo | Laborhood Part 1 | | |
| August 1 | B.G. Knocc Out | Eazy-E's Protege | | |
| August 2 | Mann | Mann's World | | |
| August 2 | Swollen Members | Monsters II | | |
| August 8 | Jay-Z & Kanye West | Watch the Throne | Debuted at number one on the Billboard 200; Singles: "H•A•M•", "Otis", "Niggas in Paris", "Gotta Have It"; Certified Platinum | |
| August 9 | Ace Hood | Blood, Sweat & Tears | Debuted at No. 8 on the Billboard 200; Singles: "Hustle Hard", "Go N Get It", "Body 2 Body" | |
| August 9 | Gucci Mane & Waka Flocka Flame | Ferrari Boyz | Debuted at No. 21 on the Billboard 200 | |
| August 9 | Kutt Calhoun | Red-Headed Stepchild | | |
| August 9 | Royce da 5'9" | Success Is Certain | Debuted at No. 25 on the Billboard 200; Singles: "Writer's Block", "Second Place", "Legendary" | |
| August 9 | Ski Beatz | 24 Hour Karate School 2 | | |
| August 16 | Richie Rich | Town Bidness Volume 2 | | |
| August 16 | Slaine | A World With No Skies 2.0 | | |
| August 19 | One Be Lo | Laborhood Part 2 | | |
| August 23 | Los Rakas | Chancletas y Camisetas Bordada | | |
| August 23 | Apathy | Honkey Kong | | |
| August 23 | Game | The R.E.D. Album | Debuted at No. 1 on the Billboard 200; Singles: "Red Nation", "Pot of Gold" | |
| August 23 | OuterSpace | My Brother's Keeper | | |
| August 23 | The Boy Boy Young Mess | Kocaine Ballads Frum My S550 | | |
| August 29 | Lil Wayne | Tha Carter IV | Debuted at No. 1 on the Billboard 200; Singles: "6 Foot 7 Foot", "John", "How to Love", "She Will"; Certified Platinum | |
| August 30 | Psalm One | Get In The Van 3 | | |
| August 30 | Vanilla Ice | W.T.F. (Wisdom, Tenacity and Focus) | | |
| August 30 | Blu | J e s u s | | |
| August 30 | Braille | Native Lungs | | |
| August 30 | Glasses Malone | Beach Cruiser | Debuted at No. 165 on the Billboard 200 | |
| August 30 | Skyzoo | The Great Debater | | |
| August 30 | Slim Thug Presents... Boss Hogg Outlawz | Serve & Collect 3 | | |
| August 30 | Soopafly | Best Kept Secret | | |
| August 30 | Timbo King | From Babylon To T1mbuk2 | | |
| August 30 | Smoke DZA | Rolling Stoned | | |
| September 6 | Oddisee | Rock Creek Park | | |
| September 6 | One Be Lo | L.A.B.O.R. | | |
| September 7 | Noah23 & Krem | The Terminal Illness EP | | |
| September 13 | Qwazaar & Batsauce | Bat Meets Blaine | | |
| September 13 | Hopie | Raw Gems | | |
| September 13 | Bronze Nazareth | School for the Blindman | | |
| September 13 | Da' T.R.U.T.H. | The Whole Truth | Debuted at No. 109 on the Billboard 200 | |
| September 13 | Flesh-n-Bone | Blaze Of Glory | | |
| September 13 | Outlawz | Perfect Timing | | |
| September 13 | Problem | Hotels | | |
| September 13 | Shawn Chrystopher | Silent Films For the Blind | | |
| September 16 | Fler | Im Bus ganz hinten | Debuted at No. 3 on the German Media Control Charts, No. 9 on the Austrian charts, No. 7 on the Swiss charts | |
| September 20 | Ampichino & Young Bossi | Cop Heavy Gang | | |
| September 20 | Big Scoob | No Filter | | |
| September 20 | Casey Veggies | Sleeping In Class (Re-Issue) | | |
| September 20 | Sir Jinx Presents | General Population | | |
| September 20 | Tragedy Khadafi | Thug Matrix 3 | | |
| September 20 | Z-Ro | Meth | Debuted at No. 90 on the Billboard 200 | |
| September 27 | 116 Clique | Man Up | Debuted at No. 82 on the Billboard 200 | |
| September 27 | 9th Wonder | The Wonder Years | Debuted at No. 70 on the Billboard 200 | |
| September 27 | Blu | Open | | |
| September 27 | Cormega | Raw Forever | | |
| September 27 | Evidence | Cats & Dogs | Debuted at No. 59 on the Billboard 200 | |
| September 27 | J-Live | S.P.T.A. (Said Person of That Ability) | | |
| September 27 | J. Cole | Cole World: The Sideline Story | Debuted at No. 1 on the Billboard 200; Singles: "Work Out", "Can't Get Enough", "Nobody's Perfect"; Certified Gold | |
| September 27 | Madlib | Medicine Show #12: Raw Medicine | | |
| September 27 | Phonte | Charity Starts At Home | Debuted at No. 56 on the Billboard 200 | |
| September 27 | The Jacka | The Indictment | | |
| September 27 | Tabi Bonney | The Summer Years | | |
| September 30 | brandUn DeShay | All Day DeShay: AM | | |
| October 3 | Myka 9 | Mykology | | |
| October 4 | Bizzy Bone & AC Killer | Countdown to Armageddon | | |
| October 4 | DJ Shadow | The Less You Know, the Better | | |
| October 4 | Exile | 4TRK MIND | | |
| October 4 | Kurupt Presents | Penagon Rydaz | | |
| October 4 | Styles P | Master of Ceremonies | Debuted at No. 33 on the Billboard 200 | |
| October 10 | Ill Bill | Howie Made Me Do It 2 | | |
| October 11 | DJ Drama | Third Power | Debuted at No. 42 on the Billboard 200; Singles: "Oh My" | |
| October 11 | MURS | Love Rockets Vol. 1: The Transformation | | |
| October 11 | Nappy Roots | Nappy Dot Org | | |
| October 11 | Roots Manuva | 4Everevolution | | |
| October 11 | The Away Team | Scars & Stripes | | |
| October 11 | Young Bleed | Preserved | | |
| October 14 | Bushido & Sido | 23 | Debuted at No. 3 on the German Media Control Charts, No. 3 on the Austrian charts, No. 1 on the Swiss charts | |
| October 14 | Kerser | The Nebulizer | | |
| October 14 | Kollegah | Bossaura | Debuted at No. 5 on the German Media Control Charts, No. 19 on the Austrian charts, No. 14 on the Swiss charts | |
| October 16 | Lowkey | Soundtrack to the Struggle | | |
| October 18 | Freestyle Fellowship | The Promise | | |
| October 18 | J. Stalin | I'm Sellin' Dope | | |
| October 18 | Witchdoctor | The United Race Ov America | | |
| October 25 | Jedi Mind Tricks | Violence Begets Violence | Debuted at No. 92 on the Billboard 200 | |
| October 25 | Marq Spekt & Kno | Machete Vision | | |
| October 25 | P.Watts & DJ Burn One | Element of Surprise | | |
| October 25 | Reef the Lost Cauze | Your Favorite MC | | |
| October 25 | San Quinn & Tuf Luv | A Hustler's Hope | | |
| October 25 | Statik Selektah | Population Control | | |
| October 31 | A$AP Rocky | Live. Love. A$AP | | |
| October 31 | Marracash | King Del Rap | | |
| October 31 | Twisted Insane | "The Root Of All Evil" | Brainsick Muzik | |
| November 1 | Black Milk & Danny Brown | Black and Brown | | |
| November 1 | Brotha Lynch Hung | Ripgut Collections Two | | |
| November 1 | Dumbfoundead | DFD | | |
| November 1 | Idle Warship | Habits of the Heart | | |
| November 1 | M.E.D. | Classic | | |
| November 1 | Rapper Big Pooh | Dirty Pretty Things | | |
| November 1 | Soulja Boy | Skate Boy | | |
| November 1 | Torae | For The Record | | |
| November 1 | Wale | Ambition | Debuted at No. 2 on the Billboard 200; Singles: "That Way", "Lotus Flower Bomb"; Certified Gold | |
| November 8 | Celph Titled & Buckwild | Nineteen Ninety More | | |
| November 8 | Mac Miller | Blue Slide Park | Debuted at No. 1 on the Billboard 200 | |
| November 8 | Moka Only & Chief | Crickets | | |
| November 8 | Pac Div | The DiV | | |
| November 8 | Pusha T | Fear of God II: Let Us Pray | Debuted at No. 66 on the Billboard 200 | |
| November 8 | Stalley | Lincoln Way Nights | | |
| November 8 | Tech N9ne Collabos | Welcome to Strangeland | Debuted at No. 21 on the Billboard 200 | |
| November 11 | CRUNK23 (Noah23 & Crunk Chris) | Illegal Ideas Inc. | | |
| November 11 | Donny Goines | Success Served Cold | | |
| November 11 | G-Side | Island | | |
| November 11 | Kool Savas | Aura | Debuted at No. 1 on the German Media Control chart | |
| November 11 | Lord Infamous | Scarecrow Tha Terrible | | |
| November 15 | Cappadonna | The Pilgrimage | | |
| November 15 | Childish Gambino | Camp | Debuted at No. 11 on the Billboard 200 | |
| November 15 | Drake | Take Care | Debuted at No. 1 on the Billboard 200; Singles include "Headlines", "Make Me Proud", "The Motto", "Take Care", "HYFR (Hell Ya Fuckin' Right)"; Certified Platinum | |
| November 15 | El Da Sensei | The Nu World Remix EP | | |
| November 15 | Eligh & AmpLive | Therapy At 3 | | |
| November 15 | Haystak & Jelly Roll | Strictly Business | | |
| November 15 | Lil' Keke | Testimony | | |
| November 15 | Locksmith | Embedded | | |
| November 15 | Webbie | Savage Life 3 | Debuted at No. 17 on the Billboard 200 | |
| November 21 | Mobb Deep | Black Cocaine | Debuted at No. 189 on the Billboard 200 | |
| November 21 | Ruff Ryders | Past, Present, Future | | |
| November 21 | Yelawolf | Radioactive | Debuted at No. 27 on the Billboard 200 | |
| November 22 | Action Bronson & Statik Selektah | Well Done | | |
| November 22 | Doomtree | No Kings | | |
| November 22 | Grap Luva | Neva Done | | |
| November 22 | Kidz in the Hall | Occasion | | |
| November 22 | Krayzie Bone | The Fixtape Vol. 4: Under The Influence | | |
| November 22 | M.O.P. & Snowgoons | Sparta | | |
| November 25 | Shabazz the Disciple | Hood Hopera (Theatrica Biblica) | | |
| November 29 | Jet Life | Jet World Order | Debuted at No. 148 on the Billboard 200 | |
| November 29 | Kid Sister | Kiss & Tell EP | | |
| November 29 | Snoop Dogg Presents Mac Lucci | The Pre-Hustle | | |
| December 6 | Cellski | Big Mafi The Don | | |
| December 6 | DJ Envy | Audio Uprising Vol. 1 | | |
| December 6 | Hasan Salaam | Music is My Weapon | | |
| December 6 | Keak da Sneak | Keak Hendrix | | |
| December 6 | Mistah F.A.B. | I Found My Backpack 2: The Lost Notebook | | |
| December 6 | San Quinn | G.O.D. – Guns Oil And Drugs – Recession Proof | | |
| December 6 | Swollen Members | 1997 | | |
| December 6 | The Roots | Undun | Debuted at No. 17 on the Billboard 200 | |
| December 9 | Russ | Velvet | | |
| December 12 | T. Mills | Leaving Home EP | | |
| December 13 | Crooked I | In None We Trust EP | | |
| December 13 | N.O.R.E. | Scared Money EP | | |
| December 13 | Naughty by Nature | Anthem Inc. | | |
| December 13 | Snoop Dogg & Wiz Khalifa | Mac & Devin Go to High School | Debuted at No. 26 on the Billboard 200; Single: "Young, Wild, & Free" | |
| December 13 | The Lost Children of Babylon | El's Appendices: The Scroll Of Lost Tales | | |
| December 13 | Tonedeff & Kno | Chico and the Man | | |
| December 13 | Gucci Mane & V-Nasty | BAYTL | | |
| December 20 | Common | The Dreamer/The Believer | Debuted at No. 18 on the Billboard 200 | |
| December 20 | La the Darkman | L.A.D. | | |
| December 20 | The Internet | Purple Naked Ladies | | |
| December 20 | Noah23 | Zoom | | |
| December 20 | Roscoe Dash | J.U.I.C.E. | | |
| December 20 | X-Clan | The Best Of X-Clan | | |
| December 20 | Young Jeezy | Thug Motivation 103: Hustlerz Ambition | Debuted at No. 3 on the Billboard 200; Singles: "Lose My Mind", "Ballin'", "I Do", "Leave You Alone"; Certified Gold | |
| December 26 | Rap-a-Lot Records | 25th Anniversary Collection | | |
| December 27 | Casual | He Think He #Rapgod | | |

== Highest first-week sales ==
List of top ten albums released in 2011 according to first-week sales, as of December 25, 2011
| Number | Album | Artist | 1st-week sales | 1st-week position | Refs |
|---|---|---|---|---|---|
| 1 | Tha Carter IV | Lil Wayne | 964,000 | 1 | |
| 2 | Take Care | Drake | 631,000 | 1 | |
| 3 | Watch the Throne | Jay-Z & Kanye West | 436,000 | 1 | |
| 4 | Thug Motivation 103: Hustlerz Ambition | Young Jeezy | 233,000 | 3 | |
| 5 | Cole World: The Sideline Story | J. Cole | 217,000 | 1 | |
| 6 | Lasers | Lupe Fiasco | 204,000 | 1 | |
| 7 | Rolling Papers | Wiz Khalifa | 197,000 | 2 | |
| 8 | Hell: The Sequel | Bad Meets Evil | 171,000 | 1 | |
| 9 | Ambition | Wale | 164,000 | 2 | |
| 10 | Blue Slide Park | Mac Miller | 144,000 | 1 | |

== Highest-charting singles ==
Hip hop singles which charted in the Top 40 of the Billboard Hot 100
| Title | Artist | Peak position |
|---|---|---|
| "Black and Yellow" | Wiz Khalifa | 1 |
| "She Will" | Lil Wayne featuring Drake | 3 |
| "Super Bass" | Nicki Minaj | 3 |
| "I Need a Doctor" | Dr. Dre featuring Eminem and Skylar Grey | 4 |
| "Lighters" | Bad Meets Evil featuring Bruno Mars | 4 |
| "How To Love" | Lil Wayne | 5 |
| "Look At Me Now" | Chris Brown featuring Lil Wayne & Busta Rhymes | 6 |
| "No Sleep" | Wiz Khalifa | 6 |
| "Strange Clouds" | B.o.B featuring Lil Wayne | 7 |
| "Make Me Proud" | Drake featuring Nicki Minaj | 9 |
| "6 Foot 7 Foot" | Lil Wayne featuring Cory Gunz | 9 |
| "The Show Goes On" | Lupe Fiasco | 9 |
| "Dance (Ass)" | Big Sean featuring Nicki Minaj | 10 |
| "I'm On One" | DJ Khaled featuring Drake, Rick Ross & Lil Wayne | 10 |
| "All of the Lights" | Kanye West featuring Rihanna & Kid Cudi | 11 |
| "Otis" | Jay-Z & Kanye West featuring Otis Redding | 12 |
| "Headlines" | Drake | 13 |
| "Moment 4 Life" | Nicki Minaj featuring Drake | 13 |
| "Roll Up" | Wiz Khalifa | 13 |
| "Where Them Girls At" | David Guetta featuring Flo Rida & Nicki Minaj | 14 |
| "Mirror" | Lil Wayne featuring Bruno Mars | 16 |
| "Fly" | Nicki Minaj featuring Rihanna | 19 |
| "John" | Lil Wayne featuring Rick Ross | 22 |
| "H.A.M." | Jay-Z & Kanye West | 23 |
| "Backseat" | New Boyz featuring The Cataracs & Dev | 26 |
| "Who Dat Girl" | Flo Rida featuring Akon | 29 |
| "My Last" | Big Sean featuring Chris Brown | 30 |
| "Marvin & Chardonnay" | Big Sean featuring Kanye West & Roscoe Dash | 32 |
| "Fast Lane" | Bad Meets Evil featuring Sly Jordan | 32 |
| "Blunt Blowin" | Lil Wayne | 33 |
| "Better With The Lights Off" | New Boyz featuring Chris Brown | 38 |
| "Out Of My Head" | Lupe Fiasco featuring Trey Songz | 40 |

== Number one albums in Europe ==
List of number one hip hop albums in major European markets
| Release Date | Album | Artist | Country | Weeks at no. 1 | Refs |
|---|---|---|---|---|---|
| February 14 | La Fouine vs Laouni | La Fouine | France | 1 | |
| March 5 | Reedukacja | Slums Attack | Poland | 2 | |
| May 13 | Jenseits von Gut und Böse | Bushido | Germany | 1 | |
| July 8 | XOXO | Casper | Germany | 1 | |
| July 29 | SchwarzWeiss | Samy Deluxe | Germany | 1 | |
| November 11 | Aura | Kool Savas | Germany | 1 | |

== Highest critically reviewed albums ==
=== Metacritic ===
| Number | Artist | Album | Average score | Number of reviews | Reference |
|---|---|---|---|---|---|
| 1 | Saigon | The Greatest Story Never Told | 89 | 13 reviews | |
| 2 | The Roots | Undun | 88 | 32 reviews | |
| 3 | Beastie Boys | Hot Sauce Committee Part Two | 83 | 42 reviews | |
| 4 | Shabazz Palaces | Black Up | 83 | 36 reviews | |
| 5 | ASAP Rocky | Live.Love.ASAP | 83 | 12 reviews | |
| 6 | Danny Brown | XXX | 83 | 9 reviews | |
| 7 | Death Grips | Exmilitary | 82 | 7 reviews | |
| 8 | G-Side | The One... Cohesive | 82 | 6 reviews | |
| 9 | Royce da 5'9" | Success Is Certain | 82 | 5 reviews | |
| 10 | Kendrick Lamar | Section.80 | 80 | 11 reviews | |

=== AnyDecentMusic? ===
| Number | Artist | Album | Average score | Number of reviews | Reference |
|---|---|---|---|---|---|
| 1 | Shabazz Palaces | Black Up | 8.2 | 28 reviews | |
| 2 | The Roots | Undun | 7.9 | 23 reviews | |
| 3 | Dels | Gob | 7.7 | 16 reviews | |
| 4 | Big K.R.I.T | Return of 4Eva | 7.6 | 5 reviews | |
| 4 | Saigon | The Greatest Story Never Told | 7.6 | 5 reviews | |

== See also ==
- Previous article: 2010 in hip-hop
- Next article: 2012 in hip-hop
