= The Cataracs discography =

The Cataracs was an American hip hop record production project and duo formed in Berkeley, California, consisting of songwriter, vocalist, and producer Niles "Cyranizzy" Hollowell-Dhar (born October 6, 1988) and formerly songwriter and vocalist David "Campa" Benjamin Singer-Vine (March 9, 1988).

== Studio albums ==
List of studio albums
Title	Album details
Technohop Vol. 1	Released: July 7, 2006; Label: Cyrano; Format: Digital download
Technohop Vol. 2	Released: July 7, 2007; Label: Cyrano; Format: Digital download
The 13th Grade	Released: January 1, 2008; Label: Indie Pop; Format: Digital download
Songs We Sung In Showers	Released: January 1, 2009; Label: Indie Pop; Format: Digital download

== Extended plays ==
List of extended plays
Title	EP details
Lingerie EP	Released: August 8, 2008; Label: Indie Pop; Formats: Digital download
Gordo Taqueria	Released: July 17, 2012; Label: Universal Republic; Formats: Digital download
Loud Xmas	Released: Dec 25, 2012; Label: Universal Republic; Formats: Digital download
Loud Science	Released: January 8, 2013; Label: Universal Republic; Formats: Digital download

== Singles ==
=== As lead artist ===
List of singles as lead artist, with selected chart positions, showing year released and album name
Title	Year	Peak chart positions									Album
Title	Year	FRA	AUS	AUT	BEL (FL)	BEL (WA)	GER	NLD	SWI	CAN	Album
"Club Love"	2009	—	—	—	—	—	—	—	—	—	Non-album singles
"Top of the World" (featuring Dev)	2011	66	—	—	—	27	—	—	—	61	Non-album singles
"Sunrise" (featuring Dev)	2011	—	—	—	—	—	—	—	—	—	Non-album singles
"All You" (featuring Waka Flocka Flame and Kaskade)	2012	—	—	—	54	—	—	—	—	—	Gordo Taqueria
"Alcohol"	2012	—	—	—	—	44	—	—	—	—	Gordo Taqueria
"Missed U 2" (featuring Petros)	2013	—	—	—	—	—	—	—	—	—	Non-album singles
"Big Dipper" (featuring Luciana)	2013	—	—	—	—	—	—	—	—	—	Non-album singles
"Hey Now" (with Martin Solveig featuring Kyle)	2013	55	71	8	31	43	10	7	40	—	Non-album singles
"Dagger" (with Trevor Simpson)	2013	—	—	—	—	—	—	—	—	—	Non-album singles
"Make Ya Body Whistle" (with Dev)	2025	—	—	—	—	—	—	—	—	—	Non-album singles
"—" denotes a recording that did not chart or was not released in that territory.

=== As featured artist ===
List of singles as featured artist, with selected chart positions and certifications, showing year released and album name
Title	Year	Peak chart positions										Certifications	Album
Title	Year	US	AUS	AUT	CAN	IRL	NL	NZ	SWE	SWI	UK	Certifications	Album
"I Get Doe" (Glasses Malone featuring The Cataracs)	2010	—	—	—	—	—	—	—	—	—	—		Beach Cruiser
"Like a G6" (Far East Movement featuring The Cataracs and Dev)	2010	1	2	8	3	12	3	1	7	10	5	US: 4× Platinum; AUS: 3× Platinum; NZ: Platinum; SWE: Gold; SWI: Gold	Free Wired
"Bass Down Low" (Dev featuring The Cataracs)	2010	61	66	—	35	28	92	—	—	—	10		The Night the Sun Came Up
"Backseat" (New Boyz featuring The Cataracs and Dev)	2011	26	89	—	52	—	—	28	—	—	55		Too Cool to Care
"Love Letter" (Shwayze featuring The Cataracs and Dev)	2011	—	—	—	—	—	—	—	—	—	—		Love Stoned
"—" denotes a recording that did not chart or was not released in that territory.

== Guest appearances ==
List of non-single guest appearances, with other performing artists, showing year released and album name
Title	Year	Other artist(s)	Album
"Fall in Love"	2009	Ya Boy	none
"Cali Luv"	2013	Snow Tha Product	Good Nights & Bad Mornings 2: The Hangover
"Thank You"	2013	Master Shortie, Leaf	Studying Abroad

== Music videos ==
=== As lead artist ===
List of music videos as lead artist, showing year released and directors
Title	Year	Director(s)
"Murder She Wrote"	2007	Colin Tilley
"Hit Me Back"	2008	Colin Tilley
"Freakin' Ta Ma Song"	2008	Colin Tilley
"Julia"	2008	Colin Tilley
"Baby Baby (The Lovers Anthem)"	2009	TAJ
"Club Love"	2009	Colin Tilley
"Top of the World" (featuring Dev)	2011	Ethan Lader
"Sunrise" (featuring Dev)	2011	Anthony Fox
"All You" (featuring Waka Flocka Flame and Kaskade)	2012	Mickey Finnegan
"Alcohol" (featuring Sky Blu)	2013	Tyler Yee
"Roll The Dice"	2013	Anthony Fox
"Missed U 2" (featuring Petros)	2013	Anthony Fox
"Big Dipper" (featuring Luciana)	2013	Colin Tilley

=== As featured artist ===
List of music videos as featured artist, showing year released and directors
Title	Year	Director(s)
"I Get Doe" (Glasses Malone featuring The Cataracs)	2010	Kimberly S. Stuckwisch / Yon Thomas
"Like a G6" (Far East Movement featuring The Cataracs and Dev)	2010	Matt Alonzo
"Backseat" (New Boyz featuring The Cataracs and Dev)	2011	Ethan Lader
"Bass Down Low"" (Dev featuring The Cataracs)	2011	Jake Davis
"Love Letter" (Shwayze featuring The Cataracs and Dev)	2011	Mikey Easterling
"Thank You" (Master Shortie featuring The Cataracs and Leaf)	2013	Jess Dee
