= 10 Mile Stereo =

Promotional single by Beach House

from the album Teen Dream
- Released: November 1, 2010
- Recorded: July 2009
- Studio: Dreamland (Hurley, New York)
- Genre: Dream pop; shoegaze
- Length: 5:03 (album version); 2:40 (radio edit)
- Label: Sub Pop; Bella Union
- Songwriter: Victoria Legrand
- Producers: Beach House; Chris Coady

Music video
- "10 Mile Stereo" on YouTube

"10 Mile Stereo" is a song by American dream pop duo Beach House, from their third studio album, Teen Dream, which was released on January 26, 2010. It was later released as a promotional single in the United Kingdom on November 1, 2010, by Bella Union. Along with the tracks from Teen Dream, "10 Mile Stereo" was recorded in July 2009 at Dreamland in Hurley, New York.

"10 Mile Stereo" is a shoegaze track that rhythmically intensifies into crashing drums and cymbals, relying on bossa nova-like elements, distorted guitars and a programmed drum beat. The track lyrically revolves around the outcome of someone feeling apathetic after a failed relationship. Lead vocalist Victoria Legrand called it "one of the most imaginative songs", in lyrical terms. The song received positive reviews from critics, with some calling it a highlight track from Teen Dream.

The duo performed "10 Mile Stereo" on Conan on December 20, 2010. At around the same month, the song was used in a Guinness commercial that debuted in Ireland. In 2011, it was sampled on hip hop duo G-Side's track "How Far". By April 2012, the song had sold 40,000 digital track downloads, being the most commercially successful track from Teen Dream at the time. A "Cough Syrup" remix of the track, which was initially released in 2010, was later included on their compilation album, B-Sides and Rarities (2017).

== Background and composition ==
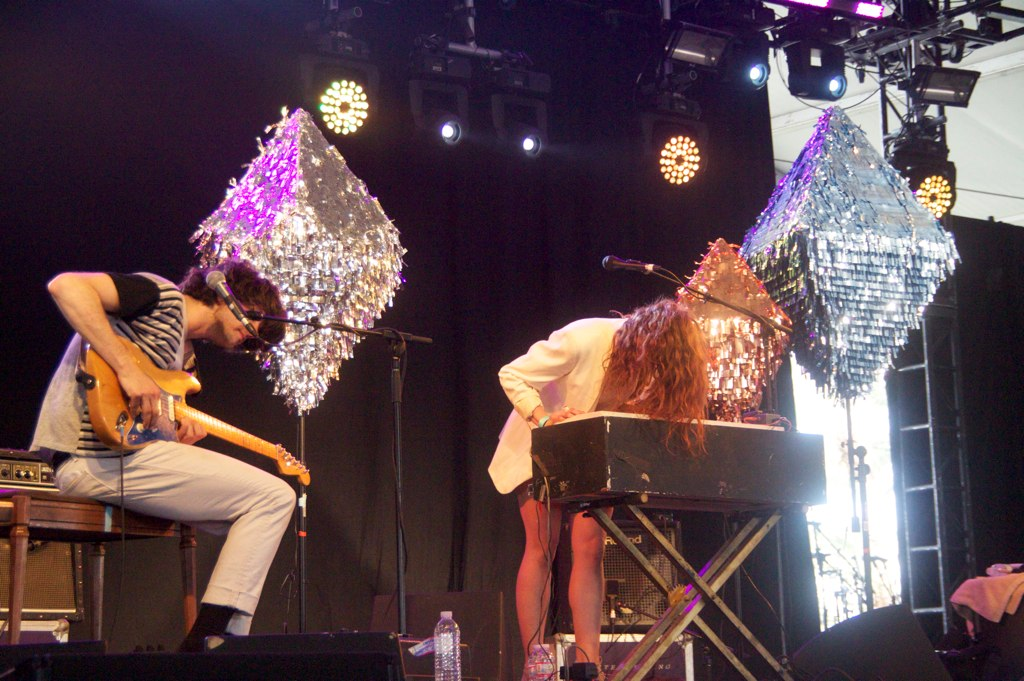
Beach House performing at Coachella 2010

In September 2009, following the release of their second studio album, Devotion (2008), it was announced that the duo had signed onto Sub Pop, marking their departure from Carpark. Along with this, it was confirmed that the duo were recording their third studio album. In October of that same year, the duo officially announced their third studio album, Teen Dream, and revealed its tracklist, where "10 Mile Stereo" was listed as the eighth track. With this record deal, they were able to produce a DVD version and hire a producer for the album, Chris Coady. "10 Mile Stereo" and the other tracks from Teen Dream were recorded in July 2009 at Dreamland Studios, located in Hurley, New York.

"10 Mile Stereo" is an accelerated shoegaze track. It relies on the use of distorted guitars and a fast drum beat, with its overall musical structure intensifying into a blast of rhythm and actuation. Similarly to the Teen Dream track "Used to Be", the track begins with a quarter noted bass drum pattern and later transitions into a "galloping bossa nova" section. The track intensifies from this point, concluding with a climax of aggressive drums and crash cymbals. Lyrically, it revolves around a person feeling apathetic after a failed relationship. Lead vocalist Victoria Legrand stated that the song is "one of the most imaginative songs, lyrically and visually" and felt that they "went off a little bit farther from [their] world".

== Release and promotion ==
"10 Mile Stereo" was originally released on January 26, 2010, as part of Beach House's third studio album Teen Dream. On the same day, the duo performed "10 Mile Stereo" as the encore song for their album release concert at The Bell House in Brooklyn, New York. Prior to the song's official release, an official music video for it, which was directed by Kari Aitmann, was first premiered on January 20, by music blog Gorilla vs. Bear, who also premiered two other music videos from the DVD version of Teen Dream prior, with permission from the band and their label, Sub Pop.

Also recorded during the Teen Dream sessions in July 2009, a "Cough Syrup" remix of the track was released on April 17, as part of the duo's Record Store Day-exclusive EP Zebra; that version was later included on the duo's compilation album, B-Sides and Rarities, released on June 30, 2017. On November 1, 2010, "10 Mile Stereo" was released as a promotional single by Bella Union. On December 20, they performed the track on Conan. According to Nielsen SoundScan, "10 Mile Stereo" was the best-selling track from Teen Dream, digitally, selling over 40,000 track downloads, as of April 2012. They later performed it as one of the three encore tracks for their album release concert for their fourth album, Bloom, on May 15, 2012.

== Reception and legacy ==
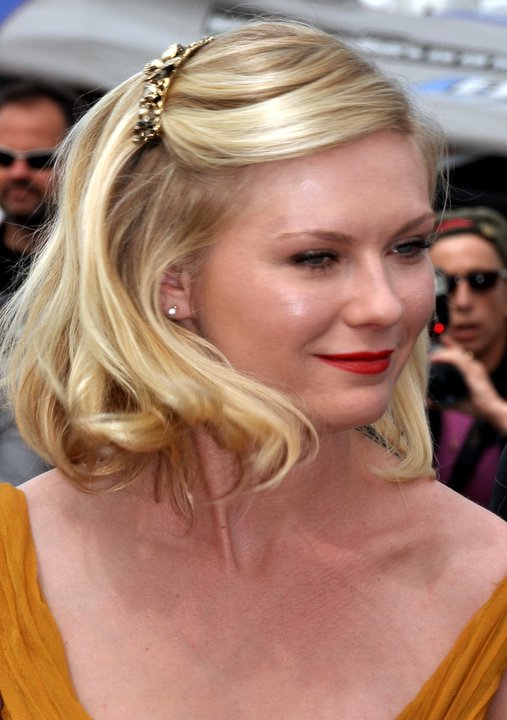
"10 Mile Stereo" influenced actress Kirsten Dunst (left) during the filming of Melancholia (2011). The song was also sampled on hip hop duo G-Side's (right) song "How Far" (2011).

The song received positive reviews from music critics. Larry Fitzmaurice of Tiny Mix Tapes named it the highlight track of Teen Dream. Joel Eliott of Cokemachineglow said that it is "the kind of song you can't imagine a band ever topping".

In 2013, John Everhart of Stereogum listed "10 Mile Stereo" as the fourth best Beach House song, attributing to Kirsten Dunst's interview with Spin, in which she stated that she listened to the track on repeat while filming Melancholia (2011); Everhart understood why she listened to the song that way, additionally stating that it is "a magnificent song instrumentally". In 2018, Matt the Raven of Under the Radar listed it as the best Beach House song. Andrew Hanson of Cultr named "10 Mile Stereo" the second best indie song of the 2010s decade, praising its conception and referring it as "a song carried by sound waves into the future."

"10 Mile Stereo" was used in a Guinness commercial that debuted in Ireland on December 17, 2010, and in the United Kingdom in March 2011. Legrand stated that they were "adamant about it staying within a certain artistic territory." In 2011, hip hop duo G-Side sampled the track in their song "How Far", which is included on their album The One...Cohesive.

== Track listing ==
- UK radio edit
1. "10 Mile Stereo" (radio edit) – 2:40

== Personnel ==
Credits adapted from the liner notes of Teen Dream.

Beach House

- Victoria Legrand – vocals, keyboards
- Alex Scally – guitar, bass

Additional musicians

- Graham Hill – drums, percussion

Production

- Chris Coady – production, engineering, mixing
- Beach House – production, arrangement
- Nilesh Patel – mastering
