= Gz II Godz =

Studio album by G-Side
- Released: May 15, 2014
- Genre: Hip hop
- Length: 55:37
- Label: Slow Motion Soundz
- Producer: Block Beattaz; Stacktrace; Blaque

G-Side chronology
Island (2011)	Gz II Godz (2014)	The 2 Cohesive (2018)

Gz II Godz is the sixth studio album by American hip hop duo G-Side. It was released by Slow Motion Soundz on May 15, 2014. The cover art is designed by John Turner Jr.

== Critical reception ==
Professional ratings
Review scores
Source	Rating
Exclaim!	8/10
Pitchfork	7.2/10
Spin	8/10
Stereogum	favorable

Brandon Soderberg of Spin gave the album an 8 out of 10, calling it "quintessential G-Side: tragically optimistic trappers trying to make good when they’ve been handed a fairly garbage hand." David Turner of Pitchfork gave the album a 7.2 out of 10, commenting that "Honesty has always been located at the core of G-Side's music, but they remain striving nonetheless, and Gz II Godz is the work of a duo that have only gotten wiser since they last rhymed together." Samantha O'Connor of Exclaim! wrote, "In an era drowning in 808s and synths, the diverse project is an invigorating buffet, proving that the pair knows who they are sonically but aren't afraid to experiment."

Stereogum placed it at number 20 on the "40 Best Rap Albums of 2014" list.

== Track listing ==
No.	Title	Producer(s)	Length
1.	"Resurrection"	Block Beattaz	0:55
2.	"G Side Back"	Block Beattaz	1:30
3.	"Statue"	Block Beattaz	3:36
4.	"I Do" (featuring Mic Strange)	Block Beattaz	4:40
5.	"2004" (featuring Joi Tiffany)	Block Beattaz	4:19
6.	"Dead Fresh" (featuring Kristmas and Grilly)	Block Beattaz; Stacktrace	4:10
7.	"Higher" (featuring Joi Tiffany)	Block Beattaz	3:33
8.	"Bassheadz" (featuring G Mane)	Block Beattaz; Blaque	4:57
9.	"Gold" (featuring Ink)	Block Beattaz	4:29
10.	"In Luv with Jhene Aiko"	Block Beattaz	4:01
11.	"Elbow Smash"	Block Beattaz	4:09
12.	"Muffins"	Block Beattaz	4:20
13.	"1 Thing"	Block Beattaz	2:40
14.	"Create" (featuring Codie Global)	Block Beattaz	4:27
15.	"Last Words"	Block Beattaz	0:39
Total length:			55:37
