= Island (G-Side album) =

Studio album by G-Side
- Released: November 11, 2011
- Genre: Hip hop
- Length: 55:50
- Label: Slow Motion Soundz
- Producer: Block Beattaz; Clova; Parallel Thought; Spaceliqs

G-Side chronology
The One...Cohesive (2011)	Island (2011)	Gz II Godz (2014)

Island (stylized as iSLAND) is the fifth studio album by American hip hop duo G-Side. It was released by Slow Motion Soundz on November 11, 2011.

== Critical reception ==
Professional ratings
Review scores
Source	Rating
The A.V. Club	B+
Consequence of Sound	C+
Pitchfork	7.9/10
Spin	favorable

Evan Rytlewski of The A.V. Club gave the album a grade of B+, writing, "There are hundreds of rappers dwelling on the same themes of hustle and determination as Yung Clova and ST 2 Lettaz, including some that do so with nimbler flows and sharper wordplay, but there are few that match the duo's personality and conviction." Tom Breihan of Stereogum commented that "Production team Block Beattaz has made another zoned-out polyglot music tapestry for them, sampling stuff like Joy Orbison and Tame Impala but grounding it in classic Southern rap thump."

== Track listing ==
No.	Title	Producer(s)	Length
1.	"Island" (featuring Charlie Braxton)	Block Beattaz; Clova	1:54
2.	"Cinematic"	Block Beattaz	5:07
3.	"Atmosphere" (featuring PH)	Block Beattaz	2:26
4.	"No U in Us"	Block Beattaz	3:00
5.	"24 Eight"	Block Beattaz	3:26
6.	"Recognize" (featuring PH)	Block Beattaz	3:37
7.	"Cast Away" (featuring Joi Tiffany)	Parallel Thought	3:32
8.	"Stay-Cation" (featuring Joi Tiffany)	Block Beattaz	3:51
9.	"Down" (featuring Adrian)	Block Beattaz; Spaceliqs	3:56
10.	"Luv 2 Hustle" (featuring GIA and DJ Cunta)	Block Beattaz	4:35
11.	"Gettin' It" (featuring Stalley and Joi Tiffany)	Block Beattaz	4:34
12.	"Our Thing"	Block Beattaz	4:42
13.	"Rabbits"	Parallel Thought	3:36
14.	"16 Shots" (featuring Bentley)	Block Beattaz; Clova	5:04
15.	"Look Up"	Block Beattaz	3:21
Total length:			55:50
