= Skinny Jeanz and a Mic =

Studio album by New Boyz
- Released: September 15, 2009
- Recorded: 2008–2009
- Genre: Pop-rap; hyphy
- Length: 43:08
- Label: Shotty; Asylum; Warner Bros.
- Producer: Legacy; DJ Felli Fel; Jay-Nari; D&D

New Boyz chronology
Skinny Jeanz and a Mic (2009)	Too Cool to Care (2011)

Singles from Skinny Jeanz and a Mic
- 1. "You're a Jerk" Released: April 2, 2009; 2. "Tie Me Down" Released: August 31, 2009

Skinny Jeanz and a Mic is the debut studio album by American hip hop duo New Boyz, composed of rappers Legacy and Ben J. It was released on September 15, 2009, via Shotty Music, Asylum Records and Warner Bros. Records. The album was heavily influenced by jerkin' music. It received generally positive reviews, being called the sixth best album of 2009 by The New York Times. The album was released after the duo brought jerkin' to national attention with their viral hit "You're a Jerk", which later became a commercial success and the first single off their album. The second single "Tie Me Down", featuring Ray J, was released and also was successful. The album debuted at fifty-six on the Billboard 200, and at number twelve on Top R&B/Hip-Hop Albums and eight on Top Rap Albums. The album was produced by New Boyz member, Legacy, and also contributions from producers, Jay-Nari, D&D and DJ Felli Fel.

== Background ==
The album was originally scheduled for release, August 18, 2009, but plans were changed for unknown reasons. Legacy received main production credits on the album. In an interview with Format Magazine he said, "I started making beats because I didn’t want everybody else’s sound. We wanted our own sound. So, I had no choice but to make my own beats to get that sound." In an interview with Ozone Magazine, when asked about their music and the revival of the "newer west" movement, Ben J stated, "Everything is becoming positive out here. People are growing out of that old mentality. Rapping about gangs ain’t really what it’s about out here now. Everybody is having fun." In the same interview, Legacy said, "I think music like ours is coming from people being tired of the same ol’ thing. People thought they had to bang to be the cool kid but now the smart kid is the cool kid. People being creative are the people coming up right now."

In an interview with HipHopDX, Legacy said the album was, "[It’s] pretty much like the lifestyle and the culture of the typical California teenager put in[to] music. It’s going to surprise a lot of people, because a lot of people think we just make the jerk songs [and] dance music." According to Legacy, only two tracks on the album are jerking songs. He also stated that the album is about a lot of different topics, and was quick to point out that most of them were pre-"Jerk" stating they were fifteen songs in before 'You're a Jerk'. Most of the producers on the album were mostly unknown, local producers. Legacy said, "We have no big producers on our album. All of our producers are like kids our age. Everything complements each other, because the style and the music are so new to the game."

== Composition ==
Many critics noted Several songs are built on the same formula of "You're a Jerk", with AllMusic noting that, "Dot Com," "Colors," "Turnt," and "So Dope" (which the chorus is a sound bite from the 1992 film Class Act) all have the cheesy drum machines, samples, and off-kilter lyric approach that make "Jerk" so good. The review also said "R&B ballad "Tie Me Down" featuring smooth Auto-tuned vocals from Ray J, the B.A.S.S.-inspired "Bunz", the slow jam "New Girl," and the rollicking "Cashmere," which bumps along like a New Jack rap jam, are nice diversions." On the album split, The Los Angeles Times said, "The album begins to lose circulation toward its end, when the pair lose their lambent wit in favor of mawkish lover-boy ballads better left to Sean Kingston albums." Jeff Weiss of the newspaper used "Tie Me Down" as an example, noting that its sounds have "a saccharine sappiness and contrived tone that feels at odds with the otherwise organic-sounding album."

Some points of the work were inspired by Pharrell Williams, Kanye West, and other "hip-hop style eccentrics". The songs on the album have heavy lyrical underlies, noted by several critics. The comic-esque "Way 2 Many Chickz" described as talking about "a string of almost-conquests better left unvanquished": "Chick had a cold sore that looked like John McCain." On "Cashmere", Ben J and Legacy "try to outdo each other to win the attention of a young woman, but, predictably, she spurns them both". The lyrics also cover their difference in style, as seen in "Cricketz", as Legacy raps, "Jeans stay skinny like I starve my fabric, Another damn thing/You’ll never see me care about another man’s jeans." Jon Caramanica of The New York Times responded, "Baggy has been de rigueur in hip-hop for so long it’s easy to forget that 25 years ago, rappers gladly wore tight denim. Now it’s cause for a fight." Some of the lyrics use double entendre, with the duo referring to themselves as "rejects" and "jerks" on "Dot Com", which The Los Angeles Times called "both a double-entendre for the dance moves spurring the craze, and illustrative of their generation’s reclamation of formerly nerdy archetypes."

== Singles ==
"You're a Jerk" was released as the album's first single on April 2, 2009. The song was a viral success, and later succeeded peaked at number twenty-four on the U.S. Billboard Hot 100, thirteen on Hot R&B/Hip-Hop Songs and four on Hot Rap Songs.

"Tie Me Down" was released as the album's second single on August 31, 2009, it peaked at number twenty-two on the U.S. Billboard Hot 100, and five on Hot Rap Songs. It reached forty two on Hot R&B/Hip Hop Songs, and fared better on mainstream airplay, the duo's first entry at pop radio, peaking at twenty-three on the Mainstream Top 40 (Pop Songs) chart.

There are music videos for three of the album's songs, "Cricketz" featuring Tyga, "So Dope" and "Dot Com".

== Reception ==
=== Commercial response ===
The album debuted at number fifty-six on the U.S. Billboard 200, and spent four weeks on the chart. It debuted and peaked at number eight on the Top Rap Albums chart and number twelve on the Top R&B/Hip-Hop Albums chart. Before falling off the chart in November 2009, the album had sold around 35,000 copies. The album has sold 133,500 copies til' the beginning of 2011.

=== Critical response ===
Skinny Jeans and a Mic
Review scores
Source	Rating
AllMusic	3/5 stars
BBC	(positive)
The Los Angeles Times	3/5 stars
The New York Times	(positive)
XXL	3/5 stars
DJBooth.net	2.5/5 stars

Tim Sendra of AllMusic gave the album three out of five stars review, and said the album had the "cheesy drum machines, samples, and off-kilter lyric approach that make 'Jerk' so good", and that "the duo stick to the template [of 'Jerk'], considering the uniqueness of the sound they've created and also the fact that it's a debut record made by teenagers, and an impressive and unfailingly fun debut at that." The review goes on to point out that "the reliance on the 'Jerk' sound can be a little monotonous, there are enough variations along the way to keep things interesting." He also says "The duo's flow is not incredible but they spit convincingly. If you were looking for undisputedly pop-rap with a fresh sound and a light lyrical touch, the New Boyz debut is a fine destination." XXL said that the album delivered "unexpected lyrical talent" but that it lacked "sonic variety". The review also goes on to say that the album "is no hip-hop classic, but rather the breath of fresh air rap needs". Jeff Weiss of The Los Angeles Times gave the album three stars, commenting that the album "is a catchy and charismatic debut that should engender pleasant teen nostalgia in anyone old enough to vote and help explain why for the last six months, the kids have been saying out with the old, in with the New Boyz". The review also said that the album "successfully strikes a balance between introducing a new sound (the minimalist bass-heavy bounce of jerk music) and style (skinny jeans, Vans and 'colors that ain't even on the rainbow'), with traditional teenage themes (girls, the desire for self-expression, adults who don't understand, girls). The result is a West Coast antidote to the South's veritable monopoly on homeroom rap—a relentlessly breezy and fun ride through the lives of a pair of class clowns bent on enjoying the face cards that fate dealt." The Selby Times said that the album "is about as happening as it gets for teenage music with an attitude, even if it makes adults' eyes roll in disgust". Wendy Roby of BBC said that, "[O]verall their sheer chutzpah wins you over – and with its day-glo tongue wedged so very firmly in its cheek, Skinny Jeanz and a Mic is hard to resist". Jon Caramanica of The New York Times called the album "one of the year's most charming rap debuts, and certainly the least expected". In a separate review, he named the album the sixth best album of the year, commenting, "Emerging from Southern California’s jerk scene, this teenage duo made an album that's appealingly young, simultaneously wide-eyed and knowingly lewd." DJBooth.net's Nathan Slavik was less positive, predicting that the album would be "the last time we hear from the New Boyz".

== Track listing ==
No.	Title	Writer(s)	Producer(s)	Length
1.	"Cricketz" (featuring Tyga)	Dominic Thomas; Earl Benjamin; Michael Stevenson; Keith Brown	Legacy	3:25
2.	"You're a Jerk"	Thomas; Benjamin	Legacy	3:09
3.	"Dot Com"	Thomas; Benjamin; Keith Brown	Legacy	3:30
4.	"Colorz"	Thomas; Benjamin	Legacy	3:55
5.	"Way 2 Many Chickz"	Thomas; Benjamin	Legacy	3:24
6.	"Turnt"	Thomas; Benjamin	Legacy	3:10
7.	"Bunz" (featuring Kydd-SB)	Thomas; Benjamin; David Ellie	Legacy	2:49
8.	"Cashmere"	Thomas; Benjamin	Legacy	3:05
9.	"So Dope"	Thomas; Benjamin; Ronald Jackson	Legacy	3:00
10.	"Tie Me Down" (featuring Ray J)	Thomas; Benjamin; Jason Wilkinson	Jay-Nari	2:58
11.	"New Girl" (featuring D&D)	Thomas; Benjamin; Dominique Logan; Darius Logan	D&D	3:30
12.	"No More" (featuring O.N.E.)	Thomas; Benjamin; Eric Bellinger; Keith Brown; Jonathan Castle; Justin Hunt; Guy James; Brandon Lucas	Legacy	3:55
13.	"One Night"	Thomas; Benjamin; James Corrine	DJ Felli Fel	3:20

iTunes Bonus Track
No.	Title	Writer(s)	Producer(s)	Length
14.	"Skinny Jeanz"	Thomas; Benjamin	Legacy	3:09

== Charts ==
=== Weekly charts ===
Chart (2009)	Peak position
US Billboard 200	56
US Top R&B/Hip-Hop Albums (Billboard)	12
US Top Rap Albums (Billboard)	8

=== Year-end charts ===
Chart (2010)	Position
US Top R&B/Hip-Hop Albums (Billboard)	68
US Top Rap Albums (Billboard)	33

== Certifications ==
Region	Certification	Certified units/sales
United States (RIAA)	Gold	500,000^{^}
^{^} Shipments figures based on certification alone.
