= Huntsville International =

Studio album by G-Side
- Released: November 18, 2009
- Genre: Hip hop
- Length: 55:38
- Label: Slow Motion Soundz
- Producer: Block Beataz; L-Don; Johnny Juliano; Bossman; Mick Vegas; P.T.

G-Side chronology
Starshipz and Rocketz (2008)	Huntsville International (2009)	The One...Cohesive (2011)

Huntsville International is the third studio album by American hip hop duo G-Side. It was released by Slow Motion Soundz on November 18, 2009.

== Critical reception ==
Professional ratings
Review scores
Source	Rating
Cokemachineglow	favorable
The Fader	favorable
Pitchfork	7.7/10

David Drake of Pitchfork gave the album a 7.7 out of 10, writing, "G-Side are artists who thrive in a world of decentralized discourse, who don't transcend their audience but who can upend the expectations of even the most jaded rap heads, if they give them a chance."

Cokemachineglow placed it at number 38 on the "Top 50 Albums 2009" list.

== Track listing ==
No.	Title	Producer(s)	Length
1.	"Intro: Rob Breezy"		1:02
2.	"Huntsville International" (featuring Sound of Silence)	Block Beattaz	4:22
3.	"So Gone"	L-Don	3:57
4.	"What's It All About"	Johnny Juliano	4:19
5.	"Bandz" (featuring DJ Cunta)	Bossman	4:58
6.	"Paradise"	Mick Vegas	2:56
7.	"Matthew Africa Speaks"		1:32
8.	"My Aura"	Mick Vegas	3:21
9.	"College Chicks"	Block Beattaz	3:22
10.	"This Groove" (featuring P.H.)	Block Beattaz	2:34
11.	"Feel The" (featuring 6 Tre Gangsta and AC)	Block Beattaz	4:11
12.	"Who's Hood?" (featuring Yelawolf)	Block Beattaz	3:24
13.	"This Is Life"	P.T.	4:32
14.	"In the Rain" (featuring Bentley)	Block Beattaz	4:12
15.	"Rising Sun" (featuring Kristmas)	Block Beattaz	4:11
16.	"So Wonderful" (featuring Chrystal Carr, G-Mane, and SupaKing)	Block Beattaz	3:38
Total length:			55:38
