= Too Cool to Care =

Studio album by New Boyz
- Released: May 17, 2011
- Genre: Pop rap
- Length: 55:31
- Label: Shotty • Asylum • Warner Bros.
- Producers: Chin Injeti; Cisse; C.P DUBB; Damon Sharpe; Detail; DJ Khalil; D&D; Donte "Dnyce" Blacksher; H Money; Jay-Nari; JMIKE; J.R. Rotem; Kane Beatz; Kevin McCall; Maejor; Matt Squire; Purps; Teddy Riley; the Cataracs

New Boyz chronology
Skinny Jeanz and a Mic (2009)	Too Cool to Care (2011)

Singles from Too Cool to Care
- 1. "Break My Bank" Released: July 13, 2010; 2. "Backseat" Released: February 15, 2011; 3. "Better with the Lights Off" Released: August 2, 2011

Too Cool to Care is the second and final studio album by American hip hop duo New Boyz. It was released on May 17, 2011, via Shotty Music, Asylum and Warner Bros. It reached number forty-one on the Billboard 200 chart, number nine on the R&B/Hip-Hop Albums chart, and number seven on the Rap Albums chart.

== Promotion ==
The album was available for pre-ordering on the New Boyz's website. The pre-order included the original CD, an MP3 download of the promotional single "Crush On You" featuring rapper YG, and produced by Meech Wells, and pair of randomly picked colored sunglasses, which are either green, orange, blue, purple, yellow, or red. There is also a music video for the song "Tough Kids", featuring Sabi, and produced by DJ Khalil.

As of January 1, 2012 the album has sold 50,065 copies in the US.

=== Singles ===
"Break My Bank, which features Iyaz, was released as the lead single in North America on July 13, 2010. The song peaked at number sixty-eight on the US Billboard Hot 100, and at number ten on the US Rap Songs chart. Due to it only achieving moderate success, it is only included on deluxe editions of the album. "Backseat", which features The Cataracs, and Dev, was released as the second single in North America, and as the lead single in international markets on February 15, 2011. It peaked at number twenty-six on the US Hot 100, number twelve on US Rap charts, and number seventeen on the US Pop Songs chart. The song also reached the top forty in New Zealand, in addition to charting in Australia, Canada, and the United Kingdom. "Better With the Lights Off", which features Chris Brown, was originally released as the second promotional single on May 3, 2011. It has been released as the third official single on August 2, 2011. The song debuted at number sixty-one on the US Hot 100, and has peaked at number thirty-eight. "Better With the Lights Off" has also peaked at number thirteen on the Rap Songs chart.

== Track listing ==
No.	Title	Writer(s)	Producer(s)	Length
1.	"Tough Kids" (featuring Sabi)	Dominic Thomas; Earl Benjamin; Jenice Portlock; Khalil Abdul Rahman	DJ Khalil; Chin Injeti (co.)	3:10
2.	"Crush On You" (featuring YG)	Thomas; Benjamin; Keenan Jackson; Keith Brown	Donte "Dnyce" Blacksher; Cisse	3:15
3.	"Active Kings" (featuring Tyga)	Thomas; Benjamin; Michael Stevenson; Christopher Washington	C.P DUBB	3:24
4.	"I Don’t Care" (featuring Big Sean)	Thomas; Benjamin; Sean Anderson; Brian Chase; Daniel Johnson; Karen O; Nick Zinner	Kane Beatz	3:57
5.	"Porn Star"	Thomas; Benjamin; Niles Hollowell-Dhar; David Singer-Vine; Devin Tailes	Kevin McCall	2:31
6.	"Magazine Girl"	Thomas; Benjamin; Keith Brown	Detail; H-Money (co.)	3:13
7.	"Backseat" (featuring The Cataracs and Dev)	Thomas; Benjamin; Howowell-Dhar; Singer-Vine; Tailes	The Cataracs	3:44
8.	"Meet My Mom"	Thomas; Benjamin; Dominique Logan; Darius Logan	D&D	4:09
9.	"Start Me Up" (featuring Maejor)	Thomas; Benjamin; Brandon Green	Maejor	3:02
10.	"Better with the Lights Off" (featuring Chris Brown)	Thomas; Benjamin; Christopher Brown	The Cataracs; H-Money (co.)	3:40
11.	"Break My Bank" (featuring Iyaz)	Thomas; Benjamin; Jonathan Rotem; Matt Squire; Damon Reinagle; Keidran Jones	J.R. Rotem; Squire; Damon Sharpe (co.)	2:57
12.	"Zonin'"	Thomas; Benjamin; Johnson	Kane Beatz; JMIKE (co.)	3:51
13.	"Let U Leave"	Thomas; Benjamin; Jason Wilkinson	Jay-Nari	3:07
14.	"Can't Nobody" (featuring Shanell)	Thomas; Benjamin; Roahn Hylton; Shanell Woodget	Kane Beatz	3:35
15.	"Black Dress"	Thomas; Benjamin; Nathaniel Caserta	Purps	3:26
16.	"Beautiful Dancer" (featuring Charlie Wilson)	Thomas; Benjamin; Charles Wilson; Jonathon Brown	Kane Beatz; Teddy Riley	4:30

Australian Bonus tracks
No.	Title	Writer(s)	Producer(s)	Length
17.	"You're a Jerk"	Thomas; Benjamin	Legacy	3:09
18.	"Tie Me Down" (featuring Ray J)	Thomas; Benjamin; Wilkinson	Jay-Nari	2:58

Too Cool to Care
Review scores
Source	Rating
Allmusic	3.5/5 stars

== Chart performance ==
Chart (2011)	Peak position
US Billboard 200	41
US Billboard R&B/Hip-Hop Albums	9
US Billboard Rap Albums	7

== Release history ==
Region	Date	Format
Canada	10 May 2011	Warner Music
United States	17 May 2011	Asylum Records
United Kingdom	17 May 2011	Wea/Asylum
Germany	30 September 2011	Warner Bros. Records
Australia	12 November 2011	-
