= Donny Goines =

American rapper

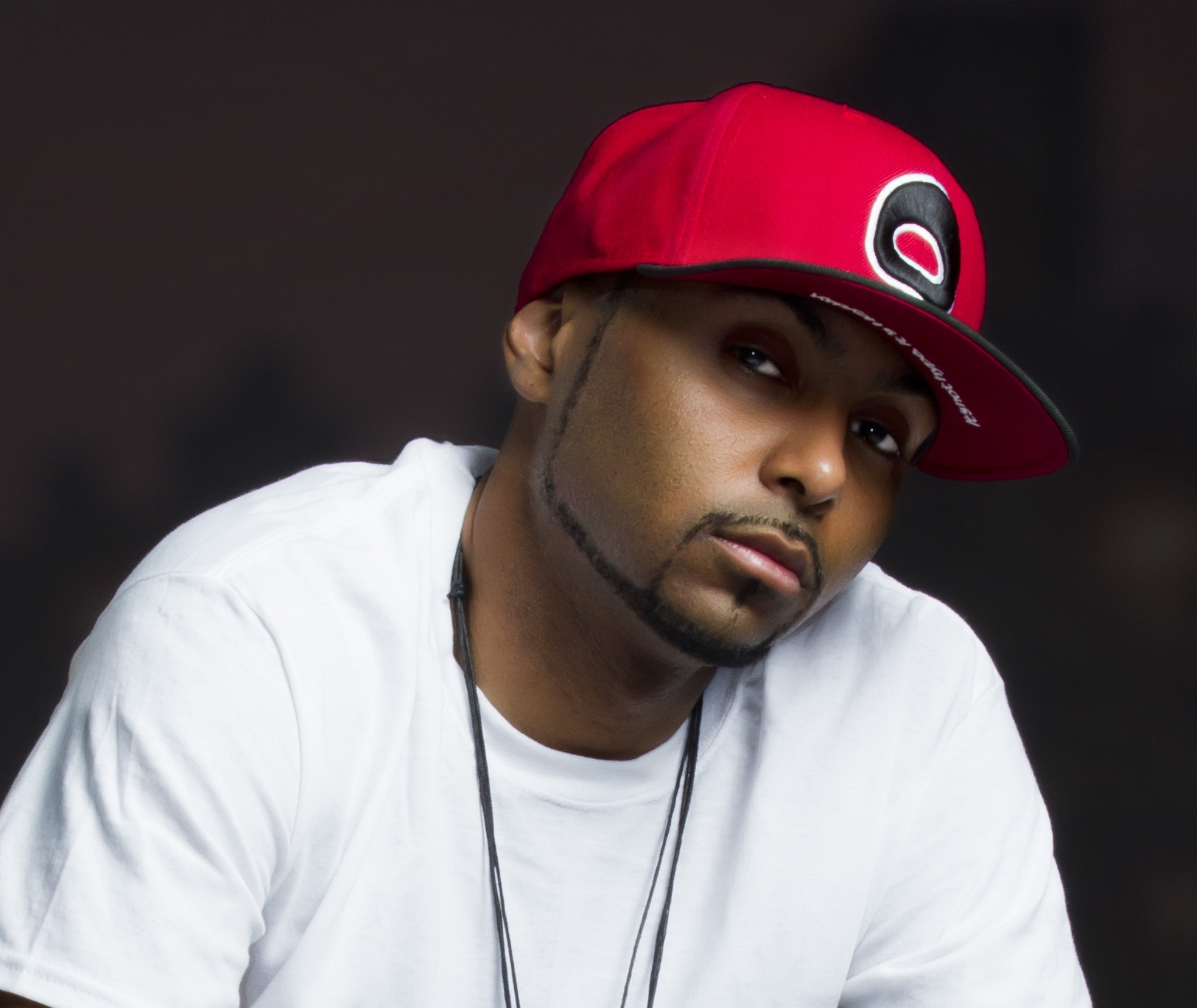
- Born: Donny Scott
- Occupation: Hip hop artist

Donny Scott, also known by his stage name Donny Goines, is an American rapper.

== Early life ==
Goines was born in Manhattan, New York City and spent the first years of his life there. At a young age his father was incarcerated for ten years, and he moved with his mother and siblings to Philadelphia. The kids were eventually taken in by their grandmother. Goines grew up in the boroughs of the Bronx and Harlem, New York City. Despite his tumultuous childhood he was able to develop his artistic talents with poems and freestyle raps, which eventually led him to his professional career.

== Career ==
In January 2006, he produced three songs uploaded on MySpace. He took the stage name Donny Goines—a take on the name of the author Donald Goines. Goines began working for the late producer Disco D in the summer of 2006 as a production intern and assistant. When Disco D was travelling for business, Goines was given permission to use his equipment to record his own personal tracks, including the use of Disco D's production beats. Goines spent his first few years developing his skills as an artist. In 2007, he released the album The Non Fiction. In 2008, he released the online album Minute After Midnight, executive produced by New York producer Dame Grease. He found his first national success that year in the viral online video series BARS, featuring freestyle rap. He was also a featured performer at that year's Underground Music Awards in New York City, where he was awarded the 2008 Buzz Factor Award. He was also featured on hip hop radio networks including Hot 97, and his music videos were featured on the websites of hip hop magazines including XXL Magazine.

In 2009, he released the album The Breakfast Club, which featured collaborations with artists including Kwamé, Statik Selektah, and Planet Asia. In 2010, MTV UK called Goines "your favourite MC's favourite artist". In a two-part interview with the television outlet, Goines opined on his reasons for remaining in the underground hip-hop scene instead of altering his music to obtain a major record deal. He stated that, "I might not be the richest rapper; I might not be the most famous but honestly speaking just having that respect and admiration? You can’t buy that. That is something you can never purchase, you know?" That year he released a six-song EP with Rocksmith Tokyo entitled 20X.

In 2011, he released the album Success Served Cold, which MTV reviewed, labelling Goines an "independent powerhouse". Goines stated that the album was a compilation of work he had done over the entirety of his career. Soon afterwards he was interviewed for VIBE Magazine, where he spoke about the importance of the team around him in creating his music and that his reaction to career disappointments was to work on and release new music. He was also interviewed by MTV U. On November 7, 2012, Donny Goines was filmed breaking the world record for longest freestyle rap, lasting twelve hours and twenty minutes.

In 2013, Goines retreated from the public eye due to illness. In 2015, he released the EP Gala.
