= Break My Bank =

Single by New Boyz featuring Iyaz

from the album Too Cool to Care
- Released: July 13, 2010
- Recorded: 2010
- Genre: Hip hop; reggae fusion
- Length: 2:57
- Label: Shotty; Asylum; Warner Bros.
- Songwriters: Dominic Thomas; Earl Benjamin; Jonathan Rotem; Matt Squire; Damon Reinagle; Keidran Jones
- Producers: J.R. Rotem; Matt Squire; Damon Sharpe (co.)

New Boyz singles chronology
| "Tie Me Down" (2009) | "Break My Bank" (2010) | "Backseat" (2011) |

Iyaz singles chronology
| "So Big" (2010) | "Break My Bank" (2010) | "Gonna Get This" (2010) |

"Break My Bank" is a song by American hip-hop duo New Boyz featuring Virgin Islands singer Iyaz. It was produced by J. R. Rotem and Matt Squire, with co-production by Damon Sharpe. The song is the lead single from their second studio album, Too Cool to Care.

== Composition ==
"Break My Bank"
A sample of "Break My Bank" which features a synth-string melody with hip-hop backbeats.

"Break My Bank" features an electronic "sugary" beat with synths and strings. The song features Iyaz singing reggae-rhythmed hook, as New Boyz deliver their lines in a "sing-song" style over an electronic beat and pop hooks. The lyrics refer to them "emptying their wallets to keep the attention of their desired girlfriends," through lines such as, "Had to scrape for some change / So I went to the bank / When I see her she was so damn fine like that / So I hit it right back pull out more stacks / She make me wanna break my bank."

== Live performances ==
New Boyz performed the song with Iyaz at WBBM's Summerfest in June 2010.

== Charts ==
Chart performance for "Break My Bank"
| Chart (2010) | Peak position |
|---|---|
| Australia (ARIA) | 67 |
| US Billboard Hot 100 | 68 |
| US R&B/Hip-Hop Songs | 63 |
| US Rap Songs | 10 |

== Release history ==
| Region | Date | Format |
|---|---|---|
| United States | July 13, 2010 | Digital download |
| United States | July 20, 2010 | Rhythmic airplay |
| United States | August 3, 2010 | Mainstream airplay |
| United States | August 3, 2010 | Urban airplay. |
