= You're a Jerk =

Single by New Boyz

from the album Skinny Jeanz and a Mic
- Released: April 2, 2009
- Recorded: 2008
- Genre: Pop rap; hyphy
- Length: 3:09
- Label: Shotty; Asylum; Warner Bros.
- Songwriter(s): Dominic Thomas; Earl Benjamin
- Producer(s): Legacy

New Boyz singles chronology
"You're a Jerk" (2009)	"Tie Me Down" (2009)

"You're a Jerk" is a song by American hip hop duo New Boyz from their debut studio album Skinny Jeanz and a Mic. It was produced by New Boyz member Legacy, and peaked at #24 on the Billboard Hot 100 chart.

== Music video ==
The music video was directed by Matt Alonzo of Skee. TV. At the beginning of the video Legacy gets a text message reading "You're a jerk". It then cuts to more people dancing on the street. Tyga and Paul Wall make cameos in the video. The video contains dancing by popular jerkin' crews UF Jerk Kings, The Ranger$ and Action Figures. The leaked and the video version of the song samples "Scotty" by Fabo of D4L.

== Track listing ==
Digital download

1. "You're a Jerk" - 3:09

Digital download EP

1. "You're a Jerk" - 3:09
2. "You're a Jerk" (music video) - 3:20

"You're a Jerk/Dot Com" Maxi Single

1. "You're a Jerk" (Webstar Remix) - 3:47
2. "You're a Jerk" (Fabo Remix) - 3:47
3. "You're a Jerk" (JumpSmoker Remix) - 3:22
4. "You're a Jerk (Versatile Remix) - 5:50
5. "Dot Com" - 3:31

== Charts ==
=== Weekly charts ===
Chart (2009)	Peak position
US Billboard Hot 100	24
US Hot R&B/Hip-Hop Songs (Billboard)	13
US Rhythmic (Billboard)	9

=== Year-end charts ===
Chart (2009)	Position
US Hot R&B/Hip-Hop Songs (Billboard)	83
US Rhythmic (Billboard)	38
