= All You (song) =

Single by The Cataracs featuring Waka Flocka Flame and Kaskade

from the album Gordo Taqueria
- Released: April 3, 2012
- Recorded: 2012
- Genre: Electropop, hip-hop
- Length: 3:36
- Label: Universal Republic
- Songwriters: Niles Hollowell-Dhar, David Singer-Vine, Juaquin Malphurs, Ryan Raddon, Finn Bjarnson
- Producer: The Cataracs

The Cataracs singles chronology
"Sunrise" (2011)	"All You" (2012)	"Alcohol" (2012)

Waka Flocka Flame singles chronology
"Lights Down Low" (2012)	"All You" (2012)	"Get Low" (2012)

Kaskade singles chronology
"Room for Happiness" (2012)	"All You" (2012)	"Lick It" (2012)

Music video
- "All You" on YouTube

"All You" is a 2012 single by The Cataracs featuring rapper Waka Flocka Flame and house music producer Kaskade. The chorus is sampled from the Kaskade track of the same name from his 2006 album, Love Mysterious. The song was also included in The Cataracs' 2012 EP Gordo Taqueria.

== Music video ==
The music video was published to YouTube through The Cataracs' VEVO channel on May 25, 2012, and is five minutes and fifty-three seconds long.

== Charts ==
Chart (2012)	Peak; position
Belgium Urban (Ultratop Flanders)	47
Belgium (Ultratip Bubbling Under Flanders)	54
US Rhythmic Airplay (Billboard)	38
