= Success Is Certain =

Studio album by Royce da 5'9"
- Released: August 9, 2011
- Recorded: 2010–2011
- Genre: Hip-hop
- Length: 40:55
- Label: Gracie Productions; Orchard
- Producer: Tony Bucher (exec.); Dorian Washington (exec.); Eminem; Mr. Porter; DJ Premier; The Alchemist; Streetrunner; Nottz; The Futuristiks; Sarom

Royce da 5'9" chronology
Hell: The Sequel (2011)	Success Is Certain (2011)	PRhyme (2014)

Singles from Success Is Certain
- 1. "Writer's Block" Released: March 29, 2011; 2. "Second Place" Released: June 14, 2011; 3. "Legendary" Released: July 19, 2011

Success Is Certain is the fifth studio album by rapper Royce da 5'9" released on August 9, 2011. The first single is "Writer's Block" featuring Eminem, which was released in March 2011. Production for the album came from DJ Premier, Mr. Porter, Eminem, Nottz, Streetrunner, The Futuristiks and The Alchemist among others. Guest appearances include Eminem, Joe Budden, Kid Vishis and Travis Barker.

== Singles and promotion ==
The album artwork, track listing, and related promo art (such as a full-website "takeover" on RapRadar) was created by Brett Lindzen. The official artwork was revealed on July 4, 2011. The artwork depicts a black Rolls-Royce car parallel parked in front of the Detroit Savings Bank. The photo is in black and white. Instead of Royce da 5'9"'s full stage name, the cover shows only "R5'9"" with "Royce" written in smaller font below. The track list was revealed the same day with the availability for pre-order.

"Writer's Block" was announced to be the first single from Success Is Certain. It was released March 29, 2011, on iTunes. The song features Detroit rapper Eminem, but only on the hook. It is produced by Streetrunner and Raymond (SAROM) Diaz. Royce da 5'9" originally reached out to Eminem for this song. Later, they started recording for Bad Meets Evil's EP, Hell: The Sequel. It was confirmed that this would still be used on Royce's Success Is Certain. "Second Place" was released on June 14, 2011, as the second single from the album. It was produced by DJ Premier. There were rumors that Royce had originally planned for this song to feature Raekwon and Method Man, but did not because of the leak. Later this was confirmed false. "Legendary" was released on July 19, 2011, on iTunes as the third single from the album. All three singles from the album can be streamed at Royce's website.

== Commercial performance ==
The album debuted at number 25 on the Billboard 200 with 16,000 copies sold in its first week released. In its second week, the album sold 4,700 copies to bring in a total of 20,700 copies to date. As of March 20, 2012, the album has sold 43,500 copies in the United States.

== Reception ==
Professional ratings
Review scores
Source	Rating
The A.V. Club	(B)
AllMusic	4/5 stars
HipHopDX	4/5 stars
RapReviews	(8/10)
XXL	4/5 stars

Success Is Certain has received general acclaim from music critics. At Metacritic, which assigns a normalized rating out of 100 to reviews from mainstream critics, the album received an average score of 82, based on 5 reviews, which indicates "universal acclaim".

David Jeffries of Allmusic wrote, "Musically, the results are a brighter, tighter, yet more elaborate version of the man's best work, with tracks like "Security" and "Merry Go Round" sounding both flashy and meaty at once." Evan Rytlewski of The A.V. Club gave the album a "B" rating, writing "disorganized as it is, this is the environment he works best in, and Success smartly just lets him do his thing". Meka Udoh of XXL gave the album an "XL" review, writing "maybe influenced by Marshall himself, Royce has learned to channel his loquacious voracity into a controlled rage, and the end result is perhaps his most complete body of work".

== Track listing ==
No.	Title	Producer(s)	Length
1.	"Legendary" (featuring Travis Barker)	Eminem; The Futuristiks; Luis Resto	4:49
2.	"Writer's Block" (featuring Eminem)	Streetrunner; Sarom	4:35
3.	"Merry Go Round"	Nottz	2:40
4.	"Where My Money"	Streetrunner	3:14
5.	"ER" (featuring Kid Vishis)	Streetrunner	2:54
6.	"On the Boulevard" (featuring Nottz and Adonis)	Nottz	3:47
7.	"I Ain't Coming Down"	The Alchemist	3:44
8.	"Security"	Mr. Porter	3:39
9.	"Second Place"	DJ Premier	3:46
10.	"My Own Planet" (featuring Joe Budden and Mr. Porter)	Mr. Porter	3:36
11.	"I've Been Up, I've Been Down"	Mr. Porter	4:13

iTunes deluxe version
No.	Title	Producer(s)	Length
12.	"Rock That" (featuring Kid Vishis)	Mr. Porter	4:04
13.	"Writer's Block" (DJ Premier Remix) (featuring Eminem)	DJ Premier	4:47

Note

- The track 3 "Merry Go Round" is replaced by "I'm Fresh" featuring Mr. Porter on the iTunes album version.

== Chart history ==
Chart (2011)	Peak position
US Billboard 200	25
US Digital Albums (Billboard)	15
US Independent Albums (Billboard)	3
US Top R&B/Hip-Hop Albums (Billboard)	7
