= Tie Me Down (New Boyz song) =

- EP cover

Single by New Boyz featuring Ray J

from the album Skinny Jeanz and a Mic
- Released: August 31, 2009
- Recorded: 2009
- Genre: R&B; snap; hyphy
- Length: 2:57
- Label: Shotty; Asylum; Warner Bros.
- Songwriters: Dominic Thomas; Earl Benjamin; Jason Wilkinson
- Producer: Jay-Nari

New Boyz singles chronology
"You're a Jerk" (2009)	"Tie Me Down" (2009)	"Break My Bank" (2010)

Ray J singles chronology
"Sexy Ladies" (2009)	"Tie Me Down" (2009)	"143" (2010)

Tie Me Down is a song by American hip hop duo New Boyz. The song is the second single from their debut album Skinny Jeanz and a Mic, and features R&B singer Ray J. Ray J's chorus uses the Auto-Tune effect and there is also usage in the New Boyz' verses. Due to the success of the duo's first single, "You're a Jerk", an EP was released called Tie Me Down: EP via digital download featuring the track and four other songs that would later be included on their debut album.

The song peaked at number twenty-two on the Billboard Hot 100, becoming the duo's highest-charting single and second consecutive top thirty hit. It charted at number five and forty-two on the Hot R&B/Hip-Hop Songs and Rap Songs charts. The song fared better as the duo's first entry at pop radio, peaking at twenty-three on the Pop Songs.

The video ranked at #70 on BET's Notarized: Top 100 Videos of 2009 countdown.

== Background ==
The second single set to be released from the album was intended to be "Dot Com", but for unknown reasons, plans were changed. In an interview with HipHopDX.com, when asked about how the collaboration came about, Ray J said, "I met The New Boyz at the BET Awards and my little niece Sy’rai, she loves ['You're a Jerk'] so I wanted to meet them so I could have some credibility with my niece like 'Oh, I got The New Boyz' number and I’m about to call them over right now,' you know like that type of thing. So I got their number and they called me, then I called them and they asked me to do a record, and I said, 'Okay, send it over.' I heard it and it just went from there we worked out a little deal and we made it happen. The New Boyz member Legacy stated in an interview that he came up with the hook and Ben J said they were going to do the hook, but he felt that he and Legacy needed somebody big to sing the hook."

== Chart performance ==
The song entered the Billboard Hot 100 in the week labeled October 31, 2009 at number ninety-nine. On the week of November 28, 2009 the song moved up eight spots from number fifty-eight to number fifty. After seven weeks of moving up the chart, on the week ending December 26, 2009 the song climbed to number thirty-three. It eventually went on to peak at number twenty-two on the week labeled March 13, 2010.

== Track listing ==
- The Tie Me Down EP
1. "Tie Me Down" (featuring Ray J) - 2:57
2. "Cricketz" (featuring Tyga) - 3:25
3. "So Dope" - 3:00
4. "New Girl" (featuring D&D) - 3:29
- U.S. Promo CD
1. "Tie Me Down" (Radio Version) - 2:58
2. "Tie Me Down" (Instrumental) - 2:58
3. "Tie Me Down" (Explicit) - 2:58

== Music video ==
The Music video was filmed on August 17, 2009, directed and edited by Matt Alonzo.

== Charts ==
Weekly chart performance for "Tie Me Down"
Chart (2009–2010)	Peak position
US Billboard Hot 100	22
US Hot R&B/Hip-Hop Songs (Billboard)	42
US Hot Rap Songs (Billboard)	5
US Pop Airplay (Billboard)	23

=== Year-end charts ===
Year-end chart performance for "Tie Me Down"
Chart (2010)	Position
US Billboard Hot 100	65

== Release history ==
Release dates and formats for "Tie Me Down"
Region	Date	Format	Label(s)	Ref.
United States	January 12, 2010	Mainstream airplay	Warner Bros.	
