= Bass Down Low =

2010 single by Dev

Single by Dev featuring The Cataracs

from the album The Night the Sun Came Up
- Released: November 16, 2010
- Genre: Electro
- Length: 3:30
- Label: Universal Motown
- Songwriters: Devin Tailes; Niles Hollowell-Dhar; David Singer-Vine
- Producer: The Cataracs

Dev singles chronology
"Like a G6" (2010)	"Bass Down Low" (2010)	"Backseat" (2011)

The Cataracs singles chronology
"Like a G6" (2010)	"Bass Down Low" (2010)	"Backseat" (2011)

"Bass Down Low" is the debut solo single by American singer Dev. Written alongside producers The Cataracs, the song was released on November 16, 2010 through Universal Motown as the lead single from Dev's debut studio album, The Night the Sun Came Up (2011). Initially, the song was made for The Cataracs with Dev as the featured act, but she was made the main artist as they believed it would be a suitable follow-up to Far East Movement's "Like a G6", which Dev and The Cataracs appeared on. British rapper Tinie Tempah was featured on an official remix of "Bass Down Low" that was made for the song's release in the United Kingdom. Musically, "Bass Down Low" is an electro song with skittering synths and the lyrics speak of different forms of debauchery.

The song was met with positive reviews from critics. "Bass Down Low" performed moderately, peaking at number sixty one on the Billboard Hot 100 and number two on the Top Heatseekers chart. Outside of the United States, "Bass Down Low" peaked within the top ten of the charts in the United Kingdom, and the top 40 of the charts in Canada and the Republic of Ireland. The accompanying music video for "Bass Down Low" takes place in an underground club. The clip was directed by Ethan Lader who took inspiration from fashion and the film Fight Club.

== Background ==
In 2008, Dev recorded two songs using the software GarageBand on her MacBook that a friend posted onto her Myspace page. Production duo The Cataracs, consisting of Niles Hollowell-Dhar and David Singer-Vine, came across the songs and asked Dev to come to Berkeley, California to produce music with them. Six months later, the first song they made together, "2night", gained exposure on the television channel MTVU and local radio channels, which resulted in a debut on the Billboard Hot Dance Airplay chart. In 2009, Dev signed with Indie-Pop Records and moved to a loft in Los Angeles, California to begin working on her debut album. The Cataracs eventually made the beat for a song called "Booty Bounce". Afterwards, a hook was written for the song and The Cataracs suggested to interpolate it into a track they were making for Far East Movement. Dev agreed to what would become "Like a G6", and later said, "It ended up being a massive song and gave me so much experience and opportunity and it was absolutely beautiful. Thank god I agreed to that!" The song was released in April 2010 and reached the top ten on several charts worldwide, including the United States, where it reached the top position and sold over three million copies. In August 2010, Dev issued a viral music video for "Booty Bounce" and subsequently signed a record deal with Universal Republic two months later.

== Writing and release ==
"Bass Down Low" was written by Dev alongside the production duo The Cataracs. The duo also produced the song, and recorded it at The Indie-Pop Sweat Shop. It was later mixed by Manny Marroquin at Larrabee Studios and mastered by Tom Coyne at Sterling Sound in New York City. The song was originally conceived with Dev as a featured act, but she was later made the main artist as they believed it represented her. Dev described "Bass Down Low" as "sassy and fun" and considered it a great follow-up to "Like a G6". In an interview with teen magazine Seventeen, she spoke of the song's conception, stating: "We'd been in the studio writing some really bossy, fun stuff. We've got a studio in the loft that we live in together, so it was made in there. We were just kind of kickin' it and it came. There's one version where The Cataracs are just rapping on it, which I love as well."

"Bass Down Low" was sent for rhythmic airplay in the United States on November 16, 2010, one month after Dev signed her record deal with Universal Republic. It was later released digitally on December 6, 2010, and sent for mainstream airplay on January 11, 2011. An alternate version with The Cataracs as the main artists was released in a remix extended play (EP) on March 29, 2011. For the single's UK release, the track was remixed with guest vocals from British rapper Tinie Tempah. The remix was released as part of a digital EP on April 23, 2011. In an interview with Digital Spy in July 2011, Dev spoke about collaborating with Tempah, stating, "We actually did the duet over the internet as we're both really busy and it was through the management that I was introduced to him, but he buffed up my track pretty good! I haven't caught him live yet, but I've managed to see him on a couple of late night chatshows and he's doing an amazing job out there." The remix was released outside the UK on May 23, 2011, labeled "The U.K. Mix".

== Composition ==
"Bass Down Low"
A sample of "Bass Down Low", featuring skittering synths and a pulsating electro-hop groove.

"Bass Down Low" is an electro song with skittering synths and a pulsating electro hop groove. Dev utilizes her sing-talk vocal style throughout the song, but also uses her singing voice near the end. In the song's hook, she sing-talks in a "deadpan" delivery while remarking that "If you wanna get with me, there's some things you gotta know / I like my beats fast and my bass down low." According to Scott Shetler of AOL Radio, Dev entices listeners with lines such as, "Straight buzzin' Robotussin / Wanna get ya mitts in my oven? / Wanna get a lick of this lovin'?" The song includes a shout-out to The Black Eyed Peas while The Cataracs sing about a sexual promise: "giving you that Black Eyed Peas – you know, that 'Boom Boom Pow'". Lyrically, the song speaks of various forms of debauchery, such as taking shots.

== Critical reception ==
Ed Masley of The Arizona Republic recognized "Bass Down Low" as one of December 2010's best singles, placing it as number four on his "December's 10 best singles" list. He wrote, "The Black Eyed Peas may be the ones who earn the shout-out here. But every other element of 'Bass Down Low' feels custom-made for squeezing 15 extra minutes off that 'Tik Tok' clock." Masley praised the spoken-word intro, the song's electropop groove and Dev's "Valley Girl swagger" vocals. Masley concluded his review by writing that the song sounds "a whole lot" like Far East Movement's "Like a G6". About.com critic Ron Slomowicz wrote a positive review of the song and called it a "slinky, sleazy, sexy affair". Slomowicz wrote, "Dev proves she's got the cahones to challenge anyone on the scene with vulgar and seductive lyrics and a crazy hot beat provided by The Cataracs... With any justice, this track will dominate in 2011." While reviewing The Night the Sun Came Up, Jamie Horne of The Border Mail said that "Bass Down Low" and "In My Trunk" are "certainly Black Eyed Peas-esque but Dev... is no clone."

== Chart performance ==
In the United States, "Bass Down Low" debuted at number 94 on the Billboard Hot 100 chart on the issue dated December 25, 2010. The following week, it rose to number 74 but fell off the chart afterwards. On the issue dated January 15, 2011, the song re-entered the chart at number 99. It ascended for the next four weeks and reached its peak of number 61 on the issue dated February 12, 2011. The song also spent three non-consecutive weeks at number two on the Top Heatseekers chart. To date, the song has sold 443,000 downloads in the US, according to Nielsen SoundScan.

In Canada, "Bass Down Low" debuted at number 49 on the Canadian Hot 100 on the issue dated January 1, 2011 and was the week's highest new entry. The song later acquired its peak of number 35 on the issue dated February 12, 2011 and spent a total of 16 weeks on the chart.

In the United Kingdom, the song debuted at number 66 on the UK Singles Chart on May 1, 2011 – for the week ending date May 7, 2011. After having ascended on the chart for five weeks, the song peaked at number ten on June 12, 2011 – for the week ending date June 18, 2011 – becoming Dev's second top ten song in Britain following "Like a G6", her 2010 collaboration with Far East Movement.

In the Republic of Ireland, the song peaked at number 28 on the Irish Singles Chart.

== Music video ==
The music video includes scrolling shots in which all the party goers but Dev (middle) are standing completely still

The music video for "Bass Down Low" was directed by Ethan Lader and shot in a warehouse in downtown Los Angeles, California. Lader had previously directed the video for Dev's promotional single "Booty Bounce" (2010). The inspiration behind the "Bass Down Low" clip was "Fight Club meets high fashion", with Lader describing the approach as "sexiness, but it's effortless". The shoot marked the first time Dev worked with extras. She explained that she wanted the video to have an organic party energy. The video had its premiere on the music video site Vevo on December 2, 2010, and was later made available for digital download on the iTunes Store on December 7.

The video takes place at a party in an underground club where Dev gives out signals to the crowd when to dance. It also includes scenes of Dev and several other women standing against a wall while thrusting their chests out. The scenes are interspersed with shots of things being broken and a scrolling shot of people standing still like statues. Ron Slomowicz of About.com positively reviewed the video, calling it "pretty simple but fun".

== Track listings ==
- Digital download
1. "Bass Down Low" – 3:31
- Digital EP – The Remixes
1. "Bass Down Low" – 3:30
2. "Bass Down Low" (Static Revenger Remix) – 5:43
3. "Bass Down Low" (Proper Villains Remix) – 3:18
4. "Bass Down Low" (5K Remix Club) – 5:52
5. "Bass Down Low" (Performed by The Cataracs) – 3:37
- UK digital EP
1. "Bass Down Low" (Edited Version) – 3:28
2. "Bass Down Low" (Tinie Tempah Remix; clean) – 3:28
3. "Bass Down Low" (Tinie Tempah Remix; explicit) – 3:29
4. "Bass Down Low" (Static Revenger Remix) – 5:43
5. "Bass Down Low" (5K Remix Club) – 5:52
6. "Bass Down Low" (Music video) – 3:37
- The U.K. Mix
1. "Bass Down Low" (The U.K. Mix; featuring Tinie Tempah) – 3:28

== Credits and personnel ==
Recording

- Recorded at The Indie-Pop Sweat Shop

Personnel

- Songwriting – Devin Tailes, Niles Hollowell-Dhar, David Singer-Vine
- Production – Niles Hollowell-Dhar
- Recording – The Cataracs
- Mixing – Manny Marroquin
- Mastering – Tom Coyne

Credits adapted from The Night the Sun Came Up liner notes.

== Charts and certifications ==
=== Weekly charts ===
Chart (2010–2011)	Peak position
Australia (ARIA)	66
Australia Urban (ARIA)	24
Belgium (Ultratip Bubbling Under Flanders)	8
Canada Hot 100 (Billboard)	35
Ireland (IRMA)	28
Netherlands (Single Top 100)	92
Scotland Singles (OCC)	18
UK Singles (OCC)	10
US Billboard Hot 100	61
US Pop Airplay (Billboard)	35
US Heatseekers Songs (Billboard)	2

=== Year-end charts ===
Chart (2011)	Position
UK Singles (OCC)	99

=== Certifications ===
Region	Certification	Certified units/sales
United Kingdom (BPI)	Silver	200,000^{^}
^{^} Shipments figures based on certification alone.

== Radio add dates and release history ==
Region	Date	Format
United States	November 16, 2010	Rhythmic radio
Australia	December 6, 2010	Digital download
New Zealand	December 6, 2010	Digital download
United States	December 7, 2010	Digital download
United States	January 11, 2011	Mainstream radio
United States	March 29, 2011	Digital remix EP
Germany	April 22, 2011	Digital download
United Kingdom	April 24, 2011	Digital EP
United States	May 23, 2011	Remix download
