= Better with the Lights Off =

Single by New Boyz featuring Chris Brown

from the album Too Cool to Care
- Released: August 2, 2011
- Recorded: 2010
- Genre: Electro-hop; pop-rap
- Length: 3:42
- Label: Shotty • Asylum • Warner Bros.
- Songwriter: Dominic Thomas • Earl Benjamin • Christopher Brown
- Producer: The Cataracs • H-Money (co.)

New Boyz singles chronology
"Boyfriend" (2011)	"Better with the Lights Off" (2011)	"I Like It Like That" (2011)

Chris Brown singles chronology
"Body 2 Body" (2011)	"Better with the Lights Off" (2011)	"Wet the Bed" (2011)

"Better with the Lights Off" is a song written and recorded by American hip hop duo New Boyz and features vocals from R&B singer Chris Brown, taken from New Boyz' second studio album, Too Cool To Care. The song was released as a promotional single on May 3, 2011 via digital download in the United States and was released as the third single from the album on August 2, 2011.

== Critical response ==
Allmusic highlighted the song and wrote a positive opinion: "when “girl you look better with” ends up the big hook behind the Chris Brown feature “Better with the Lights Off,” it’s hard to think of a grander moment that the entire snotty-males-in-their-early-twenties movement has yet offered."

== Chart performance ==
The single debuted at number 61 on the Billboard Hot 100 as a promotional single. After being officially released, it re-entered the chart at number 75 and reached a peak of number 38.

== Music video ==
The official music video was filmed in Los Angeles on May 11, 2011. The video premiered on MTV on June 15, 2011. It was directed by Colin Tilley.

== Charts ==
Chart (2011)	Peak position
Australian Singles Chart	90
US Billboard Hot 100	38
US Pop Songs (Billboard)	23
US Rap Songs (Billboard)	13
US Rhythmic Airplay (Billboard)	4

=== Year-end charts ===
Chart (2011)	position
US Rhythmic (Billboard)	28

== Certifications ==
Region	Certification	Certified units/sales
United States (RIAA)	Platinum	1,000,000^{‡}
^{‡} Sales+streaming figures based on certification alone.
