= Wolftown Committee =

Wolftown Committee was a collaboration between hip hop artists on the Wolftown Recordings artist roster. The 10-pieces group included The Villains, Vicious Circle, Jai Boo, and Tricksta. They released their first single, Artform Technique (Original & Remix) / Could It Be in February 2002. This was followed by the 21 track LP Legendary Status later in the year. The album was followed by a 2003 single release, Boxed.

== Discography ==
Singles

- Artform Technique (Original & Remix) / Could It Be (2002) (Wolftown Recordings)
- Boxed (2003) (Wolftown Recordings)

Albums

- Legendary Status (2002) (Wolftown Recordings)
