= Writer's Block (Royce da 5'9" song) =

Single by Royce da 5'9" featuring Eminem

from the album Success Is Certain
- Released: March 29, 2011
- Recorded: 2010–11
- Genre: Hip hop
- Length: 4:35
- Label: Gracie Productions
- Songwriters: Ryan Montgomery; Marshall Mathers; Raymond Díaz; Steve Morales
- Producers: StreetRunner; Sarom Soundz (co.)

Royce da 5'9" singles chronology
"Vagina" (2010)	"Writer's Block" (2011)	"Second Place" (2011)

Eminem singles chronology
"I Need a Doctor" (2011)	"Writer's Block" (2011)	"Space Bound" (2011)

"Writer's Block" is the first single by Royce da 5'9" that was released on March 29, 2011. The song appears on his fifth studio album, Success Is Certain that was released on the record label Gracie Productions. The song features rapper Eminem, though he only sings the hook and speaks in the intro. It is produced by StreetRunner, and co-produced by Sarom Soundz. "Writer's Block" charted at #199 in the UK and #4 in the US on the Bubbling Under R&B/Hip-Hop Singles charts. "Writer's Block" is available as a digital download from iTunes, there is no CD single for the song however.

== Background ==
Royce da 5'9" originally reached out to Eminem for this song. Later, they started recording for Bad Meets Evil's first studio debut EP, Hell: The Sequel. Both Royce and Eminem were going to make this song a Bad Meets Evil collaboration for the EP, but it was later confirmed that "Writer's Block" would be used and is now currently on Royce's independent solo album, Success Is Certain.

== Critical response ==
Allmusic highlighted the song. Adam Fleischer was positive and he noted that Royce is trading ferocious bars with his Bad Meets Evil compatriot on the haunting "Writer’s Block."

== Music video ==
A music video to accompany the release of "Writer's Block" was first released onto YouTube on 20 August 2011 at a total length of four minutes and forty-six seconds. The music video shows Royce rapping near flame engulfed buildings and driving around the city of Detroit in a luxury car to a club during the first verse. When the second verse starts, Royce arrives at the club to perform in front of a large audience on stage. It is also noted that when the second verse starts, the music will switch to the "Writer's Block (DJ Premier Remix)" version. Eminem does not appear in the video.

== Track listing ==
Digital download

No.	Title	Writer(s)	Producer(s)	Length
1.	"Writer's Block" (featuring Eminem)	Ryan Montgomery; Marshall Mathers; Raymond Díaz; Steve Morales	StreetRunner; Sarom Soundz^{[a]}	4:35

Notes

- ^{^[a]} signifies a co-producer.

== Credits and personnel ==
- Lead vocals – Royce da 5'9" and Eminem
- Producers – StreetRunner, Sarom Soundz
- Lyrics – Ryan Montgomery, Marshall Mathers, Raymond Díaz
- Label: Gracie Productions

== Chart performance ==
"Writer's Block" charted at #199 on the UK Singles (The Official Charts Company) chart and No. 4 on the US Bubbling Under R&B/Hip-Hop Singles chart respectively in 2011.

Chart (2011)	Peak position
UK Singles (The Official Charts Company)	199
US Bubbling Under R&B/Hip-Hop Singles (Billboard)	4

== Release history ==
Region	Date	Format	Label
United Kingdom	29 March 2011	Digital Download	Gracie Productions
