= G-Side =

American hip hop group

- G-Side performing in 2011

Background information
- Origin: Huntsville, Alabama, U.S.
- Genre: Hip hop
- Years active: 1999–present
- Label: Slow Motion Soundz
- Members: ST 2 Lettaz; Yung Clova
- Website: g-side.bandcamp.com

G-Side is an American hip hop duo from Huntsville, Alabama. The group consists of ST 2 Lettaz (born Stephen Harris) and Yung Clova (born David Williams).

== History ==
ST 2 Lettaz and Yung Clova first met at the Boys & Girls Club in Athens, Alabama. In 1999, they formed G-Side. The duo connected with the production team Block Beattaz and got involved in the entertainment company Slow Motion Soundz.

G-Side's debut studio album, Sumthin 2 Hate, was released in 2007. It was followed by Starshipz and Rocketz (2008) and Huntsville International (2009). In 2011, the duo released The One...Cohesive, as well as Island.

In September 2012, it was announced that they had decided to part ways. However, their hiatus ended in November 2013.

The duo released Gz II Godz in 2014 and The 2 Cohesive in 2018.

== Style and influences ==
In a 2010 interview, G-Side cited 8Ball & MJG, Outkast, Ghetto Mafia, Geto Boys, Master P, and UGK as the influences on the duo's music.

== Discography ==
=== Studio albums ===
- Sumthin 2 Hate (2007)
- Starshipz and Rocketz (2008)
- Huntsville International (2009)
- The One...Cohesive (2011)
- Island (2011)
- Gz II Godz (2014)
- The 2 Cohesive (2018)

=== Live albums ===
- Live from the Parish (2010)

=== Singles ===
- "Relaxin'" (2010)
- "The Blackout" (2011)
- "Forever" (2013)

=== Guest appearances ===
- Lars Vaular - "Klokken fem om natten" from Helt om natten, helt om dagen (2010)
- Sinden - "G Like Me" (2011)
- Stevie Joe - "Bass" from 21.0 Grams (2011)
