= New Boyz =

American hip hop duo

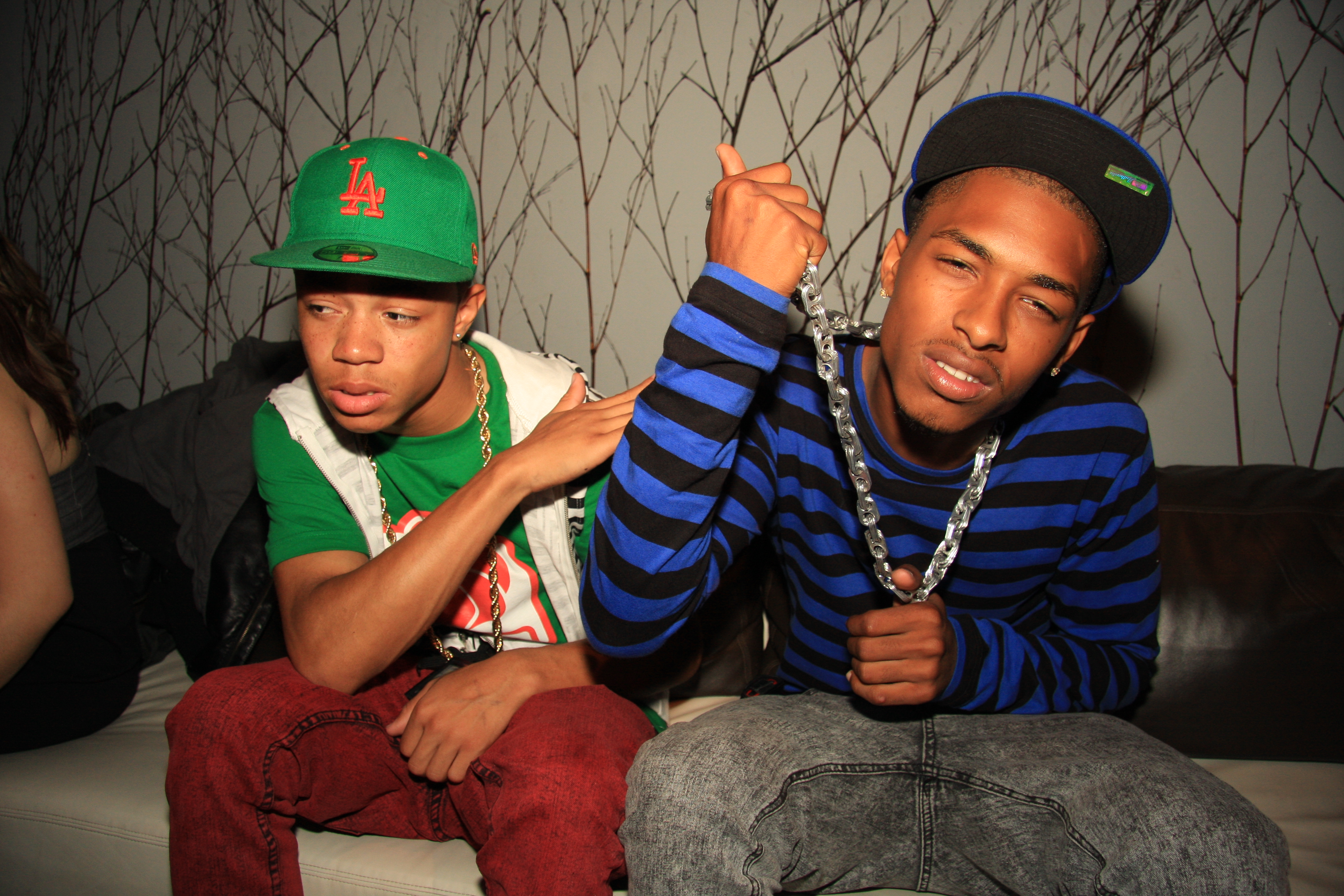
- Legacy (left) and Ben J in 2010

Background information
- Origin: Hesperia, California, U.S.
- Genre: Hip hop
- Years active: 2008–2013; 2022; 2026–present
- Labels: Asylum; Warner Bros.; Shotty
- Members: Dominic "Legacy" Thomas; Earl "Ben J" Benjamin

New Boyz are an American hip hop duo consisting of rappers Earl "Ben J" Benjamin (born October 13, 1991) and Dominic "Legacy" Thomas (born October 12, 1991). They debuted in the spring of 2009 with their viral hit "You're a Jerk" taken from their 2009 debut studio album Skinny Jeanz and a Mic. The song peaked in the top thirty of the Billboard Hot 100, and it was the first song to bring the jerkin' style to the national forefront. A second single, "Tie Me Down" featuring Ray J, was also successful and peaked in the top thirty in early 2010. In May 2011, their second and final studio album, Too Cool to Care, was released. It includes the top 40 hits "Backseat", featuring The Cataracs and Dev, and "Better with the Lights Off" featuring Chris Brown. The New Boyz have also been featured on Hot Chelle Rae's song "I Like It Like That", which peaked at No. 28 on the Hot 100.

== History ==
=== 2005–2008: Early life and formation ===
Benjamin and Thomas met as freshmen at Hesperia High School. The two were originally rivals, but became friends over a common interest in music. Thomas began rapping at the age of eight after watching a music video by Bow Wow, but Benjamin did not have plans to pursue a musical career, instead, he intended to play football at San Diego State University. However, Benjamin decided to focus more on music after he discovered that he had a passion for rapping. With their October birthdays only a day apart, they pooled their gift money to buy recording equipment. Thomas then taught himself how to make beats for the group's songs with a computer program called Fruity Loops, saying "I had to teach myself. We didn't want to pay for beats." After Thomas transferred to a new school in May 2008, they decided to form a group. With Benjamin being "Ben J" and Thomas being "Legacy", they began performing together as the Swagger Boyz on July 4, 2008 and created a MySpace page to promote their self-published single "Colorz".

=== 2009–2012: Skinny Jeanz and a Mic and Too Cool to Care ===
In the summer of 2009, the New Boyz' single "You're a Jerk", based on the local dance style of jerkin', became a national hit. "You're a Jerk" peaked on No. 24 on the Billboard Hot 100 and No. 4 on the Hot Rap Tracks charts. The New Boyz' debut album Skinny Jeanz and a Mic was released in September 2009. Released by Shotty and Asylum Records, the album peaked at No. 56 on the Billboard 200 and No. 8 on the Top Rap Albums charts. "Tie Me Down", featuring Ray J, was the second single from the New Boyz' debut album; that song contained Auto-Tune. "Tie Me Down" peaked at No. 22 on the Hot 100 and No. 5 on the Hot Rap Tracks.

In July 2010, New Boyz collaborated with Virgin Islands singer Iyaz on the song "Break My Bank", which peaked at number 68 on the Billboard Hot 100. New Boyz released their second studio album, Too Cool to Care, on May 17, 2011. On the album, the duo planned to focus less on the "jerkin'" aspect of the music, instead emphasizing more diverse influences. Legacy stated that on the previous album, listeners "were more focused on these dudes wearing skinny jeans, 'they are making jerk stuff,' so that's why we made sure on this second album, we let it be known that we can go in." The group planned to experiment with other genres besides hip-hop, including rock. On February 15, 2011, New Boyz released their second single off the album "Backseat", which the song features The Cataracs and Dev. On May 7, 2011 Too Cool to Care was released it sold 30,000 copies in the first week. The third single off the album was "Better with the Lights Off" which featured Chris Brown, The single debuted at number 61 on the Billboard Hot 100 as a promotional single. After being officially released, it re-entered the chart at number 75 and reached a peak of number 38.

=== 2013–2014: Hiatus and reunion ===
On February 28, 2013, Legacy announced via Twitter that the group had been working on their third album for Warner Music Bros. Records. However, on November 9, 2013, after many speculations that the group has gone their separate ways, member Earl "Ben J" Benjamin officially stated they have decided to split up in order to pursue solo careers. He stated in an interview: "We've shared our talents with the world as a duo and had a very successful career in doing so, our songs stayed on the charts and our videos always received millions and millions of organic views on YouTube and Vevo. But after selling out shows and touring all over the world, we've decided that we'd like to share our talents with our fans individually. Together or apart; we've made our mark in American music history and our imprint will never be forgotten. I wish my brother (Legacy) the best in all that he does, and can’t wait till we're both at the Grammy's getting nominated for our solo efforts; and so begins a New chapter, in a New book; with this New Boy." The group reunited in the 2014 film "School Dance".

=== 2021–2022: Brief reunion ===
On January 18, 2022, the duo released the sequel to their 2009 hit song You're a Jerk; after teasing the group's return in December 2021.

=== 2026: Comeback ===
On August 29 2026, Legacy and Ben J reunited publicly for the first time in a decade in Los Angeles radio station Power 106, teasing upcoming projects and possible full return for the duo. Following the interview, the duo appeared at ComplexCon on October 4 2026, where there were spotted filming a new music video and performing choreography with fans to their breakthrough hit, "You're a jerk.". On October 23 2026, New Boyz released their new single "Back", making it their first single release in 14 years.

== Legal issues ==
On July 9, 2012, it was announced that New Boyz were being sued in a legal dispute due to a copyright issue over their name being similar to the Christian rock band, Newsboys, after confusion caused by the groups' names.

== Discography ==
=== Studio albums ===
List of albums, with selected chart positions
Title	Album details	Peak chart positions			Certifications
Title	Album details	US	US R&B	US Rap	Certifications
Skinny Jeanz and a Mic	Release date: September 15, 2009; Label: Shotty, Asylum Records; Format: CD, music download	56	12	8	RIAA: Gold
Too Cool to Care	Released date: May 17, 2011; Label: Shotty, Asylum Records; Format: CD, music download	41	9	7	

=== Mixtapes ===
New Boy'z mixtapes and details
Title	Mixtape details
Foolie Tape	Released: April 1, 2012

=== Singles ===
List of singles, with selected chart positions and certifications, showing year released and album name
Title	Year	Peak chart positions								Certifications	Album
Title	Year	US	US R&B	US Rap	US Pop	AUS	CAN	NZ	UK	Certifications	Album
"You're a Jerk"	2009	24	13	4	—	—	—	—	—	RIAA: Platinum	Skinny Jeanz and a Mic
"Tie Me Down" (featuring Ray J)	2009	22	42	5	23	—	—	—	—	RIAA: Platinum	Skinny Jeanz and a Mic
"Break My Bank" (featuring Iyaz)	2010	68	63	10	—	67	—	—	—		Too Cool to Care
"Spot Right There" (featuring Teairra Marí)	2010	—	—	—	—	—	—	—	—		Non-album single
"Backseat" (featuring The Cataracs and Dev)	2011	26	—	12	17	89	52	30	55	RIAA: Platinum	Too Cool to Care
"Better with the Lights Off" (featuring Chris Brown)	2011	38	—	13	23	90	—	—	—	RIAA: Platinum	Too Cool to Care
"FM$"	2012	108	33	—	—	—	—	—	—		Foolie Tape
"Skinny Jeanz"	2014	—	—	—	—	—	—	—	—		Non-album singles
"You're a Jerk 2"	2022	—	—	—	—	—	—	—	—		Non-album singles
"Back"	2026	—	—	—	—	—	—	—	—		Non-album singles
"—" denotes a recording that did not chart or was not released in that territory.

=== Promotional singles ===
List of singles, with chart positions and certifications
Title	Year	Album
"Colorz"	2008	Skinny Jeanz and a Mic
"Crush On You" (featuring YG)	2011	Too Cool to Care
"Tough Kids" (featuring Sabi)	2011	Too Cool to Care
"—" denotes releases that did not chart.

=== As featured artist ===
List of singles, with selected chart positions, showing year released and album name
Title	Year	Peak chart positions			Certifications	Album
Title	Year	US	US Pop	CAN	Certifications	Album
"Are You Feeling Me?" (Keisha Liu featuring New Boyz)	2009	—	—	—		Non-album single
"Dancin' Around the Truth" (The Stunners featuring New Boyz)	2009	—	—	—		The Stunners
"I Like It Like That" (Hot Chelle Rae featuring New Boyz)	2011	28	15	59	RIAA: Platinum; ARIA: 2× Platinum; RMNZ: Platinum	Whatever
"Sex" (Colette Carr featuring New Boyz)	2011	—	—	—		Skitszo
"Boyfriend" (Big Time Rush featuring New Boyz)	2011	—	—	—		Non-album singles
"I'm on a Roll" (Stefano featuring New Boyz and Rock Mafia)	2012	—	—	—		Non-album singles
"—" denotes items that did not chart or were not released.

=== Music videos ===
- You're a Jerk
- Dot Com
- Tie Me Down featuring Ray J
- So Dope
- Found My Swag featuring The Bangz
- Cricketz featuring Tyga
- Break My Bank featuring Iyaz
- Crush On You featuring YG
- Backseat featuring The Cataracs and Dev
- Tough Kids featuring Sabi
- Better With the Lights Off featuring Chris Brown
- Dancing Around the Truth (the Stunners)
- New Kid Swag featuring Brandon Soo-Hoo from Incredible Crew
- Hot Chelle Rae - I Like It Like That ft. New Boyz
- FM$
- Stefano - I'm on a Roll ft. Rock Mafia, New Boyz
- Tydis - Make Me Say Feat New Boyz

== Filmography ==
=== Films ===
Year	Title	Role	Notes
2012	We the Party	As H-One & Stunner	Support role
2014	School Dance	Themselves	Support role
