= Backseat (song) =

Single by New Boyz featuring the Cataracs and Dev

from the album Too Cool to Care
- B-side: "Tough Kids"
- Released: February 15, 2011
- Recorded: 2010
- Genre: Hip house
- Length: 3:44
- Label: Shotty; Asylum; Warner Bros.
- Songwriters: Dominic Thomas; Earl Benjamin; Niles Hollowell Dhar; David Singer Vine; Devin Tailes
- Producer: The Cataracs

New Boyz singles chronology
"Break My Bank" (2010)	"Backseat" (2011)	"Boyfriend" (2011)

The Cataracs singles chronology
"Bass Down Low" (2010)	"Backseat" (2011)	"Top of the World" (2011)

Dev singles chronology
"Bass Down Low" (2010)	"Backseat" (2011)	"Top of the World" (2011)

"Backseat" is a song written and recorded by American hip hop duo New Boyz featuring American production duo the Cataracs and American singer Dev. The song was released as a single on February 15, 2011 as a digital download in the United States and served as the second single from New Boyz' second album Too Cool to Care. The song contains elements of hip hop, house, electropop, and dance music and contains use of Auto-Tune on some of the vocals.

== Music video ==
A music video was directed by Jake Davis. It was premiered on March 7, 2011. It features appearances by featured artist Dev in shiny glittering dress, which changes into a white-and-pink dress with a quarter of a pyramid and The Cataracs. The first few scenes were shot with a silver Mercedes-Benz 300SL, with appearance by all artists. The scene changes to a "party in a club" scene after the second chorus, and the back seats of a car, given the title of the song. It ends with New Boyz being covered by the shadows. Ironically, the music video contains cars that actually don't feature back seats as well as a Mustang in place of the Camaro that is not orange. Also in the video, car miniatures were used to create an illusion of it being full-scale models.

== Track listing ==
- iTunes released "Backseat" as a deluxe single.

Deluxe single

No.	Title	Writer(s)	Producer(s)	Length
1.	"Backseat" (featuring The Cataracs & Dev)	Dominic Anthony Thomas, Earl Henry Benjamin, Niles Hollowell Dhar, David Singer Vine, Devin Tailes	The Cataracs	3:44
2.	"Backseat" (Instrumental Version)		The Cataracs	3:44

== Charts ==
"Backseat" debuted at #37 on the Billboard Hot 100 and has peaked at #26 in its twelfth week, becoming the duo's third top forty hit in the United States. As of July 2011, the song has now sold over 1,000,000 digital copies.

Chart (2011)	Peak position
Australia (Australian Singles Chart)	89
Belgium (Ultratip Bubbling Under Flanders)	44
Canada (Canadian Hot 100)	52
New Zealand (Recorded Music NZ)	28
Scotland Singles (OCC)	56
UK Singles (OCC)	55
UK Hip Hop/R&B (OCC)	16
US Billboard Hot 100	26
US Pop Songs (Billboard)	17
US Rap Songs (Billboard)	12
US Rhythmic Airplay (Billboard)	5

=== Year-end charts ===
Chart (2011)	Position
US Billboard Hot 100	84
US Rhythmic (Billboard)	22

== Release history ==
Release dates and formats for "Backseat"
Region	Date	Format	Label(s)	Ref.
United States	February 22, 2011	Mainstream airplay	Warner Bros.	
