= The One...Cohesive =

Studio album by G-Side
- Released: January 1, 2011
- Genre: Hip-hop
- Length: 56:46
- Label: Slow Motion Soundz
- Producers: A-Team; Block Beataz; Clams Casino; DJ Burn One; Str8 Drop

G-Side chronology
Huntsville International (2009)	The One...Cohesive (2011)	Island (2011)

The One...Cohesive is the fourth studio album by the American hip-hop duo G-Side. It was released by Slow Motion Soundz on January 1, 2011.

== Critical reception ==
Professional ratings
Aggregate scores
Source	Rating
Metacritic	82/100
Review scores
Source	Rating
Cokemachineglow	81/100
Exclaim!	favorable
HipHopDX	4.0/5
Pitchfork	8.1/10
RapReviews	9/10

At Metacritic, which assigns a weighted average score out of 100 to reviews from mainstream critics, the album received an average score of 82, based on 6 reviews, indicating "universal acclaim".

Spin placed it at number 8 on the "50 Best Albums of 2011" list. Cokemachineglow placed it at number 24 on the "Top 50 Albums 2011" list. Pitchfork included it on the "Overlooked Records 2011" list.

== Track listing ==
All music is composed by Block Beataz and co-produced by Str8 Drop, A-Team, Basmo, and Open Box Music Group.

No.	Title	Producer(s)	Length
1.	"Shots Fired" (featuring Codie Global)	A-Team	4:00
2.	"Came Up" (featuring S.L.A.S.H.)	Block Beataz	3:55
3.	"Y U Mad" (featuring P.H. and Kristmas)	Block Beataz	4:57
4.	"Im Sorry :(" (featuring P.H.)	A-Team	4:34
5.	"Inner Circle" (featuring CP)	Block Beataz	2:36
6.	"Jones" (featuring P.O.P.E.)	Block Beataz	4:58
7.	"Nat Geo" (featuring Chris Lee)	Block Beataz	4:24
8.	"I Am" (featuring DJ Cunta)	A-Team	2:09
9.	"Pictures" (featuring G-Mane)	Clams Casino	4:02
10.	"Never" (featuring Mic Strange)	Block Beataz	4:00
11.	"No Radio" (featuring Bentley)	DJ Burn One	4:20
12.	"How Far" (featuring Victoria Tate and Kaylan Parham)	Block Beataz	3:25
13.	"MoneyintheskyII" (featuring Chris Lee)	A-Team	4:39
14.	"Imagine" (featuring Jhi Ali)	Str8 Drop	2:29
15.	"Relaxin'" (featuring G-Mane)	G-Side	3:00
Total length:			56:46
