= Hot Chelle Rae discography =

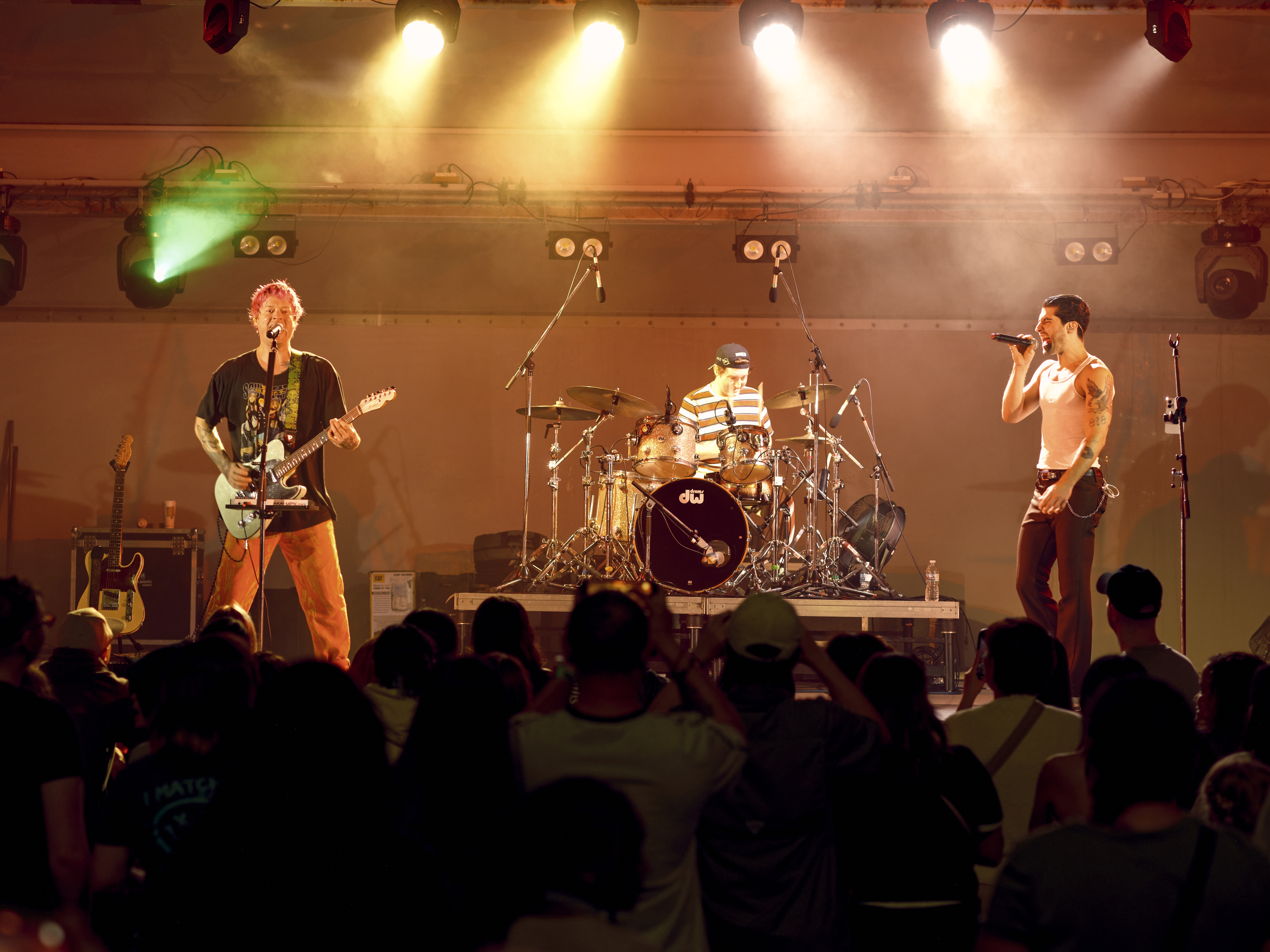
- Hot Chelle Rae performing live.
- Studio albums: 2
- EPs: 4
- Singles: 20
- Music videos: 10

American pop rock band Hot Chelle Rae have released two studio albums, four extended play, 20 singles and 10 music videos. Their debut album Lovesick Electric was released in October 2009 through Jive Records and failed to chart. Its second single "Bleed" reached the top 40 on Billboard's Pop Songs chart. The band achieved commercial success after the release of their 2011 studio album Whatever, which produced the international hits "Tonight Tonight" and "I Like It Like That".

The band released one EP, Masquerade, under the name of Miracle Drug, but the album, a collection of demos, did not chart.

== Albums ==
Title	Album details	Peak chart positions					Sales	Certifications
Title	Album details	US	AUS	CAN	JPN	NZ	Sales	Certifications
Lovesick Electric	Release date: October 23, 2009; Label: Jive; Formats: CD, download	—	—	—	—	—		
Whatever	Release date: November 29, 2011; Label: RCA; Formats: CD, download	48	21	166	26	21	US: 18,000	RMNZ: Platinum
"—" denotes a recording that did not chart or was not released in that territory.

== Extended plays ==
List of extended plays, with selected chart positions
Title	EP details	Peak chart positions
Title	EP details	US Heat
Masquerade (as Miracle Drug)	Released: August 2008; Label: Self-released; Formats: CD	—
Tonight Tonight	Released: June 21, 2011; Label: Jive; Formats: CD, download	8
Recklessly	Released: October 1, 2014; Label: RCA; Formats: CD, download	—
Tangerine	Released: April 10, 2020; Label: Artbeatz	—
"—" denotes a recording that did not chart or was not released in that territory.

== Singles ==
=== As lead artists ===
Title	Year	Peak chart positions										Sales	Certifications	Album
Title	Year	US	US Pop	US Adult	AUS	BEL (Fl) Tip	CAN	CIS	JPN	NLD	NZ	Sales	Certifications	Album
"I Like to Dance"	2009	—	—	—	— (Note: "I Like to Dance" did not enter the ARIA Singles Chart, but peaked at number 19 on the ARIA Hitseekers Chart.)	—	—	—	—	—	—			Lovesick Electric
"Bleed"	2010	—	31	—	—	—	—	—	—	—	—			Lovesick Electric
"Tonight Tonight"	2011	7	5	1	7	6	10	—	5	16	16	WW: 3,000,000; US: 271,000	RIAA: 2× Platinum; ARIA: 3× Platinum; MC: Platinum; RMNZ: 2× Platinum	Whatever
"I Like It Like That" (featuring New Boyz)	2011	28	15	18	17	7	59	—	15	73	9		RIAA: Platinum; ARIA: 2× Platinum; RMNZ: Platinum	Whatever
"Honestly"	2012	— (Note: "Honestly" did not enter Billboard Hot 100, but peaked at number 20 on the Bubbling Under Hot 100 Chart.)	30	—	—	64	—	—	—	—	—			Whatever
"Jingle Bell Rock"	2012	—	—	—	—	—	—	—	—	—	—			Non-album single
"Hung Up"	2013	—	35	—	—	—	—	191	—	—	—			Recklessly
"Don't Say Goodnight"	2014	—	33	—	—	—	—	—	—	—	—			Recklessly
"I Hate LA"	2019	—	—	40	—	—	—	—	—	—	—			Tangerine
"Tangerine"	2020	—	—	—	—	—	—	—	—	—	—			Tangerine
"Stay"	2020	—	—	—	—	—	—	—	—	—	—			Tangerine
"Tomorrow Me"	2020	—	—	—	—	—	—	—	—	—	—			Tangerine
"B.O.R.E.D."	2020	—	—	—	—	—	—	—	—	—	—			Non-album singles
"Find You"	2020	—	—	—	—	—	—	—	—	—	—			Non-album singles
"Come My Way"	2020	—	—	—	—	—	—	—	—	—	—			Non-album singles
"Tonight Tonight" (COVID Remix)	2021	—	—	—	—	—	—	—	—	—	—			Non-album singles
"Tonight Tonight" (10th Anniversary Remastered Version)	2021	—	—	—	—	—	—	—	—	—	—			Non-album singles
"Do the Damn Thing" (with Chord Overstreet and Levi)	2021	—	—	—	—	—	—	—	—	—	—			Non-album singles
"Heart and Mine"	2021	—	—	—	—	—	—	—	—	—	—			Non-album singles
"Stupid Song"	2022	—	—	—	—	—	—	—	—	—	—			Non-album singles
"—" denotes a recording that did not chart or was not released in that territory.

=== Other charted songs ===
Title	Year	Peak chart positions	Album
Title	Year	US Pop Dig. Sales	Album
"Why Don't You Love Me" (featuring Demi Lovato)	2011	47	Whatever

=== B sides ===
Title	Year	Album
"World We'll Never Find"	2009	non-album B-side
"Heart Hurts"	2010	non-album B-side

=== As featured artist ===
Title	Year	Album
"High Maintenance" (John Oates feat. Hot Chelle Rae)	2013	Non-album single

== Music videos ==
- "I Like to Dance" (2009)
- "Bleed" (2010)
- "Tonight Tonight" (2011)
- "I Like It Like That" (2011)
- "Honestly" (2012)
- "Whatever" (2012)
- "Hung Up" (2013)
- "Recklessly" (2013)
- "Don't Say Goodnight" (2014)
- "I Hate LA" (2020)
- "Stay" (2020)
- "Too Much" (2020)
- "Come My Way (Acoustic) (2020)
