= Megan and Liz discography =

This is the discography of American duo Megan and Liz.

== Extended plays ==
List of extended plays
Title	Album details	Peak chart positions	
Title	Album details	US Heat	US Inde
All of Our Boyfriends	Released: December 9, 2009; Label: Independent; Formats: Digital download	—	—
A Twinning Christmas	Released: November 15, 2011; Label: Collective Sounds; Formats: Digital download	—	—
This Time	Released: February 20, 2012; Label: Collective Sounds; Formats: Digital download	—	—
Bad for Me	Released: November 18, 2012; Label: Collective Sounds; Formats: Digital download	11	49
Simple Life	Released: June 3, 2014; Label: Hidden Cow, Inc.; Formats: CD, digital download	—	—
Deux	Released: March 11, 2016; Label: Hidden Cow, Inc.; Formats: CD, digital download	—	—
Muses	Released: May 3, 2019; Label: Hidden Cow, Inc.; Formats: Digital download	—	—

== Singles ==
Title	Year	Peak chart positions	Album
Title	Year	US Pop	Album
"6th Sense"	2008	—	Non-album singles
"Need Your Poison" (featuring Memphis High)	2010	—	Non-album singles
"All We Have Again"	2010	—	Non-album singles
"Happy Never After"	2011	—	This Time
"Rest of You"	2011	—	Non-album singles
"Maybe, Possibly 2.0"	2011	—	Non-album singles
"Here I Go"	2011	—	Non-album singles
"Run Away"	2011	—	This Time
"World's Gunna End"	2011	—	This Time
"Are You Happy Now?"	2011	—	This Time
"Old School Love"	2011	—	This Time
"A Girl's Life"	2012	—	This Time
"Long Distance"	2012	—	Non-album single
"Bad for Me"	2012	34	Bad for Me
"Release You"	2013	—	Non-album singles
"In the Shadows Tonight"	2013	—	Non-album singles
"Back Home"	2013	—	Non-album singles
"Happy Birthday"	2014	—	Non-album singles
"All the Way"	2015	—	Non-album singles
"That Ghost"	2015	—	Deux
"Almost"	2016	—	Non-album singles
"Thank God for December"	2016	—	Non-album singles
"Habit"	2017	—	Non-album singles
"Handsome"	2017	—	Non-album singles
"Hand On Mine"	2018	—	Non-album singles
"Take Me"	2019	—	Muses
"Who Are You" (featuring Bhavior)	2019	—	Muses
"Where Does the Love Go"	2021	—	Non-album singles

== Covers ==
Year	Title	Original artist
2011	"Rhythm of Love"	Plain White T's
2011	"Grenade"	Bruno Mars
2011	"Just a Kiss"	Lady Antebellum
2011	"Hummingbird Heartbeat"	Katy Perry
2011	"California King Bed"	Rihanna
2011	"How to Love"	Lil Wayne
2011	"Best Thing I Never Had"	Beyoncé
2011	"Skyscraper"	Demi Lovato
2011	"Love You Like a Love Song	Selena Gomez & the Scene
2011	"Wannabe" (feat. Tiffany Alvord)	Spice Girls
2011	"Stereo Hearts"	Gym Class Heroes
2012	"I Like It Like That"	Hot Chelle Rae
2012	"Domino"	Jessie J
2012	"Good Girl"	Carrie Underwood
2012	"Honestly"	Hot Chelle Rae
2012	"Payphone"	Maroon 5
2012	"Lights"	Ellie Goulding
2012	"Want U Back"	Cher Lloyd
2013	"Oh Holy Night"	Adolphe Adam
2018	"Silent Night"	Joseph Mohr

== Music videos ==
Year	Video
2011	"Happy Never After"
2011	"Rest Of You"
2011	"Run Away"
2011	"World's Gunna End"
2011	"Are You Happy Now?"
2012	"Old School Love"
2012	"A Girl's Life"
2012	"Princess Charming"
2012	"Long Distance"
2012	"Bad For Me"
2013	"Release You"
2013	"In The Shadows Tonight"
2014	"Simple Life"
2016	"Big Kids"
2016	"Home Is You"
2019	"Take Me"
2019	"Who Are You (Featuring Bhavior)"
2021	"Where Does the Love Go"
