= Happily Never After =

Happily Never After or Happy Never After may refer to:

== Literature ==
- Happily Never After, a 2008 report by the Parents Television and Media Council
- Happily Never After, a 2008 Night Huntress story by Jeanienne Frost
- Happily Never After: Modern Cautionary Tales, a book by Mitchell Symons
- Vanessa - Happily Never After, a 2022 novel featuring Ursula from Disney's Little Mermaid universe
- Happy Never After, a 1995 Callahan Garrity mystery novel by Mary Kay Andrews (as Kathy Hogan Trocheck)
- Happy Never After, a 2014 short-story collection by Roy Tsui

== Songs ==
- "Happily Never After", by the Backstreet Boys, a non-album track from Unbreakable, 2007
- "Happily Never After", by King Creosote from Stinks, 2000
- "Happily Never After", by the Pussycat Dolls from Doll Domination, 2008
- "Happily Never After", a remix by Pleasurecraft of the Nervo song "You're Gonna Love Again", 2011
- "첫 사랑의 법칙 (Happily never after)", by ONF from We Must Love, 2019
- "Happy Never After", by Megan and Liz, 2011
- "Happy Never After", by Sabbat from Dreamweaver, 1989
- "Happy Never After", by Suicidal Tendencies from World Gone Mad, 2010

== Television episodes ==
- "Happily Never After" (CSI: NY), 2008
- "Happily Never After" (His Storyy), 2021
- "Happily Never After" (The Immortal), 2001
- "Happily Never After" (Mysticons), 2018
- "Happily Never After" (The Real Housewives of Orange County), 2012
- "Happily Never After" (Yu-Gi-Oh! GX), 2006

== Other uses ==
- Happily N'Ever After, a 2006 animated film
- Happily Never After, a 1960 stage musical by Brownbrokers
- Happy Never After, a 2014 political campaign by artist-activist Saint Hoax
- Happily Never After, a 2012 crime television series aired on Investigation Discovery

== See also ==
- Never Happy, Ever After, a 2015 album by As It Is
- Once Upon a Time... Happily Never After, a 2022 Spanish musical comedy TV series
- "Sadly Never After", a 2018 story arc in the Image Comics series I Hate Fairyland
- "Sadly Ever After", a 2009 song by Abstract Rule from Rejuvenation
- "Sadly Ever After", a 2003 song by Mickey Gilley from Invitation Only
- "Sadly Ever After", a 1991 song by Collin Raye from All I Can Be
- Inside Out: Sadly Ever After, a 2015 Disney novel by Elise Allen
- Unhappily Ever After, a 1990s American sitcom
- Neverafter, the 16th season of Dimension 20
- Happily Ever After (disambiguation)
- Happy Ever After (disambiguation)
- Ever After (disambiguation)
