= Michael Leavitt (artist) =

American artist (born 1977)

Mike Leavitt
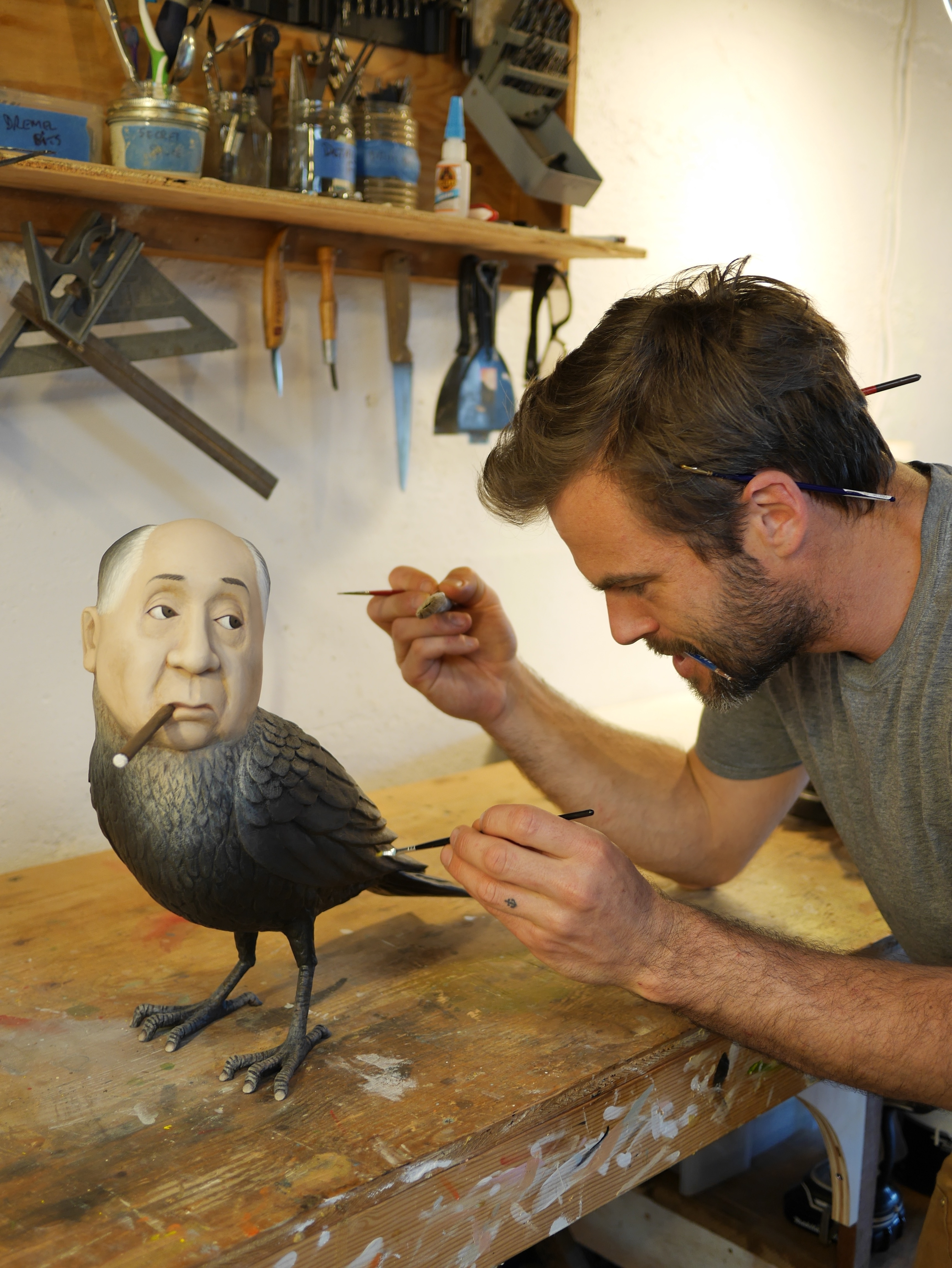
- Born: Michael Gipson Leavitt; November 4, 1977 (age 48); Seattle, Washington, U.S.
- Known for: sculpture, painting, installation art, art toys, action figures, puppetry, trading cards
- Movement: Conceptual art, Pop art, Interactive art, Urban art, Low brow, Performance art

Mike Leavitt (born November 4, 1977) is an American visual artist based near Seattle, Washington known for a variety of pop art, fine art and satirical works in multimedia. Leavitt "blends art, design and social commentary" with his cardboard shoes, handmade statues of cultural icons, and other projects. Inspired to honor his 11th-generation American citizenship inherited from John Leavitt (1608–1691), Leavitt's political work is reproduced by the Brooklyn, NY toy company 'FCTRY'.

== Background ==
Growing up in the Pacific Northwest, Leavitt was influenced by the wood-craft and engineering of Native American, Scandinavian, and industrial craft in the region. His parents practiced education, graphic design and environmentalism, formulating Leavitt's early interests in both art and sociology. As a child he taught himself to build miniature hydroplanes in balsa wood. "My mom had some drawing skills, she started as a graphic designer at Boeing," Leavitt says, "I would have her draw my action figures, and I would watch her draw." He attended The Pratt Institute in New York in 1996–97.

"I thought I wanted to be an art teacher, or maybe a graphic designer when I entered school. But I realized neither of these fields would allow me the freedom and flexibility I wanted in my life and career." During this time "Leavitt began crafting a motley variety of apartment friendly, pop-cult-themed art after dropping out of Pratt to avoid working for whoever passes for 'The Man' in the art world." (Thrillist.com) "I left school, took a year off, traveled and self-produced my own art shows at the age of 19. After that year 'off', I realized I wanted to try making a career of it, found a college that suited my ambitions, and went for it." Leavitt then completed a self-designed Bachelor of Arts at The Evergreen State College in Olympia, WA.

While Leavitt developed a set of conceptual art pieces before and after finishing college, he also converted a central Seattle art studio into a self-produced retail gallery space. His "Intuition Kitchen ArtShop" sold his first trading cards and hand-made action figures. It closed in 2004 as Leavitt started showed his work in retail art galleries and branching into commercial outlets for his art. Since then Leavitt has continued his professional career and community activism.

== 1999–2008 Portable Homeless Shelters ==
M.Leavitt, Portable Homeless Shelters @ 1999 Tent City

Just prior to the 1999 Seattle WTO protests, Leavitt built three small, wheeled housing units to be used by tent cities for the homeless. The first two units, made from salvaged pallet wood and recycled materials, served Seattle area tent cities for 3 years to follow. "As the homeless faced the threat of street sweeps during WTO, Leavitt's creations were used as a 'honeymoon sweet' [sic] for one couple, and as a headquarters for the Seattle Housing and Resource Effort (SHARE). Log cabins for the homeless? It is an odd invention indeed. But it may also be a solutions of sorts for homelessness in Seattle."(Real Change) To improve on his first designs, Leavitt built a third unit in 2001 using vinyl siding scraps salvaged from construction debris. Though designed as a domestic dwelling, the unit was used for 7 years as secure storage and nighttime security posts in the tent cities until it was dismantled in 2008.

== 1999-2026 "Push Button Performer" ==
M.Leavitt, Push Button Performer @ 2000 Seattle

Initially developed from 1999 to 2005, "Push Button Performer" is Leavitt's cabaret-style, interactive performance art piece that involves audience confrontations in public while "a panel of buttons lets attendees control a quirky robo-human beatnik through spoken word, music, and playful interruptions."

Expanding on the original parody of turn-of-the-century technological devices, the "Push Button Performer" has been updated since 2026 using songs and spoken word in a thematic set of content that satirizes the state of post-2020 technology. "Blending humor, technology, and performance, the piece explores our relationship with machines while turning the audience into an essential part of the show."

== 2001–2015 Trading Cards ==
M.Leavitt, ArtCards @ 2001 Olympia, WA exhibition

With his "ArtCards" from 2001 to 2003 Leavitt painted small portraits of famous and lesser-known artists, re-printed like traditional baseball cards. "I had so many ideas- too many ideas- the opposite of writer's block" says Leavitt, "I started doing trading cards of work I had already done, ideas for things I hadn't built, and famous people... my influences, who inspired me." "ArtCard" subjects were drawn from varied genre, similar to his successive "Art Army" action figures. As described by Leavitt, the trading cards were the direct precursor to the 'action figures': "the trading cards... were like singular figures in action. Why not 3-D? Why not an action figure, a toy?" Printed and sold in limited editions, packaged in wrappers with bubble gum, "Art Cards" were also exhibited as art objects. Leavitt said, "It's a way I created to compare people and what they do across all kinds of different areas." "Many mass-produced trading cards are based on original pieces that are shrunken down to fit the space. 'I take great pride that that is the size I drew them,' Leavitt says. 'It's one of the challenges I like- it's like a game, to create art that small and make it work.'" (The Artist's Magazine)

Seattle-based independent media advocacy group Reclaim the Media collaborated with Leavitt in 2008 to produce a set of "Media Heroes" trading cards. From 2009 to 2015 the Topps Trading Card company hired Leavitt to produce illustrations for their Star Wars sketch cards .

== 2006–2013 Alternative Kitsch Projects ==
Leavitt formatted small-scale figurative work as personalized wedding cake toppers to depict the bride and groom. "(Leavitt's) custom work is just a little bit different than most. He makes action figures, and what is more action packed than a wedding? With a few simple design modifications, Mike turned his action figure style into one of a kind cake toppers." (Handcrafted.com) Once showing famous celebrity couples from modern history and same-sex marriage in gallery exhibitions, "the cake toppers are playful with a message... a look at love in the spotlight." (The Desert Sun)

In a series entitled "Pitchfork Pals" Leavitt collaborated with the Seattle artist and iconoclast Charles Krafft. Leavitt sculpted busts of controversial icons for the project. Charles Krafft was responsible for producing the pottery by hand. Krafft is a ceramicist known for his non-traditional, kitsch-like objects. Included in the series were figures such as Kim Jong Il and Charles Manson depicted as tea pots and the British nostalgia collectibles known as Toby mugs. "They're teapots, which is clever if not representative of each character pouring malevolence into the culture that surrounds them."(Jailbreak Collective)

On using the "Kim Jong Il" tea pot, one humorist conjectured, "when drinking tea from this miserable looking device, you have to avert your eyes and be eternally grateful for such a delicious brew. If you don't, you might 'go missing'." (Mof Gimmers)

== 2002–2024 Action Figures ==
M.Leavitt, Vincent van Gogh, 2005, polymer clay, elastic cord, internal steel armature.

Starting in 2002, Leavitt's "Art Army" series is considered fine art, though these sculptures are also described as action figures. "These are art toys with a capital 'A'." (Jason Atomic, PIMP Magazine) Leavitt is "interested mainly in the figure as sculpture, and less as a pure platform." (Dot Dot Dash, Die Gestalten Verlag) The "toy" definition describes the figures' engineering. Leavitt says, " 'action figures' are OURS, (they are) particular to the early '80's boom in mainstream toy business that predated the anti-social video game boom' and I like the connotations of the words 'action' and 'figure'- movement and motion, and figurative realism." The mixed media and wood figures range from 6 cm to 1 meter tall with moving body parts and accessories.

"More of a good-natured joke than a stern commentary on the commodification of art" (David Stoesz, Seattle Weekly), Leavitt's biographic series depicts subjects in an array of genres though most often contemporary visual artists. Leavitt "perceives the potential for his figures to act as bridges between pop culture and art history." (Dot Dot Dash, Die Gestalten Verlag) In over 400 different figures subjects include Jeff Koons, Ai WeiWei, Kara Walker, Cindy Sherman, Takashi Murakami, Frida Kahlo, David Byrne, Björk and Tupac Shakur. "The tributes to Leavitt's heroes will do nothing more than put a big dopy grin on your face." (Seattle Magazine)

"When it comes to art icons, Michael Leavitt has a deep set of beliefs about who deserves a reserved parking space in the annals of history." (Juxtapoz Magazine) Leavitt has said, "I wanted to pay respect to people's work I love, and give them a little taste of their own medicine" exploring the concept of an artist's body being consumed by their work. The 'enemy' of the "Art Army", "The Man", included Martha Stewart, Britney Spears and the John Tesh, Michael Bolton, Kenny G "3-Headed Monster". "The project is clearly aligned against the forces of imperialism and cultural suckiness, but Leavitt makes his points with a light touch, being too high-spirited and incorrigibly silly to get bogged down in another dreary leftist critique." (David Stoesz, Seattle Weekly) "Leavitt succeeds in art's most important function — to not only help us recognize and articulate our values, but participate in a dialog that validates them as well. At its best, art connects our best selves with each other, and he has done that... I'm grateful to artists who address the subject of 'What is it about fighting and glorifying fighting and power, anyway?' in a way that gets our minds thinking and lips moving." (Polymer Clay Daily)

M.Leavitt, Barack Obama, 2008, mixed media.

Collaborating on various action figure projects, the toy company FCTRY manufactured Leavitt's first mass-produced "Art Army" figure portraying the urban artist Banksy in 2013. Leavitt also created prototypes for Hillary Clinton, Donald Trump dolls and Bernie Sanders action figures for the same toy company in 2015 and 2016. Leavitt and FCTRY have since collaborated with the production of Elizabeth Warren, Supreme Court Justice Ruth Bader Ginsburg, Robert Mueller and other figures. Collaborating on different political projects, FCTRY also worked with the activist and former tennis champion Billie Jean King to formally licensed her action figure in 2019 while also producing a Dr. Fauci figure in 2020.

Leavitt has created more political satire including his sculpture of Barack Obama in a Keanu Reeves/"Matrix" style robe. With a large wood cross and tentacles made of stars and stripes, the 2008 commentary was designed to counter-act negative stereotypes of the candidate during his first Presidential campaign. In 2013 Leavitt sculpted a satirical portrait of Donald Trump. The one-off piece was part of Leavitt's "Empire Peaks" series. It depicted the reality TV star as the Star Wars character Darth Vader.

== 2013-2016 Film Industry Send-ups ==
In 2013 Leavitt created a series of articulated wooden statues, titled "Empire Peaks", lampooning pop culture icons. Leavitt's one-off hand-sculpted wood and clay "mash ups" featured celebrities, politicians, humanitarians and other famous non-fictional personalities crossed with fictional and infamous sci-fi characters. With "Empire Peaks", Leavitt is "juxtaposing the classic archetypal roles found in Yoda, Luke Skywalker, Darth Vader, and the rest of the famed cast with pop-culture personas." (Laughing Squid) "By turning well known figures such as Kim Jong Il, Che Guevara, Charles Darwin, Albert Einstein, Gandhi, Abraham Lincoln, Barack Obama, Michael Jackson and Steve Jobs into consumer products based on the popular franchise, Leavitt hopes to explore such themes as idol worship, our coveting of mass-produced collectibles and our societies need for heroes, rebels, villains and tyrants." (Trendhunter) According to the Houston Chronicle, Leavitt went "viral with his spaced-out rendition of public figures as Star Wars characters" "'Empire Peaks' is a phenomenal, Star Wars meets pop culture, collection of hand-carved action figures." (Church Mag) "Every single work in the exhibit is a stroke of genius." (Zimbio)

"Like many kids who were raised in the late '70s and early '80s, the characters of Star Wars exist in a place in Leavitt's mind that is usually reserved for real-life figures," says Fast Company Magazine, "It is this mental distinction between beloved fictional characters who feel real and real-life people who feel fictional that Leavitt explores in his latest project, Empire Peaks."

Titled "King Cuts", Leavitt created a series of wood sculptures devoted to famous film directors in 2016. "Tim Burton, Alfred Hitchcock and George Lucas have all been treated to one of Mike's makeovers, which involves merging stars from behind the silver screen with their most iconic on-screen characters" (Creative Boom) Leavitt carved the 1/4 scale, 18-inch (46 cm) sculptures in wood and finished the carvings with acrylic paint. "King Cuts" furthered the central themes in Leavitt's art of exposing taste-makers behind the scenes, and work consuming a creator's body. "The lives of many great film directors are undoubtedly consumed by their work, intertwined with the stories, characters and settings they seek to convey." Leavitt said, "I'm good at sculpting the likeness of a face, so it gets interesting when it's a face maybe you wouldn't recognize off the bat, but you know who it is. You know that person's work. It's the face behind the mask, the person behind the camera, the wizard behind the curtain."

== 2006–2024 Recycled Material Sculptures ==
M.Leavitt, Chuck Taylor, 2009

"Mike Leavitt is a singularly talented Seattle artist. He makes all kinds of art, from action figures to reproductions of iconic shoes. Mike has lovingly recreated them down to the exact detail. But there is one significant difference. Although you would never know it to look at the photo, these shoes are made with cardboard. Mike Leavitt is the inventor of the cardboard shoe... a bit of a trickster, and certainly curious."(CBC Radio)

"If only there were a way to retain a pristine version of the shoe, and save the planet from excess shoe box waste. Enter Mike Leavitt and his recycled-cardboard kicks."(Paste Magazine) In Leavitt's ongoing series of cardboard shoes and "Hip Hopjects", to-scale editions of cultural ephemera are made with recycled materials. "Though best known for his cardboard sneakers, the rest of artist Mike Leavitt's work is just as jaw-dropping" (blog.UrbanOutfitters.com). Items such as a "ghetto blaster", baseball hat, and soccer ball have been rendered in actual scale and size with reconstituted cardboard and brown paper bag. "Give him some recycled cardboard, paper bag, along with some glue and acrylic paint, and artist Mike Leavitt could create just about anything" (JoshSpear.com)

The "Corrugated Kix" series of cardboard shoes includes "an abundance of painstakingly detailed classic kick replicas". (Hi Fructose) "Leavitt works his creative magic on a number of classic silhouettes, including the Air Jordan 1, Air Jordan 4, Vans Slip-On, and Converse Chuck Taylor. Michael does an incredible job of recreating the colors and logos of these classics."(NiceKicks.com) The shoes are "to not carry of course, but to admire as an art object." (nu.nl/lifestyle) "By creating cardboard sculptures of some of the most popular models in footwear he is essentially riding the commercial train and exercising his meticulous craft of making these wearable cardboard replicas... the demographic that would buy these may not usually buy a piece of art but they would buy this and call it Art." (Cyanatrendland.com)

Providing an educational aid and source material in 2021, Leavitt started publishing a series of free tutorials to format his cardboard shoes as a do-it-yourself craft project for DIY makers and classrooms.

Leavitt says, "I might dabble in satire of other essentials in a bad economy: eye glasses, winter coats, food items... but shoes are so intimately linked to our visual culture. They're a necessity that we still get to have fun buying and wearing. I've always believed that fine art, high quality craft, and meaningful objects can be affordable. Galleries, museums and artists can find plenty of room for a different, affordable, more commercially sustainable kind of art-for-art's-sake... that fits in both the museum and living room." (Seattlemet.com) Leavitt continues, "it's ironic to use a cheap disposable material like cardboard. Cheap, disposable material makes an expensive product, oddly resembling the manufacturing of boutique footwear. The simple image of the cardboard shoe speaks humorously and clearly on consumerism." (Suite101.com)

M.Leavitt, Air Jordan, 2009

"Trash Talking", Leavitt's 2024 series of works, feature objects and shoes made from alternate recycled material specifically chosen for its sociopolitical symbolism. Hi-Fructose Magazine's Daniel 'Attaboy' Seifert says of the "Trash Talking" work, "The message in the art is evident at first glance. Yet, I have to admit, there's a secret part of me wants to wear a 'real' pair of lego Adidas and wonders what Nike-branded Chinese takeout food would taste like. The consumer in me, raised on a flood of thirty second commercial pitches on sponge sweet Wonder Bread since before i could talk, finds many of these 'Fake Out' products appealing, and that consumer is always here, lurking for a 'limited edition' dopamine hit."

"Colorful and tremendously clever, these (Trash Talking) works draw us in with a wink and a smile... There is a lot of humor here, but look closely and the story gets deeper and darker... An AR-15 made from Disney product boxes marks the Marjory Stoneman Douglas High School shooting in Florida. It's pretty intense. And also an example of how powerful art can be when the medium is expertly matched with the message." (Brangien Davis, Crosscut) "This is one of those rare occasions where the content of the work, the site where it's located and how it's arranged all come together brilliantly." (Gayle Clemans, Seattle Times)

== Critical Response ==
Entertainment Weekly pokes fun at a piece depicting the television and film director Joss Whedon saying, "The sculptor and painter definitely got his hair and beard right, and the real Whedon also has seemingly greenish eyes — though they're perhaps less demonic than these radioactive emeralds. Is he about to Hulk out or something?" (Entertainment Weekly)

Leavitt's Jeremy Lin sculpture created in 2012 is a source of controversy. Larry Hama, creator of the G.I. Joe action figure series says, "I don't think this is offensive or anything, but it's a bit of a stretch for a bad joke that's just this side of a non-sequiter. And who in their right mind would pay that price for something that misses the mark?" (Animalnewyork.com). Another critic adds, "While I love the fact that someone was inspired to make a Jeremy Lin action figure... did it really have to look this dopey? There's really no need to ninja-fy him." (Angryasianman.com)

Other critiques attempt to categorize Leavitt's work. "It is difficult to define what exactly Leavitt does. His extreme boredom for 'normal' art has resulted in a number of nonpareil projects displayed around the world." (Suite101.com) "His versatility as almost a modern day renaissance man" causes Leavitt's subject matter to encompass a wide range. "Like the objects that they celebrate, Leavitt's lightweight replicas sit on the border between culture and commerce." (Wired Magazine) "We've previously seen his ceramic teapots made to resemble notorious murderers and landscapes painted on pennies. Is there a medium that Mike Leavitt won't try?" (Neatorama)

"Leavitt hasn't always worked to solve social problems, though his artwork has always had a social angle. His interest in the individual's relationship with his or her environmental space... has long been the basis for his art."(Real Change) Leavitt says, "The challenge is designing an object that people want, while making it about something they don't want to hear about."

"... there is hope, there are a few braves who can help us try to understand this every day reality, Michael Leavitt is one of those. His ability to create and re-create unique pieces of work has helped modern art to be less chaotic, less elitist, and more affordable for the common people. Leavitt art is extremely fun, action driven, colorful and very dynamic. You feel you are in the game, it's easy to become part of the experience." (Atrocidades.net)

"Michael Leavitt still keeps the habit of running with his dog and playing basketball everyday- even while working of his solo exhibitions in New York. His work based on well known figures in art and politics is a contrast to his simple personal life." (Obscura Magazine) "Leavitt has a raw talent for capturing prominent artists, musicians and entertainers in their elements and characterizing them into brilliant sculptures." (KidRobot)

"Artist Michael Leavitt continues his assault on the wider art world in the nerdiest way possible... there is no secret to the artist's fervor." (The Huffington Post) "The bravest move in art's to rebel against classical training to follow a low-culture muse- as with Marcel Duchamp's urinal... Turning a bold 'screw it' into sweet art for you, Mike Leavitt" (Thrillist.com)

"The hardest working man in the art world, Leavitt alters the everyday objects among us with his blazing technical skill and wit."(CapativeWildWoman.com) "From my interactions with Mike, I know the artist to have 'the opposite of writer's block' and to be constantly producing work and improving his craft. Mike Leavitt will probably create something in the time it takes you to read this." (Jeremy Brautman) Leavitt says, "I'm kind of conceptual art, but I'm not that heady."(Port Townsend Leader) "Leavitt is a unique breed of artist. His work and execution (in both concept and finished product) are too impressive and relevant not to be considered on par with some of the most popular contemporary visual artists working today."(Jailbreak Collective)
