= Happy Ever After =

Happy Ever After may refer to:

== Film and television ==
- Happy Ever After (1932 film), a German musical
- Happy Ever After (1954 film), a British comedy
- Happy Ever Afters, a 2009 Irish comedy film
- Happy Ever After (British TV series), a 1974–1979 sitcom
- Happy Ever After (Hong Kong TV series), a 1999 period drama
- "Happy Ever After" (Thomas & Friends), a 1998 TV episode
- "Happy Ever After?", a 1997 episode of Bugs

== Literature ==
- Happy Ever After, a 2010 Bride Quartet novel by Nora Roberts
- Happy Ever After: Escaping The Myth of The Perfect Life, a 2019 book by Paul Dolan
- "Happily ever after", a variant of the happy ending, a favorable outcome for the protagonist in fiction

== Music ==
=== Albums ===
- Happy Ever After (album), by the Dogs D'Amour, 2000
- Happy Ever After, by Amber Lawrence, 2016
- Happy Ever After, by Gangway, 1992

=== Songs ===
- "Happy Ever After" (Julia Fordham song), 1988
- "Happy Ever After" (Ricki-Lee Coulter song), 2014
- "Happy Ever After", by the Bee Gees from High Civilization, 1991
- "Happy Ever After", by Brotherhood of Man, 1973
- "Happy Ever After (Zero Hour)", by Foo Fighters from Concrete and Gold, 2017
- "Happy Ever After", by Jesper Kyd from the 2018 Indian film Tumbbad

== See also ==
- Happily Ever After (disambiguation)
- Happily Never After (disambiguation), including "Happy Never After"
- Ever After (disambiguation)
