= Megan and Liz =

American music duo

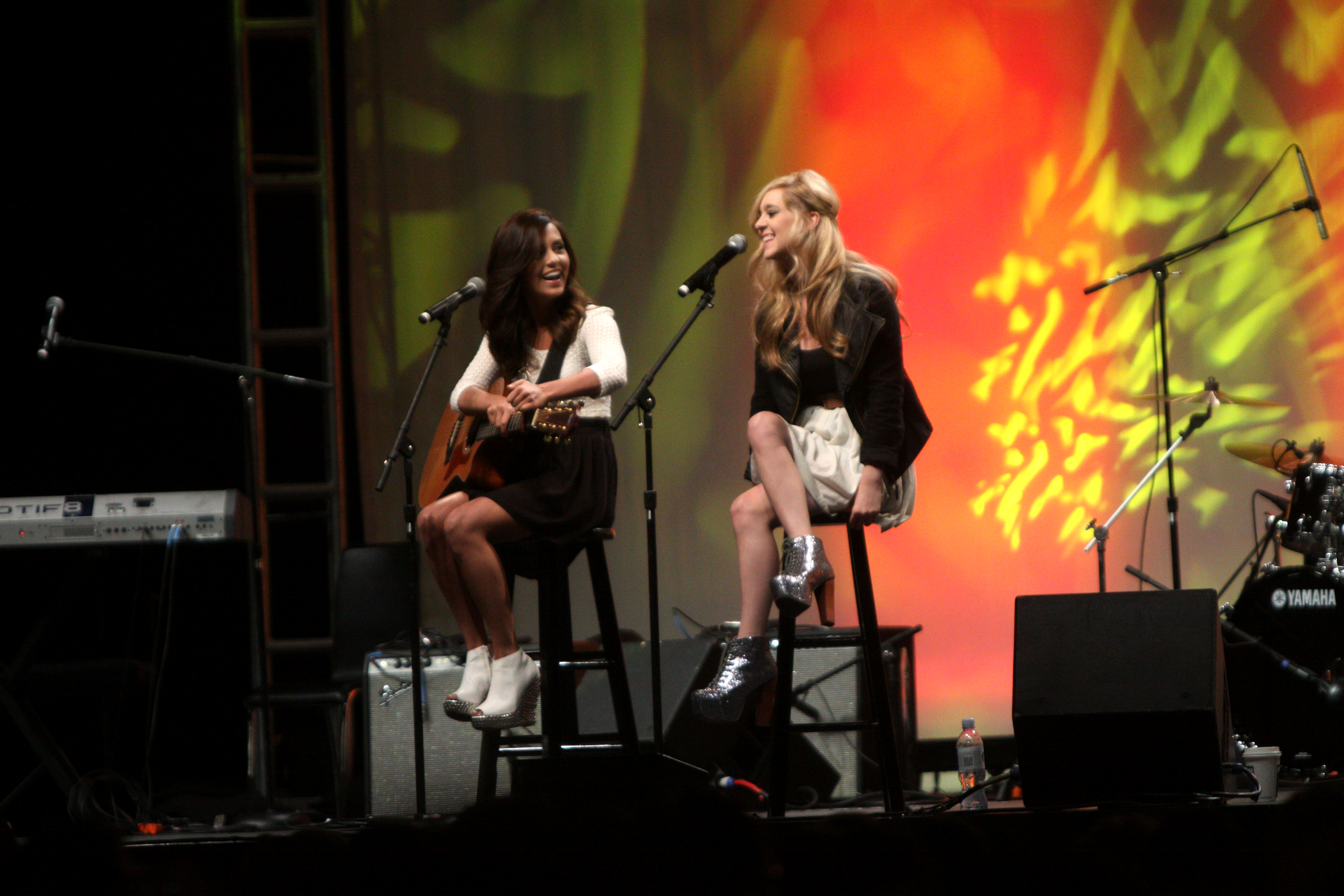
- Megan and Liz performing at VidCon 2012 at the Anaheim Convention Center in Anaheim, California

Background information
- Born: November 21, 1992 (age 33)
- Origin: Edwardsburg, Michigan, United States
- Genres: Pop; country
- Years active: 2007–present
- Label: Collective Sounds (2011-2014) Hidden Cow Inc (2014-)
- Members: Megan McKinley Mace; Elizabeth Morgan Mace
- Website: meganandliz.com

Megan and Liz (commonly stylized as Megan & Liz) are an American pop duo composed of fraternal twin sisters Megan and Liz Mace from Edwardsburg, Michigan. They are both songwriters, and Megan is their guitarist. As of November 2020, they have 990K subscribers and over 249 million video views on their YouTube channel.

== Early life ==
Megan McKinley Mace and Elizabeth Morgan Mace were born on November 21, 1992, in South Bend, Indiana, to Randall Mace and Mary Miars. They grew up in Edwardsburg, Michigan. Megan is the elder sister by one minute. Their parents divorced when the twins were three and they lived with their mother.

== Music career ==
=== 2007–2011: YouTube beginnings ===
Their first video on YouTube, entitled "This Note", is a song which they wrote at the age of 15. Their first cover was of "Ain't No Mountain High Enough", originally written by Nickolas Ashford & Valerie Simpson and performed by Marvin Gaye and Tammi Terrell, but better known from Diana Ross's cover in 1970. They have posted 28 original songs on YouTube (as of June 2012). While living in Michigan, the girls posted a new cover or original song every week or two.

In February 2011, Megan and Liz went on tour with Boyce Avenue and Tiffany Alvord. They performed nine shows across the United States.

The duo released their first official music video on May 20, 2011, of their self-written song "Happy Never After". Since then they have posted 28 original and 13 official videos. Two days later, on May 22, 2011, Megan and Liz performed at the Totally Tube concert in Westbury, New York, alongside fellow YouTubers Kurt Schneider, Tiffany Alvord, Joseph Vincent, Kait Weston, and Jenna Rose.

Since moving to Nashville, Tennessee, the duo has been added to Nashville Hootenanny's 'Teen Hoot' roster, where local artists perform for a crowd of teens at Westwood Studios. Megan and Liz have appeared on June 26, 2011, and August 20, 2011, performances and play both covers and original songs for further shows. In the August 20 show, they performed a duet with "Need Your Poison" co-writers Memphis High.

Their second music video, "Rest of You", was released on June 17, 2011. The video was shot in their hometown of Edwardsburg, Michigan with several of their friends. Views of Lake Michigan can be seen in the video. The single was released two days prior to the music video's release on YouTube and Celebuzz.

In the beginning of August 2011, Megan & Liz debuted their new single, "Here I Go", on Celebuzz!. The song was co-written by the girls and Paula Winger. In late August 2011, the twins released their next original song, "Run Away", along with a corresponding music video. The girls co-wrote the song with Alexz Johnson and Jimmy Robbins. The video was shot at Edwin Warner Park in Nashville.

In late August, Megan & Liz announced that they will be opening for Action Item on their upcoming "The Stronger The Love" tour, along with Burnham, Hollywood Ending, and The After Party. They appeared in all eight shows.

"World's Gunna End", another Megan & Liz original, was released on September 6, 2011. The accompanying music video was released on September 12. Megan and Liz co-wrote the song back in May 2011 with songwriter and music producer Chris Sernel. The girls, along with their video producer (who had appeared in the "Here I Go" music video), visited over thirty locations in Nashville to shoot the many alternating scenes in the video.

=== 2011–2012: A Twinning Christmas, "Are You Happy Now?" and performances ===
In early September 2011, Megan revealed on her official Twitter account that they would be releasing a Christmas EP before the release of their debut album. Their first original Christmas song, "It's Christmas Time", was released on November 8, 2011.

In mid-September 2011, Megan & Liz announced that they were heading to Los Angeles, California to shoot multiple music videos. One of them was for an original song, "Are You Happy Now?" (co-written with Paula Winger), which was directed by Shenae Grimes of 90210. This song was also recorded for the Do Something organization against bullying. The single was released on October 8, 2011. The music video premiered on Teen.com on October 17, 2011. The website had been promoting Megan & Liz the week prior, including releasing exclusive behind-the-scenes footage of the video shoot with Grimes, premiering a video teaser, and hosting a giveaway of some of the props used in the video. As of now, an acoustic version of the song taken from one of their live performances is available as a free download on their Facebook fan page.

Their original song, "Old School Love", was released early on December 21, 2011, with the re-release slated for January 3, 2012. The filming of the video was completed on October 1, 2011. It was written by Megan and Liz, along with Alexz Johnson and Jimmy Robbins. The video was released on January 16, 2012.

On December 2, 2011, the girls performed at the annual 107.5 The River's Acoustic Christmas 2011 concert in Nashville, alongside Demi Lovato, Hot Chelle Rae, Colbie Caillat, Andy Grammer, and Cobra Starship. On December 9, the girls were invited to perform at the Z100 Jingle Ball 2011 Pre-Show in New York City.

=== 2012–2013: This Time, Bad for Me and Macy's partnership ===
In January 2012, the girls traveled to L.A. to film a music video for another original song, "A Girl's Life". The video was released a short while later on January 30, 2012. Also in January, the girls joined Allstar Weekend along with Hollywood Ending, Before You Exit, and The After Party on select dates during the winter portion of their 2011-2012 tour. They performed in 3 shows.

Megan & Liz's fourth EP, This Time, was released on February 28, 2012. It was sold in physical form for a limited time in F.y.e. stores nationwide. This EP contains seven original songs, six of which had previously been released as singles. The other original song is called "Princess Charming". The EP was also released on iTunes on February 20.

Their original song, "Long Distance" was first released in early April 2012 to fans who had received ten clicks on their contest "share" links through a Facebook app. The music video was filmed in Los Angeles in the middle of March 2012 and was released on May 4, 2012.

In May 2012, they performed on the Village stage at the annual Wango Tango concert event.

Their single, titled "Bad for Me" (which as of August 31 is in the top 100 iTunes songs at number 70), was released on July 31, 2012. The song was co-written and produced by Martin Johnson, a producer and front-runner of the band, Boys Like Girls. The song had its world premiere on RyanSeacrest.com the day before it was officially released. The official music video was released on August 13, 2012. In fall of 2012, Megan and Liz went on a radio tour to promote their new single, "Bad For Me".

As a result of their partnership with Macy's, the girls filmed a nationwide commercial for the retail chain in June 2012. The commercial features snippets from their video for their song, "Bad for Me." They were chosen to participate in the Macy's iHeart Radio Rising Star contest. With the help of their fans, they won the contest and were named the Macy's iHeart Radio Rising Stars. Liz stated "When we won the Macy's iHeartRadio Contest, I swear we did some major twin magic to make that happen. It was legit twin powers I swear". On September 21, 2012, they performed at the Clear Channel's iHeart Radio Music Festival at the MGM Grand in Las Vegas.

Megan & Liz were also featured in a commercial for the 2012 MTV Video Music Awards. In the promo, the girls announced the nominees for "Best Female Video", while performing an acoustic snippet of each song when they showed up on the screen. Later on in that month, the girls were listed as number 14 on Billboard's 21 Under 21, a list of current and up-and-coming music artists. They were also featured in The New York Times. They have also appeared in the October 2012 issue of Seventeen and the November 2012 issue of Teen Vogue.

On November 9, 2012, Megan & Liz announced that they would be releasing an EP on November 18, 2012, titled Bad for Me, named after their first mainstream single. The EP features "Bad for Me" as well as six new original songs, including "Like I Would", a country song that was solely written by Megan and Liz Mace. The EP peaked at number 7 on the iTunes Pop Albums chart and number 20 on the iTunes Top 200. It proceeded to claim number 11 on the Billboard Heatseekers chart, as well as number 49 on the Billboard Independent Albums chart.

They were red carpet correspondents at the 2012 American Music Awards. On November 22, 2012, the girls performed at the annual Macy's Thanksgiving Day Parade in New York City, NY.

=== 2013–2016: Look What You Started, first headlining tour, and extended plays ===
On February 6, 2013, Megan & Liz announced a new song, "All Alright". A snippet of the song was featured in their February update video. They have also recorded a track titled "Telescope" with Zach Porter of Allstar Weekend back in 2011, but as of October 2013, it has been removed from the confirmed track listing of their debut album.

In April, Megan & Liz announced that they were partnering with Macy's and American Rag to embark on a cross-country road trip as part of the American Icons program. In the spring of 2013, the twins traveled across the country to visit some of America's famous music cities – Nashville, Detroit, Miami, New Orleans, Austin, Los Angeles, Seattle and NYC. They performed at different venues around the country and filmed a web series chronicling their experiences. While on this trip, the girls wrote a song called "The Right Now".

In May, Megan & Liz attended the Radio Disney Music Awards where they got to introduce a performer. Their song "Bad For Me" was also featured in an Audi commercial. In June 2013, the twins performed at Popfest in Princeton, New Jersey with Carly Rae Jepsen, Cher Lloyd, Jason Derulo, and Hot Chelle Rae.

In April, Megan & Liz announced that their new single, "Release You", would premiere on June 1, 2013, on Saturday Night Online. The song was released on iTunes on June 4. The twins asked fans to submit contributions to the official lyric video. On June 14, Megan & Liz announced their first headlining tour entitled "American Rag On Tour Presents: Megan & Liz". The tour stopped in 26 cities across the US and Canada. The opening act was Kalin and Myles. Their original songs, "All Alright", "In the Shadows Tonight", "Back Home", and "Grave" were first performed during this tour.

A new track from their upcoming album, In the Shadows Tonight, written by Megan and Liz Mace, was released on August 19, accompanied by a music video.

Their debut album, Look What You Started, was initially planned to be released in February 2014. The standard edition will feature sixteen tracks, fifteen of which are brand new (with the exception of "Bad for Me", which was previously released on an EP). Seven songs have been confirmed so far: "Bad for Me", "Release You", "Switch Hearts", "All Alright", "Look What You Started", "Karma's Coming Back for Me", and "Grave". They have collaborated with Liz Huett, Taylor Swift's former back-up singer and Nashville-based songwriter. They have also had writing sessions with producers Toby Gad and Nathan Chapman, as well as with songwriter Jason Reeves. Megan described the album to be along the lines of country and pop. A song on the album is rumored to be called "Shut Up and Kiss Me". Some of the writing and recording of the song was documented in an online interview video. They are also working on two tracks with producer John Fields. They have also written an additional two songs with Martin Johnson, including the title track to their album. In late April 2014, the girls announced the closing of their record label, Collective Sounds, back in January 2014. Because of this, their debut album originally slated for February will not be released due to legal bindings. They also announced the release of their upcoming EP, titled Simple Life – their first reflecting their new country direction. That same day, Billboard premiered their new single, "Simple Life". On June 3, the duo released their EP, Simple Life. On June 12, Megan posted a solo original titled "But I Do" on her Tumblr. The link led to the duo's SoundCloud page which contained 5 unreleased songs, including a demo version of the title track of their unreleased album Look What You Started. This song was heard live for the first time at the release party for their EP Simple Life on June 3, 2014.

They hosted This Week in the Nation, a bi-weekly web show through My Country Nation, from 2014 to 2015.

In 2016, they released an EP called Deux.

== Personal lives ==
Both of the girls attended Edwardsburg High School in Michigan, where they were both cheerleaders. After their relocation to Tennessee, they returned to Michigan to graduate with their class in June 2011.

They teamed up with Friskies to raise $1,000 for the Friends for Dearborn Animal Shelter during the 2010 holiday season. The donation was awarded when their holiday jingle video surpassed 100,000 views after 18 days.

The duo also have a beauty channel on YouTube where they post videos that focus on hair, makeup, and style, as well as aspects of inner beauty.

In June 2012, Megan & Liz joined the Band Against Bullying campaign. They performed at a corresponding benefit concert in New York City on July 20, 2012, alongside Hot Chelle Rae.

In December 2017, Liz became engaged to Weston Amick after one year of dating. They were married on September 29, 2018. They have one child, a son, born on July 1, 2025.

On October 5, 2019, Megan became engaged to her boyfriend of five years, Witt McKay. They were married on May 21, 2021. They have one child, a daughter, born on August 15, 2023. In February 2025, the couple announced that they were expecting their second child, a boy.

== Awards and nominations ==
Year	Award	Category	Recipient	Result	Reference(s)
2014	Teen Choice Awards	Choice Web Star: Music	Megan and Liz	Nominated	
2015	Teen Choice Awards	Choice Country Song	"That Ghost"	Nominated	
