= Donald Trump dolls =

Stevenson Entertainment Group product

Donald Trump doll
- Type: Doll
- Company: Stevenson Entertainment Group
- Country: United States
- Availability: September 2004–
- Materials: Plastic
- Features: Digital sound chip

Several dolls based on Donald Trump have been created since 2004, beginning with the release of a 12-inch (30 cm) Trump doll by Stevenson Entertainment Group, which signed a licensing deal with The Trump Organization. The doll includes 17 phrases recorded by Trump.

During and after Trump's 2016 presidential campaign, various artists created their own Trump dolls, which included voodoo dolls and failed plans to produce Trump Troll dolls. FCTRY, a Brooklyn-based toy company, also launched their own Trump doll in 2016.

== 2004 doll ==
=== History ===
In February 2004, officials for Stevenson Entertainment Group LLC – a toy company based in Schaumburg, Illinois – attended an industry trade show in New York, where plans for a miniature Donald Trump figure were conceived. Victor Btesh, the president of Hot Records was introduced to Hugo Stevenson by Marty Krofft of Sid & Marty Krofft Pictures. Btesh had reached out to Marty after reading that Michael Jackson was buying and collecting puppets from Krofft Brothers Saturday morning shows. Btesh wanted to rep Krofft for licensing opportunities, and Krofft asked Btesh to introduce Stevenson to friends in the toy industry. Btesh auditioned to be a contestant on the second season of Trump's reality television series, The Apprentice. Although Btesh did not qualify as a contestant, at the audition he met Donald Trump (while both were waiting to be interviewed by Billy Bush) and pitched the concept of a miniature Trump action figure to Donald Trump, who "loved the idea". Thanks to Btesh the deal was made between Stevenson Entertainment Group and The Trump Organization, with Trump receiving an undisclosed amount of royalties from Stevenson Entertainment Group as part of a licensing agreement.

During a business trip in Los Angeles in April 2004, Trump visited a studio hired by Stevenson so his entire head could be scanned, to aid the doll's sculptors. The doll was announced on May 1, 2004. Stevenson Entertainment Group planned to ship at least 100,000 dolls to U.S. toy chains and distributors in August 2004, with an expected nationwide release the following month. The dolls were meant to capitalize on the success of The Apprentice. Trump considered the concept to be a "fun idea" as long as the doll would look and sound like him, while his spokesperson said, "Mr. Trump thinks that imitation is the highest form of flattery."

The Trump doll was released on September 23, 2004, at a price of $26.99. Btesh's Hot Records sold one million dollar's in dolls to Staples, who were featured on season 2 of The Apprentice. Prior to its nationwide release, the doll was on Amazon.com's list of top-selling new action figures. On September 29, 2004, Trump appeared at a marketing event held at a Toys "R" Us store in New York City's Times Square to promote the doll. The dolls were manufactured in China.

During the 2016 U.S. presidential election, Republican candidate Ted Cruz used the Trump doll in one of his ads against Donald Trump, who was also a candidate in the election. According to BBC, many supporters of Trump's candidacy brought Trump dolls to his rallies. Saturday Night Live's Weekend Update did a story on The Trump Doll, the story was read by Seth Meyers.

=== Description ===
The Trump doll, made of plastic, is dressed in a navy blue suit and pants, both made of cotton. The doll stands 12 inches (30 cm) tall, and includes non-movable hair. A digital sound chip is located in the doll's chest. The doll includes 17 phrases, which Trump recorded. The phrases, activated by pressing a button, consist of quotes used by Trump on The Apprentice and in his 2004 book, Trump: How to Get Rich. Phrases include:

- "This one's easy for me—you're fired."
- "I have no choice but to tell you you're fired."
- "I should fire myself just for having you around."
- "You really screwed up!"
- "You really think you're a good leader? I don't."
- "Stay focused."
- "That was a tough one."
- "Think big and live large."
- "Have an ego. There's nothing wrong with ego."
- "Brand yourself and toot your own horn."

=== Reception ===
Trump called the doll's hair "fantastic!" but said he was "not a fan of the suit." The New York Daily News noted that the doll included "a very un-Trump-like suit made of less than the finest wool." St. Paul Pioneer Press wrote, "Looking much younger and trimmer than Trump, the extremely flexible plastic 'likeness' of the rich businessman and TV personality resembles George W. Bush more than the face of 'The Apprentice.'" In December 2004, Stevenson Entertainment Group stated that the dolls were selling well.

== Other dolls ==
In December 2004, a one-of-a-kind Donald Trump Cabbage Patch Kid was created and autographed by Trump before being auctioned on eBay, with the revenue going to St. Jude Children's Research Hospital. In September 2016, Brooklyn-based toy company FCTRY launched pre-sales for a Trump doll which depicted him with a raised middle finger. In November 2016, anonymous Syrian artist Saint Hoax created images depicting the fictional Trumpette fashion doll, "inspired by all the sexist things Donald Trump has said." Trump is depicted as a female doll in the images, which include comments he has made about women.

Sally Noedel, an artist in Bainbridge Island, Washington, began making and selling 7-inch (18 cm) Trump voodoo dolls in December 2015. Noedel stated that the dolls are sold as a joke and not meant to be taken seriously. According to Noedel, sales increased after Trump was elected as U.S. president in November 2016. In February 2017, a Wisconsin sculptor, Chuck Williams, created a Trump Troll doll and solicited $38,000 through Kickstarter to mass-manufacture the doll. Within a week, Williams had earned over $160,000 from more than 3,600 people. Plans to manufacture the dolls were ended in March 2017, after NBCUniversal, the copyright holders of the Troll dolls, pursued legal action. In November 2017, Filipino artist Elmer Padilla created a Trump doll out of flip-flops.

== See also ==
- Trump: The Game
- Donald Trump baby balloon
