= Liz Huett =

American musician

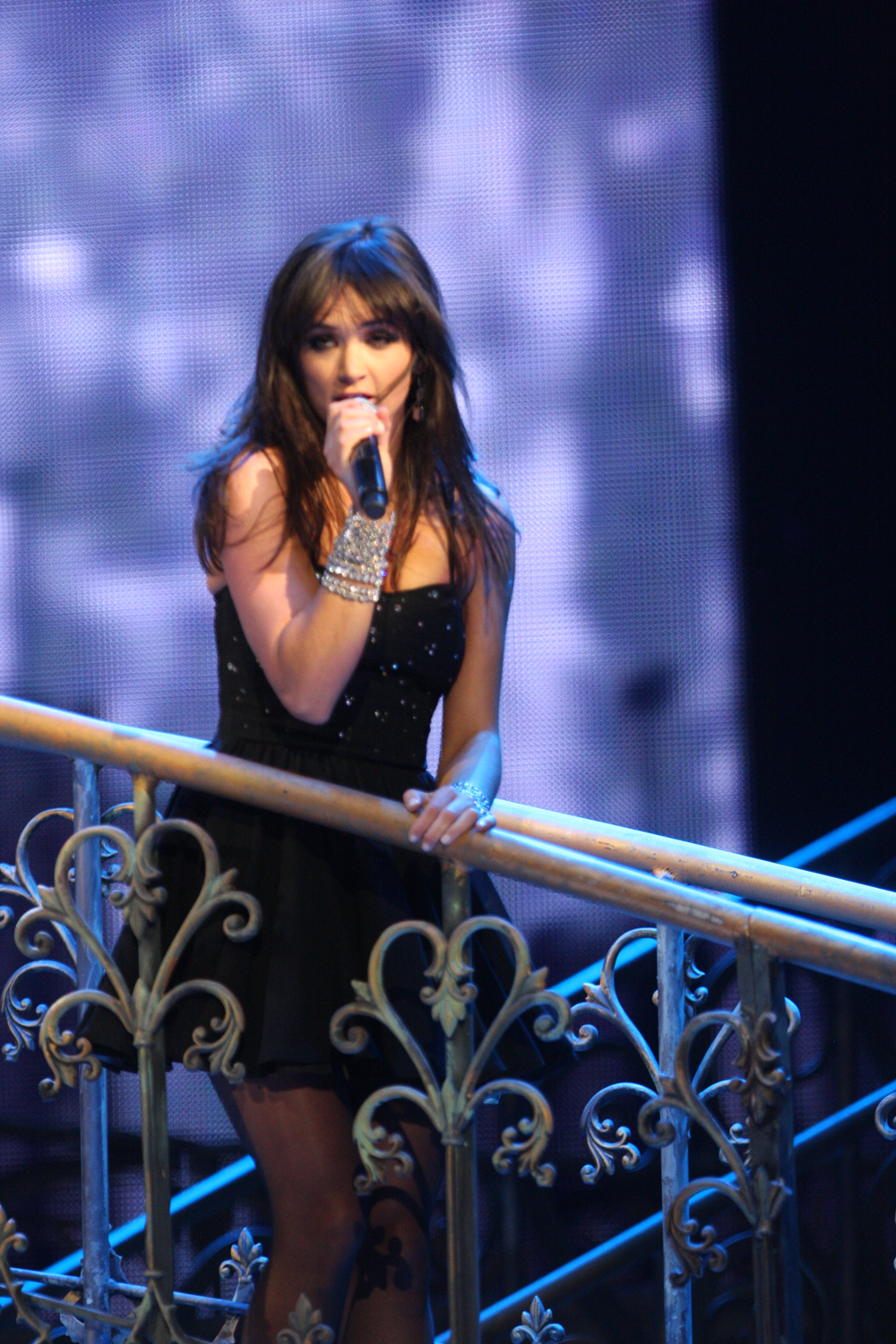

Background information
- Born: Elizabeth Huett; May 27, 1987 (age 39); Riverside, California, U.S.
- Genres: Pop
- Occupation: Singer
- Years active: 1998–present
- Label: Interscope
- Formerly of: The Agency

Elizabeth Huett (born May 27, 1987) is a musician and actress, most known for being Taylor Swift's former background singer.

== Early life ==
Huett grew up in Riverside, California, where she developed a passion for acting. Huett participated in theatre at her school. She acted in commercials for various companies, and on the Nickelodeon show, The Brothers Garcia. In high school, she decided against continuing an acting career, and became interested in music. A year after graduating, Huett moved to Nashville, Tennessee to pursue her music career.

== Music career ==
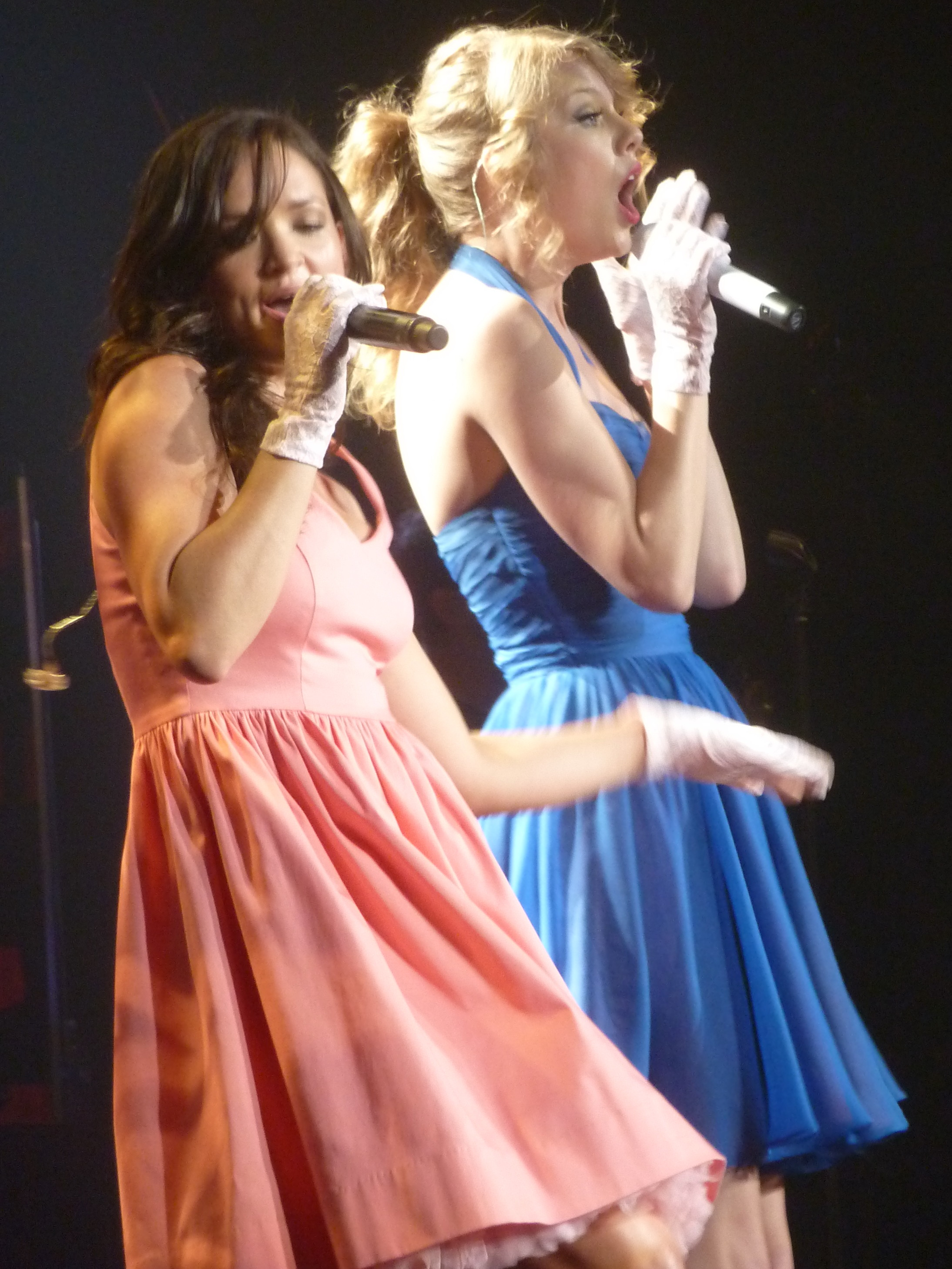
Huett and Swift performing together in Paris in 2011.

=== Vocals for Taylor Swift ===
Huett originally met Swift in a meet and greet line as a fan. In 2006, at the Brandin’ Iron in San Bernardino, Swift advised Huett to move to Nashville to build her music career. Huett toured with Swift for three and a half years during Swift's Speak Now and Fearless years. Huett joined Swift and her band on stage in 2009 when she won Entertainer of the Year at the CMA Awards.

=== Solo career ===
In 2015, Huett signed to Interscope Records, and recorded a solo EP, but abandoned the project after feeling her music was not quite right or ready to be released. In 2017, Huett released her first single, "STFU & Hold Me", which Billboard wrote, "combined a love for radio-friendly pop with country vibes from her time cutting her teeth in Nashville." In 2019, she released the track, "That's What You Get", and Earmilk wrote, " Huett has a soft, warm feeling to her voice, so that even when she’s at her most vulnerable, it feels so comforting."

== Discography ==
=== As primary artist ===
Singles
Title	Year	Reference
Permission	2023	
If You Only Knew	2022	
Miss It Now (For Sarah)	2021	
Always You	2021	
There Goes My Heart	2021	
Far Away from Here	2020	
That's What You Get	2019	
Nothing Personal	2019	
Put Me Back Together	2019	
Responsible	2018	
Don't LV U Anymore	2018	
You Don't Know How It Feels	2018	
H8U	2017	
STFU & Hold Me - Acoustic	2017	
STFU & Hold Me	2017	

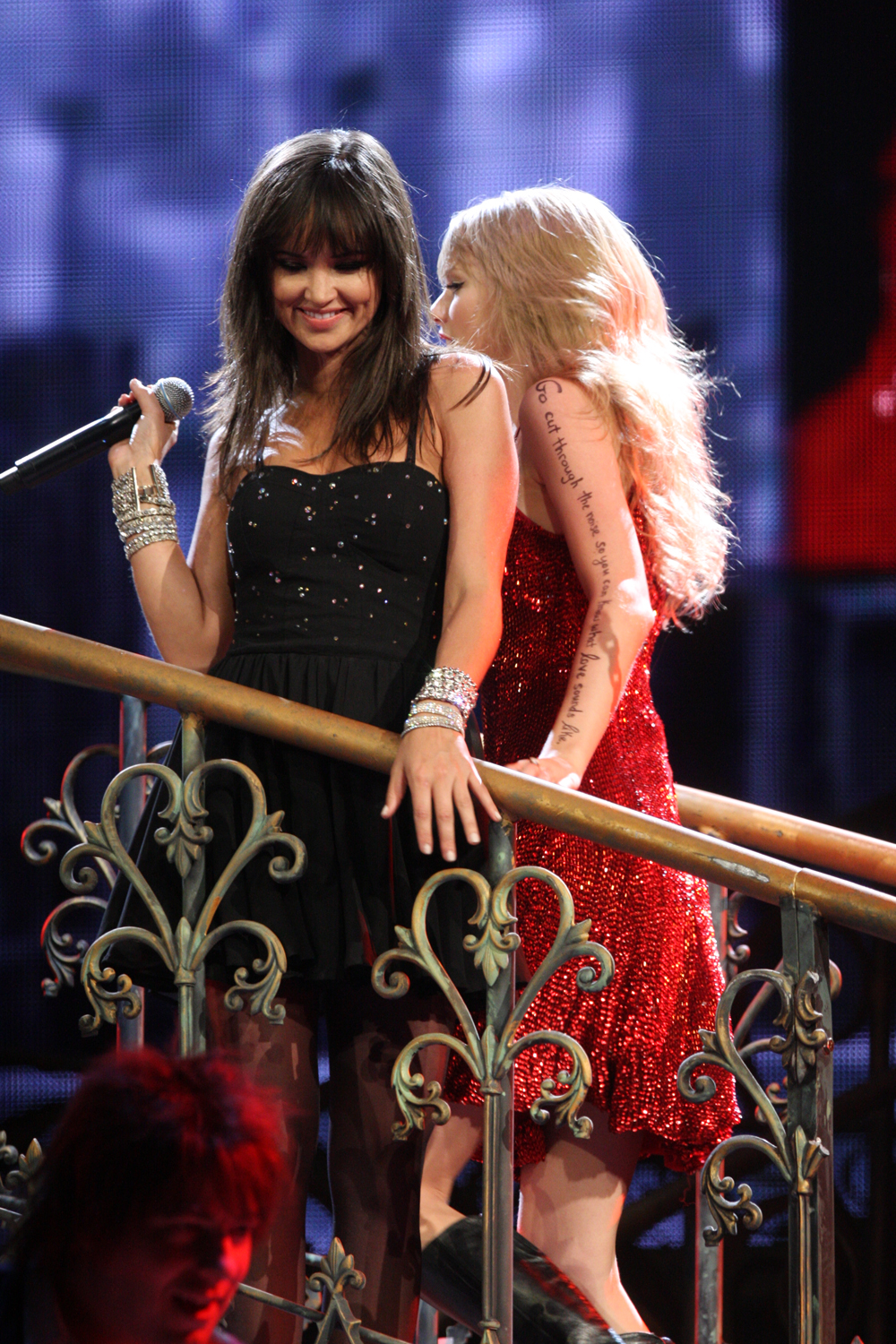
Huett and Swift performing together in Australia in 2012.

=== As supporting artist ===
Albums
Title	Artist	Year	Reference
Speak Now (Taylor's Version)	Taylor Swift	2023	
Red (Taylor's Version)	Taylor Swift	2021	
Slow Me Down	Sara Evans	2014	
Simple Life	Megan and Liz	2014	
Red	Taylor Swift	2012	
Speak Now World Tour – Live	Taylor Swift	2011	
Speak Now	Taylor Swift	2010	

== Filmography ==
Title	Date	Reference
Soldier	1998	
Last Chance	1999	
Social Misfits	2001	
Black Scorpion	2001	
The Brothers Garcia	2002	
Dance War: Bruno vs. Carrie Ann	2008	
