= Bleed (Hot Chelle Rae song) =

Single by Hot Chelle Rae

from the album Lovesick Electric
- B-side: "Heart Hurts"
- Released: April 6, 2010
- Recorded: 2010
- Length: 3:53
- Label: Jive
- Songwriters: Keith Follesé; Adrienne Follesé; Ryan Follesé; Nick Trevisick
- Producers: Max Monet; Eric Valentine

Hot Chelle Rae singles chronology
"I Like to Dance" (2009)	"Bleed" (2010)	"Tonight Tonight" (2011)

"Bleed" is a song by American rock band Hot Chelle Rae. It was released as the second single from their first studio album Lovesick Electric on April 6, 2010. The song peaked at number 31 on the US Mainstream Top 40.

== Background and composition ==
"Bleed" was written by Keith Follesé, Adrienne Follesé, Ryan Follesé and Nick Trevisick while production was handled by Max Monet and Eric Valentine. The song has been described as a "ballad" track. Speaking about the inspiration behind the song, lead vocalist Ryan Follesé stated;

"The inspiration of that song, as most ballads go, definitely a lady and a relationship that I was in, it was just, you know, something that we thought everybody, people could relate to. It's, you know, people have tough time conveying their emotions. There's no better way of writing it down sometimes. That's exactly what the songs was to us."

== Music video ==
A music video to accompany the release of "Bleed" was first released onto YouTube on April 2, 2010. The band asked fans to write short thoughts on pieces of paper while being filmed to have the chance to be part of the video.

== Track listing ==
CD single
No.	Title	Length
1.	"Bleed" (radio edit)	3:43
2.	"Bleed" (album version)	3:53

Digital download
No.	Title	Length
1.	"Bleed"	3:53
2.	"Heart Hurts"	3:24

== Charts ==
Chart performance for "Bleed"
Chart (2010)	Peak position
US Pop Airplay (Billboard)	31

== Release history ==
Release history for "Bleed"
Region	Date	Format	Label	Ref.
United States	April 6, 2010	Contemporary hit radio	Jive	
Various	August 3, 2010	Digital download	Jive	
