= FMS (song) =

Single by New Boyz

from the album Foolie Tape
- Released: April 13, 2012
- Genre: Hip hop
- Length: 3:01
- Label: Warner Bros.
- Songwriter: Dominic Thomas • Earl Benjamin
- Producer: Legacy

New Boyz singles chronology
"I Like It Like That" (2011)	"FMS" (2012)	"I'm on a Roll" (2012)

"FMS" (stylized as "FM$", Freak My Shit) is the sixth and final single by American hip hop duo New Boyz. It was released on April 13, 2012, and included on the mixtape, Foolie Tape (2012). It was produced by Legacy.

== Music video ==
A music video for "FMS" was released on May 7, 2012.

== Charts ==
Chart (2012)	Peak position
US Bubbling Under Hot 100 (Billboard)	8
US Hot R&B/Hip-Hop Songs (Billboard)	33
