= Happily Ever After =

Happily Ever After may refer to:

== Film and television ==
=== Film ===
- Happily Ever After (1985 film), a Brazilian romantic drama film directed by Bruno Barreto
- Happily Ever After (1989 film), an animated movie continuing the adventures of Snow White and her prince
- Happily Ever After (2004 film) (Ils se marièrent et eurent beaucoup d'enfants), a French film
- Happily Ever After, a 2005 Filipino film featuring Yasmien Kurdi
- Happily Ever After (2007 film) (Jigyaku no Uta), a Japanese film by Yukihiko Tsutsumi
- Happily Ever After (2009 film), a Hong Kong film by Azrael Chung and Ivy Kong
- Happy Ever Afters, a 2009 Irish film by Stephen Burke
- Happily Ever After, a 2016 film starring Janet Montgomery and Sara Paxton

=== Television ===
- Happily Ever After (1961 TV series), a British sitcom
- Happily Ever After (2007 TV series), a Singaporean Chinese drama
- Happily Ever After? (Brazilian TV series) or Felizes para Sempre?, a 2015 miniseries
- Happily Ever After: Fairy Tales for Every Child, a 1995-2000 animated series on HBO
- Happily Ever After?, a spin-off of the American reality series The Bachelor
- Happily Ever After (2020 TV series), an Indian web series
- Happily Ever After? (2024 TV series), a Hong Kong television series

==== Episodes ====
- "Happily Ever After" (Charmed)
- "Happily Ever After" (How I Met Your Mother)
- "Happily Ever After" (Law & Order)
- "Happily Ever After" (Lost)
- "Happily Ever After" (Shameless)

== Literature ==
- "Happily ever after", a stock phrase used in fairy tales to signify a happy ending
- Happily Ever After, a 1997 children's book by Anna Quindlen
- Happily Ever After, a 1993 play by Elliott Hayes
- "Happily Ever After", a short story by Aldous Huxley, included in his 1920 collection Limbo

== Music ==
=== Albums ===
- Happily Ever After (Rose Chronicles album), 1996
- Happily Ever After, by the Cure, 1981
- Happily Ever After (G.E.M. album), 2019
- Happily Ever After, by Mount Sims, 2009
- Happily Ever After (EP), by NU'EST, 2019
- Happily Ever After, an EP by Andrew Sandoval (recording as "Andrew")

=== Songs ===
- "Happily Ever After" (song), by Case
- "Happily Ever After", by David Choi
- "Happily Ever After", by He Is We from My Forever
- "Happily Ever After", by Donna Summer from Once Upon a Time
- "Happily Ever After", by Red Velvet from Rookie, 2017
- "Happily Ever After", by Tomorrow X Together from The Name Chapter: Freefall, 2023
- "Happily Ever After", written by Stephen Sondheim for the musical Company and later used in the musical revue Marry Me a Little
- "Happily Ever After", written by Mary Rodgers and Marshall Barer for the musical Once Upon a Mattress
- "Happily Ever After", from Steven Universe: The Movie
- "Happily Ever After (Now and Then)", by Jimmy Buffett from Banana Wind

== Other uses ==
- Happily Ever After (Magic Kingdom), a nightly pyrotechnic show at the Magic Kingdom at the Walt Disney World Resort

== See also ==
- "Happily Ever Aftermath", an episode of Grimm
- Unhappily Ever After, a 1995–1999 American sitcom
- Happily Never After (disambiguation)
- Happy Ever After (disambiguation)
- Ever After (disambiguation)
