= Lovesick Electric =

Studio album by Hot Chelle Rae
- Released: October 23, 2009
- Genre: Pop rock; pop punk; dance-rock; alternative rock
- Length: 39:17
- Label: Jive
- Producer: Eric Valentine; Butch Walker; Matt Radosevich

Hot Chelle Rae chronology
Lovesick Electric (2009)	Whatever (2011)

Singles from Lovesick Electric
- 1. "I Like to Dance" Released: July 30, 2009; 2. "Bleed" Released: August 3, 2010

Lovesick Electric is the debut studio album by American rock band Hot Chelle Rae. It was released by Jive Records on the October 23, 2009. Two singles were released from the album: "I Like to Dance" and "Bleed". The physical copy included a small sticker that said "IL2D".

== Background and release ==
Lovesick Electric was released on October 23, 2009 via Jive Records. The album was produced by Eric Valentine, Butch Walker and Matt Radosevich. According to guitarist Nash Overstreet, the group wrote a total of 60 to 70 songs for the album. Speaking about the main theme of the album, lead vocalist Ryan Follese stated;

"As far as the themes go, I don't even know if it's called a theme but the title of the record, we knew it's gonna be the name of our first album long before we had a record deal. We kind of shaped our sound and our songs around the idea of 'Lovesick Electric', so it kind of came this, um, you know, consistent reminder of what we wanted to be."

Overstreet described the album as a "feel good record" with a lot of dance beat songs. The group went on tour with The Rocket Summer in the spring of 2010 to promote the album. The band also went on a fall tour with Parachute in 2010.

"I Like to Dance" was released as the lead single from the album on July 30, 2009. A music video for the song was released in 2009 featuring an appearance from Stephanie Pratt. The song peaked at number 19 on the ARIA Hitseekers Chart. "Bleed" was released on August 3, 2010 as the second single from the album. The song peaked at number 31 on the US Pop Airplay chart.

== Critical reception ==
Professional ratings
Review scores
Source	Rating
AllMusic	3/5 stars

Lovesick Electric was met with mixed to positive reviews. Matt Collar of AllMusic described the album as a "radio-friendly emo and post-punk-influenced dance-rock" record. He also stated, "These are engaging, melodic, danceable, and passionate songs that bring to mind the yearning emo-pop of Metro Station along with the '80s-influenced dance-rock sound of The Killers."

== Track listing ==
No.	Title	Length
1.	"Say (Half Past Nine)"	3:40
2.	"I Like to Dance"	3:00
3.	"Never Have I Ever"	3:15
4.	"Bleed"	3:53
5.	"Bushes"	3:21
6.	"Problematique"	3:08
7.	"The Distance"	3:48
8.	"Alright"	2:55
9.	"Queen of the Scene"	2:51
10.	"Nothing Left to Hide"	3:39
11.	"Last One Standing"	5:47
Total length:		39:17

== Personnel ==
Credits for Lovesick Electric adapted from AllMusic.

Hot Chelle Rae

- Ryan Follese – lead vocals, rhythm guitar
- Nash Overstreet – lead guitar, backing vocals, percussion
- Ian Keaggy – bass, backing vocals
- Jamie Follese – drums, percussion

Additional musicians

- Chord Overstreet – vocals
- Anton Patzner – strings
- Lewis Patzner – strings
- Matt Radosevich – backing vocals, percussion
- Eric Valentine – percussion
- Butch Walker – backing vocals, percussion

Production

- Jeremy Cowart – photography
- Mark Endert – mixing
- Matt Erickson – composer, programming
- Jeff Fenster – A&R
- Jeff Gilligan – art direction, design
- Johnny Hamlin – management
- Don Ienner – management
- Ted Jensen – mastering
- Max Monet – programming
- Matt Radosevich – producer, programming
- Eric Valentine – producer, programming
- Butch Walker – producer, programming
