= Simple Life (Megan and Liz EP) =

EP by Megan and Liz
- Released: June 3, 2014
- Recorded: 2013–2014
- Genre: Country, country pop
- Length: 25:31
- Label: Hidden Cow, Inc.

Megan and Liz chronology
Bad for Me (2012)	Simple Life (2014)	Deux (2016)

Singles from Simple Life
- 1. "Simple Life" Released: April 23, 2014; 2. "New At This" Released: May 28, 2014

Simple Life is the fifth official EP by American duo Megan and Liz. It was released independently on June 3, 2014, through Hidden Cow Inc, two months after the duo parted ways with their past record company, Collective Sounds. The album marks the duo's shift toward a country-influenced sound, a departure from the pop influences of their previous material. The EP was announced through an interview with Billboard magazine, when the duo revealed their split from Collective Sounds, and the title track of the EP, Simple Life. The day the album was released, it went to number four on the Top Country Albums chart on iTunes.

== Background ==
In 2013, the duo began recording for their debut album with Collective Sounds. They recorded with many artists, songwriters, and producers, including Allstar Weekend,Toby Gad, Nathan Chapman, Jason Reeves, John Fields, and Liz Huett, a former backup singer of Taylor Swift's. They confirmed the tracks, "Bad for Me," "Release You," "Switch Hearts," "All Alright," "Look What You Started," "Karma's Coming Back for Me", and "Grave." When they parted ways with their record company, Collective Sounds, Megan spoke about leaving the company, which was closing down permanently. "We have had great success to date with The Collective and we would like to thank them for offering us an incredible opportunity," said Megan. "Both myself and Liz are saddened by the closing of the label, but we are grateful to have had the chance to play a part in its success. We have learned so much from the experience and we are excited to continue to grow as artists and creating music that is true to our hearts. While embarking on this new journey is scary, it is necessary to carry out our vision for ourselves and our fans." The new album contains three of the songs originally confirmed for the duo's debut album, "Grave", "Switch Hearts", and "Karma's Coming Back for Me." The duo no longer owns the songs intended for the original record, so the production style had to change to avoid legal issues.

== Songs and lyrics ==
The album contains elements of country and pop. The album's title track, "Simple Life" speaks their own lives, and how they "got no jobs", and "got no money. The song also mentions "riding around in the Chevy", a typical reference in a country song. The next track, "A Better Me" is a bit more poppy than "Simple Life", but still proudly broadcasts the country instruments. "Karma's Coming Back For Me" has prominent banjos at the beginning but has a less smooth sounding production compared to the first sing.e. The next song, "New at This" has a similar message to Simple Life but has a catchy upbeat production. This is rumored to be the second single of the EP."Night of Our Lives" is a song, similar to their release with Collective Sounds, In The Shadows Tonight. "Switch Hearts" is the most poppy song on the album, reminiscent of the duo's old songs. The lyrics speak of a bad break up. The final song, "Grave" is the most country song on the album. It speaks of a cheater, but is a made-up song, as the twins said at their StageIt performance in October 2013.

== Critical reception ==
The album received generally positive reviews. Backseat Mafia praised the album, saying it "has a personal feel to it that will give fans a much more involving listening experience than before." J-14 praised the song "New At This", saying it is "addicting." Just Jared Jr. said the EP is full of "soothing sounds and lyrics that actually mean something." They also praised "Karma's Coming Back for Me" and "Switch Hearts", saying that they "fell in love" with the songs. Cult Noise Magazine also reviewed the album, saying it "showcased a new era for Megan & Liz," with the switch from pop to country. Fountain Pen Girl Blog gave the album a 9/10 rating, stating that "Simple Life", Karma's Coming Back for Me", and "New At This" are the highlights, while the other songs can get a bit repetitive at times. Its average rating on iTunes as of June 23, 2014, is 5 stars.

== Track listing ==
Simple Life
No.	Title	Writer(s)	Length
1.	"Simple Life"	Elizabeth Mace; Megan Mace; Daniel Kalisher	3:31
2.	"A Better Me"	E. Mace; M. Mace; Kalisher	3:39
3.	"Karma's Coming Back for Me"	E. Mace; M. Mace	4:06
4.	"New At This"	E. Mace; M. Mace; Kalisher	3:22
5.	"Night of Our Lives"	E. Mace; M. Mace; Kevin Griffin	4:01
6.	"Switch Hearts"	E. Mace; M. Mace; Michael Shimshack	3:10
7.	"Grave"	E. Mace; M. Mace	3:42
Total length:			25:31

== Chart performance ==
Chart (2014)	Peak position
US Billboard Top Country Albums	35
US Billboard Top Heatseekers	8
US Billboard Independent Albums	50
