= Whatever (Hot Chelle Rae album) =

Studio album by Hot Chelle Rae
- Released: November 29, 2011
- Recorded: 2010–11
- Genre: Pop rock
- Length: 34:04
- Label: RCA/Jive
- Producer: Emanuel Kiriakou; S*A*M and Sluggo; Andrew Goldstein; Dan Book; Alexei Misoul

Hot Chelle Rae chronology
Lovesick Electric (2009)	Whatever (2011)	Recklessly (2014)

Singles from Whatever
- 1. "Tonight Tonight" Released: January 25, 2011; 2. "I Like It Like That" Released: October 4, 2011; 3. "Honestly" Released: March 22, 2012

Professional ratings
Aggregate scores
Source	Rating
Metacritic	62/100
Review scores
Source	Rating
Absolute Punk	55%
AllMusic	3.5/5 stars
Audiopinions	9/10 stars
Billboard	8/10 stars
Blast	C
Entertainment Weekly	B
Los Angeles Times	1/4 stars
Melodic	2/5 stars
USA Today	3.5/4 stars

Whatever is the second studio album by American pop rock band Hot Chelle Rae. It was released by RCA Records on November 29, 2011, to generally favorable reviews from music critics. Three singles were released from the album: "Tonight Tonight" and "I Like It Like That", featuring New Boyz, and "Honestly".

== Background ==
Hot Chelle Rae released their single "Tonight Tonight" in March 2011, prior to the release of their "Whatever" album the following November. The success of this single, which went double Platinum, led to Hot Chelle Rae being named the 2011 winners of the AMA's "Best New Artist" award. The band then spent the summer of 2011 touring with artists including Mike Posner, Justin Bieber, We the Kings, and the Script.

Hot Chelle Rae released their second single "I Like It Like That" in October 2011, before releasing the full "Whatever" album on November 29, 2011.

The cover art of the "Whatever" album, which features the four band members in separate colored squares was referred to by Cambio.com as drawing "inspiration from something in between the memory game Simon and the work of Andy Warhol".

== Reception ==
Whatever gained mixed reviews from music critics. It holds a Metacritic "generally positive reviews" score of 62 out of 100. Allmusic gave it 3 and a half stars, and stated that Whatever "may not be a formula designed for critical acclaim or longevity, but pop music has always been exactly like this and HCR would make Bobby Vee, the Archies, and the New Radicals proud."

The album debuted at number 48 on the Billboard 200, selling over 18,000 copies in its first week, and debuted at number 166 in Canada.

"Whatever" gained recognition from critics including USA Today's Brian Mansfield for the multitude of pop-culture references in its tracks. The songs of the "Whatever" album include many notable references to 2011 pop culture including the actor Zach Galifianakis, the Hollywood Sign, beer pong, Facebook, and Skype.

Music critic Jon Caramanica of The New York Times compared Hot Chelle Rae's "Whatever" album to "the early breakthroughs" of bands including Sum 41 and Blink-182.

Although many critics gave "Whatever" relatively positive reviews, others criticized the album as lacking staying power, or being relatable mainly to teen audiences. In a November 2011 review on the website The Wrap, music critic Chris Williams said the album, "has captivated the Radio Disney demographic, but more mature listeners will take the impassive album title to heart".

== Track listing ==
The track listing was revealed on October 25, 2011. Songwriting credits and producers per album liner notes.

All lyrics are written by Ryan Follese and Nash Overstreet, except track 1, co-written by Dominic Anthony Thomas and Earl Henry Benjamin, track 5, co-written by Bei Maejor and others, track 8, written by Nash Overstreet and Martin Johnson.

No.	Title	Music	Producer(s)	Length
1.	"I Like It Like That" (featuring New Boyz)	Ryan Follese; Nash Overstreet; Andrew Goldstein; Dan Book; Alexei Misoul; Emanuel Kiriakou; Evan Kidd Bogart; Lindy Robbins	Kiriakou; Goldstein	3:08
2.	"Tonight Tonight"	Follese; Overstreet; Kiriakou; Bogart; Robbins	Kiriakou	3:20
3.	"Honestly"	Overstreet; Ian Keaggy; Claude Kelly; Sam Hollander; Dave Katz; Keith Follesé; Scott Pearson Mann; Chad Royce	S*A*M and Sluggo; (co.)Royce; Mann	3:22
4.	"Keep You with Me"	Follese; Overstreet; Goldstein; Book; Alexei Misoul	Goldstein; Book; Misoul; (co.)Kiriakou	3:30
5.	"Radio" (featuring Bei Maejor)	Follese; Overstreet; Kiriakou; Bogart; Robbins; Bryan Folk; Brandon Green	Kiriakou; (co.)Goldstein	3:04
6.	"Whatever"	Follese; Overstreet; Goldstein; Book; Misoul	Goldstein; Book; Misoul	2:53
7.	"Forever Unstoppable"	Follese; Overstreet; Goldstein; Book; Misoul	Goldstein; Book; Misoul	4:03
8.	"Why Don't You Love Me?" (featuring Demi Lovato)	Overstreet; Martin Johnson	Goldstein; Book; Misoul	3:31
9.	"Downtown Girl"	Follese; Overstreet; Golstein; Book; Misoul; Jamie Moore	Goldstein; Book; Misoul	2:57
10.	"Beautiful Freaks"	Follese; Overstreet; Kiriakou; Bogar; Robbins	Kiriakou; (co.)Goldstein; Jens Koerkemeier	3:26
11.	"The Only One"	Follese; Overstreet; Ian Keaggy; Jesse Frasure	Goldstein; Book; Misoul	2:50
Total length:				34:04

Japanese bonus tracks
No.	Title	Length
12.	"Come Back to California"	3:38
13.	"I Wish"	3:14
14.	"Tonight Tonight" (Kat Krazy Remix)	3:17
15.	"I Like It Like That" (Goldstein Remix)	3:43

== Personnel ==
Hot Chelle Rae

- Ryan Follesé – lead vocals, guitar, keyboard
- Nash Overstreet – guitars, backing vocals
- Ian Keaggy – bass, backing vocals
- Jamie Follesé – drums, percussion

Production

- Emanuel Kiriakou – producer
- S*A*M and Sluggo – producer
- Alexei Misoul – producer
- Andrew Goldstein – producer, mixing
- Dan Book – producer
- Scott Mann – producer
- Chad Royce – producer
- Jens Koerkemier – additional production
- Nash Overstreet – additional production
- Matty Green – mixing
- Serban Ghenea – mixing
- Sarah Kraus – photography

== Charts ==
Weekly chart performance for Whatever
Chart (2011–2012)	Peak position
Australian Albums (ARIA)	21
Belgian Heatseekers Albums (Ultratop Flanders)	20
Canadian Albums (Nielsen SoundScan)	166
Japanese Albums (Oricon)	26
New Zealand Albums (RMNZ)	21
US Billboard 200	48

== Certifications ==
Certifications for Whatever
Region	Certification	Certified units/sales
New Zealand (RMNZ)	Platinum	15,000^{‡}
^{‡} Sales+streaming figures based on certification alone.
