= Ever After (disambiguation) =

Ever After may refer to:

- Ever After (or Ever After: A Cinderella Story), a 1998 American film starring Drew Barrymore and Anjelica Huston
  - Ever After (musical), a 2015 musical adaptation starring Christine Ebersole
- Ever After (The Three O'Clock album), the 2nd studio album by American alternative rock group The Three O'Clock
- Ever After (The Mission album), a 2000 live album by UK band The Mission
- Ever After (Fayray album), the 2nd studio album by Japanese singer songwriter Fayray
- Ever After (Marianas Trench album), the 3rd studio album from Canadian band Marianas Trench
- Ever After, a web comic by Shaun Healey hosted by Snafu Comics
- Ever After, a novel by Graham Swift
- Ever After, the name of the demon realm in and one of the books of the Hollows series by Kim Harrison
- "Ever After", the debut single by Gabi DeMartino
- "Ever After", a song by Neil Young from Chrome Dreams II
- Either or all of afterlife, eternity, immortality

== See also ==
- The Ever After, a 2014 American drama film starring its writers Teresa Palmer and Mark Webber
- Ever After High
- Happily Ever After (disambiguation)
- Happy Ever After (disambiguation)
