= Chord Overstreet =

American actor, singer and musician (born 1989)

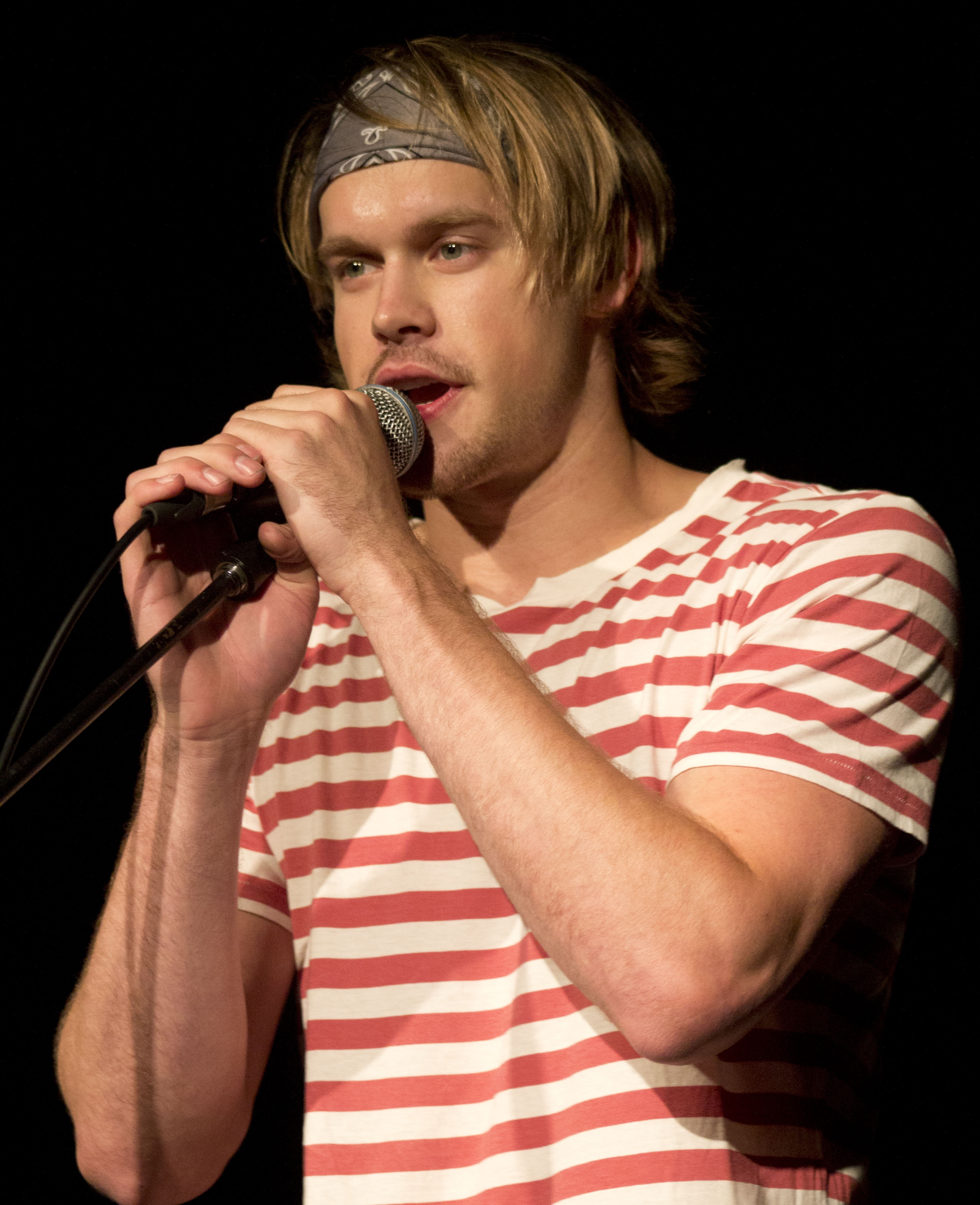
- Overstreet in 2013

Background information
- Born: Chord Paul Overstreet; February 17, 1989 (age 37); Nashville, Tennessee, U.S.
- Genres: Pop; country
- Occupations: Actor; singer; songwriter
- Instruments: Vocals; guitar; harmonica
- Years active: 2009–present
- Labels: Island; Safehouse

Chord Paul Overstreet (born February 17, 1989) is an American actor and musician. He is best known for his role as Sam Evans on the Fox television series Glee (2009–2015). He has starred in the Apple TV+ comedy series Acapulco (2021–2025).

After signing to Safehouse Records, he began a career as a solo musical artist. On August 26, 2016, he released his debut single, "Homeland", through Safehouse and Island Records. In 2017, he released the single "Hold On", which was certified double Platinum in the United States.

== Early life ==
Overstreet was born in Nashville, Tennessee, to hairdresser Julie (née Miller) and country music singer-songwriter Paul Overstreet. He has an older brother, Nash Overstreet (born 1986), who plays guitar in the band Hot Chelle Rae; an older sister, Summer (born 1987); and three younger sisters, Harmony, Skye and Charity. He is of German, Irish and English descent. He was named after the musical term. He was raised on a farm outside of Nashville. Encouraged by his parents to pursue music, he started playing the mandolin at an early age, and moved on to the drums, flute, piano and guitar. He is also a songwriter. In his teenage years, he modeled for advertisements for Hollister, Famous Footwear and Gap. He was homeschooled.

== Career ==
=== 2009–2015: Beginnings and Glee ===
Overstreet began to pursue his passion of performing after his high school graduation in 2007. After two unsuccessful years, Overstreet started his acting career on the web series Private as Josh Hollis. He was also featured in an episode of iCarly titled "iSpeed Date" and starred in the unaired pilot of No Ordinary Family. His first film role was that of Adam in the 2009 thriller The Hole, and he starred in the 2011 film A Warrior's Heart as Dupree, alongside Ashley Greene and Kellan Lutz.

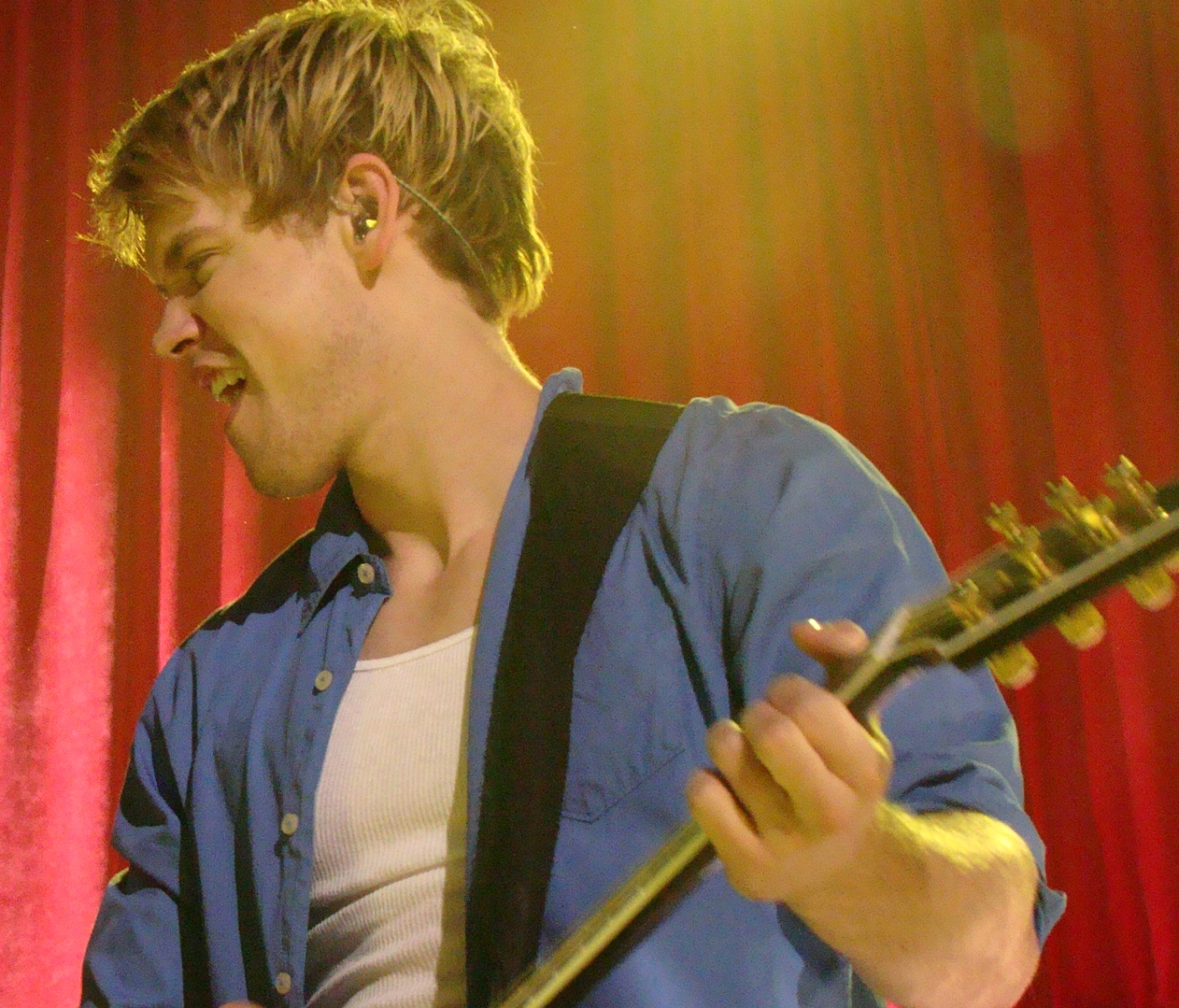
Overstreet as Sam Evans on the Glee Live! In Concert! tour, 2011

Overstreet played the character of Sam Evans, a transfer student and athlete, on the FOX comedy-drama television series Glee. He landed the role after auditioning with the Commodores' song "Easy" and Gavin DeGraw's "I Don't Want to Be". He later sang "Billionaire" by Travie McCoy featuring Bruno Mars as a studio test, and eventually sang this in his debut episode titled "Audition". His cover of "Billionaire" was released as a single and charted at No. 15 in Ireland, #24 in Canada, #28 in the United States, and #34 in Australia. On April 21, 2011, the video for Hot Chelle Rae's "Tonight Tonight" was released on YouTube and featured a series of cameos of Overstreet alternately making out with a girl (whom he stole from the lead singer) on an office copier, DJing at a club, then playing guitar and mugging for the crowd with his brother, Hot Chelle Rae band member, Nash.

On July 1, 2011, TVLine's Michael Ausiello broke the news that Overstreet's contract option to become a series regular on Glee had not been picked up for season 3, but that he could possibly come back as an occasional guest star. In reaction to the announcement, fans launched a campaign to promote Overstreet's cover of "Billionaire" and various tags related to the actor, most notably "#DontCutTheChord", began trending on Twitter. The song made its way into the iTunes top 5 Glee charts during the campaign.

At the 2011 Comic-Con event, Glee co-creator Brad Falchuk reported that they had offered Overstreet a ten-episode deal with a possibility to become a series regular at mid-season, but that Overstreet had declined the option. Overstreet later stated to Ausiello during an interview that he had decided to leave the show to focus on his music career, explaining: "They offered me the chance to come back for a few episodes, but there was nothing guaranteed so I decided to dive into the music thing." It was reported on October 18, 2011, and confirmed by series co-creator Ryan Murphy six days later, that Overstreet would be returning to Glee as a recurring character starting with the third season's eighth episode. On July 23, 2012, it was confirmed that Overstreet would be a series regular for the fourth season of Glee, where he continued until the last season.

=== 2015–present: Music career, acting ===
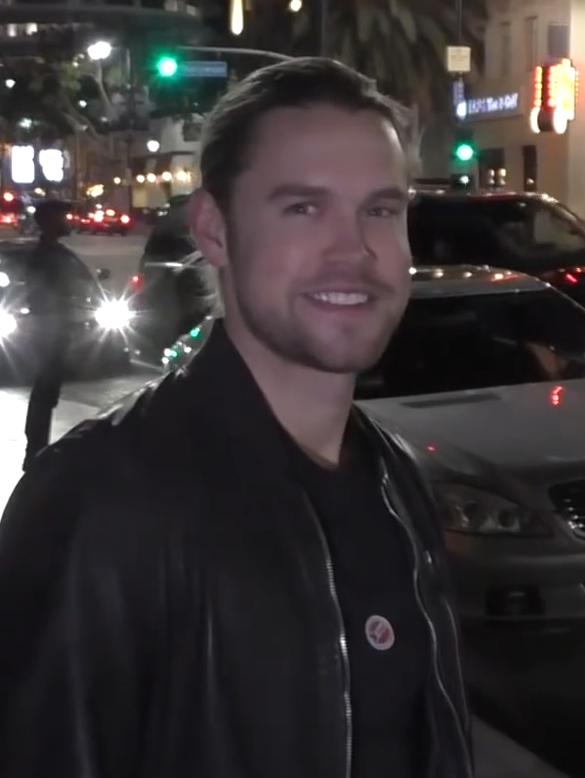
Overstreet in 2016

Chord has cited James Taylor, David Gray, Jimmy Buffett, Bob Dylan, Paul Simon, and Hall & Oates as musicians that inspire him. On December 15, 2015, Overstreet signed a recording contract with Safehouse Records, a record label founded by Demi Lovato, Nick Jonas and Phil McIntyre. He was the first artist to be signed to the label. He opened for Lovato and Jonas on several tour dates of their Future Now Tour in summer 2016.

On August 26, 2016, Chord released his first solo single, "Homeland", through Island Records and Safehouse Records. Digital Journal called it "a fitting homage to his hometown", giving the song a five star rating. A music video for the song premiered through Billboard on October 7, 2016. In September 2016, Overstreet revealed that he was working on an EP. In December 2016, he released a cover of "All I Want for Christmas Is a Real Good Tan", written by Overstreet's father and originally recorded by Kenny Chesney. Overstreet released the single, "Hold On" on February 3, 2017. Though the song failed to impact any charts, it was certified double platinum certification by the RIAA in August 2021. On May 12, 2017, he released his first EP, Tree House Tapes. In June 2017, he was picked as Elvis Duran's Artist of the Month and performed "Hold On" on NBC's Today show. He also performed the song on The Tonight Show Starring Jimmy Fallon on August 14, 2017.

Overstreet made appearances as a guest star in a number of television series including The Bold Type, Royalties, and Pickle and Peanut. In 2021, he joined the cast of Acapulco, an Apple TV+ comedy series set in 1984.

In 2020, he starred in the comedy film The Swing of Things, which was released on Hulu. He starred in the 2022 romantic comedy film Falling for Christmas opposite Lindsay Lohan.

== Personal life ==
Overstreet comes from a musical family. His father is American country singer Paul Overstreet and his older brother is Nash Overstreet, the lead guitarist in the pop rock band Hot Chelle Rae. Overstreet dated British actress Emma Watson in 2018.

== Filmography ==
=== Film ===
Year	Title	Role	Notes
2009	The Hole	Adam	
2011	A Warrior's Heart	Dupree	
2011	Glee: The 3D Concert Movie	Sam Evans	Concert film
2015	4th Man Out	Nick	
2020	The Swing of Things	Tom	
2022	Falling for Christmas	Jake Russell	

=== Television ===
Year	Title	Role	Notes
2009	iCarly	Eric	Episode: "iSpeed Date"
2009	Private	Joshua Hollis	Recurring role
2010	No Ordinary Family	Lucas Fisher	Episode: "Unaired Pilot"
2010–2015	Glee	Sam Evans	Main role (seasons 4–6); Recurring role (seasons 2–3); 91 episodes
2011	The Middle	Ralph Wilkerson	Episode: "Hecking Order"
2013	Regular Show	Dusty B (voice)	Episode: "The Thanksgiving Special"
2015	Be Cool, Scooby-Doo!	Mitchell / Andrew (voice)	Episode: "Mystery 101"
2016–2017	Pickle and Peanut	Scampi / Brandon (voice)	Episode: "Gregazoids/Meat Ballers"
2020	The Bold Type	Evan Sloan	Episode: "Stardust"
2020	Royalties	Switchback Jacket Singer	Episode: "I Am So Much Better Than You at Everything"
2021–2025	Acapulco	Chad Davies	Main role
2024	Doctor Odyssey	Sam	Episode: "Singles Week"

=== Music videos ===
Year	Title	Artist
2010	"Lucky"	Glee Cast
2011	"Tonight Tonight"	Hot Chelle Rae
2016	"Bacon"	Nick Jonas

== Discography ==
=== As Chord Overstreet ===
==== Extended plays ====
Title	Extended play details
Tree House Tapes	Released: May 12, 2017; Label: Island, Safehouse; Format: Digital download
Stone Man	Released: June 21, 2021; Label: Whiskey River / Create Music Group Inc.; Format: Digital download

==== Singles ====
Year	Title	Album	Certifications
2016	"Homeland"	Non-album singles	
2016	"All I Want for Christmas Is a Real Good Tan"	Non-album singles	
2017	"Hold On"	Non-album singles	BPI: Platinum; FIMI: Gold; RIAA: 2× Platinum
2018	"We've Got Tonight"	Muscle Shoals: Small Town, Big Sound	
2019	"Love You To Death"	Non-album singles	
2020	"Heartache Song" (Live Acoustic)	Non-album singles	
2020	"Sunflower"	Non-album singles	
2020	"What You Need"	Non-album singles	
2020	"Cold Feet"	Non-album singles	
2020	"Water Into Wine"	Non-album singles	
2021	"Beautiful Disaster"	Stone Man	
2021	"Stone Man"	Stone Man	
2021	"What's Left of You"	Stone Man	
2021	"Sunkissed"	Non-album singles	
2021	"Good Times"	Non-album singles	

==== As featured artist ====
Year	Title	Album
2021	"Do The Damn Thing" (Hot Chelle Rae feat. Chord Overstreet and LEVI)	Non-album single

=== As OVERSTREET ===
==== Extended plays ====
Title	Extended play details
Man on the Moon	Released: July 26, 2019; Label: Whiskey River, Inc.; Format: Digital download
OVERSTREET	Released: January 15, 2021; Label: Allies Nippon; Format: Digital download

==== Singles ====
Year	Title	Album
2018	"Wasted Time"	Non-album singles
2018	"Carried Away"	Non-album singles
2019	"All Nighter"	Man on the Moon
2019	"Sex on Fire"	Man on the Moon
2019	"On The Way"	Man on the Moon
2019	"My Ex"	OVERSTREET
2019	"Addicted"	Non-album single
2020	"Die"	OVERSTREET
2020	"For a Heartache"	OVERSTREET
2020	"Summertime"	OVERSTREET
2020	"Blue"	OVERSTREET

== Tours ==
Co-headlining

- Glee Cast – Glee Live! In Concert! (2011)

Opening act

- Demi Lovato and Nick Jonas – Future Now Tour (2016) (selected dates)

== Awards and nominations ==
Year	Award	Category	Work	Result
2011	Screen Actors Guild Awards	Outstanding Performance by an Ensemble in a Comedy Series	Glee	Nominated
2012	Screen Actors Guild Awards	Outstanding Performance by an Ensemble in a Comedy Series	Glee	Nominated
2012	Hollywood Teen TV Awards	Favorite Breakout Star	Glee	Nominated
2013	Screen Actors Guild Awards	Outstanding Performance by an Ensemble in a Comedy Series	Glee	Nominated
2013	Teen Choice Awards	Choice TV: Male Scene Stealer	Glee	Won
2014	Teen Choice Awards	Choice TV Actor: Comedy	Glee	Nominated
