= Honestly (Hot Chelle Rae song) =

Single by Hot Chelle Rae

from the album Whatever
- Released: March 22, 2012
- Recorded: 2011
- Genre: Pop rock
- Length: 3:22
- Label: RCA
- Songwriters: Keith Follesé; Sam Hollander; Dave Katz; Ian Keaggy; Claude Kelly; Scott Pearson Mann; Nash Overstreet; Chad Royce

Hot Chelle Rae singles chronology
"I Like It Like That" (2011)	"Honestly" (2012)	"Jingle Bell Rock" (2012)

Music video
- "Honestly" on YouTube

"Honestly" is a song by American rock band Hot Chelle Rae. It was released as the third single from their second album Whatever on March 22, 2012. The song premiered exclusively via Alternative Press on March 7, 2012. The song was written by Ryan Follese, Nash Overstreet, Ian Keaggy, C. Kelly, Sam Hollander, Dave Katz and produced by S*A*M and Sluggo, Chad Royce, and Scott Mann.

== Critical reception ==
Scott Shelter of PopCrush stated, "Hot Chelle Rae have created a tell-off tune for anyone whose young love doesn't work out as planned. Though some elements of the track, like the 'Hey!' and 'Oh!' chants during the chorus, feel a little too by-the-numbers, the song's infectious nature makes it a solid follow-up to recent hits 'Tonight Tonight' and 'I Like It Like That'."

== Music video ==
The music video for the song was released on March 23, 2012 and March 24th on ABC Family during Radio Rebel and featuring actress Ashley Benson from Pretty Little Liars.

== Track listing ==
Digital download
No.	Title	Length
1.	"Honestly"	3:22

== Credits and personnel ==
- Lead vocals – Hot Chelle Rae
- Producers – S*A*M and Sluggo, Chad Royce, Scott Mann
- Lyrics – Ryan Follese, Nash Overstreet, Ian Keaggy, C. Kelly, Sam Hollander, Dave Katz
- Label: RCA Records

== Charts ==
Chart (2012)	Peak position
Belgium (Ultratip Bubbling Under Flanders)	64
US Bubbling Under Hot 100 (Billboard)	20
US Pop Airplay (Billboard)	30

== Release history ==
Release dates and formats for "Honestly"
Region	Date	Format	Label(s)	Ref.
United States	March 27, 2012	Mainstream airplay	RCA	
