= Bad for Me (Megan and Liz song) =

Single by Megan and Liz

from the album Bad for Me
- Released: July 31, 2012
- Genre: Teen pop, dance-pop
- Length: 3:03
- Label: Collective Sounds
- Songwriters: Megan Mace, Elizabeth Mace, Rob Hawkins, Martin Johnson

Music video
- "Bad for Me" on YouTube

"Bad for Me" is a debut single by the American pop duo Megan and Liz, released on July 31, 2012. The sisters co-wrote the song with Rob Hawkins and producer Martin Johnson of Boys Like Girls and additional production by EDM group Cash Cash . It peaked at #34 on the US Pop Songs chart.

== Promotion ==
The song's release was first announced in July 2012. They held a Ustream party the night of the song's release onto iTunes to promote the new single. The song peaked at #70 on the iTunes Top 100 during its debut week.

The girls embarked on a nationwide radio tour beginning in the latter half of 2012 to promote "Bad for Me", performing it acoustically at each station visited. They also visited the Seventeen magazine headquarters, which got them a picture in the October 2012 issue.

They won the chance to be featured as an act at the iHeart Radio Music Festival in Las Vegas, Nevada in September 2012. The duo performed "Bad for Me", as well as their anti-bullying anthem, "Are You Happy Now?" The festival also put together an intro for their act, titled "The Road to Vegas". Their performance was featured on national television during The CW's broadcast of the festival on October 1, 2012.

On October 8, 2012, they had an on-air interview with Radio Disney and from then onwards, the station added the song to their circulation. The song is currently ranked at #14 on the station's weekly "Top 30 Countdown". They were also featured in a Halloween video byte.

== Reception ==
Jon Caramanica of The New York Times called the song a "tidal rush of teen spite, delivered with cheery plasticity," with attention to the line "This one's for the girls, messing with the boys/Like he's the melody and she's background noise." He also mentions that the duo are "refreshingly pure pop" and "peppy and irresistible." Jocelyn Rubin of RyanSeacrest.com describes the song as a classic pop anthem with a hip-hop beat.

== Music video ==
The music video for "Bad for Me" was shot in conjunction with their television ad for Macy's in June 2012. They first caught the attention of the retail chain when they were the fan-voted winners of the iHeart Radio Rising Star contest.

The video has surpassed three million views on YouTube as of March 2013.

== Charts ==
Chart (2012)	Peak position
US Billboard Pop Songs	34

== Release history ==
Release dates and formats for "Bad for Me"
Region	Date	Format	Label(s)	Ref.
United States	August 21, 2012	Mainstream airplay	Collective Sounds	
