= Saint Hoax =

Syrian artist and activist

Saint Hoax is a pseudonymous Syrian internet personality, artist, satirist and socio-political activist. They use various mediums to subversively depict political and popular figures and raise awareness of political and societal issues.

== Career ==
=== Social awareness ===
==== Happy Never After ====
In 2014, Saint Hoax published their campaign Happy Never After. The artist used images of Disney princesses to spread awareness about domestic violence. The princesses were illustrated with bruises on their faces and a slogan that read "When did he stop treating you like a princess?" accompanied the visuals. Hours after the posters were published on the artist's website, the campaign went viral. Happy Never After became one of the most shared domestic violence campaign. In November 2014, it was used as the official anti-domestic violence campaign in Amsterdam.

== Social media ==
Saint Hoax uses social media, particularly Instagram, as their main platform. They’re mostly known for posting edited videos and images that satirize political and pop cultural figures. They covered the 2021 Met Gala as a "Meme Correspondent."

== Exhibitions ==
=== Solo exhibitions ===
- 2018: "MonuMental", Plastik Gallery, Beirut
- 2016: "Is That All There Is ", Guy Hepner, New York
- 2015: "POPlitically Incorrect", The Adler Subhashok Gallery, Bangkok

=== Group exhibitions ===
- 2015: Art Palm Beach, The Adler Subhashok Gallery, Florida
- 2014: Singapore Art Fair, The Adler Subhashok Gallery, Singapore
- 2014: Beirut Art Fair, Plastik Gallery, Beirut
