= I Like It Like That (Hot Chelle Rae song) =

Single by Hot Chelle Rae featuring New Boyz

from the album Whatever
- Released: October 4, 2011
- Recorded: 2011
- Genre: Pop rock
- Length: 3:08; 2:46 (no rap version)
- Label: RCA/Jive
- Songwriters: Ryan Follese; Nash Overstreet; Andrew Goldstein; Dan Book; Alexei Misoul; Emanuel Kiriakou; Evan Kidd Bogart; Lindy Robbins; E. Benjamin; D. Thomas
- Producers: Emanuel Kiriakou; Andrew Goldstein

Hot Chelle Rae singles chronology
"Tonight Tonight" (2011)	"I Like It Like That" (2011)	"Honestly" (2012)

New Boyz singles chronology
"Better with the Lights Off" (2011)	"I Like It Like That" (2011)	"FMS" (2012)

Music video
- "I Like It Like That " on YouTube

"I Like It Like That" is a song by American rock band Hot Chelle Rae. It was released as the second single from their second album Whatever on October 4, 2011. "I Like It Like That" was released to mainstream radio on September 27, 2011. The song features vocals from American hip hop group New Boyz. The song peaked at number 28 on the Billboard Hot 100 in the U.S.

== Composition ==
"I Like It Like That" was written by Andrew Goldstein, Ryan Follese, Nash Overstreet, Dan Book, Alexei Misoul, Emanuel Kiriakou, Evan Kidd Bogart, Lindy Robbins, E. Benjamin and D. Thomas. According to Overstreet, the song was written in a garage in Grenada Hills, California.

== Critical reception ==
"I Like It Like That" was met with mixed reviews from music critics. MTV described the track a "polished, hook-laden, synthy pop-rock record." Jenna Hally Rubenstein of MTV stated, "'I Like It Like That' would have been a perfect accompaniment to the middle-of-summer heat, but let's just act like fall's not coming and keep this track on repeat anyway." Shahryar Rizvi of the Dallas Observer gave a negative review of the song calling it "mediocre." He was critical of the track for its cliché lyrics and stated the collaboration with New Boyz, "meager."

== Music video ==
A music video to accompany the release of "I Like It Like That" was first released on October 7, 2011, at a total length of three minutes and thirty-one seconds. The video has since reached 31 million views.

== Edited version ==
The song has been used and promoted to kids on Radio Disney. There is an edited or "clean" version of the song that replaces "damn" with "yeah" or "hey", "make the girls take it all off" with "all the girls singing along", "as the cops roll up" with "as my friends roll up", "Pour the cops a cup" with "turn the music up", "bought out the bar" with "valet'd the car", and "drinks on me" with "follow me".

== Track listing ==
- Digital download
1. I Like It Like That (feat. New Boyz) – 3:08
2. I Like It Like That (Goldstein Remix) – 4:30
3. I Like It Like That (Vanguard Remix) – 3:44

== Charts ==
=== Weekly charts ===
Weekly chart performance for "I Like It Like That"
Chart (2011–2012)	Peak position
Australia (ARIA)	17
Belgium (Ultratip Bubbling Under Flanders)	7
Belgium (Ultratip Bubbling Under Wallonia)	20
Canada Hot 100 (Billboard)	59
Canada CHR/Top 40 (Billboard)	48
Canada Hot AC (Billboard)	42
Japan Hot 100 (Billboard)	15
Netherlands (Single Top 100)	73
New Zealand (Recorded Music NZ)	9
Slovakia Airplay (ČNS IFPI)	80
US Billboard Hot 100	28
US Adult Pop Airplay (Billboard)	18
US Pop Airplay (Billboard)	15

=== Year-end charts ===
Year-end chart performance for "I Like It Like That"
Chart (2012)	Position
Netherlands (Dutch Top 40)	148

== Certifications ==
Certifications for "I Like It Like That"
Region	Certification	Certified units/sales
Australia (ARIA)	2× Platinum	140,000^{^}
New Zealand (RMNZ)	Platinum	15,000^{*}
United States (RIAA)	Platinum	1,000,000^{*}
^{*} Sales figures based on certification alone.^{^} Shipments figures based on certification alone.

== Release history ==
Release dates and formats for "I Like It Like That"
Region	Date	Format	Label(s)	Ref.
United States	September 27, 2011	Mainstream airplay	Jive	
