= Tonight Tonight (Hot Chelle Rae song) =

Single by Hot Chelle Rae

from the album Whatever
- Released: January 25, 2011
- Recorded: 2010
- Genre: Pop rock; dance-rock
- Length: 3:20
- Label: RCA/Jive
- Songwriters: Lindy Robbins; Emanuel Kiriakou; Evan Kidd Bogart; Nash Overstreet; Ryan Follesé
- Producer: Kiriakou

Hot Chelle Rae singles chronology
"Bleed" (2010)	"Tonight Tonight" (2011)	"I Like It Like That" (2011)

"Tonight Tonight" is a song by American rock band Hot Chelle Rae. It was released as the lead single from their second album Whatever on January 25, 2011. "Tonight Tonight" was released to mainstream radio on February 22, 2011. It is the band's most commercially successful single, peaking at number seven on the Billboard Hot 100 and being certified double platinum by the Recording Industry Association of America. The single has also sold over 3 million copies as of April 2013.

== Composition ==
"Tonight Tonight" is written in the key of E major, with the vocal range spanning from D♯_{3} to B_{4}, with a tempo of 100 beats per minute. The song was written by Lindy Robbins, Evan Kidd Bogart, Nash Overstreet and Ryan Follesé while production was handled by Emanuel Kiriakou who also co-wrote the track.

== Music video ==
The video features the band performing on a rooftop, as well as attending a kid's birthday party, where bassist Ian Keaggy is given a tattoo. Nash's brother Chord Overstreet also appears in the video.

== Critical reception ==
"Tonight Tonight" was received well by critics, with Carolyn Giannini of The Sacramento Press saying that it had "summer anthem potential" and Brian Mansfield of USA Today saying it had "the makings of one of the catchiest pop-rock anthems of the summer."

== Track listing ==
Digital download
No.	Title	Length
1.	"Tonight Tonight"	3:20

Tonight Tonight EP
No.	Title	Length
1.	"Tonight Tonight (Radio Disney version)"	3:20
2.	"Bleed"	3:53
3.	"I Like to Dance" (MattRad remix)	3:58
4.	"Let Down"	2:44
5.	"Bleed" (music video)	2:44
6.	"I Like to Dance" (music video)	2:44

The Remixes
No.	Title	Length
1.	"Tonight Tonight" (Goldstein remix)	3:28
2.	"Tonight Tonight" (Kat Krazy remix)	3:16
3.	"Tonight Tonight" (Riddler remix)	5:06

== Personnel ==
Credits for "Tonight Tonight" adapted from AllMusic.

Hot Chelle Rae

- Ryan Follese – lead vocals, rhythm guitar
- Nash Overstreet – lead guitar, backing vocals, percussion
- Ian Keaggy – bass, backing vocals
- Jamie Follese – drums, percussion

Production

- Evan Kidd Bogart – composer
- Mark Endert – mixing
- Serban Ghenea – mixing
- John Hamlin – producer
- Robyn Heart – composer
- Christian Heuer – producer
- Emanuel Kiriakou – producer
- Sarah Kraus – photography
- Max Monet – additional production, composer, producer
- Luga Podesta – director
- Matt Radosevich – additional production, mixing, producer, remixing
- Lindy Robbins – composer
- Michael Tedesco – A&R
- Eric Valentine – additional production, producer
- Brian Welsh – producer

== Charts ==
=== Weekly charts ===
Weekly chart performance for "Tonight Tonight"
Chart (2011–2012)	Peak position
Australia (ARIA)	7
Belgium (Ultratip Bubbling Under Flanders)	6
Belgium (Ultratip Bubbling Under Wallonia)	12
Canada Hot 100 (Billboard)	10
Canada CHR/Top 40 (Billboard)	13
Canada Hot AC (Billboard)	11
Hungary (Editors' Choice Top 40)	37
Japan Hot 100 (Billboard)	5
Mexico Ingles Airplay (Billboard)	13
Netherlands (Dutch Top 40)	6
Netherlands (Single Top 100)	16
New Zealand (Recorded Music NZ)	16
Sweden (Sverigetopplistan)	36
US Billboard Hot 100	7
US Adult Contemporary (Billboard)	19
US Adult Pop Airplay (Billboard)	1
US Pop Airplay (Billboard)	5

=== Year-end charts ===
2011 year-end chart performance for "Tonight Tonight"
Chart (2011)	Position
Australia (ARIA)	44
Canada (Canadian Hot 100)	72
Netherlands (Dutch Top 40)	22
Netherlands (Single Top 100)	78
US Billboard Hot 100	32
US Adult Top 40 (Billboard)	10
US Mainstream Top 40 (Billboard)	20

2012 year-end chart performance for "Tonight Tonight"
Chart (2012)	Position
Japan (Japan Hot 100)	64

== Certifications ==
Certifications and sales for "Tonight Tonight"
Region	Certification	Certified units/sales
Australia (ARIA)	3× Platinum	210,000^{^}
Canada (Music Canada)	Platinum	80,000^{*}
New Zealand (RMNZ)	2× Platinum	60,000^{‡}
Sweden (GLF)	Gold	20,000^{‡}
United Kingdom (BPI)	Silver	200,000^{‡}
United States (RIAA)	2× Platinum	2,000,000^{*}
^{*} Sales figures based on certification alone.^{^} Shipments figures based on certification alone.^{‡} Sales+streaming figures based on certification alone.

== Release history ==
Release dates for "Tonight Tonight"
Region	Date	Format	Version	Label	Ref.
Various	January 25, 2011	Digital download	Original	RCA	
United States	February 22, 2011	Contemporary hit radio	Original	RCA	
Various	March 15, 2011	Digital download	Extended play	RCA	
Various	September 2, 2011	Digital download	Remixes	RCA	

== See also ==
- List of Adult Top 40 number-one singles of 2011
