= Hot Chelle Rae =

American rock band

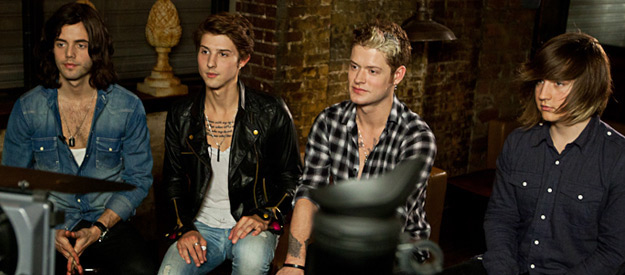
- The band in 2011: From left to right: Ian Keaggy, Ryan Follesé, Nash Overstreet, and Jamie Follesé.

Background information
- Also known as: Miracle Drug; HCR
- Origin: Nashville, Tennessee, U.S.
- Genres: Dance-rock; pop rock; alternative rock; pop; pop-punk (early)
- Years active: 2005–2014; 2018–present
- Labels: RCA, Jive
- Members: Nash Overstreet; Jamie Follesé
- Past members: Ian Keaggy; Ryan Follesé
- Website: hotchellerae.com

Hot Chelle Rae (/ˌhɒt ˌʃɛl ˈreɪ/ HOT SHEL RAY), formerly known as Miracle Drug, is an American pop rock band formed in Nashville, Tennessee in 2005. Their debut album, Lovesick Electric, was released on October 27, 2009. They gained widespread attention for their 2011 double platinum single, "Tonight Tonight". Another single, "I Like It Like That", peaked at No. 28 on the Billboard Hot 100 in the US.

== History ==
In 2005, Ryan Follesé and Nash Overstreet formed a band called Miracle Drug. Soon after they released their Masquerade EP, Ian Keaggy joined and the band's name was changed to Hot Chelle Rae. Ryan's younger brother Jamie joined in 2008, and they were subsequently signed to Jive Records. In October 2009, the band's debut album, Lovesick Electric, was released, with the band going on tour to support it throughout 2010 and 2011.

In 2011, the band released their single "Tonight Tonight", which hit the Billboard Top 10. Their second single "I Like It Like That" was released in November 2011 and featured a verse from the rapper duo New Boyz. They released their second studio album, Whatever on November 29, 2011. It reached number 48 on the US Billboard 200, 25 in Australia, and 21 in New Zealand. "Honestly" was released as the third and final single from the album in March 2012.

In March 2012, the band supported Taylor Swift on the Australian and New Zealand legs of her "Speak Now World Tour". In mid-2012, the band also toured with Demi Lovato. The band toured Australia and New Zealand through October to November with their "Whatever World Tour". British singer Cher Lloyd supported the band on this leg of the tour, along with Australian band 5 Seconds of Summer and New Zealand boyband Titanium. In November 2012, they released a cover of "Jingle Bell Rock" with some material added to it.

Hot Chelle Rae premiered a new single, "Hung Up" on January 25, 2013, and it was officially released on February 12, 2013. The band also announced that their new EP would be released in early 2014 along with a new single. On October 31, 2013, Ian Keaggy announced that he would no longer be a part of the band. That same day, Hot Chelle Rae released the unofficial version of "Recklessly" for their fans. On February 7, 2014, the band released a new single, "Don't Say Goodnight". Hot Chelle Rae continued to tour the US throughout the year. On October 1, 2014, Hot Chelle Rae released "Recklessly". The EP contained "Hung Up", "Don't Say Goodnight", "Recklessly", and two other singles. Ryan Follesé released "Put a Label on It" as a solo single in 2017.

In December 2018, the band announced live via Instagram that they were reforming and were planning a new album, and in November 2019, they released their first new song in five years: "I Hate LA".

On April 10, 2020, the band released their EP Tangerine, after four singles, "I Hate L.A.", "Tangerine", "Stay" and "Tomorrow Me".

== Musical style ==
Hot Chelle Rae's musical style has mainly been described as dance-rock, pop rock, alternative rock and pop.

== Band members ==
Current

- Nash Overstreet – lead guitar, vocals, bass, keyboards, synthesizer (2005–2014; 2019–present); lead vocals (2023–present)
- Jamie Follesé – drums, percussion (2008–2014; 2019–present)

Former

- Ryan Follesé – lead vocals, rhythm guitar, bass, keyboards, piano (2005–2014; 2019–2023)
- Ian Keaggy – bass guitar, backing vocals (2005–2013)

== Discography ==
=== As Miracle Drug ===
- Masquerade (c. 2005)

=== As Hot Chelle Rae ===
==== Albums ====
- Lovesick Electric (2009)
- Whatever (2011)

==== Extended plays ====
- Recklessly (2014)
- Tangerine (2020)

== Concert tours ==
- Whatever World Tour (October 2012)
