= Lil Wayne albums discography =

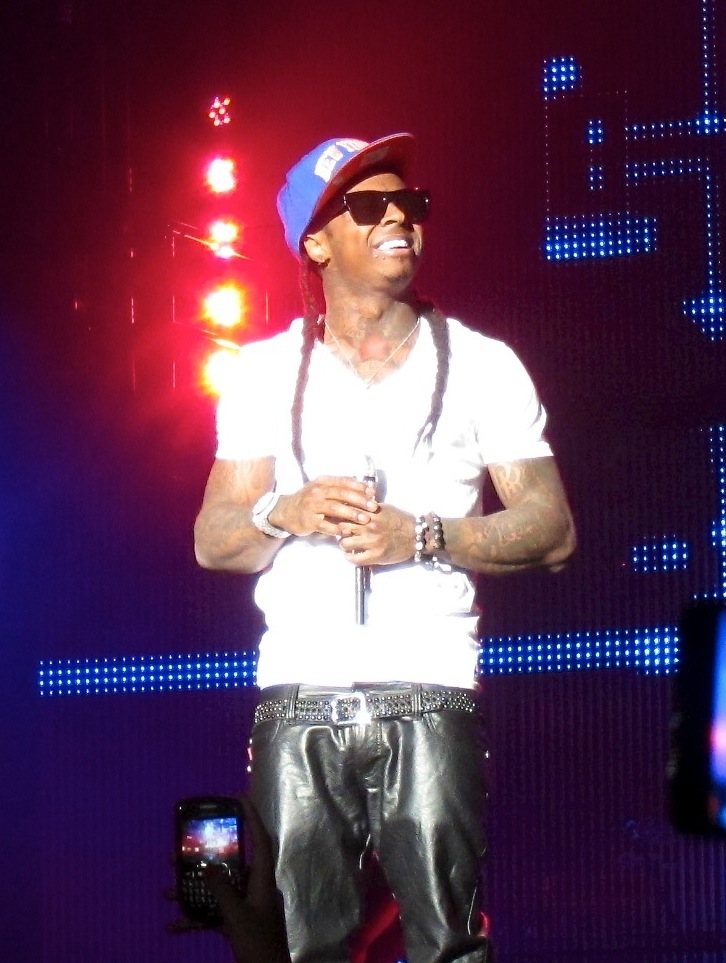
- Lil Wayne performing in New York City
- Studio albums: 14
- Extended plays: 5
- Compilation albums: 3
- Mixtapes: 29

American rapper Lil Wayne has released thirteen studio albums, one collaborative album, three compilation albums, five extended plays, and twenty-nine mixtapes. Wayne made his album debut in 1999, with Tha Block Is Hot, which was certified platinum by the Recording Industry Association of America. His later albums, Lights Out released in 2000, and 500 Degreez, released in 2002, attracted minor attention. In 2004, he released the first of his Tha Carter series, with Tha Carter. In 2005, Tha Carter II was released. In 2006, Wayne released a collaborative album with rapper Birdman, titled Like Father, Like Son. In 2008, Wayne released his best-selling album so far, titled Tha Carter III. Certified triple platinum by the RIAA, Tha Carter III won the Best Rap Album award at the 2009 Grammy Awards. Lil Wayne founded record label Young Money Entertainment and released a collaborative album featuring rappers signed to the label, We Are Young Money, in 2009, followed by his debut rock music album Rebirth in 2010. While serving an 8-month prison sentence in New York, he released another album entitled I Am Not a Human Being, in September 2010. The next addition to Tha Carter series, Tha Carter IV, was released on August 29, 2011. In 2013, Wayne released a sequel to his 2010 album I Am Not a Human Being, titled I Am Not a Human Being II, followed by two compilation albums with his labels, Rich Gang (2013), and Young Money: Rise of an Empire (2014). After years of legal battles, his 12th studio album Tha Carter V was released on September 28, 2018. Lil Wayne released another album, Funeral, on January 31, 2020.

His album sales in the United States stand at over 15 million copies as of July 2013, and his digital track sales stand at over 37 million digital copies.

== Studio albums ==
=== Solo albums ===
List of studio albums, with selected chart positions, sales figures and certifications
| Title | Album details | Peak chart positions | | | | | | | | | | Sales | Certifications |
| Title | Album details | US | US R&B/HH | US Rap | AUS | CAN | FRA | IRL | NZ | SWI | UK | Sales | Certifications |
|---|---|---|---|---|---|---|---|---|---|---|---|---|---|
| Tha Block Is Hot | Released: November 2, 1999; Label: Cash Money, Universal; Format: CD, LP, cassette, digital download, streaming | 3 | 1 | — | — | — | — | — | — | — | — | US: 1,402,000 | RIAA: Platinum |
| Lights Out | Released: December 19, 2000; Label: Cash Money, Universal; Format: CD, cassette, digital download, streaming | 16 | 2 | — | — | — | — | — | — | — | — | US: 1,000,000 | RIAA: Gold |
| 500 Degreez | Released: July 23, 2002; Label: Cash Money, Universal; Format: CD, LP, digital download, streaming | 6 | 1 | — | — | — | — | — | — | — | — | | RIAA: Gold |
| Tha Carter | Released: June 29, 2004; Label: Cash Money, Universal; Format: CD, LP, digital download, streaming | 5 | 2 | 1 | — | — | — | — | — | — | — | US: 878,000 | RIAA: Platinum |
| Tha Carter II | Released: December 6, 2005; Label: Cash Money, Young Money, Universal; Format: CD, LP, digital download, streaming | 2 | 1 | 1 | — | 26 | — | — | — | — | — | US: 1,400,000 | RIAA: 2× Platinum |
| Tha Carter III | Released: June 10, 2008; Label: Cash Money, Young Money, Universal Motown; Format: CD, LP, digital download, streaming | 1 | 1 | 1 | 47 | 1 | 25 | 34 | 10 | 17 | 23 | US: 3,800,000 | RIAA: 8× Platinum; BPI: Gold; MC: 2× Platinum; ARIA: Gold; RMNZ: 2× Platinum |
| Rebirth | Released: February 2, 2010; Label: Cash Money, Young Money, Universal Motown; Format: CD, digital download, streaming | 2 | 1 | 1 | 51 | 5 | 86 | 45 | 33 | 15 | 24 | US: 849,000 | RIAA: Platinum |
| I Am Not a Human Being | Released: September 27, 2010; Label: Cash Money, Young Money, Universal Motown; Format: CD, digital download, streaming | 1 | 1 | 1 | 60 | 4 | 167 | 84 | — | 46 | 56 | US: 1,000,000 | RIAA: 2× Platinum |
| Tha Carter IV | Released: August 29, 2011; Label: Cash Money, Young Money, Universal Republic; Format: CD, LP, digital download, streaming | 1 | 1 | 1 | 9 | 1 | 14 | 19 | 8 | 9 | 8 | US: 2,296,000; WW: 3,500,000 | RIAA: 5× Platinum; BPI: Gold; RMNZ: Platinum |
| I Am Not a Human Being II | Released: March 26, 2013; Label: Cash Money, Young Money, Republic; Format: CD, digital download, streaming | 2 | 2 | 1 | 43 | 5 | 24 | 85 | — | 35 | 29 | US: 529,000 | RIAA: 2× Platinum; MC: Gold; RMNZ: Gold |
| Free Weezy Album | Released: July 4, 2015; Label: Young Money, Republic; Format: Digital download, streaming | 77 | 45 | — | — | — | — | — | — | — | — | | |
| Tha Carter V | Released: September 28, 2018; Label: Young Money, Republic; Format: CD, LP, cassette, digital download, streaming | 1 | 1 | 1 | 6 | 1 | 49 | 5 | 3 | 12 | 5 | US: 140,000 (first week) | RIAA: 2× Platinum; BPI: Silver; RMNZ: Gold |
| Funeral | Released: January 31, 2020; Label: Young Money, Republic; Format: CD, LP, digital download, streaming | 1 | 1 | 1 | 68 | 5 | 110 | 73 | — | 29 | 61 | US: 38,000 (first week) | |
| Tha Carter VI | Released: June 6, 2025; Label: Young Money, Republic; Format: CD, LP, digital download, streaming | 2 | 1 | 1 | — | 14 | — | — | 31 | 39 | 77 | | |
"—" denotes a recording that did not chart or was not released in that territory.

=== Collaborative albums ===
List of studio albums, with selected chart positions, sales figures and certifications
| Title | Album details | Peak chart positions | | | | | | | | | | Sales | Certifications |
| Title | Album details | US | US R&B/HH | US Rap | AUS | CAN | FRA | IRL | NZ | SWI | UK | Sales | Certifications |
|---|---|---|---|---|---|---|---|---|---|---|---|---|---|
| Like Father, Like Son (with Birdman) | Released: October 31, 2006; Label: Cash Money, Universal; Format: CD, LP, digital download, streaming | 3 | 1 | 1 | — | — | — | — | — | — | — | | RIAA: Gold |
| Welcome 2 Collegrove (with 2 Chainz) | Released: November 17, 2023; Label: Def Jam, Gamebread; Format: CD, LP, digital download, streaming | 20 | 4 | 1 | — | 84 | — | — | — | — | 96 | | |
"—" denotes a recording that did not chart or was not released in that territory.

== Compilation albums ==
List of compilation albums, with selected chart positions and certifications
| Title | Album details | Peak chart positions | | | | Certifications |
| Title | Album details | US | US R&B/HH | US Rap | CAN | Certifications |
|---|---|---|---|---|---|---|
| I Am Music | Released: March 31, 2023; Label: Young Money, Republic; Format: Digital download, streaming | 25 | 9 | 6 | 64 | BPI: Silver |

== Extended plays ==
List of extended plays
| Title | EP details |
|---|---|
| The Leak | Released: December 25, 2007; Label: Cash Money; Format: Digital download, streaming |
| In Tune We Trust | Released: July 5, 2017; Label: Young Money; Format: Digital download, streaming |
| Weezy Workout | Released: June 17, 2020; Label: Young Money; Format: Digital download, streaming |
| Weezy Flow | Released: June 24, 2020; Label: Young Money; Format: Digital download, streaming |
| Skateboard Weezy | Released: July 1, 2020; Label: Young Money; Format: Digital download, streaming |

== Mixtapes ==
List of mixtapes, with selected chart positions
| Title | Mixtape details | Peak chart positions | | | |
| Title | Mixtape details | US | US Ind. | US R&B/HH | US Rap |
|---|---|---|---|---|---|
| SQ1 (with Sqad Up) | Released: 2002; Format: Digital download | — | — | — | — |
| SQ2 (with Sqad Up) | Released: 2002; Format: Digital download | — | — | — | — |
| SQ3 (with Sqad Up) | Released: 2002; Format: Digital download | — | — | — | — |
| SQ4 (with Sqad Up) | Released: 2002; Format: Digital download | — | — | — | — |
| SQ5 (with Sqad Up) | Released: 2003; Format: Digital download | — | — | — | — |
| SQ6 (with Sqad Up) | Released: 2003; Format: Digital download | — | — | — | — |
| SQ6: Tha Remix (with Sqad Up) | Released: 2003; Format: Digital download | — | — | — | — |
| SQ7 (10,000 Bars) (with Sqad Up) | Released: 2003; Format: Digital download | — | — | — | — |
| Da Drought | Released: 2003; Label: Cash Money; Format: Digital download | — | — | — | — |
| Da Drought 2 | Released: 2004; Label: Cash Money; Format: Digital download | — | — | — | — |
| The Prefix | Released: February 2004; Label: Cash Money; Format: Digital download | — | — | — | — |
| Young Money: The Mixtape Vol. 1 (with Young Money) | Released: October 6, 2005; Label: Young Money; Format: Digital download | — | — | — | — |
| The Suffix | Released: November 20, 2005; Label: Cash Money; Format: Digital download | — | — | — | — |
| The Dedication | Released: December 13, 2005; Label: On the Low; Format: Digital download | — | — | 93 | — |
| Dedication 2 | Released: September 4, 2006; Label: BCD; Format: Digital download | — | 30 | 85 | — |
| Da Drought 3 | Released: May 11, 2007; Label: Young Money; Format: Digital download | — | — | — | — |
| Dedication 3 | Released: December 16, 2008; Label: Aphilliates; Format: Digital download | 111 | 12 | 28 | 9 |
| No Ceilings | Released: October 31, 2009; Label: Cash Money, Young Money; Format: Digital download | 18 | — | 11 | 11 |
| Sorry 4 the Wait | Released: July 13, 2011; Label: Cash Money, Young Money; Format: Digital download | 60 | — | 31 | — |
| Dedication 4 | Released: September 3, 2012; Label: Young Money, Aphilliates; Format: Digital download | — | — | 56 | — |
| Dedication 5 | Released: September 1, 2013; Label: Young Money; Format: Digital download | — | — | — | — |
| Sorry 4 the Wait 2 | Released: January 20, 2015; Label: Young Money; Format: Digital download | — | 49 | 47 | — |
| No Ceilings 2 | Released: November 26, 2015; Label: Young Money; Format: Digital download | — | — | — | — |
| T-Wayne (with T-Pain) | Released: May 18, 2017; Label: Nappy Boy; Format: Digital download | — | — | — | — |
| Dedication 6 | Released: December 25, 2017; Label: Young Money; Format: Digital download | — | — | — | — |
| Dedication 6: Reloaded | Released: January 26, 2018; Label: Young Money; Format: Digital download | — | — | — | — |
| No Ceilings 3 | Released: November 27, 2020; Label: Young Money; Format: Digital download | — | — | — | — |
| Trust Fund Babies (with Rich the Kid) | Released: October 1, 2021; Label: Young Money, Rostrum, Republic; Format: CD, digital download | 35 | — | 19 | 17 |
| Tha Fix Before tha VI | Released: September 29, 2023; Label: Young Money, Republic; Format: Digital download | 40 | — | 13 | 11 |
