= SQ3 =

SQ3 may refer to:

- SQ3, a galactic quadrant in the Milky Way
- SQ3, mixtape by Lil Wayne
- Space Quest III, a video game
- Microsoft SQ3, a system on a chip
