= SQ5 =

SQ5 may refer to:

- SQ5, mixtape by Lil Wayne
- Space Quest V, a video game
