= Way of Life (Lil Wayne song) =

Single by Lil Wayne featuring Big Tymers and TQ

from the album 500 Degreez
- Released: May 3, 2002
- Genre: Hip hop
- Length: 4:01
- Label: Cash Money; Universal
- Songwriters: Franne Golde; Dennis Lambert; Duane Hitchings; Lil Wayne; Mannie Fresh; TQ
- Producer: Mannie Fresh

Lil Wayne singles chronology
"Shine" (2001)	"Way of Life" (2002)	"Neva Get Enuf" (2002)

Music video
- "Lil Wayne - Way Of Life (Official Music Video) ft. Big Tymers, TQ" on YouTube

"Way of Life" is the only single by rapper Lil Wayne from his album 500 Degreez. It features Big Tymers and TQ. The song samples "Don't Look Any Further" by Dennis Edwards featuring Siedah Garrett.

"Way of Life" references "Paid in Full" ("Paid in Full" also samples "Don't Look Any Further") with Mannie Fresh saying at the end "What happened to peace? Peace."

== Credits ==
Name	Credits
Leslie Braithwaite	Mixing
Dino Delvaille	A&R
Steve Fisher	Mixing Assistant
Mannie Fresh	Producer
Aaron Harris	Engineer
Adrienne Muhammed	A&R
Bryan Williams	Executive Producer
Ronald Williams	Executive Producer
Mike "Hitman" Wilson	Engineer

== Formats and track listings ==
12" Vinyl

1. A1. "Way of Life" (Main)
2. A2. "Way of Life" (Clean)
3. B1. "Way of Life" (Instr.)
4. B2. "Way of Life" (TV track)

== Charts ==
Chart (2002)	Peak position
US Billboard Hot 100	71
US Hot R&B/Hip-Hop Songs (Billboard)	23
US Hot Rap Songs (Billboard)	26
US Rhythmic Airplay (Billboard)	27
