= SQ4 =

SQ4 may refer to:

- SQ4, a galactic quadrant in the Milky Way
- SQ4, a mixtape by Lil Wayne
- Space Quest IV, an adventure game by Sierra Entertainment
