= Dedication 5 =

Mixtape by Lil Wayne
- Released: September 1, 2013
- Recorded: 2013
- Genre: Hip-hop
- Length: 98:34
- Labels: Young Money, Aphilliates Music Group
- Compiler: DJ Drama

Lil Wayne chronology
I Am Not a Human Being II (2013)	Dedication 5 (2013)	Sorry 4 the Wait 2 (2015)

Dedication 5 is the twelfth mixtape by American rapper Lil Wayne. It was hosted by DJ Drama and was released on September 1, 2013. It is the fifth installment of Lil Wayne's "Dedication" series, following its predecessors The Dedication, Dedication 2, Dedication 3 and Dedication 4. It's also the fifth installment of Lil Wayne's "Gangsta Grillz" series. The mixtape features guest appearances from the Weeknd, Chance the Rapper, Jae Millz, Future, Birdman, Mack Maine, T.I., Vado and Kidd Kidd among others.

== Background ==
On June 10, 2013 Lil Wayne released a freestyle over Ace Hood's hit "Bugatti" instrumental featuring fellow Young Money artist Boo, which was later confirmed to be the first song from Dedication 5. Later that day DJ Drama confirmed on his Twitter that the mixtape is coming by stating: "Yup. D5. Tunechi. Dram. YM. Stay tuned. But pleaaaase.... b patient." hinting that the mixtape was still in development. Mack Maine intensified the topic when he tweeted D5 hinting the tape would be soon released. On August 14, 2013, Lil Wayne hinted on his Twitter account that the mixtape would be finished in 10 days after he was asked by a fan. On August 25, 2013, it was announced the mixtape would be released on August 30, 2013. The mixtape was later pushed back two days and was released on September 1, 2013, at 12AM PST. The graphic artwork of Dedication 5 was made by the graphics team OllyCarterzGFX (Olly Tas and Abidul Ahad).

== Critical reception ==
Professional ratings
Review scores
Source	Rating
Consequence of Sound	3.5/5 stars
Pitchfork	5.1/10
PopMatters	6/10
XXL	(L)

Dedication 5 was met with mixed reviews from music critics. William E. Ketchum III of HipHopDX gave the mixtape a positive review, saying "To Wayne's credit, Dedication 5 is the best the series has showcased since its legendary sequel from seven years ago, even if it pales in comparison. Occasionally, the YMCMB head honcho shows that he still has a portion of the skills that earned him his spot among rap's elite. If he can find recapture the consistency from that same era, he won't have to apologize to his fans for much longer." Brian Josephs of XXL gave the mixtape an L, saying "Surprisingly, one of the more intriguing moments of Dedication 5 comes in a skit. On one of the final tracks, Lil Wayne is asked if he considers himself a living legend. He doesn't know, but he concludes by saying being Lil Wayne is "amazing." Is this just contentment or a positive outlook on things to come, like the entertaining, but flawed Dedication 5 is? Fans could speculate, but it's much easier to realize how refreshing it is to hear Lil Wayne sounding like he gives a damn." Corban Goble of Pitchfork gave the mixtape a 5.1 out of 10, saying "Though he's still got an ear for the beat and can manipulate his flow to fit-- and, again, most of these bars are rapped without rehearsal, so adjust your mindset accordingly-- Dedication 5 is uneven, front-heavy, and too long for one sitting. But with both recent mixtapes as well as recent projects, Wayne has set the bar very low. What more can he say? It's hard to know until the artist himself decides, but Dedication 5-- a release whose DatPiff page earnestly reads "Welcome back Mixtape Weezy”—shows that some gears are still moving."

Chris Coplan of Consequence of Sound gave the album three and a half stars out of five, saying "In just a few words, Wayne lends all sorts of gravity to claims that he wants to get better and to do away with the laziness, fear, and negativity of recent years. He's got a long way to go before he's ever the Best In The World again, but he's nothing if not totally, totally… committed. Good to have ya back, Mr. Carter." Adam Finley of PopMatters gave the mixtape a six out of ten, saying "Medical troubles, legal troubles, self-doubt, the crushing weight of expectation – any one of those on its own could cripple an artist. Wayne has stumbled hard in recent years, but with Dedication 5 he seems to have temporarily caught himself. He even apologized to fans on Twitter recently and promised to work harder. Dedication 5 is not the best Lil Wayne mixtape ever. It's not even in the Top 5, but it is the best that he's released in four years. More importantly, it's evidence that Mixtape Weezy still exists in some form, if Wayne can stop cashing checks and doing skateboard tricks long enough to let him out."

On December 23, 2013, XXL ranked it at number 16 on their list of the best mixtapes of 2013.

== Track listing ==
No.	Title	Producer / Original Song (Artist)	Length
1.	"I'm Good" (featuring The Weeknd)	Focus187 & Dj Drama	2:07
2.	"How Dedicated (Interlude)"		0:52
3.	"Don't Kill"	"Bitch, Don't Kill My Vibe" (Kendrick Lamar)	4:20
4.	"New Slaves"	"New Slaves" (Kanye West)	2:54
5.	"Drama & Weezy (Interlude)"		0:15
6.	"Typa Way" (featuring T.I.)	"Type of Way" (Rich Homie Quan)	5:15
7.	"You Song" (featuring Chance the Rapper)		5:32
8.	"Ain't Worried" (performed by Euro and Jae Millz)	"Ain't Worried About Nothin'" (French Montana)	2:33
9.	"Before Tune Gets Back (Produced by, YLX)" (performed by Lil Chuckee)		3:25
10.	"Started"	"Started from the Bottom" (Drake)	3:01
11.	"New Signees to Young Money? (Interlude)"		1:39
12.	"Live Life" (featuring Euro and T@)	StreetRunner & Matthew Burnett	4:08
13.	"Itchin'"	"Itchin'" (DJ Infamous featuring Future)	3:33
14.	"Way I'm Ballin'" (featuring Future, Mack Maine, and Birdman)		3:53
15.	"Fortune Teller (Interlude)"		1:01
16.	"Thinkin' About You"	David Banner	3:22
17.	"Pure Colombia"	"Colombia" (Young Scooter)	3:39
18.	"Bugatti" (featuring Boo)	"Bugatti" (Ace Hood featuring Future & Rick Ross)	3:26
19.	"Still Got That Rock"	Drumma Boy	3:24
20.	"Competition (Interlude)"		0:21
21.	"FuckWitMeYouKnowIGotIt" (featuring T.I.)	"FuckWithMeYouKnowIGotIt" (Jay-Z featuring Rick Ross)	3:45
22.	"UOENO"	"U.O.E.N.O." (Rocko featuring Future & Rick Ross)	3:49
23.	"Levels" (featuring Vado)	"Levels" (Meek Mill)	3:44
24.	"Living Legend (Interlude)"		0:47
25.	"Cream" (featuring Euro)	"C.R.E.A.M." (Wu-Tang Clan)	3:28
26.	"Devastation" (featuring Gudda Gudda)	Mike Banger	3:20
27.	"Fuckin' Problems" (featuring Euro and Kidd Kidd)	"Fuckin' Problems" (ASAP Rocky featuring Drake, 2 Chainz & Kendrick Lamar)	4:22
28.	"Feds Watching" (Remix) (2 Chainz featuring Lil Wayne & T.I.)	"Feds Watching" (2 Chainz featuring Pharrell Williams)	5:26
29.	"Luv"		8:29
