= 500 Degreez =

Studio album by Lil Wayne
- Released: July 23, 2002
- Recorded: 2001–2002
- Studio: PatchWerk (Atlanta, GA); Sony Studios (New York)
- Genre: Southern hip hop; gangsta rap
- Length: 1:10:22
- Label: Cash Money; Universal
- Producer: Mannie Fresh; Jazze Pha

Lil Wayne chronology
Lights Out (2000)	500 Degreez (2002)	Tha Carter (2004)

Singles from 500 Degreez
- 1. "Way of Life" Released: May 3, 2002; 2. "Where You At" Released: August 15, 2002

500 Degreez is the third solo studio album by American rapper Lil Wayne. It was released on July 23, 2002, through Cash Money Records and Universal Records. The album was titled in continuation of the naming sequence of successful 1998's 400 Degreez album by fellow Hot Boys rapper and ex-labelmate Juvenile.

The recording sessions took place at PatchWerk Recording Studios in Atlanta and Sony Studios in New York. The album was produced by Cash Money in-house producer Mannie Fresh, except for two tracks that were produced by Jazze Pha. It features guest appearances from Big Tymers, TQ, Blaque, Cristale, Petey Pablo, and Tateeze, with cameos from Big Tigger and Rob Nice.

Along with the singles, music videos were released for "Way of Life" and "Where You At".

== Background ==
A year before the release of his third solo project, Lil' Wayne remained the only member of the Hot Boys quartet under the Cash Money Records, as his companions Turk, B.G. and Juvenile all left the group and the label due to financial disagreements. After the departure of the Cash Money's top-selling artist at that time, Juvenile, Wayne suggested to the head of the label and, concurrently, his mentor, Birdman, that he call his upcoming solo album 500 Degreez as a nod to Juve's 400 Degreez, which by December 19, 2000, had already been sold four million copies. "It was a rebellion album, we was supposed to show that Juvie was gone and we were still here", said Lil' Wayne in an interview with Wild Wayne of New Orleans radio station Q93 in 2015, "When we did it, we had no problem saying, 'Yeah, we don't need no Juvie. This is 500 Degreez'". Juvenile, in turn, threatened to release 600 Degrees, but the project never materialised. However, Juvenile's manager Aubrey Francis and Birdman met and negotiated a deal for Juvenile to release one further solo album for Cash Money. Thus, in 2003, Juve the Great was released omitting Wayne's participation in it.

A roughly similar situation arose while waiting for the release of Lil' Wayne's Tha Carter V, when rapper Young Thug at the end of 2014 announced his plans to release a series of projects entitled Carter from IV to X as an homage to Wayne. Subsequently, due to delays of Tha Carter V release, a feud with Young Thug (since he nevertheless released his mixtape, but under the name Barter 6, wherein Birdman appeared on two tracks), contractual disputes with the label, personal disputes with Birdman, a lengthy legal battle, Lil' Wayne have been finally released from his Cash Money Records contract in June 2018.

== Critical reception ==
Professional ratings
Review scores
Source	Rating
AllMusic	4/5 stars
HipHopDX	3/5
RapReviews	6/10
The New Rolling Stone Album Guide	3.5/5 stars
USA Today	2/4 stars
XXL	2/5 (M)

500 Degreez received average reviews from music critics.

Together with Mannie Fresh's "smooth, laid-back production" and "top-flight beats", AllMusic's John Bush also praised "Wayne's drawling delivery" and Petey Pablo's guest spot on the album. Brett Berliner of Stylus Magazine highlighted the album's lead single "Way of Life" for its "trademark southern flair". Sam Chennault of Rhapsody stated that the album "has a score of killer hooks and infectious Dirty South beats" and found "Fresh's adlibs are among the funniest in all the business and are comic foil to Wayne's party anthems".

In mixed reviews, DeMarco Williams of HipHopDX called it "just another average Cash Money Records release". Steve 'Flash' Juon of RapReviews resumed: "the only hot thing about 500 Degreez is the Fresh beats found within". Steve Jones of USA Today wrote: "Wayne covers too much of the same bling-bling and gangsta territory that has been trodden so many times before. The same goes for the fast-forward-fodder skits, which add length but not depth". Keith Harris of The Village Voice wrote: "on 500 Degreez, Wayne's clipped, slightly nasal chatter shares heartfelt but commonplace observations about the street hustle atop standard-issue Mannie Fresh bump-and-twitch", adding that "Wayne's between-track ad libs are more entertaining than his actual rhymes".

== Commercial performance ==
The album debuted at number six on the Billboard 200 and atop the Top R&B/Hip-Hop Albums charts in the United States, with 141,000 copies sold in the first week. 500 Degreez marks Wayne's second US top-ten debut as well as his second number-one R&B album, following 1999's Tha Block Is Hot. As of September 3, 2002, the album was certified gold by the Recording Industry Association of America for sales of over 500,000 copies in the United States alone.

Its lead single, "Way of Life", peaked at number 71 on the US Billboard Hot 100, number 23 on the Hot R&B/Hip-Hop Songs, number 26 on the Hot Rap Songs and number 27 on the Rhythmic charts.

== Track listing ==
No.	Title	Writer(s)	Producer(s)	Length
1.	"Fly Talkin'"	Bryan Williams; Byron Thomas	Mannie Fresh	1:35
2.	"Look at Me"	Dwayne Carter; Williams; Thomas	Mannie Fresh	4:00
3.	"Way of Life" (featuring Big Tymers and TQ)	Carter; Thomas; Terrence Quaites; Francine Vicki Golde; Dennis Lambert; Duane Hitchings	Mannie Fresh	3:59
4.	"Big Tigger Live on the Radio"	Darian Morgan; Thomas	Mannie Fresh	1:31
5.	"Gangsta and Pimps" (featuring Baby)	Williams; Thomas; G. Green	Mannie Fresh	4:41
6.	"Lovely"	Carter; Thomas	Mannie Fresh	4:02
7.	"Gangsta Shit" (featuring Petey Pablo)	Carter; Moses Barrett III; Thomas	Mannie Fresh	3:40
8.	"Big Tigger Live on the Radio"	Morgan; Thomas	Mannie Fresh	0:58
9.	"Bloodline"	Carter; Thomas	Mannie Fresh	4:21
10.	"Where You At"	Carter; Thomas	Mannie Fresh	3:50
11.	"Worry Me"	Carter; Thomas	Mannie Fresh	4:06
12.	"500 Degreez"	Carter; Thomas	Mannie Fresh	3:45
13.	"Go Hard"	Carter; Thomas	Mannie Fresh	3:30
14.	"Young'n Blues"	Carter; Thomas	Mannie Fresh	4:32
15.	"Believe That" (featuring Blaque and Mannie Fresh)	Carter; Thomas; Phalon Alexander	Jazze Pha	4:12
16.	"Rob Nice Live on the Radio"	Rob Nice; Thomas	Mannie Fresh	1:13
17.	"Fuck You" (featuring Big Tymers)	Carter; Thomas; Williams	Mannie Fresh	4:20
18.	"What Does Life Mean to Me" (featuring TQ and Big Tymers)	Carter; Quaites; Thomas; Williams	Mannie Fresh	1:25
19.	"Get That Dough" (featuring Baby, Tateeze and Cristale)	Carter; Williams; Alexander	Jazze Pha	3:38
20.	"Fo Sheezy"	Carter; Thomas	Mannie Fresh	3:44
21.	"Fly Talkin' Go Home"	Williams; Thomas	Mannie Fresh	3:20
Total length:				1:10:22

Sample credits

- Track 3 contains elements from "Don't Look Any Further" written by Francine Vicki Golde, Dennis Lambert and Duane Hitchings and performed by Dennis Edwards.

== Personnel ==
- Dwayne "Lil' Wayne" Carter – vocals
- Bryan "Baby" Williams – vocals, executive producer
- Byron "Mannie Fresh" Thomas – vocals, producer
- Terrance "TQ" Quaites – vocals (tracks: 3, 18)
- Darian "Big Tigger" Morgan – vocals (tracks: 4, 8)
- Moses "Petey Pablo" Barrett III – vocals (track 7)
- Blaque – vocals (track 15)
- Rob Nice – vocals (track 16)
- Marinna "Tateeze" Teal – vocals (track 19)
- Cristale – vocals (track 19)
- Phalon "Jazze Pha" Alexander – producer (tracks: 15, 19)
- Mark Goodchild – recording (tracks: 1, 4, 6–12, 15–19, 21), mixing (tracks: 1, 4, 8, 16, 18, 21)
- Mike Wilson – recording (tracks: 2, 3, 5, 11, 13, 14, 17, 19, 20)
- Steve Fisher – recording (tracks: 7, 9, 10, 20), mixing assistant (tracks: 2, 3, 5–7, 9–14, 17)
- Leslie Brathwaite – mixing (tracks: 2, 3, 5–7, 9–15, 17, 19, 20)
- Greg Stewart – engineering assistant (tracks: 1, 4, 8, 15, 16, 18–21)
- Cory Williams – engineering assistant (track 15), mixing assistant (tracks: 7, 9, 10, 20)
- Ismel "Nino" Ramos – engineering assistant (track 17), mixing assistant (tracks: 2, 5, 7, 9)
- Aaron Harris – mixing assistant (track 3)
- Chris Gehringer – mastering
- Ronald "Slim" Williams – executive producer
- Adrienne Muhammad – A&R
- Dino Delvaille – A&R

== Charts ==
=== Weekly charts ===
Chart (2002)	Peak position
US Billboard 200	6
US Top R&B/Hip-Hop Albums (Billboard)	1

=== Year-end charts ===
Chart (2002)	Position
US Billboard 200	198
US Top R&B/Hip-Hop Albums (Billboard)	63

== Certifications ==
Region	Certification	Certified units/sales
United States (RIAA)	Gold	500,000^{^}
^{^} Shipments figures based on certification alone.
