= Go D.J. =

Single by Lil Wayne

from the album Tha Carter
- Released: October 5, 2004
- Genre: Hip hop
- Length: 4:41
- Label: Cash Money; Universal
- Songwriters: Lil Wayne; Mannie Fresh
- Producer: Mannie Fresh

Lil Wayne singles chronology
"Bring It Back" (2004)	"Go D.J." (2004)	"Earthquake" (2004)

Music video
- "Go DJ" on YouTube

"Go D.J." is the second single from Lil Wayne's fourth studio album, Tha Carter. The song's instrumental was produced by DJ Mannie Fresh, who also provides vocals on the song.

The lyrics to the song are both written and performed by Lil Wayne. The single became Lil Wayne's first solo hit, reaching the top three on the US Rap Chart and becoming a top 20 single. It was Lil Wayne's most successful single as a lead artist until "Lollipop" reached number one in 2008.

The song's chorus is borrowed from an earlier song of the same title by New Orleans rap group U.N.L.V. It is also featured in the racing game Midnight Club 3: Dub Edition and its remix version.

== Music video ==
The video is set in a prison (the Mansfield Reformatory, where The Shawshank Redemption was shot) and begins with Mannie Fresh attacking a prison guard in his office, which leads to Lil Wayne being freed from an electric chair, which leads to a riot in the prison. Wayne is then shown in numerous different areas, including the cafeteria, his cell and the prison yard, where he is watching a boxing match in a crowd of people. Lil Wayne spends much of the video surrounded by female correctional officers, who serve him food, follow him around and lead him into the showers. The video ends with Lil Wayne being released from prison. It features cameo appearances from Birdman, Ronald 'Slim' Williams, Mannie Fresh, Gillie Da Kid, and C-Murder.

== Charts ==
=== Weekly charts ===
Chart (2004)	Peak position
US Billboard Hot 100	14
US Hot R&B/Hip-Hop Songs (Billboard)	4
US Hot Rap Songs (Billboard)	3
US Rhythmic Airplay (Billboard)	19

=== Year-end charts ===
Chart (2004)	Position
US Hot R&B/Hip-Hop Songs (Billboard)	59
Chart (2005)	Position
US Hot R&B/Hip-Hop Songs (Billboard)	67

== Certifications ==
Region	Certification	Certified units/sales
United States (RIAA)	2× Platinum	2,000,000^{‡}
^{‡} Sales+streaming figures based on certification alone.

== Release history ==
Region	Date	Format(s)	Label(s)	Ref.
United States	September 14, 2004	Rhythmic contemporary · urban contemporary radio	Cash Money, Universal	
