= Tha Block Is Hot (song) =

1999 debut single by Lil' Wayne

Single by Lil Wayne featuring Juvenile and B.G.

from the album Tha Block Is Hot
- Released: October 23, 1999
- Recorded: 1999
- Studio: Cash Money Studios (Metairie, LA)
- Genre: Southern hip-hop
- Length: 4:13
- Label: Cash Money
- Songwriters: Dwayne Carter; Terius Gray; Christopher Dorsey; Byron Thomas
- Producers: Ronald "Slim" Williams (exec.); Baby (exec.); Mannie Fresh

Lil Wayne singles chronology
"Back That Azz Up" (1999)	"Tha Block Is Hot" (1999)	"Number One Stunna" (2000)

Juvenile singles chronology
"Follow Me Now" (1999)	"Tha Block Is Hot" (1999)	"U Understand" (1999)

Music video
- "Tha Block Is Hot" on YouTube

"Tha Block Is Hot" is the debut single by American rapper Lil Wayne, and features fellow American rappers B.G. and Juvenile. It was released on October 23, 1999 via Cash Money Records as the lead single from the former's debut solo studio album of the same name (1999). Recording sessions took place at Cash Money Studios in Metairie, Louisiana. Production was handled by Mannie Fresh with executive producers Ronald "Slim" Williams and Birdman.

The song peaked at number 72 on the Billboard Hot 100, at number 24 on the Hot R&B/Hip-Hop Songs and at number 27 on the Hot Rap Songs. It was named the 50th greatest hip-hop song of all time by VH1 in 2008.

In the Dave Meyers-directed music video, Lil Wayne is getting chased by cops and successfully evades them as well as a police helicopter.

== Live performances ==
In 2000, Lil Wayne performed the song on The Jenny Jones Show.

== Track listing ==
12″ single
No.	Title	Length
1.	"Tha Block Is Hot" (Dirty)	4:13
2.	"Tha Block Is Hot" (Radio)	4:13
3.	"Tha Block Is Hot" (Instrumental)	4:13
4.	"Tha Block Is Hot" (Squeaky Clean Radio)	4:13

== Personnel ==
- Dwayne Carter – main artist, vocals
- Terius Gray – featured artist, vocals
- Christopher Dorsey – featured artist, vocals
- Byron Thomas – engineering, mixing, producer
- James Cruz – mastering
- Ronald "Slim" Williams – executive producer
- Bryan Williams – executive producer
- Dino Delvaille – A&R

== Charts ==
Chart (1999–2000)	Peak position
US Billboard Hot 100	72
US Hot R&B/Hip-Hop Songs (Billboard)	24
US Hot Rap Songs (Billboard)	27
