= Gone 'Til November =

Prison memoir by Lil Wayne

Gone 'Til November: A Journal of Rikers Island
- Author: Dwayne Michael Carter Jr. (Lil Wayne)
- Language: English
- Genre: Memoir
- Published: October 11, 2016
- Publisher: Plume Books
- Publication place: United States
- ISBN: 978-1-911274-69-8

Gone 'Til November: A Journal of Rikers Island is a prison memoir from the diary of the American rapper Lil Wayne. It was initially published on October 11, 2016, via Plume Books, a subdivision of Penguin Books. The book describes Wayne's experience on New York prison Rikers Island, where he was incarcerated for eight months in 2010. The book details, among other things, how Wayne served as a suicide prevention aide as well as how he attempted to commit suicide himself.

== Reception ==
Upon release, Gone 'Til November received mostly positive reviews by critics with Rolling Stone naming it a 2016 "must-read". However some, like the LA Times, criticized the book for a lack of discussion of serious issues faced by the majority of inmates in prison.
