= Lights Out (Lil Wayne album) =

Studio album by Lil Wayne
- Released: December 19, 2000
- Recorded: 1999–2000
- Genre: Southern hip-hop
- Length: 75:35
- Labels: Cash Money; Universal
- Producer: Mannie Fresh

Lil Wayne chronology
Tha Block Is Hot (1999)	Lights Out (2000)	500 Degreez (2002)

Singles from Lights Out
- 1. "Get Off the Corner" Released: December 19, 2000; 2. "Everything" Released: March 13, 2001; 3. "Shine" Released: July 17, 2001

Professional ratings
Review scores
Source	Rating
AllMusic	3/5 stars
The A.V. Club	(positive)
RapReviews	6/10
Rolling Stone	3.5/5 stars
USA Today	3/4 stars
Vibe	3.5/5 stars

Lights Out is the second studio album by American rapper Lil Wayne. It was released on December 19, 2000, by Cash Money Records and Universal Records. The album peaked at number 16 on the US Billboard 200 chart. The album was certified gold by the Recording Industry Association of America (RIAA).

== Commercial performance ==
Lights Out debuted at number 24 on the US Billboard 200 chart, during the week of January 6, 2001. The album also debuted at number two on the US Top R&B/Hip-Hop Albums chart, becoming Wayne's second top-ten album on that chart. It moved 205,000 units in its debut week. In its second week, the album reached its peak position at number 16 on the chart dated January 13, 2001. As of June 21, 2001, the album was certified gold by the Recording Industry Association of America (RIAA) for sales of over 500,000 copies in the United States. As of May 2013, the album has sold approximately a million copies in the United States.

== Track listing ==
All songs produced by Mannie Fresh.

No.	Title	Length
1.	"Intro (Watch Them People)"	0:34
2.	"Get Off the Corner"	4:45
3.	"On the Grind"	3:52
4.	"Hit U Up" (featuring Hot Boys)	5:11
5.	"Everything"	4:42
6.	"Fuck wit Me Now"	3:49
7.	"Lil One" (featuring Big Tymers)	3:12
8.	"Break Me Off" (featuring Big Tymers and Unplugged)	4:25
9.	"Skit"	0:42
10.	"Wish You Would"	4:14
11.	"Grown Man"	4:34
12.	"Shine" (featuring Hot Boys)	5:04
13.	"Jump Jiggy"	4:13
14.	"Realized"	4:00
15.	"Tha Blues"	4:34
16.	"Let's Go" (featuring Big Tymers)	4:08
17.	"Biznite"	4:23
18.	"Act a Ass" (featuring B.G.)	4:44
19.	"Beef"	4:24
Total length:		75:35

=== Personnel ===
- Pen & Pixel - Cover art

== Charts ==
=== Weekly charts ===
Chart (2000)	Peak position
US Billboard 200	16
US Top R&B/Hip-Hop Albums (Billboard)	2

=== Year-end charts ===
Chart (2001)	Position
US Billboard 200	132
US Top R&B/Hip-Hop Albums (Billboard)	43

== Certifications ==
Region	Certification	Certified units/sales
United States (RIAA)	Gold	500,000^{^}
^{^} Shipments figures based on certification alone.
