= Tha Carter =

Studio album by Lil Wayne
- Released: June 29, 2004
- Recorded: 2003–2004
- Genres: Southern hip-hop; bounce; gangsta rap
- Length: 79:07
- Labels: Cash Money; Universal
- Producers: Mannie Fresh; Lil Wayne; Raj Smoove; Leslie Brathwaite; Jazze Pha

Lil Wayne chronology
500 Degreez (2002)	Tha Carter (2004)	The Dedication (2005)

Tha Carter albums chronology
Tha Carter (2004)	Tha Carter II (2005)

Singles from Tha Carter
- 1. "Bring It Back" Released: April 17, 2004; 2. "Go D.J." Released: October 5, 2004; 3. "Earthquake" Released: March 27, 2005

Tha Carter is the fourth studio album by American rapper Lil Wayne. It was released on June 29, 2004, by Cash Money Records and Universal Records. The album was produced primarily by Cash Money's former in-house producer Mannie Fresh, before Mannie left the label. A chopped and screwed version of the album was also released in 2004. The album spawned five sequels: Tha Carter II, Tha Carter III, Tha Carter IV, Tha Carter V, and Tha Carter VI. The album debuted at number five on the US Billboard 200 chart and received favorable reviews from critics, selling 116,000 copies in its first week. "Go D.J." became Wayne's first mainstream hit as a lead artist, reaching the top 15 of the Billboard Hot 100. The album was later certified platinum by the Recording Industry Association of America (RIAA) in September 2020.

== Background and singles ==
Tha Carter was originally slated to launch in late 2003, but due to a change in musical direction, features and legal issues, it was revised into the mixtape Da Drought. Much of the beats for the album were crafted by then-Cash Money's frequent record producer Mannie Fresh. Wayne eschewed writing and developing his rhymes with intention, and instead focused on feeling, entering a stream-of-consciousness state where he freestyled much of lyrics on the spot. Stylistically the album was developed with tastemakers and public perception in mind, but with a distinct Cash Money/NOLA bent: "We do what people want us to do, but our way," he confirmed.

The album's lead single, "Bring It Back" was released on April 10, 2004, while its second single, "Go D.J." was released on October 5, 2004. Both songs were produced by and featured guest vocals from Mannie Fresh. The album's third single, "Earthquake" was released on March 27, 2005. The song was produced by and featured guest vocals from fellow record producer Jazze Pha.

== Commercial performance ==
Tha Carter debuted at number five on the US Billboard 200 chart, selling 116,000 copies in its first week. This became Wayne's third US top-ten debut. As of November 2005, the album has sold 878,000 copies in the US, according to Nielsen SoundScan being certified Platinum for shipments of over a million copies in the United States. On September 25, 2020, the album was certified 2× platinum by the Recording Industry Association of America (RIAA) for combined sales and album-equivalent units of two million units in the United States.

== Reception ==
Professional ratings
Review scores
Source	Rating
AllMusic	3/5 stars
RapReviews	7.5/10
Rhapsody	(favorable)
Rolling Stone	3/5 stars
USA Today	3/4 stars
XXL	(XL)

Steve Jones of USA Today was positive, commenting: "Wayne takes you on a tour through his life as a well-heeled young hustler. The street themes and boastful banter are familiar, but he keeps things moving with witty deliveries and a few change-ups." Andy Kellman from AllMusic criticized the LP's runtime and lack of quality control, but also praised the beatmaking: "Mannie Fresh's stout production is in effect as ever, and to the MC's credit, the rhymes are less measured and are all the better for it." Christian Hoard from Rolling Stone concurred: "Most of Wayne's fourth album is filler that Lil Jon has made obsolete, but on more than a handful of tracks, Mannie Fresh's beats jump like they used to and Wayne's syrupy drawl sounds more dextrous than ever." Tom Briehan of Stereogum, in a twentieth anniversary appraisal of the record, considered it charming but conceded that "There’s no sense of construction or motivation [...] Tha Carter feels a little quaint now. It has moments of greatness, but it’s not exactly a great Lil Wayne album."

== Track listing ==
No.	Title	Writer(s)	Producer(s)	Length
1.	"Walk In"	Dwayne Carter, Jr.; Byron Thomas	Mannie Fresh	3:04
2.	"Go D.J."	Carter, Jr.; Thomas	Mannie Fresh	4:41
3.	"This Is the Carter" (featuring Mannie Fresh)	Carter, Jr.; Thomas	Mannie Fresh	4:36
4.	"BM J.R."	Carter, Jr.; Thomas; Batman	Mannie Fresh; Batman	4:58
5.	"On the Block #1 (skit)"		Mannie Fresh; Lil Wayne	0:18
6.	"I Miss My Dawgs" (featuring Reel)	Carter, Jr.; Thomas; R.Q. Dickerson	Mannie Fresh; Raj Smoove	4:35
7.	"We Don't" (featuring Birdman)	Carter, Jr.; Bryan Williams	Leslie Brathwaite	4:09
8.	"On My Own" (featuring Reel)	Carter, Jr.; Thomas	Mannie Fresh	4:28
9.	"Tha Heat"	Carter, Jr.; Dickerson	Raj Smoove	4:36
10.	"Cash Money Millionaires"	Carter, Jr.; Thomas	Mannie Fresh	4:42
11.	"Inside"	Carter, Jr.; Thomas	Mannie Fresh	1:30
12.	"Bring It Back" (featuring Mannie Fresh)	Carter, Jr.; Thomas	Mannie Fresh	4:21
13.	"Who Wanna"	Carter, Jr.; Dickerson	Raj Smoove	4:32
14.	"On the Block #2 (skit)"		Mannie Fresh; Lil Wayne	0:23
15.	"Get Down" (featuring Birdman)	Carter, Jr.; Thomas	Mannie Fresh	4:32
16.	"Snitch"	Carter, Jr.; Thomas	Mannie Fresh	3:55
17.	"Hoes" (featuring Mannie Fresh)	Carter, Jr.; Thomas	Mannie Fresh	4:32
18.	"Only Way" (featuring Birdman)	Carter, Jr.; Williams	Mannie Fresh	4:33
19.	"Earthquake" (featuring Jazze Pha)	Carter, Jr.; Thomas; Phalon Alexander	Mannie Fresh; Jazze Pha	5:16
20.	"Ain't That a Bitch"	Carter, Jr.; Thomas	Mannie Fresh	4:17
21.	"Walk Out"	Carter, Jr.; Thomas	Mannie Fresh	1:08
Total length:				79:07

- If the album was purchased in Canada, "Walk In", "Inside" and "Walk Out" are recorded on a different instrumental, with slightly different lyrics. "Earthquake" is replaced by the song "Crack Ya Bottle" by Lil Wayne featuring Reel, produced by the Architects. These changes are a result of sample clearance issues.
- "Earthquake" interpolates and samples "Let's Stay Together" by Al Green.

== Charts ==
=== Weekly charts ===
Chart (2004)	Peak position
US Billboard 200	5
US Top R&B/Hip-Hop Albums (Billboard)	2
US Top Rap Albums (Billboard)	2

=== Year-end charts ===
Chart (2004)	Position
US Billboard 200	116
US Top R&B/Hip-Hop Albums (Billboard)	22
US Top Rap Albums (Billboard)	13

Chart (2005)	Position
US Top R&B/Hip-Hop Albums (Billboard)	71

== Certifications ==
Region	Certification	Certified units/sales
United States (RIAA)	Platinum	1,000,000^{‡}
^{‡} Sales+streaming figures based on certification alone.
