= The Dedication =

Mixtape by Lil Wayne
- Released: March 30, 2005
- Genre: Hip-hop
- Length: 56:42
- Labels: Young Money, Cash Money, Aphilliates, Grand Hustle
- Producer: DJ Drama

Lil Wayne chronology
Tha Carter (2004)	The Dedication (2005)	Tha Carter II (2005)

The Dedication is the fifth mixtape by Lil Wayne, hosted by DJ Drama, released March 2005. It is the first mixtape in the Dedication/Gangsta Grillz series and it was produced and hosted by DJ Drama. The mixtape was given its name because as Wayne explains in the track "Intro", it is dedicated to everyone around the world and to the "fallen soldiers". The cover art shows a shirtless Wayne standing in the road with DJ Drama looking on in the back.

== Critical reception ==
The mixtape holds a rating of 5 stars (based on over 500 ratings) on DatPiff and has generated over 200,000 downloads. The mixtape has been described as "inspirational" and "a classic" by rap critics, paving the way for a world famous mixtape series.

== Track listing ==
- All tracks were arranged by DJ Drama.

#	Title	Length	Producer(s)	Featured Guest(s)	Sample(s)
1	"Dedication"	2:54			
2	"Intro"	1:02			
3	"Motivation"	1:15	DJ Toomp		"Motivation" by T.I.
4	"Over Here"	2:12		Boo	"Over Here" by Young Jeezy feat. Bun B
5	"Wayne Convos"	0:58			
6	"U Gon Love Me"	2:46	Milwaukee Black		"You Gonna Luv Me" by Da BackWudz feat. Milwaukee Black
7	"Down & Out"	2:49	Brian Miller, Kanye West		"Down and Out" by Cam'ron feat. Kanye West
8	"Wayne Explains His Deal"	1:37			
9	"Like Dat"	1:05	Eminem		"Like Dat" by Stat Quo
10	"Nah This Ain't The Remix"	4:10	The Neptunes		"Drop It Like It's Hot Remix" by Snoop Dogg feat. Pharrell Williams & Jay-Z
11	"Bass Beat"	2:14	Salaam Remi	Currensy	"You Know My Style" by Nas
12	"Young Money Property"	3:01	The Alchemist	Currensy, Boo & Mack Maine	"Still in Effect" by State Property
13	"Much More"	1:14	Cool & Dre		"So Much More" by Fat Joe
14	"Wayne's World Skit"	1:00			
15	"I'm A Ridah"	2:58	Johhny J, 2Pac		"Made Niggaz" by 2Pac & Outlawz
16	"D-Boyz"	1:47	Butta, Polow da Don		"D-Boyz" by Rich Boy feat. Mannie Fresh
17	"So Smooth w/ Young Money"	3:42		Currensy, Boo & Mack Maine	"Pop That" by David Banner feat. Sky Keeton
18	"Wayne's Ho Story"	1:40		Mack Maine	
19	"Momma Taught Me"	2:33	Questlove		"Star/Pointro" by The Roots feat. Wadud Ahmad
20	"Weezy F. Baby"	2:25	8Ball, MJG		"Mr. Big" by 8Ball & MJG
21	"Stilletos"	2:02	Lil Jay		"Stilletos (Pumps)" by Crime Mob
22	"1 King"	1:52	Mr. Lee, Bun B		"3 Kings" by Slim Thug
23	"Dedication Convo"	0:31			
24	"Please Say The Baby"	3:30		Currensy, Boo & Mack Maine	"Streetz Melting" by Jae Millz feat. Swizz Beatz
25	"Paid in Full (Skit)"	0:38			
26	"Alchemist Shit"	2:03		Currensy	"Backwards" by Mobb Deep
27	"Weezy Explains "Miss My Dawgs"	1:04			
28	"Miss My Dawgs (Live) w/ B.G.	1:16	Raj Smoove		"I Miss My Dawgs" by Lil Wayne feat. Reel
29	"Outro"	0:42			

== Young Money: The Mixtape ==
In February 2005, prior to the release of The Dedication, Wayne and his group, Young Money released a mixtape, Young Money: The Mixtape. It was a double disc tape and featured every song on The Dedication (besides "Please Say The Baby") without DJ Drama and in their original form. When DJ Drama re-released it as "The Dedication", he added his tags and cut out the other members of Young Money. He also mashed up some of the songs with different instrumentals:

- Motivation (Mashup of Young Money's freestyle over "No Problems" and T.I.'s "Motivation")
- Like Dat (Mashup of Young Money's freestyle over "New York" and Stat Quo's "Like Dat")
- Nah This Ain't The Remix (Mashup of Lil Wayne's freestyle over "Drop it like it's Hot" and Snoop Dogg's "Drop it like it's Hot [Remix]")
- Much More (Mashup of Young Money's freestyle over "Lean Back" and Fat Joe's "Much More")
- D-Boyz (Mashup of Young Money's freestyle over "Smoke, Drank" and Rich Boy's "D-Boyz")
- Stilettoes (Mashup of Young Money's freestyle over "Knuck if you Buck" and Crime Mob's "Stilettos")
