= Tha Block Is Hot =

Studio album by Lil Wayne
- Released: November 2, 1999
- Studios: Cash Money Studios, Metairie, Louisiana, U.S.
- Genres: Southern hip-hop; bounce; gangsta rap
- Length: 70:18
- Labels: Universal; Cash Money
- Producer: Mannie Fresh

Lil Wayne chronology
Tha Block Is Hot (1999)	Lights Out (2000)

Singles from Tha Block Is Hot
- 1. "Tha Block Is Hot" Released: October 23, 1999; 2. "Respect Us" Released: April 2, 2000

Tha Block Is Hot is the debut studio album by American rapper Lil Wayne. It was released on November 2, 1999, by Universal Records and Bryan "Baby" Williams' Cash Money Records. The recording sessions took place at Cash Money Studios in Metairie, Louisiana, with the executive production from Bryan "Baby" Williams and Ronald "Slim" Williams. The album was produced by Mannie Fresh.

== Background ==
The album was intended to be titled I Ride at Night.

== Critical reception ==
Professional ratings
Review scores
Source	Rating
AllMusic	3/5 stars
Hartford Courant	(positive)
The Harvard Crimson	C+
RapReviews	7/10
Robert Christgau	(2-star Honorable Mention)
The Rolling Stone Album Guide	4/5 stars

The Chicago Tribune wrote that "Wayne's appeal lies in his esoteric slang and squeaky-voiced phrasing."

== Commercial performance ==
"Tha Block Is Hot" debuted at number three on the US Billboard 200 chart, selling 229,500 copies in its first week. However, in its second week, the album dropped to number ten on the chart, with an additional 117,000 copies sold. On December 10, 1999, the album earned Platinum certification from the Recording Industry Association of America (RIAA) for exceeding a million copies in sales. As of June 2012, "Tha Block Is Hot" has sold 1.4 million copies in the United States.

== Track listing ==
- All songs produced by Mannie Fresh

No.	Title	Featured artist(s)	Length
1.	"Intro"	Big Tymers	1:47
2.	"Tha Block Is Hot"	B.G.; Juvenile	4:12
3.	"Loud Pipes"	B.G.; Juvenile; Big Tymers	5:14
4.	"Watcha Wanna Do"		3:50
5.	"Kisha"	Hot Boys	4:17
6.	"High Beamin'"	B.G.	4:09
7.	"Lights Off"		4:07
8.	"Fuck tha World"		4:46
9.	"Remember Me"	B.G.	3:54
10.	"Respect Us"	Juvenile	5:01
11.	"Drop It Like It's Hot"	B.G.; Mannie Fresh	5:23
12.	"Young Playa"	Big Tymers	3:47
13.	"Enemy Turf"	Juvenile	4:19
14.	"Not Like Me"	B.G.; Big Tymers; Paparue	4:03
15.	"Come On"	B.G.	3:35
16.	"Up to Me"		4:31
17.	"You Want War"	Turk	3:25
Total length:			70:18

Samples credits

- "Loud Pipes" contains a sample of "Rich Niggaz" performed by Juvenile.

== Charts ==
=== Weekly charts ===
Chart (1999)	Peak position
US Billboard 200	3
US Top R&B/Hip-Hop Albums (Billboard)	1

=== Year-end charts ===
Chart (2000)	Position
US Billboard 200	112
US Top R&B/Hip-Hop Albums (Billboard)	36

== Certifications ==
Region	Certification	Certified units/sales
United States (RIAA)	Platinum	1,000,000^{^}
^{^} Shipments figures based on certification alone.
