= Lil Wayne =

American rapper (born 1982)

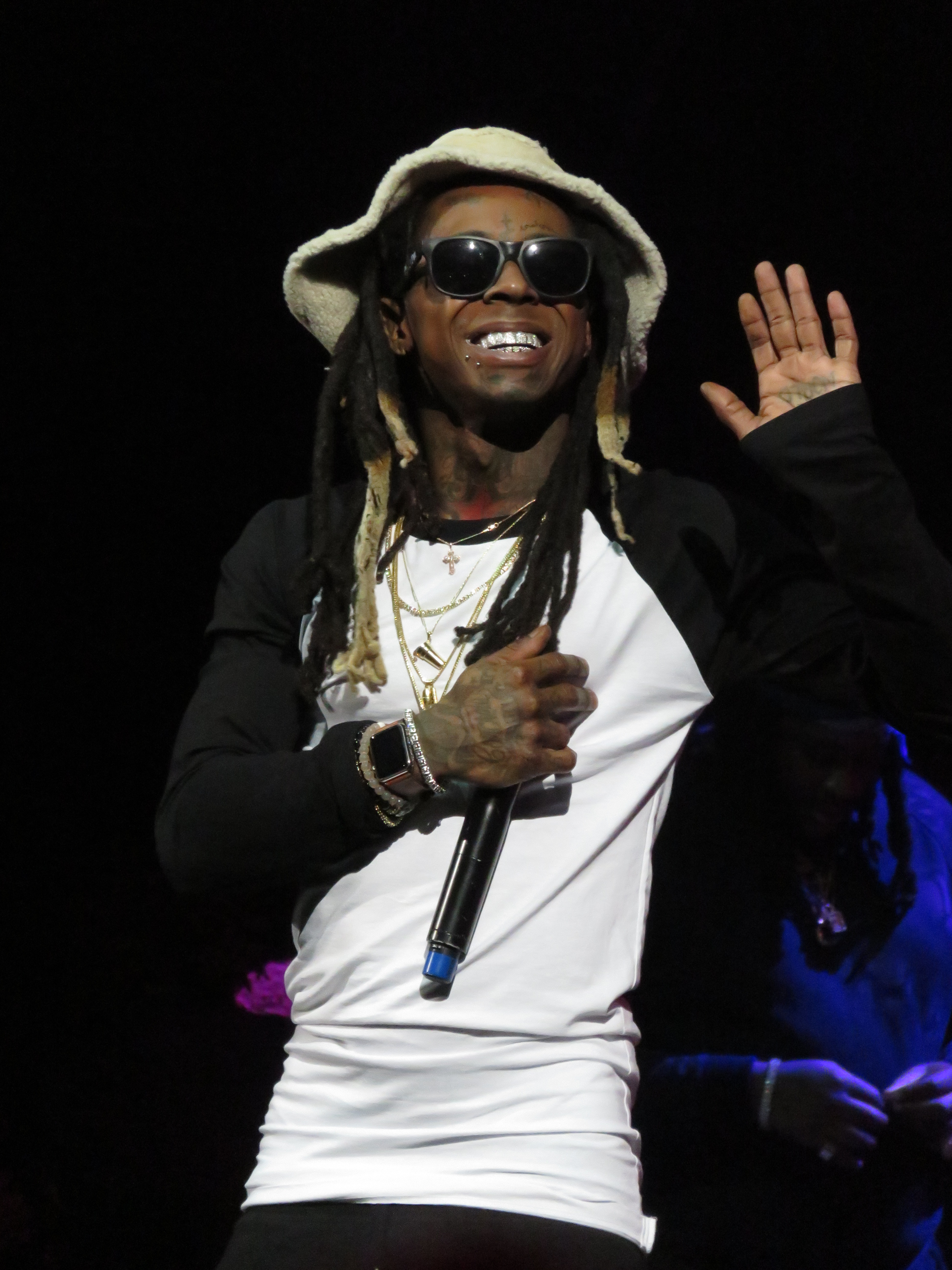
- Carter in 2015
- Born: Dwayne Michael Carter Jr. September 27, 1982 (age 44); New Orleans, Louisiana, U.S.
- Other names: Baby D; Shrimp Daddy; Birdman Jr.; Tunechi; Weezy; Weezy F. Baby; The President
- Occupations: Rapper; singer; songwriter; record executive; actor; entrepreneur
- Years active: 1991–present
- Works: Albums; singles; videography
- Title: Founder of Young Money Entertainment; Co-founder of Trukfit Clothing
- Spouse: Toya Johnson (m. 2004; div. 2006)
- Partners: Nivea (2002–2003, 2009–2010; ex-fiancée); La'Tecia Thomas (2019–2020; ex-fiancée); Denise Bidot (2020–2022)
- Children: 4
- Awards: Full list
- Musical career
- Genres: Southern hip-hop; bounce; gangsta rap; trap; pop rap
- Labels: Universal; Young Money; Republic; Cash Money
- Member of: Hot Boyz
- Formerly of: Cash Money Millionaires; The B.G.'z; Sqad Up
- Website: thacarterv.com

Dwayne Michael Carter Jr. (born September 27, 1982), known professionally as Lil Wayne, is an American rapper, singer, songwriter, and record executive. He is often regarded as one of the most influential hip-hop artists of his generation, as well as one of the greatest rappers of all time. Born and raised in New Orleans, he was discovered by hometown rapper Birdman in 1993 and signed with his record label, Cash Money Records, at age 11. He emerged as the label's flagship artist until his departure in 2018.

Carter was initially placed in a duo with another artist signed to Cash Money Records. B.G. in 1994—known collectively as the B.G.'z—and they released the album True Story that year, although Carter (at the time known as Baby D) appeared on only three of its tracks. Carter and B.G. then formed the Southern hip-hop group Hot Boys with labelmates Juvenile and Turk in 1997, and released their debut album, Get It How U Live! that year. The Hot Boys gained mainstream success after the release of their second album Guerrilla Warfare (1999) and their appearance on B.G.'s single, "Bling Bling." The group briefly disbanded after the album due to each member (besides Carter) parting ways with the label, although one further album—Let 'Em Burn (2003)—was released.

Carter's debut studio album, Tha Block Is Hot (1999), was his breakthrough as a solo artist, quickly achieving commercial success. It was followed by Lights Out (2000) and 500 Degreez (2003). Carter is credited with revolutionizing the mixtape scene with his innovative approach in the 2000s. His fourth and fifth albums, Tha Carter (2004) and Tha Carter II (2005), both debuted within the top five of the Billboard 200 and received critical acclaim. His sixth album, Tha Carter III (2008), yielded the pinnacle of Wayne's career, with first-week sales of over one million units domestically. It won the Best Rap Album at the 51st Annual Grammy Awards and was supported by his first Billboard Hot 100-number one single "Lollipop" (featuring Static Major), and the top-ten singles "A Milli" and "Got Money" (featuring T-Pain).

Carter's seventh studio album, Rebirth (2010), experimented with rap rock and was released to generally negative critical reception. A month after its release, he began serving an 8-month jail sentence for criminal possession of a weapon stemming from an incident in 2007. His eighth album, I Am Not a Human Being (2010), was released during his incarceration, while his ninth album, Tha Carter IV (2011), followed months after his release from prison. Despite mixed reviews, Tha Carter IV sold 964,000 units in its first-week in the U.S. His 12th studio album, Tha Carter V (2018)—preceded by I Am Not a Human Being II (2013) and Free Weezy Album (2015)—was released following long-term delays and label disputes, and sold 480,000 units in its first-week. His 13th album, Funeral (2020), became his fifth non-consecutive number one album, followed by his 14th album, Tha Carter VI (2025).

Carter has sold over 120 million records worldwide, including over 25 million albums and 95 million digital tracks in the U.S., making him one of the world's best-selling music artists. He has won five Grammy Awards, 11 BET Awards, four Billboard Music Awards, two MTV Video Music Awards and eight NAACP Image Awards. On September 27, 2012, he became the first male artist to surpass Elvis Presley with the most entries on the Billboard Hot 100, with 109 songs. Carter founded the record label Young Money Entertainment in 2005, which has signed artists including Drake, Tyga and Nicki Minaj.

== Early life ==
Dwayne Michael Carter Jr. was born on September 27, 1982. He spent his first few years in the impoverished Hollygrove neighborhood of Uptown New Orleans, Louisiana's 17th Ward. His mother, a cook, gave birth to him when she was 19 years old. His parents divorced when he was two years old, and his father permanently abandoned the family. In a 2009 interview, CBS News anchor Katie Couric asked the rapper why he used the name Wayne instead of his given name. Carter replied, "I'll tell you why I dropped the D right here on TV. I dropped the D because I am a junior. My father, he's livin', and he is not in my life and he's never been in my life. So I don't wanna be Dwayne. I'd rather be Wayne." Couric asked if his father knew that, and Carter, chuckling, said, "He knows it now." Carter has said that he considers his deceased stepfather Reginald "Rabbit" McDonald to be his real father. Carter has a tattoo dedicated to McDonald.

Carter was enrolled in the gifted program at Lafayette Elementary School. He later attended Eleanor McMain Secondary School for two years, where he was an honor student and a member of the drama club, playing the Tin Man in the school's production of The Wiz. Despite matriculating to Marion Abramson Senior High School, Carter left during his tenth grade year to pursue a GED. Carter's mother made the decision to remove him from school for his safety. At 15, Carter was already finding success in the music industry; his mother decided he needed to leave high school after discovering the gun he packed in his school bag for protection.

Carter wrote his first rap song at age eight. In the summer of 1991, he met rapper and Cash Money Records co-founder Bryan "Baby" Williams (known currently as Birdman), who mentored him and encouraged his love of hip-hop; Birdman included Carter on several Cash Money tracks, and he (in return) would often record freestyle raps on Williams' answering machine.

In 1994, at age 12, Carter suffered a near-fatal self-inflicted gunshot wound to the chest. At the time, he said the injury was accidental. However, in September 2018, Carter claimed in interviews that it was a suicide attempt after he was told by his mother that he would have to end his rap-related associations. Carter credits off-duty police officer Robert Hoobler (1956–2022), who he calls "Uncle Bob", with saving his life by insisting the dying child be driven immediately to hospital in a police car rather than waiting for an ambulance to become available. Other accounts indicate that several officers played a part in deciding on and implementing that course of action.

== Career ==
=== 1994–1999: Career beginnings and Hot Boys ===
After recovering from his self-inflicted gunshot wound, Carter linked with Christopher Dorsey, a local New Orleans rapper known as B.G., his longtime friend, future Cash Money labelmate and Hot Boys bandmate. They would later form their duo, the B.G.'z, with B.G. being named "Lil Doogie" and Carter being "Baby D". They only released one album under the group name, True Story (1995).

In 1997, Carter and Dorsey then joined the hip-hop quartet, the Hot Boys, along with rappers and labelmates, Juvenile, and Turk. Having joined at age 14, Carter was the youngest member at the time. Hot Boys' debut album, Get It How U Live!, was released the same year, followed in 1999 by the group's major-label debut Guerrilla Warfare, which respectively reached number one on the Billboard Top R&B/Hip-Hop Albums chart and number five on the Billboard 200. During their career, the Hot Boys had two charting singles, "We on Fire" from Get It How U Live! and "I Need a Hot Girl" from Guerrilla Warfare. The group shared a track, "Bling Bling", alongside another Cash Money group, duo Big Tymers (consisting of Birdman and producer Mannie Fresh). Carter's verse appeared only on the radio version of the song, while on the album version he performed on the chorus. "Bling Bling" appeared on Hot Boys member B.G.'s solo album, Chopper City in the Ghetto, released in April 1999. Carter was also featured on Juvenile's single "Back That Azz Up", which reached number eighteen on the Billboard Hot 100 and number five on the Hot R&B/Hip-Hop Singles & Tracks.

Let 'Em Burn, a compilation album of unreleased tracks recorded by the quartet during 1998 and 2000, was released in March 2003, several years after the group disbanded. It reached number three on the Top R&B/Hip-Hop Albums chart, but underperformed on the Billboard 200 at number fourteen.

=== 1999–2004: Tha Block Is Hot, Lights Out, and 500 Degreez ===
Carter's debut solo album, Tha Block Is Hot, was released on November 2, 1999, when he was 17 and featured significant contributions from the Hot Boys. It debuted at number three on the Billboard 200 and was later certified platinum by the RIAA in December 1999, less than a month after its release. The album earned Carter a 1999 Source magazine nomination for "Best New Artist", and also became a Top Ten hit. The lead single was the album's title track, which its chorus was performed by Carter's former Hot Boys cohort, Juvenile and B.G.

His second album, Lights Out, was released on December 19, 2000. It failed to attain the level of success achieved by his debut, but was certified gold by RIAA in June 2001, nearly six months after its release. Critics noted the lack of coherent narratives in his verses as evidence that he had yet to mature to the level of his fellow Hot Boys. The lead single was "Get Off the Corner", which was noticed for an improvement in its lyrical content and style. The second single, which received less attention, was "Shine" featuring the Hot Boys. Near the release of Lights Out, Carter was featured on the single, "Number One Stunna" with Big Tymers and Juvenile, which peaked at number 24 on the Hot Rap Tracks chart. The track, originally featured on Big Tymers' I Got That Work, would be used for the Spike Lee-directed comedy film, The Original Kings of Comedy.

Carter's third album, 500 Degreez, was released in August 2002. It followed the format of his previous two, with significant contributions from the Hot Boys and Mannie Fresh. While being certified gold like its predecessor, it also failed to match the success of his debut. The title was a reference to the recently estranged Hot Boys member Juvenile's debut solo studio album, 400 Degreez (1998). Its lead single was "Way of Life", featuring Birdman and singer TQ with narration by its producer, Mannie Fresh; it reached number 71 on the Billboard Hot 100 and number 23 on the Hot R&B/Hip-Hop Songs charts. The single featured a sample of Tupac Shakur's diss track towards the Notorious B.I.G., "Hit 'Em Up" (1996), which itself sampled Dennis Edwards and Siedah Garrett's "Don't Look Any Further" (1984). Despite the album's commercial failure, John Bush of AllMusic praised 500 Degreez, while calling "Way of Life" an "infectious party hit". After the release of 500 Degreez, Carter was featured on the single "Neva Get Enuf" by 3LW, and later appeared on his future girlfriend, singer Nivea's single, "Ya Ya Ya".

=== 2004–2006: Tha Carter, Tha Carter II, and Like Father, Like Son ===
On June 29, 2004, Carter's fourth studio album, Tha Carter, was released, marking what critics considered advancement in his rapping style and lyrical themes. In addition, the album's cover art featured the debut of Wayne's now-signature dreadlocks. Tha Carter gained Wayne significant recognition, selling 878,000 copies in the United States, while the single "Go DJ" became a top five hit on the Billboard Hot R&B/Hip-Hop Songs chart. After the release of Tha Carter, Lil Wayne was featured on Destiny's Child's single "Soldier" alongside Atlanta rapper T.I., which peaked at number three on the Billboard Hot 100 and the Hot R&B/Hip-Hop Songs charts.

In 2005, Carter appeared on a remix of singer Bobby Valentino's "Tell Me", which rose to number thirteen on the U.S. Hot R&B Songs chart. That same year, Carter was named the president of Cash Money Records, but was later granted his own label; he founded Young Money Entertainment as an imprint of Cash Money and Universal Music Group. However, as of late 2007, Carter reported having stepped down from the management of both labels and handed management of Young Money over to his longtime manager, Cortez Bryant.

Tha Carter II, the sequel to 2004's Tha Carter, was released on December 6, 2005. Mannie Fresh was not involved in the production of the album, as he had left the label prior, due to financial issues. Tha Carter II sold more than 238,000 copies in its first week of release, debuting at number two on the Billboard 200; the album went on to sell two million copies worldwide. The lead single, "Fireman", became a hit in the U.S., peaking at 32 on the Billboard Hot 100 chart. Other singles included "Grown Man" with Currensy, "Hustler Musik", and "Shooter" with R&B singer Robin Thicke.

In 2006, Carter collaborated with his label boss, Birdman, for the album, Like Father, Like Son, which its first single "Stuntin' Like My Daddy", reached number 21 on the Billboard Hot 100.

=== 2006–2007: Mixtapes and collaborations ===
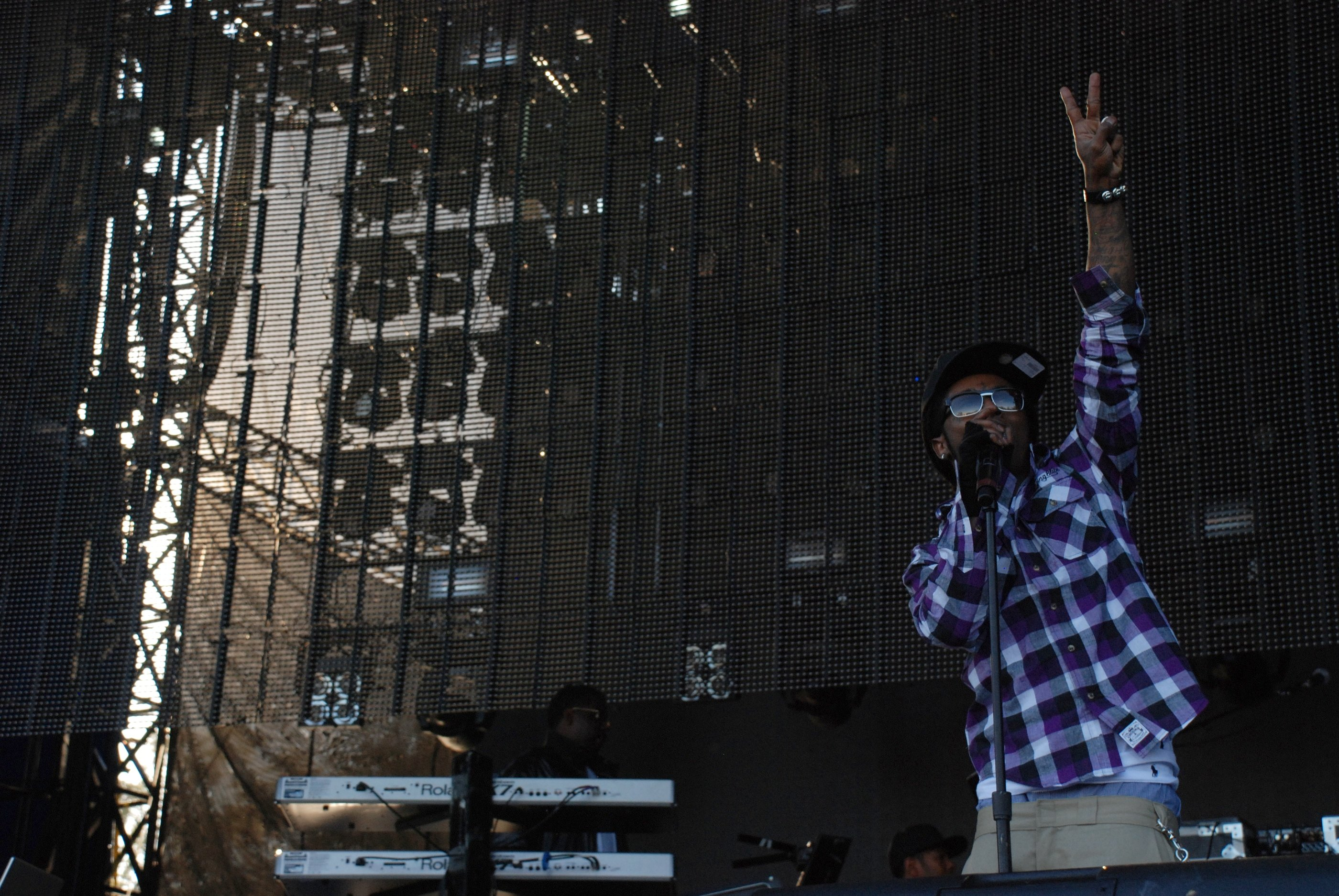
Carter performing at Voodoo Music Experience in 2008

Instead of a follow-up solo album, Carter began to reach his audience through a plethora of mixtapes and guest appearances on a variety of pop, R&B and hip-hop singles. Of his many mixtapes, Dedication 2 and Da Drought 3 received the most media exposure and critical review. Dedication 2, released in 2006, paired Carter with DJ Drama and contained the acclaimed socially conscious track, "Georgia Bush", a remix of Field Mob and Ludacris' "Georgia", in which Carter critiqued former U.S. president George W. Bush's response to the effects of Hurricane Katrina on the city of New Orleans. Da Drought 3 was released the following year and was available for free legal download. It contained Carter rapping over a variety of beats from recent hits by other musicians. A number of prominent hip-hop magazines such as XXL and Vibe covered the mixtape. Christian Hoard of Rolling Stone magazine considered the mixtapes Da Drought 3 and The Drought Is Over 2 (The Carter 3 Sessions) "among the best albums of 2007".

Despite no album release for two years, Carter appeared in numerous singles as a featured performer, including in 2006 with the remix to "Gimme That" by Chris Brown, "Make It Rain" by Fat Joe and "You" by Lloyd, and in 2007 with "We Takin' Over" by DJ Khaled (also featuring Akon, T.I., Rick Ross, Fat Joe, and Birdman), "Duffle Bag Boy" by Playaz Circle, "Sweetest Girl (Dollar Bill)" by Wyclef Jean (also featuring Akon), and the remix to "I'm So Hood" by DJ Khaled (also featuring T-Pain, Young Jeezy, Ludacris, Busta Rhymes, Big Boi, Fat Joe, Birdman, and Rick Ross). All these singles charted within the top 20 spots on the Billboard Hot 100, Hot Rap Tracks, and Hot R&B/Hip-Hop Songs charts. On Birdman's 2007 album, 5 * Stunna, Carter appeared on the singles "100 Million" and "I Run This" among several other tracks. Carter also appeared on tracks from albums, Getback by Little Brother, American Gangster by Jay-Z, and Graduation by Kanye West and Insomniac by Enrique Iglesias. "Make It Rain" (2006), a Scott Storch production that peaked at number thirteen on the Hot 100 and number two on the Hot Rap Tracks chart, was nominated for the Grammy Award for Best Rap Performance by a Duo or Group for 2008.

Vibe magazine ranked a list of 77 of Lil Wayne's songs from 2007 and ranked his verse in DJ Khaled's "We Takin Over" as his best of 2007, with "Dough Is What I Got" (a freestyle over the beat of Jay-Z's "Show Me What You Got") from Da Drought 3. At the end of 2007, an MTV poll selected Lil Wayne as "Hottest MC in the Game", The New Yorker magazine ranked him "Rapper of the Year", and GQ magazine named him "Workaholic of the Year". In 2008, he was named "Best MC" by Rolling Stone. Another article, built around Lil Wayne's 2007 mixtape work, cites his creative practice as an example of post-performance creative practice.

=== 2007–2010: Tha Carter III, We Are Young Money, and Rebirth ===
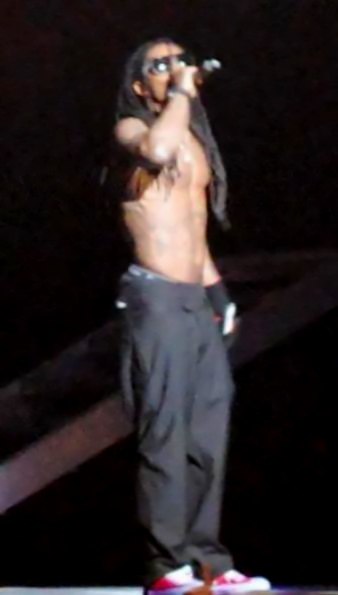
Carter performing in concert at Rogers Arena in Vancouver, Canada, January 2009

In 2007, Carter stated that he would reunite with Hot Boys, with plans to release an album after B.G.'s solo album Too Hood to Be Hollywood was completed. Tha Carter III was originally scheduled to be released in 2007, but it was delayed after several recordings were leaked and distributed through mixtapes, including The Drought Is Over Pt. 2 and The Drought Is Over Pt. 4. Lil Wayne initially planned to release The Leak, a separate album with leaked songs and four additional tracks, on December 18, 2007, with Tha Carter III delayed to March 18, 2008. Instead, The Leak became an EP with five songs and was released digitally on December 25, 2007.

Tha Carter III was released on June 10, 2008, with first-week sales of over 1 million copies, the first to do so since 50 Cent's The Massacre (2005). The album's first single, "Lollipop", featuring Static Major, became the Carter's most successful song at the time, topping the Billboard Hot 100 and becoming his first top ten single as a solo artist and his first number one on the chart. The third single "Got Money", featuring T-Pain, peaked at number thirteen on the Billboard 100. Tha Carter III went on to win four Grammy Awards, including Best Rap Album and Best Rap Song, which he won for "Lollipop". On July 14, 2008, the Recording Industry Association of America certified Tha Carter III two times platinum. In October 2008, Lil Wayne announced plans to MTV News to re-release the album with new tracks, including a duet with Ludacris and remixes of "A Milli".

Carter also appeared on R&B singles "Girls Around the World" by Lloyd, "Love in This Club, Part II" by Usher, "Official Girl" by Cassie, "I'm So Paid" by Akon, "Turnin' Me On" by Keri Hilson, and "Can't Believe It" by T-Pain; rap singles "My Life" by The Game, "Shawty Say" by David Banner, "Swagga Like Us" by T.I., "Cutty Buddy" by Mike Jones, All My Life (In the Ghetto) by Jay Rock and the remix to "Certified" by Glasses Malone; and pop single "Let It Rock" by new Cash Money artist Kevin Rudolf.

Throughout 2008, Carter performed at the Voodoo Experience in October in New Orleans, which was described by Jonathan Cohen of Billboard as his biggest hometown headlining set of his career. He also performed at the Virgin Mobile Music Fest with Kanye West, where they performed the remix of "Lollipop" and lip-synced to Whitney Houston's "I Will Always Love You". Lil Wayne also performed at the 2008 MTV Video Music Awards with Kid Rock ("All Summer Long"), Leona Lewis ("DontGetIt (Misunderstood)") and T-Pain ("Got Money") and performed "Lollipop" and "Got Money" on the season premiere of Saturday Night Live. He later performed at the homecoming rally at Vanderbilt University and the 2008 BET Hip Hop Awards, where he received 12 nominations. He won eight awards at the BET Hip Hop Awards, one of which included the "MVP" title. After M.I.A. dropped out of performing on Carter's I Am Music Tour due to her pregnancy, Jay-Z performed "Mr. Carter" with Lil Wayne at select shows.

After Tha Carter III sold over 3 million copies and became the best-selling record of 2008, Carter re-signed with Cash Money Records for a multi-album deal. On November 11, 2008, Carter became the first hip-hop act to perform at the Country Music Association Awards, playing "All Summer Long" alongside Kid Rock, in which Carter inaudibly strummed guitar strings alongside the guitarist in Kid Rock's band. Shortly after, Wayne was nominated for eight Grammys – the most for any artist nominated that year. He was then named the first MTV Man of the Year at the end of 2008. He won the Grammy Award for Best Rap Solo Performance for "A Milli", Best Rap Performance by a Duo or Group for his appearance on T.I.'s single "Swagga Like Us", and Best Rap Song for "Lollipop". Tha Carter III won the award for Best Rap Album. MTV News listed Carter number two on their 2009 list of the Hottest MCs in the Game.

Prior to the 2009 Grammy Awards, Wayne was featured in an interview with Katie Couric. On February 7, 2009, he presented the Top Ten List on CBS's Late Show with David Letterman. On April 24, 2009, he appeared on The View, discussing his GED and addictions. In September 2009, Carter was profiled in an episode of VH1's Behind the Music and was a presenter of the 2009 MTV Movie Awards. In film, Carter produced and composed music for and starred in the direct-to-video film Hurricane Season. A documentary of Carter, titled The Carter, was released at the Sundance Film Festival.

On December 23, 2009, Carter released his label, Young Money's first compilation album, We Are Young Money, with its lead single being "Every Girl". The second single was "BedRock", featuring Lloyd, with the third being "Roger That". On May 24, 2010, the album was certified gold by the RIAA with over 500,000 copies sold. Carter is featured on the song, "Revolver", with Madonna for her greatest hits album, Celebration (2009). He was also featured on a Weezer song, "Can't Stop Partying", on Raditude (2009). In late 2008, Carter announced plans to reissue Tha Carter III with leftover recordings, and was to be titled Rebirth, originally scheduled to be released on April 7, 2009, before being delayed several times. Rebirth instead became his sixth solo studio album, re-recorded with replaced material and later released on February 2, 2010. The album received negative reviews from fans and critics, considering it Carter's worst album released since 500 Degreez (2002).

To support its release and that of We Are Young Money, Carter was featured on the cover of Rolling Stone and headlined the 'Young Money Presents: America's Most Wanted Music Festival', a United States and Canada–only concert tour which began on July 29, 2009. "Prom Queen", the first official single, debuted on January 27, 2009, immediately after a live Internet broadcast of his concert in San Diego on Ustream (now IBM Cloud Video). It peaked at number fifteen on the Billboard Hot 100 charts. On December 3, 2009, the second single, "On Fire", produced by Cool & Dre, was released. Based on a sample of Amy Holland's "She's on Fire" from the soundtrack to the 1983 film, Scarface, "On Fire" peaked at number 33 on the Billboard Hot 100 chart. "Drop the World", which features Eminem, was the album's third single; it was produced by a then-unknown Hit-Boy.

=== 2010–2013: I Am Not a Human Being series and Tha Carter IV ===
In an interview on MTV's Mixtape Monday, Carter hinted at the release of Tha Carter IV. He later announced that it would be released in late 2009 before the holiday season. Birdman had previously stated that Tha Carter IV would be packaged with Rebirth as a double disc album. Carter denied this, saying that "Tha Carter IV deserves Tha Carter IV", adding that We Are Young Money may be packaged with Rebirth. These albums were eventually released separately.

Carter released his eighth album, I Am Not a Human Being, on his 28th birthday, September 27, 2010. The album was released during Carter's incarceration on a weapon possession charge. The album has sold over 953,000 copies in the U.S. and spawned the successful single "Right Above It", which peaked at number six on the Billboard Hot 100. The album also debuted at number two, but later climbed to number one on the Billboard 200, making Carter the first rapper while incarcerated (since Tupac Shakur's Me Against the World, released in 1995) to have a number one album.

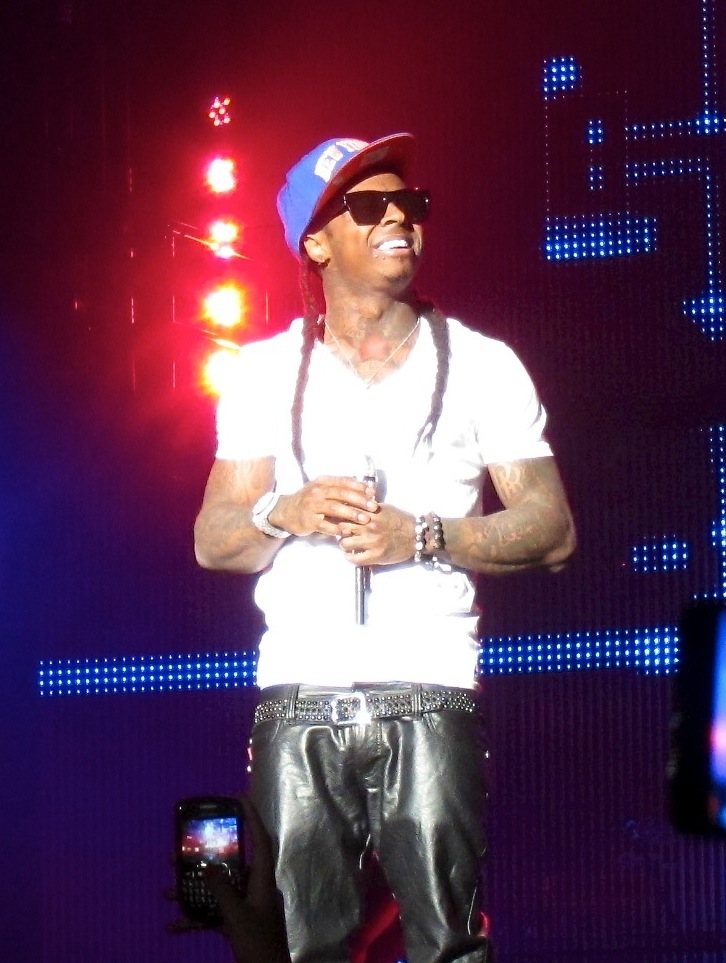
Carter in 2011

Tha Carter IV was delayed into 2011, after Lil Wayne began recording from scratch after his release from prison. He described his first song since his release as "a 2010 version of A Milli on steroids". The lead single from Tha Carter IV, "6 Foot 7 Foot" featuring Cory Gunz, was released on December 15, 2010. On March 8, Carter released another song, "We Back Soon", though it was not included on the official track listing of Tha Carter IV. The second single, "John", featuring Rick Ross, was released on March 24. In an interview on March 29, Carter announced that he would retire at age 35; saying that "I would feel selfish still going to the studio when it's such a vital point" in the lives of his four children. Throughout a two-year period between 2010 and 2012, Carter has been featured in many hit singles such as "I Made It (Cash Money Heroes)" by Kevin Rudolf, "Miss Me", "The Motto", and "HYFR (Hell Ya Fucking Right)" by Drake, "No Love" by Eminem, "Hit the Lights" by Jay Sean, "Look at Me Now" by Chris Brown, "Welcome to My Hood", "I'm on One", "Take It to the Head", and "No New Friends" by DJ Khaled, "Motivation" by Kelly Rowland, "Ballin'" by Young Jeezy, "Strange Clouds" by B.o.B, "I Can Only Imagine" by David Guetta, "Faded" by Tyga, "Pop That" by French Montana, and "Bandz a Make Her Dance" by Juicy J.

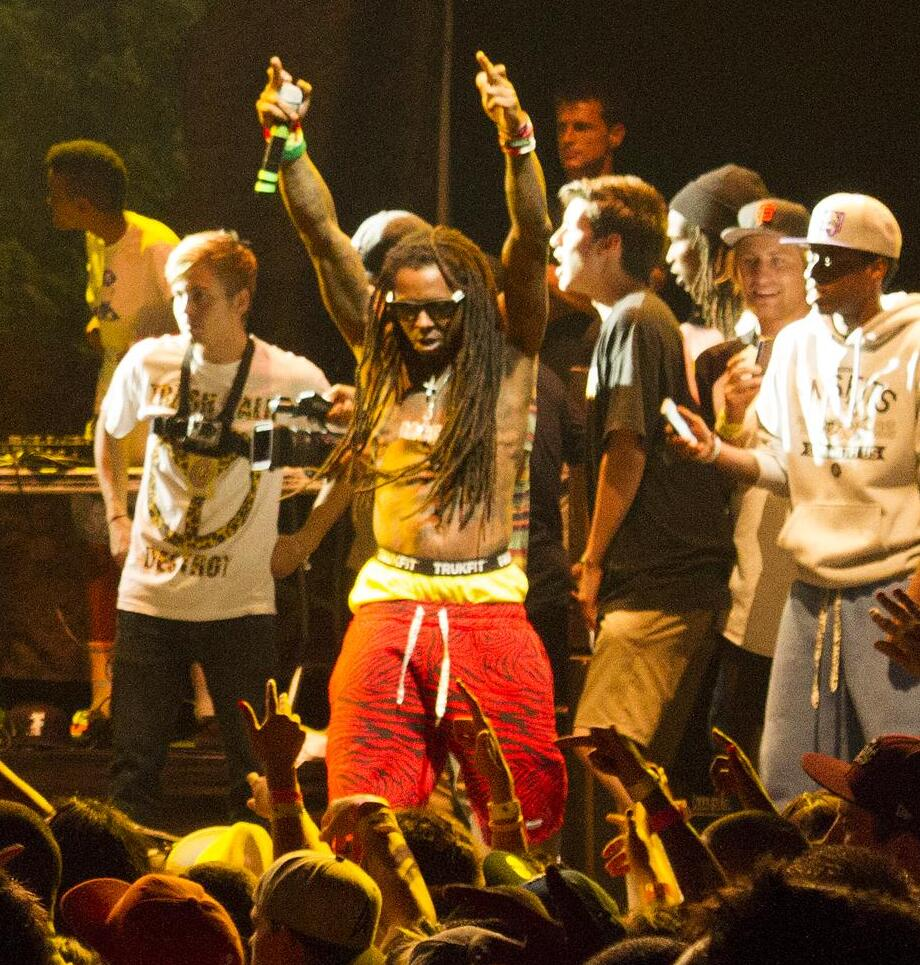
Carter performing in 2012

The artwork for Tha Carter IV was unveiled on April 20. Originally scheduled to be released on May 16, it was delayed several times until being confirmed for release on August 29, 2011. On May 26, the album's third single, "How to Love", was released. He released another track, "Dear Anne (Stan Part 2)", in June. In preparation for Tha Carter IV, Carter released a mixtape, Sorry 4 the Wait, in similarity to his mixtape No Ceilings (2009); the mixtape was re-released on streaming services in January 2022 with four additional tracks.

Finally released on August 29, 2011, Tha Carter IV debuted at number one on the Billboard 200, with first-week sales of 964,000 copies (overshadowing the first-week sales of Jay-Z and Kanye West's Watch the Throne), making it Carter's third chart-topping album of his career. On January 8, 2012, according to Nielsen SoundScan, Carter was the seventh all-time best-selling artist for digital track sales with 36,788,000 million to the end of 2011.

In October 2011, it was reported that Carter was working on sequels to both I Am Not a Human Being and Rebirth. In January 2012, Birdman announced that he and Carter had finished recording Like Father, Like Son 2. On November 22, 2012, Carter announced that Tha Carter V would be his final album, as he wanted to pursue other interests.

After a one-year delay, I Am Not a Human Being II was released on March 26, 2013, debuting at number two on the Billboard 200 selling 217,000 copies in its first week; "My Homies Still", "Love Me", and "No Worries" were released as singles prior to its release. The album was met with generally mixed reviews, with most critics noticing the declining quality of his releases. Carter toured North America with 2 Chainz and T.I. on the second America's Most Wanted Festival. On May 3, 2013, Pepsi dropped Carter, who was a spokesperson for Mountain Dew, due to him performing offensive lyrics about civil rights icon Emmett Till on the remix to rapper Future's single, "Karate Chop". On September 1, 2013, Carter released Dedication 5, the fifth instalment of the Dedication mixtape series. The mixtape featured 29 tracks, with guest appearances from several members of Young Money.

=== 2014–2019: Free Weezy Album and Tha Carter V ===
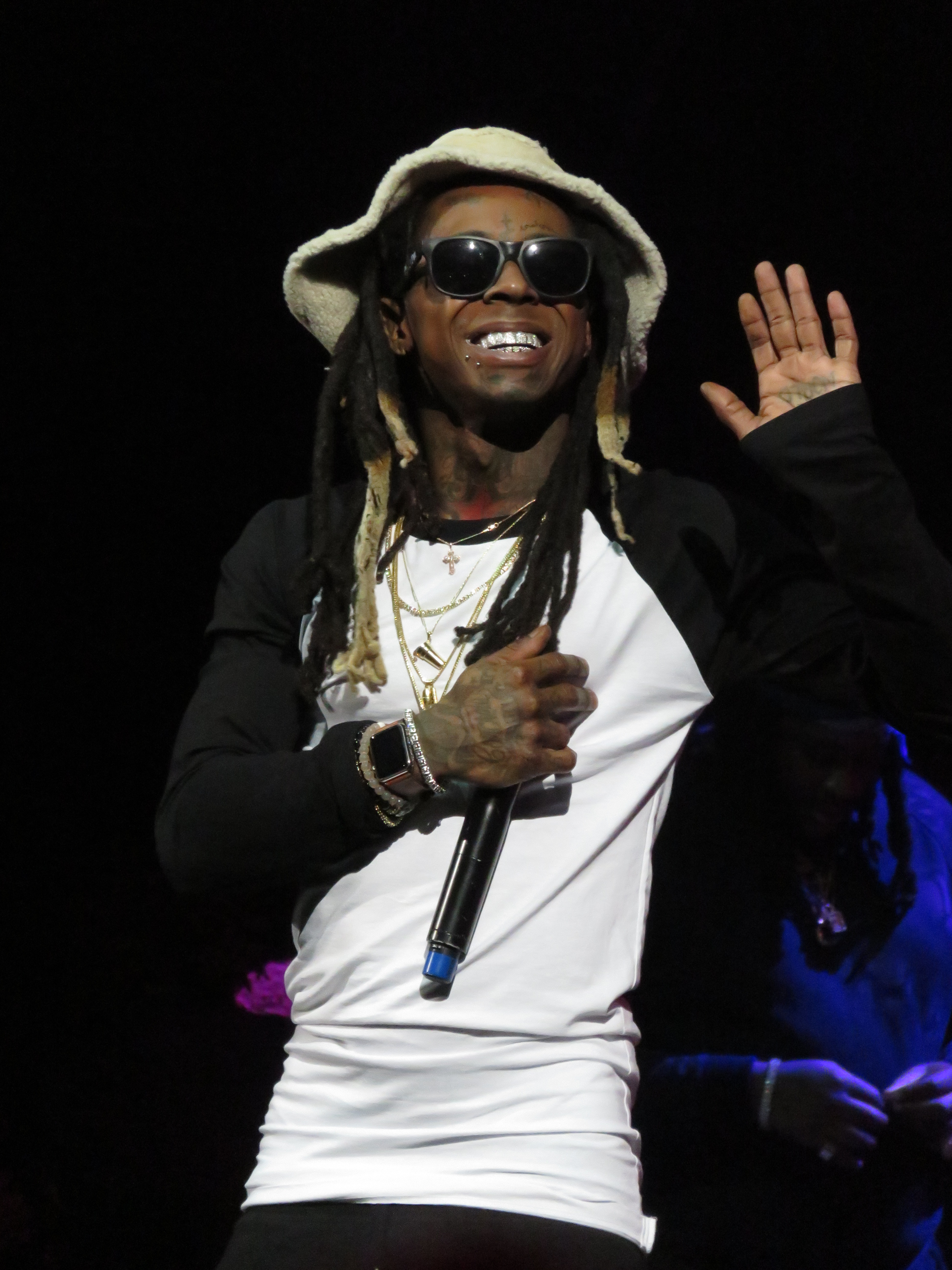
Carter performing in 2015

On October 18, 2013, former Cash Money Records vice president of promotion Mel Smith, tweeted: "Happy Friday!! New YMCMB music coming soon!! Carter 5." Nearly four months later, in an interview with The Griffin, released on February 14, 2014, Smith spoke on the upcoming album: "We're very close to dropping the album. It's going to be a huge surprise to everyone ... I can't release the date because he wants to surprise people." On February 15, during Drake's performance at the NBA All-Star Weekend festivities in New Orleans, Carter appeared as a guest performer before announcing that Tha Carter V would be released on May 5, 2014. In March 2014, Carter again said during an interview at SXSW that Tha Carter V would be his last album.

On March 27, 2014, Carter's manager Cortez Bryant announced that the album had been delayed. Carter then released the single "Believe Me", which features vocals from Drake, to mainstream urban radio in the United States on May 6, 2014. Three more singles, "Krazy", "Grindin'" (featuring Drake) and "Start a Fire" (featuring Christina Milian), were also released, but ultimately scrapped from the album.

Carter and Drake embarked on their joint tour, Drake vs. Lil Wayne (running from August 8 to September 28, 2014), determining who is "the best rapper on tour and in the world". The concept of the tour was based on the Street Fighter franchise. It was the third-largest grossing hip-hop concert tour of 2014 behind Eminem and Rihanna's Monster Tour, and Jay-Z and Beyoncé's On the Run Tour.

In late 2014, Carter claimed that the album's release was postponed due to his financial disputes with Cash Money.

On January 20, 2015, Carter self-released Sorry 4 the Wait 2, a sequel to his 2011 mixtape, to compensate for the continued delay of Tha Carter V. In February 2015, due to Tha Carter V's delay, Carter announced that a free album would be released prior to the fifth installment in his popular series. In June 2015, Carter joined Jay-Z's TIDAL, as an artist owner, kicking off the partnership by exclusively releasing a single on the service titled "Glory". He also announced plans on his own TIDAL X concert series. On July 4, 2015, Carter released Free Weezy Album, exclusively through TIDAL, under Young Money and Republic Records. On January 27, 2016, when rapper 2 Chainz released his "Felt Like Cappin" EP, Carter is featured on the lead single titled "Back on That Bullshit". On March 4, 2016, 2 Chainz released his third studio album, ColleGrove. The album was initially a collaborative effort between 2 Chainz and Carter, but due to his record label issues, only 2 Chainz was credited as the primary artist. On June 28, 2016, Carter was one of several artists who appeared on the track "Sucker for Pain" for the film Suicide Squad. In September 2016, Carter tweeted "I AM NOW DEFENSELESS and mentally DEFEATED", followed by stating "I'm done", hinting at a possible retirement. Many rappers responded with respect and encouragement.

In 2017, Carter announced he had signed with Jay-Z's Roc Nation, although he later stated that there was no official paperwork that he signed to the label. On August 8, 2017, he released the song "Like a Man" with sound engineer Onhel. On June 7, 2018, it was announced that Carter had been released from Cash Money Records and would be releasing Tha Carter V via Young Money and Republic Records.

In September 2016, Carter's song, "No Mercy", debuted as the theme song for Skip and Shannon: Undisputed, a sports talk show on FS1. On Christmas Day 2017, Carter released the mixtape Dedication 6, the sixth installment of the "Gangsta Grillz" chronology. The second part was released on January 26, 2018.

Tha Carter V was finally released on September 27, 2018, the day of Carter's 36th birthday, debuting at number one on the U.S. Billboard 200 with 480,000 album-equivalent units, including 140,000 pure album sales. It is the second-largest streaming week for an album behind former Young Money labelmate Drake's Scorpion with 433 million streams. It is also Carter's fourth number-one Billboard 200 album. Every song on the album charted on the Billboard 100, while simultaneously charting 4 songs in the top 10, also becoming the first artist to debut two songs in the top five. One of the album's singles, "Uproar", produced by Swizz Beatz, was its leading, reaching number seven on the Billboard Hot 100; it features a sample from rapper G. Dep's 2001 single, "Special Delivery". Tha Carter V has since been certified 2× platinum by the RIAA.

=== 2020–2021: Funeral and Trust Fund Babies ===
While Carter was working on Tha Carter V, it was announced that his next album would be titled Funeral. On January 23, 2020, he revealed the album's release date and album artwork. Funeral was released on January 31, and debuted at number one on the U.S. Billboard 200, with 139,000 album-equivalent units, becoming his fifth U.S. number-one album. The album received generally mixed-to-positive reviews from music critics. On February 2, 2020, Lil Wayne competed in season three of The Masked Singer after the Super Bowl LIV as "Robot". He was the first to be eliminated. Carter featured on Lil Baby's track "Forever", a track from Baby's second studio album, My Turn, which was released on February 28, 2020. The song's music video was released on March 3, 2020. This marked the second collaboration for the two artists in 2020, with the first being on Carter's single, "I Do It".

On April 24, 2020, Lil Wayne, along with Litt Live (formerly at the time, Dash Radio), launched his own radio show, Young Money Radio, on Apple Music through its subdivision Apple Music 1. Wayne described the show as having "heavyweights calling in discussing sports, music, comedy, everything!". On July 3, Lil Wayne released his eleventh studio album, Free Weezy Album (2015) on streaming services to commemorate its five-year anniversary. The album charted at number 77 on the Billboard 200 the following week. On May 29, Wayne released the deluxe edition of Funeral featuring artists such as Doja Cat, Tory Lanez, Lil Uzi Vert, Benny The Butcher, Conway the Machine and Jessie Reyez. On August 28, Wayne released another old project, his 2009 mixtape No Ceilings, for commercial release. He also celebrated the release by collaborating with ASAP Ferg on the song "No Ceilings". Wayne was featured on YoungBoy Never Broke Again's album Top on the track "My Window", released on September 11. His verse received praise from critics. On September 25, he released the deluxe edition of his twelfth album Tha Carter V, to celebrate the album's second anniversary; it consists of songs that did not make the cut on the original album.

On November 27, 2020, Lil Wayne released the mixtape, No Ceilings 3, while announcing the album, I Am Not a Human Being III, for 2021, although it would not be released that year due to delays. On October 1, 2021, Wayne and Rich the Kid released a collaborative mixtape titled Trust Fund Babies, along with a music video for the single "Feelin' Like Tunechi". The mixtape took roughly a month and a half to record. On their working relationship, Wayne said, "For me, it's the chemistry, it's the camaraderie because first of all, Rich like my little bro and me and Rich been rockin' for a minute".

=== 2023–present: Welcome 2 Collegrove and Tha Carter VI ===
On March 31, 2023, Wayne dropped his first ever greatest hits album titled I Am Music. It included the then-unreleased "Kant Nobody", featuring DMX, whose song, "Niggaz Done Started Something" (1998), was sampled through. Wayne and DMX previously collaborated on "Dogs Out", a track from the latter's posthumous album, Exodus, which was released a month after his death in 2021. Wayne released a single titled "Kat Food" on September 1, 2023. That October, Lil Wayne released a mixtape, Tha Fix Before Tha VI. On November 3, 2023, Wayne was featured on the remix to Ciara and Chris Brown's single "How We Roll". That same month, he and 2 Chainz released a collaborative album, Welcome 2 Collegrove. A sequel to 2 Chainz's 2016 album, ColleGrove, Wayne was credited as a co-leading artist as he was previously unable to receive credit for its predecessor, due to his prior legal issues involving his Cash Money dispute.

On February 6, 2025, during an advert for Cetaphil, Wayne announced that Tha Carter VI would be released on June 6, 2025. On February 17, after being critical of his "Mona Lisa" collaborator Kendrick Lamar replacing him as the headliner of the Super Bowl LIX halftime show, Carter performed for the Saturday Night Live 50th anniversary special.

=== Future and unreleased projects ===
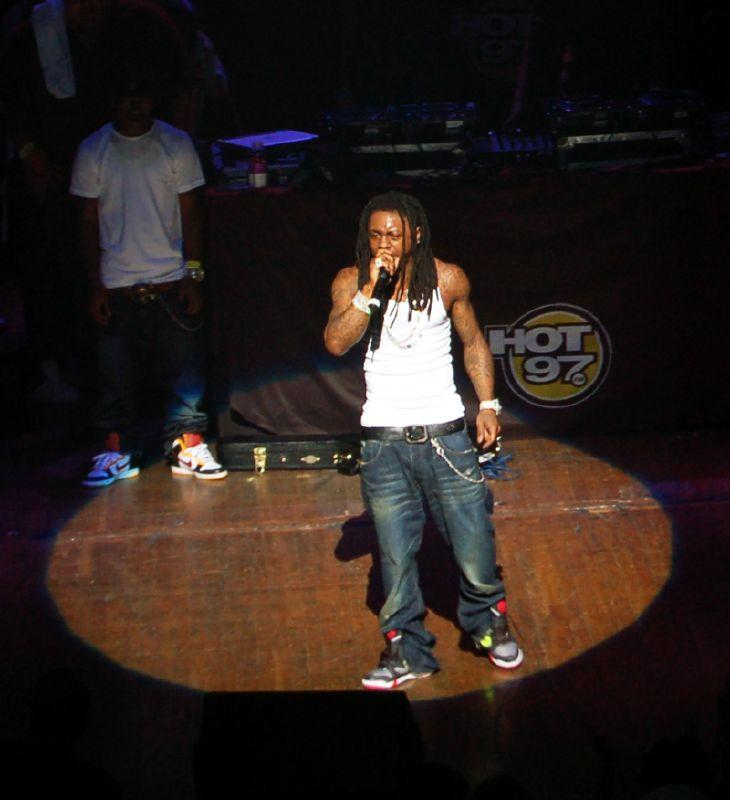
Carter at Beacon Theatre in 2007

Carter has announced several possible upcoming projects, including a collaborative album entitled I Can't Feel My Face with Harlem-based rapper Juelz Santana, that has been in production for several years. In late 2011, it was announced by Mack Maine that Carter and Juelz Santana had gone back to work on their collaborative album I Can't Feel My Face, which had been delayed for a few years due to "label politics".

On June 19, 2008, Carter and T-Pain formed a duo called T-Wayne with plans to release an album, titled He Raps, He Sings; however, those plans have died down due to much of the material recorded for the album being leaked. T-Pain ultimately released T-Wayne as a mixtape in 2017.

According to an interview with Drake, in the December 2011 issue of XXL, plans for an upcoming album with Carter had been scrapped for the time being because of the Jay-Z and Kanye West collaboration album Watch the Throne (2011).

In April 2012, on the premiere of MTV's Hip Hop POV, Carter sat down with Amanda Seales and spoke briefly about an album he put together titled Devol (loved, backwards), an album full of "love songs" that he wrote during his imprisonment at Rikers Island. In May 2013, he confirmed the album will still be released.

Carter's once ongoing litigation with Cash Money prevented numerous completed projects from being released. In January 2017, Young Money revealed the title of a planned Carter album called Velvet. The album ended up leaking online in November 2018.

== Musical style and artistry ==
Carter is known for his creative lyrical ability—which often uses punchlines, homonyms, word play, and braggadocio. His music often deals with the subjects of wealth, drugs, and sex. His lyrics have been criticized for their controversial subject matter.

Carter has cited rapper Missy Elliott as his biggest musical inspiration, saying, "she's a huge influence of everything I've ever done". Another one of his major influences is American hip-hop group Goodie Mob. In an interview with Genius, Carter said, "I've been listening to Goodie Mob since I was in the 7th grade". For his MTV Unplugged special, Carter paid tribute to Tupac by covering his music. He also pulled inspiration from Tupac's "Keep Ya Head Up" for his 2011 single "How to Love".

Additionally, he has mentioned T-Pain, Prince, Wyclef Jean, Lauryn Hill, Erykah Badu, Alicia Keys, and Lenny Kravitz as influences, stating, "I viewed them seriously and was like, 'Wow, I could do that without being totally them.'" Carter and rapper Calboy paid homage to Hill on their 2021 single "Miseducation" titled after Hill's 1998 album The Miseducation of Lauryn Hill.

According to American Songwriter, Carter credits Jay-Z for inspiring him to freestyle rhymes while recording over an instrumental, as opposed to writing down his lyrics. Carter also credits The Notorious B.I.G. as an influence.

In the documentary "The Carter", Carter became known for recording music every day. He has confirmed this in interviews after the documentary release, and has also been confirmed by other people in his orbit.

== Legacy ==
Lil Wayne is often described as "one of the most influential artists in the 21st century" and is many times called "the greatest rapper of his generation" as well as one of the greatest rappers of all time. His musical style and usage of autotune influenced modern sound of hip-hop music and its subgenres, especially the development of trap.

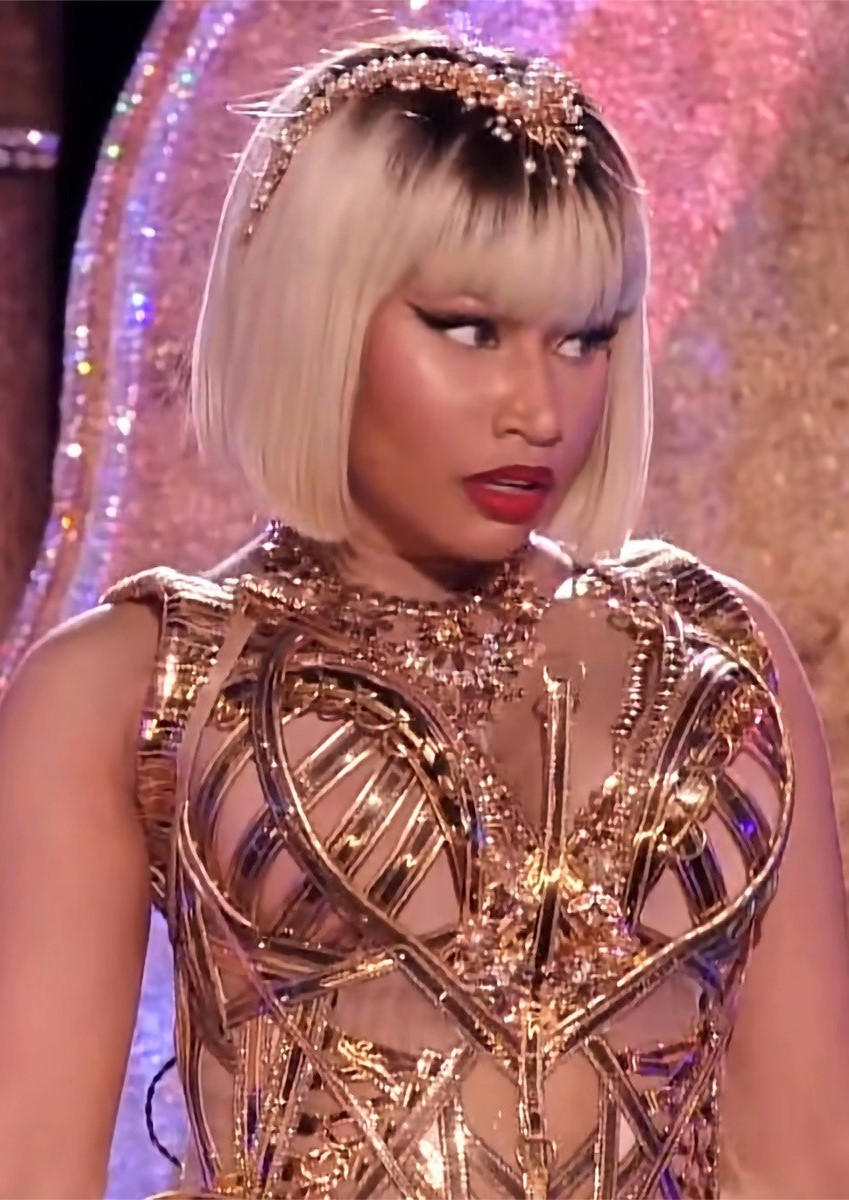
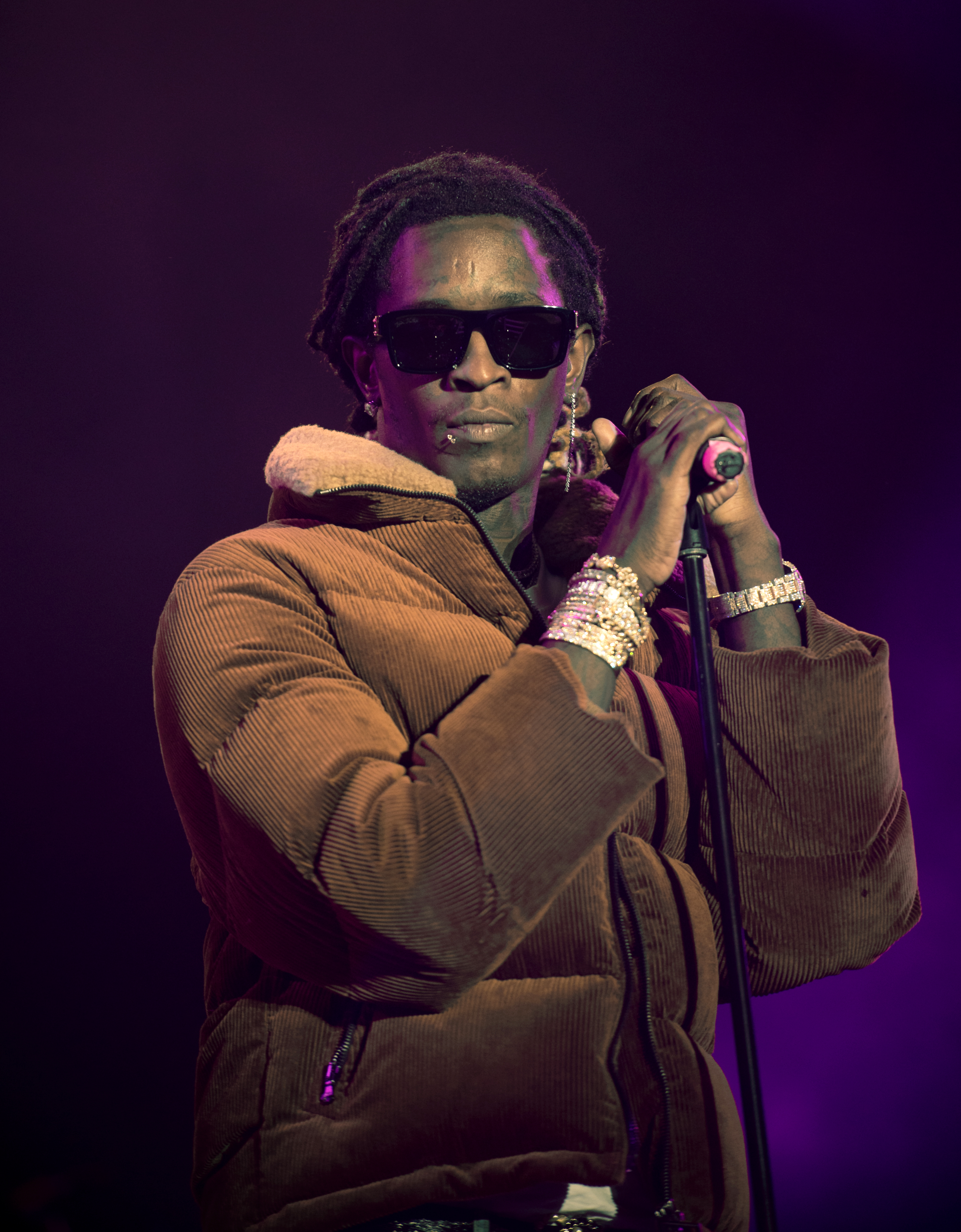
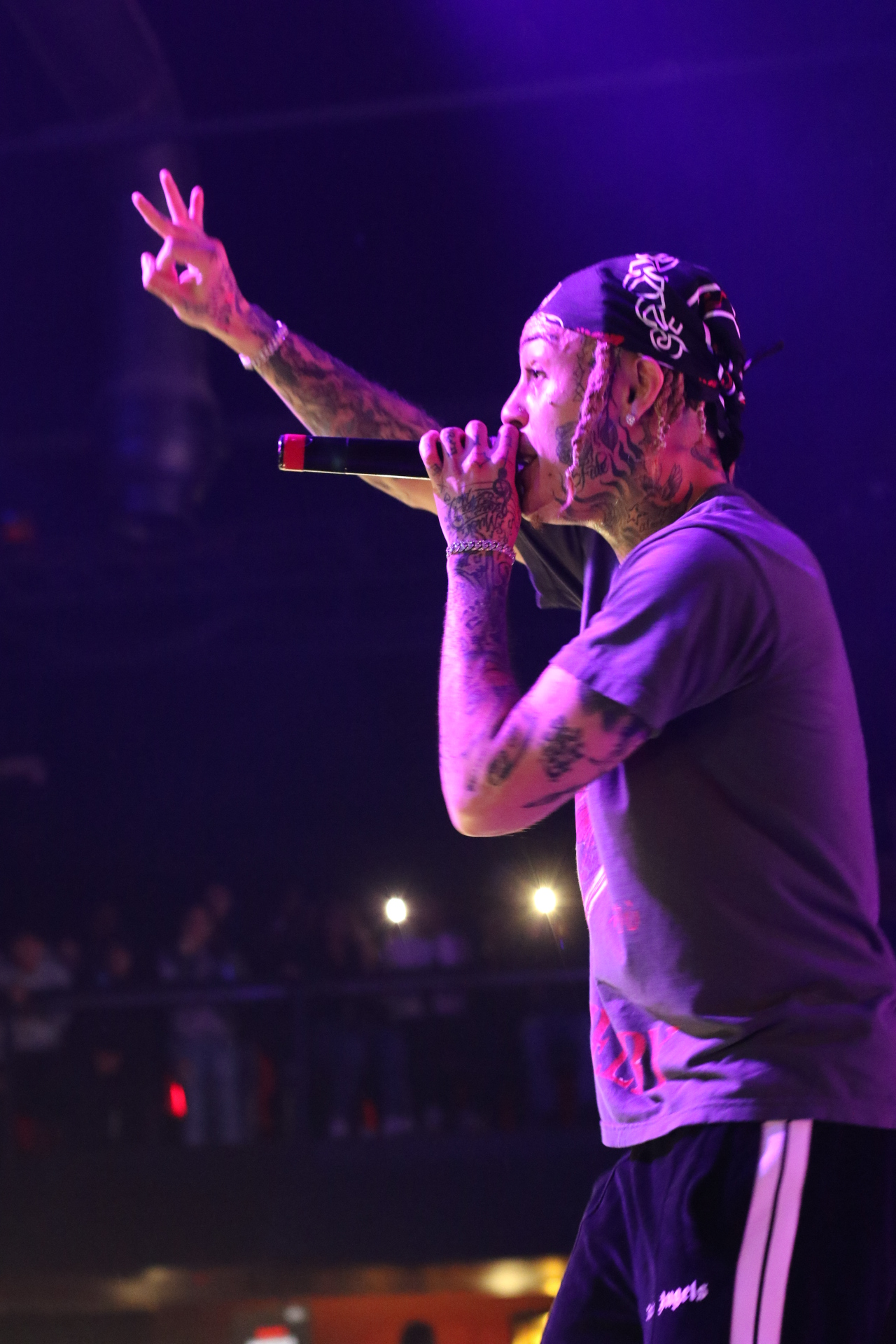
Artists like Nicki Minaj, Young Thug and Lil Skies have often mentioned Lil Wayne as their musical role model and inspiration.

Many rappers and musicians have cited Lil Wayne as an influence on their careers and musical style, including Nicki Minaj, Drake, Fall Out Boy, Kendrick Lamar, 2 Chainz, Tyga, Future, Lil B, Young Thug, Trippie Redd, Lil Skies, Playboi Carti, YoungBoy Never Broke Again, Lil Baby, DaBaby, Polo G, BlocBoy JB, NLE Choppa, Flo Milli, and The Kid Laroi.

In November 2024, during the Lil WeezyAna Fest, Lil Wayne received a Key to the City from New Orleans Mayor LaToya Cantrell. In the same tribute, Master P announced the creation of the NOLA Walk of Fame and presented Wayne with a fleur-de-lis plaque to mark this honor. Additionally, February 6–7 will now be celebrated as "Lil Wayne Day" in New Orleans.

== Personal life ==
=== Relationships and children ===
==== Children ====
Carter has four children. His first child, daughter Reginae, was born November 29, 1998, when he was 16, to his high school sweetheart and later ex-wife Toya Johnson. Internet rumors circulated in August 2008 that Carter's daughter had died in an auto accident; he immediately dispelled them. His second child, son Dwayne III, was born on October 22, 2008, at The Christ Hospital in Cincinnati to former radio personality Sarah Vivan. His third child, son Kameron, was born to actress Lauren London on September 9, 2009. His fourth child, son Neal, was born on November 30, 2009, to singer Nivea.

Carter's son, Neal Carter, currently performs music under the alias Lil Novi.

==== Toya Johnson-Rushing ====
Carter met his high school sweetheart, Toya Johnson, when he and she were 15 and 14 respectively. After dating on and off for seven years, they married on Valentine's Day, February 14, 2004, and divorced in January 2006. Johnson cited her inability to cope with his lifestyle and the fact he had communicated with his other former romantic partners prior. More specifically, his career kept him away from their home for long periods of time. Despite being divorced, the two have remained good friends and continued to jointly support their daughter, Reginae.

==== Lauren London ====
Previously having known each other since 1999, Carter and Lauren London reconciled following his divorce from Johnson in 2006. They broke up again in 2009 after London found out that she was pregnant at the same time as Carter's ex-girlfriend, Nivea. In a May 2011 radio interview, London said of her relationship with Wayne and his fatherhood, "I met Wayne when I was 15 years old. I've known him a very long time, and we were in a relationship that didn't make it. We tried more than once to revive it, and we were engaged briefly years ago, but we eventually parted ways. People see the 'Lil Wayne' personality and think they know who he really is. My son's father is an intelligent, loving, and lovable person who will always be a dear friend. And that will never change. That is all." On the 500 Degreez track "Young'n Blues", Carter discussed his breakup with Toya Johnson and his issues with London, while he nicknamed the latter "Young Cali Sweet Thing".

==== Nivea ====
In February 2002, after he first broke up with Johnson, Carter began dating singer Nivea. On the 2007 song "Something You Forgot", he explained his feelings for Nivea, whom he got engaged to in December 2002 but broke off the engagement with in August 2003. Nivea stated that Carter tried to make her quit doing music so that he could take care of her, but she also acknowledged that the song was written about her.

Carter and Nivea reconciled in early 2008 following the latter's divorce from singer-songwriter The-Dream. Both were re-engaged in 2009, but Nivea decided to end her relationship with Carter while pregnant with their son; they called off their engagement for the second time in June 2010, during Carter's prison sentence.

==== Trina ====
Carter began dating rapper Trina in 2005 after featuring on her single "Don't Trip". The two were discussing future plans for engagement and moving to Florida to live together. However, in 2006, after Trina suffered a miscarriage from what was later confirmed to be her and Carter's unborn child, they grew distant from one another. It was during that time when Trina developed an affair with Carter's would be rival, rapper Young Buck. In October 2007, the relationship ended. According to her, it was the cause of the pair "being young and not knowing what [we were] doing". The two reunited to collaborate for the 2013 single "Wowzerz" and 2019's "Situation". They remain on good terms.

==== Other encounters ====
Carter dated model Karrine Steffans (on and off) from 2007 to 2014. He entered into an intimate relationship with glamour model Tammy Torres from 2009 to 2010. While imprisoned, Drake encouraged him not to rekindle his relationship with Torres due to the pair having an encounter. This was echoed by Kendrick Lamar on the diss track, "Not Like Us" (2024), released during the height of the Drake–Kendrick Lamar feud. After ending his relationship with Torres and settling his issues with Drake, Carter later got involved with Dhea Sodano from 2011 to 2013. He briefly dated Dana Lee in 2012.

In July 2014, it was rumored that Carter was dating singer Christina Milian, with whom he attended the ESPY Awards. They later confirmed their relationship in mid-2015, after which they received criticism from their interconnected exes, singer Nivea and songwriter The-Dream. Due to Carter's past infidelity impacting their relationship, they split in August 2015, having collaborated on multiple singles, videos, and concert dates.

Wayne was engaged to model La'Tecia Thomas, but they called off the engagement in May 2020. A month later, it was announced that Wayne had started dating Denise Bidot, another model. In November 2020, they reportedly broke up over Wayne's endorsement of Donald Trump. Shortly after, it was reported that the couple had reconciled. Wayne and Bidot later broke up again in January 2022.

On October 18, 2024, Carter began dating chef LeahAngelie Murphy. On September 28, 2026, Carter announced the engagement to social media model Madi Cannon.

=== Beliefs and interests ===
In an interview with Blender, Carter said that one of his favorite bands from childhood was rock group Nirvana; he cites them as a major influence in his music.

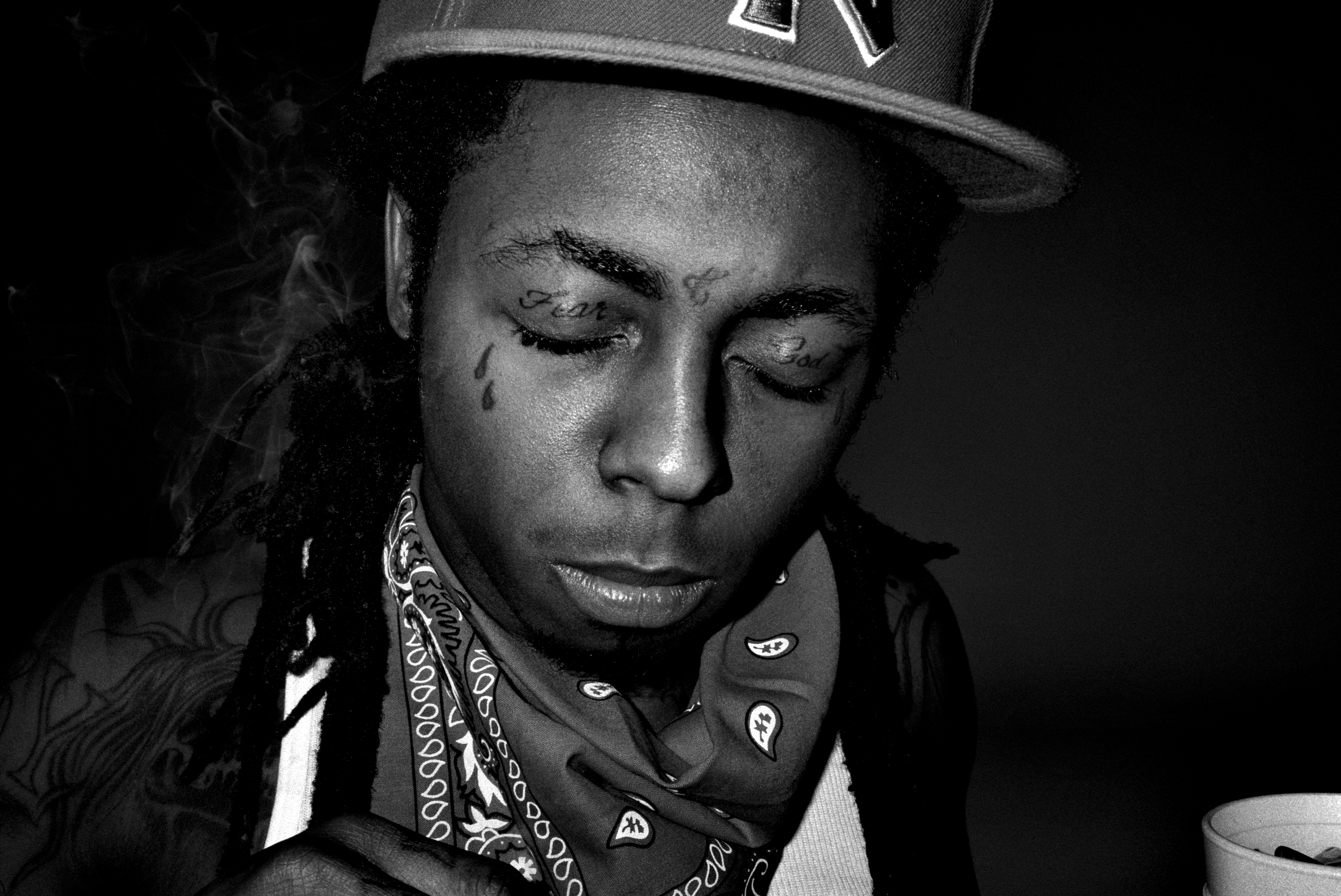
Carter in 2006

Carter got his first tattoo, of his father's name, at age 14. His second spelled "Cash Money" across his stomach. His tattoos have grown to include a Jay-Z verse on his leg, "I Am Music" on his forehead and teardrops on his cheeks among many others. His most recent one is "Baked" on his forehead stylized as the Baker Skateboards logo.

Carter identifies as a Catholic. While playing in Newark Symphony Hall, Carter professed his belief "in God and His son, Jesus". During his 2011 tour in Australia with Eminem, before beginning his bracket, he proclaimed his belief in God.

After earning his GED, Carter enrolled at the University of Houston in January 2005. He dropped out in the same year due to his conflicting schedule. He also stated on The View that he switched to the University of Phoenix and majored in psychology taking online courses. An article in Urb magazine in March 2007 asserted that Carter had been earning high grades at Houston.

In 2016, Carter purchased Player's Rep. Sports Agency, and became Young Money APAA Sports, which hired the NFL's first female sports agent, Nicole Lynn. She currently represents Seth Roberts, Corey Nelson, Jordan Evans, Malik Jefferson, Erik Harris, Quinnen Williams, as well as NCAA coaches, and two former No. 1 Pro Softball draft picks.

On October 29, 2020, less than a week before the presidential election, Carter posted an image of him and President Donald Trump to Twitter. In the caption for the photo, Carter stated that he and Trump had recently met to discuss criminal justice reform and Trump's Platinum Plan, an initiative which aims to raise access to capital in Black communities by almost $500 billion. Carter claimed Trump "listened to what we had to say today and assured he will and can get it done".

=== Health problems ===
On October 25, 2012, Carter's private jet, bound for Los Angeles, made an emergency landing in Texas due to an in-flight medical episode. Lil Wayne was transferred to a local hospital upon arrival. TMZ and other media sources said that Carter had suffered a seizure aboard the plane. His publicist denied this, saying that he was in fact treated for "a severe migraine and dehydration".

The following day, while flying from Texas to Los Angeles, Carter's private jet was reportedly again forced to make an emergency landing, this time in Louisiana, after he suffered a second seizure and required further hospitalization. His representative said that the reports of Carter's condition had been exaggerated, and that he was resting at his Louisiana home. In a November 2012 interview with MTV, Carter stated that he was taking seizure medication, on doctors' orders, due to the aforementioned incidents.

On March 14, 2013, TMZ reported that Carter had been treated at Cedars-Sinai Medical Center in Los Angeles on the evening of March 12, after having seizures while on a music video set with Young Money rapper Nicki Minaj. He was reportedly released in the early hours of March 13. On March 15, TMZ published a second story, claiming that hours after his release on March 13, Carter was found unconscious after experiencing further seizures, and was brought back to Cedars-Sinai, where he was admitted to the intensive care unit in critical condition. The article alleged the latest seizures were found to be linked to high amounts of codeine in Carter's system, possibly due to bingeing on purple drank after his initial hospital release. Multiple celebrities, including Drake and Birdman, were photographed on March 15 and 16 visiting Carter at Cedars-Sinai.

Several members of Young Money Entertainment, including president Mack Maine, criticized media reports on Carter's hospitalization, particularly those of TMZ, alleging that they exaggerated the severity of his condition and falsely implied that he was on his deathbed (such as by saying that he was in a medically induced coma), triggering what the Washington Post called "the most overheated celebrity deathwatch in recent years". In separate interviews on March 18, Mack Maine and Birdman disputed TMZ's reports; they stated that in fact there were not multiple seizures or multiple hospital visits. They explained that after Carter began seizing on the way to the music video shoot on March 12, an ambulance was called and he was transported to the hospital, where he was admitted and remained continuously thereafter. They also refuted the claims that Carter's seizures are drug-induced, saying that they are an ongoing problem for which doctors have been unable to identify a cause.

Carter was released from the hospital late on March 18, following a six-day stay. He addressed his condition via a vlog, on March 21 saying he was "more than good".

Carter had two seizures in June 2016 during a cross-country flight from Wisconsin to California, causing the plane to divert to Omaha, Nebraska. The second seizure occurred just two minutes after takeoff, forcing the plane to land in Omaha once again. Less than a month later, he had another seizure, supposedly due to his not taking his epilepsy medication.

Carter canceled a Las Vegas show on September 3, 2017, after experiencing a seizure in a Chicago hospital earlier that day. He was taken there after being found unconscious in a hotel room.

In June 2023, Carter acknowledged that he now had trouble remembering his songs due to memory problems caused by his epilepsy.

=== Philanthropy ===
On February 19, 2008, Carter and his manager, Cortez Bryant, revisited their alma mater, McMain Secondary School, to recruit students to design an invitation to the gala introducing Carter's nonprofit One Family Foundation.

== Other ventures ==
=== Books ===
Carter wrote a memoir of his experience in Rikers Island called Gone Til' November: A Journal of Rikers Island that was released October 11, 2016.

=== Cannabis industry ===
In December 2019, Carter announced his own cannabis brand under the name GKUA Ultra Premium.

=== Sports media ===
On September 24, 2008, Carter published his first blog for ESPN in their issue, ESPN The Magazine. Carter said that he was a fan of tennis, the Green Bay Packers, the Boston Bruins, the Los Angeles Lakers and the Boston Red Sox. To commemorate the Packers' appearance in Super Bowl XLV, he parodied Wiz Khalifa's hit song "Black and Yellow" (which were the colors of the Packers' opponents, the Pittsburgh Steelers) in 2021 with a song titled "Green and Yellow". He released a second version of the song later that year, which was requested by the Packers and updated with the current roster. Carter has continued writing for ESPN, notably reporting at the ESPN Super Bowl party.

On January 6, 2009, Carter was a guest debater against Skip Bayless on the "1st & 10" segment of ESPN First Take. On February 10, 2009, he appeared on ESPN's Around the Horn and beat out veterans Woody Paige, Jay Mariotti and fellow New Orleanian Michael Smith to win that show's episode.

Carter made his debut on ESPN's daily sports round table show Around The Horn on February 10, 2009. Carter created the intro song "No Mercy" for the Fox Sports 1 sports debate show Undisputed. After Shannon Sharpe's departure from the show, Carter created a new theme song for Undisputed: "Good Morning". Carter also joined the series as a regular guest opposite Bayless.

Carter has mentioned being a fan of Latvian tennis player Jeļena Ostapenko. He was extended an invite to the 2024 US Open. Carter also thanked Ostapenko, who attended Drake's tour featuring Lil Wayne.

== Legal issues ==
=== Arrests, incarceration, and presidential pardon ===
On July 22, 2007, Carter was arrested in New York City following a performance at the Beacon Theatre; the New York City Police Department discovered Carter and another man smoking marijuana near a tour bus. After taking Carter into custody, police discovered a .40 caliber pistol near his person. The gun, which was registered to his manager, was in a bag located near the rapper. He was charged with criminal possession of a weapon and marijuana.

Following a performance at Qwest Arena in Boise, Idaho, Carter was arrested October 5, 2007, on felony fugitive charges after Georgia authorities accused the rapper of possessing a controlled substance. The incident was later described as a "mix-up" and the fugitive charges were dropped.

On January 23, 2008, Carter was arrested alongside two others. His tour bus was stopped by Border Patrol agents near Yuma, Arizona. A K-9 Unit recovered 105 grams (3.7 oz) of marijuana, almost 29 grams (1.0 oz) of cocaine, 41 grams (1.4 oz) of ecstasy, and $22,000 in cash. Carter was charged with four felonies: possession of narcotic drug for sale, possession of dangerous drugs, misconduct involving weapons, and possession of drug paraphernalia. He was granted permission to travel outside of the state and remain out of custody on the $10,185 bond he posted.

On May 6, 2008, Carter returned to court in Arizona to plead not guilty to the charges. A bench warrant was issued on March 17, 2010, when Carter did not show for a final trial management conference. However, he was already incarcerated, serving a one-year sentence on Rikers Island on weapons charges. On June 22, 2010, Carter pleaded guilty to the charges. As part of the plea deal he was able to serve 36 months of probation, to which he was sentenced on June 30, 2010.

On December 18, 2009, Carter and 11 others were detained at the Falfurrias, Texas, border patrol checkpoint after an unknown amount of marijuana was found on two of his tour buses.

On October 22, 2009, Carter pleaded guilty to attempted criminal possession of a weapon. He was due for sentencing in February 2010 and was expected to receive a one-year county jail sentence, but on February 9, 2010, Carter's attorney announced that the sentencing was delayed until March 2 due to dental surgery, which was performed on February 16. The surgery included eight root canals, the replacement of several tooth implants, as well as the addition of a few new implants and work on his remaining original teeth. On March 2, 2010, sentencing was postponed again when the courthouse reported a fire in its basement.

On March 8, 2010, Carter was given a one-year sentence, which he served on Rikers Island. His lawyer said the rapper expected to be held in protective custody, separated from other prisoners. In May 2010, Carter was found by Rikers Island correctional staff to be in possession of contraband (an MP3 player, charger, and headphones). In April 2010, Carter's friends created a website called Weezy Thanx You, which published letters written by Carter while incarcerated. In the first letter, titled "Gone 'til November", Carter said he was staying in good spirits thinking about his children and spending his time working out regularly and reading the Bible every day. Carter was released from Rikers Island Jail on November 4, 2010, after serving eight months of his year-long sentence.

On December 12, 2020, Carter pleaded guilty to a federal firearms charge brought against him by the U.S. Attorney for the Southern District of Florida. This plea stemmed from an incident during December of the previous year, when Carter was arrested in Florida after transporting a loaded handgun on his private jet from California. As a convicted felon, he is barred from possessing such weapons. He was pardoned by U.S. President Donald Trump on January 19, 2021, his last full day in office before the end of his first term.

=== Lawsuits ===
On July 24, 2008, Abkco Music filed a lawsuit against Carter for copyright infringement and unfair competition, specifically referring to Tha Carter III's track "Playing with Fire". In the lawsuit, Abkco says that the song was obviously derived from the Rolling Stones' "Play with Fire", to which Abkco owns the rights. Subsequently, "Playing with Fire" was removed from the track list of Tha Carter III on all online music stores and replaced with the David Banner produced track, "Pussy Monster".

In February 2009, production company RMF Productions filed a $1.3 million lawsuit against Carter following a $100,000 advance payment for three shows, all of which were cancelled by the artist.

In October 2009, Carter, Birdman, Cash Money Records, and various music distribution outlets were sued for copyright infringement by Thomas Marasciullo, who says his voice was used without permission. The rappers asked him to record some "Italian-styled spoken word recordings" in 2006. The lyrics were allegedly used on "Respect" and other tracks from the rappers' collaboration album Like Father, Like Son and Birdman's 5 * Stunna.

In March 2011, producer Deezle (Darius Harrison) sued Carter and his parent labels Cash Money Records over unpaid royalties from Tha Carter III. Two months later, that May, producer Bangladesh also filed a lawsuit against Wayne over unpaid royalties as well.

In early June 2011, another producer named David Kirkwood filed a lawsuit against Young Money Entertainment and Cash Money Records on claims that the labels have failed to pay him over $1.5 million in royalties and production services for his work on the album, also including his songwriting on "Love Me or Hate Me", a bonus song featured only on the deluxe edition of the album.

Also in June 2011, Dallas producers Play-N-Skillz filed a lawsuit against him, saying Carter owes them at least $1 million in unpaid royalties for "Got Money" from his album Tha Carter III. The single has sold over 2 million copies since being released.

In July 2011, Done Deal Enterprises, a production company based in Georgia, filed suit against Carter, Universal Music Group, Cash Money Records and Young Money Entertainment, claiming copyright infringement. The lawsuit alleges Carter stole the song "BedRock", featured on the compilation album We Are Young Money, and seeks damages of $15 million.

In November 2012, Wayne was ordered to pay Quincy Jones III $2.2 million based on a lawsuit which stated that the rapper blocked the release of Jones's film The Carter, therefore infringing on its profits.

== Controversies and feuds ==
=== Juvenile ===
Carter began feuding with former Hot Boys member and Cash Money Records labelmate Juvenile in 2002 after he took offense to Carter naming his third studio album 500 Degreez—a diss aimed towards Juvenile, whose previous album was named 400 Degreez. Juvenile responded with a diss track on his 2002 album 600 Degreez, titled "A Hoe". In the song, Juvenile questions Carter's sexuality and calls him a fake gangster. The two squashed their rivalry for a short period in 2004, with Carter and Birdman appearing in the music video for Juvenile and Soulja Slim's song "Slow Motion". Carter later paid tribute to the Hot Boys with a song called "I Miss My Dawgs" on 2004's Tha Carter. Juvenile responded by labeling the song "fake" and criticizing Carter for releasing a tribute song and later promoting the album on BET with "nothing good to say about them". The two eventually reconciled once again, and Juvenile re-signed with Cash Money Records in 2014.

=== Young Buck ===
Young Buck released a song called "Off Parole", featuring Tony Yayo, which insulted Carter. Young Buck said that Carter could not be angry because Buck spoke the truth. Young Buck also said "You think you got a problem with Juve and B.G.; you'll have a true problem with me", referring to the Cash Money-Juvenile/B.G feud. One of the reasons 50 Cent stated he was dismissing Young Buck was what he called "inconsistent behavior", which included appearing on stage with Carter, then seemingly dissing him on records with G-Unit. After he was dismissed, Young Buck appeared in the music video "My Life" by The Game, which featured Carter on the song's chorus. As of 2009, Young Buck and Carter have reconciled and also linked up to record a track "Up's and Down's" for Young Buck's Back on My Buck Shit mixtape.

=== Pusha T ===
Tension between Wayne and Pusha T had been going on for years, beginning soon after Clipse and Birdman worked on "What Happened to That Boy", the latter's 2002 single. In 2006, Wayne felt the Clipse song "Mr. Me Too" was directed at him, which caused more tension between the two. In 2012, after much speculation that Pusha T was subliminally dissing Canadian rapper and Wayne's Young Money signee Drake in several songs, the speculation heightened after the release of Pusha T's "Exodus 23:1" song. Lil Wayne quickly responded on online social networking service Twitter and later released a diss track titled "Goulish". In the first verse, Wayne raps "Fuck Pusha T and anybody that love him / His head up his ass, I'mma have to head-butt him". Pusha T called Wayne's diss track "horrible" and said he felt it did not deserve a response. Both men have downplayed the feud, with Wayne saying he's over it. However, in November 2012, Pusha T dissed Wayne and Birdman on a Ludacris song titled "Tell Me What They Mad For". In December 2014, once the feud between Lil Wayne and Birdman arose, Pusha T sent out a tweet encouraging Lil Wayne to sign to G.O.O.D. Music, which also insulted Birdman for his hand-rubbing habit.

=== Jay-Z ===
In a 2009 interview with Tropical TV, Birdman disputed the MTV poll that voted Jay-Z "The Hottest MC in the Game", stating that Lil Wayne was a better rapper and made more money. In early 2011, when Jay-Z and Kanye West's single "H•A•M" was released, Jay-Z took shots at Birdman, saying "Really, you got Baby money" and "[you] ain't got my lady's money!". On August 24, 2011, a song called "It's Good" by Lil Wayne (featuring Drake and Jadakiss) was leaked online and included Lil Wayne responding "Talkin' 'bout baby money? I gotcha baby money. Kidnap your bitch, get that, How much you love your lady? money". Jadakiss later absolved himself of involvement in any brewing beef on his official Twitter feed.

=== Dispute with Cash Money Records ===
On December 4, 2014, just five days before Tha Carter V was due to be released, Carter issued a statement saying the album would not be released on its expected release date, due to his displeasure with Cash Money Records label-boss Birdman, refusing to release the album although it had been completed. Carter also expressed his feelings by stating he felt both he and his creativity were being held "prisoner".

Upon Sorry for the Wait 2's release on January 20, 2015, he continuously disses Birdman and Cash Money Records, several times throughout the mixtape. Birdman was reported to be upset with this. In late January 2015, Carter sued Birdman and Cash Money Records for $51 million. Carter and Birdman supposedly reconciled after being seen at Drake's NYE Party, at Miami's Club Liv, and in studio.

On January 27, 2024, both Carter and Birdman reunited during a studio session, putting an end to their nine-year quarrel.

=== Political and racial views ===
In 2013, Carter received criticism after a video released by TMZ showed him apparently stepping on the U.S. flag. Carter later explained that "It was never my intention to desecrate the flag of the United States", and that he was shooting a video for a song on his upcoming album, "God Bless Amerika". He says the purpose of the flag was to show that "behind the American Flag was the Hoods of America".

In late 2016, Carter made statements critical of the Black Lives Matter movement, saying, "I don't feel connected to a damn thing that ain't got nothin' to do with me. If you do, you crazy as shit," adding that his status as a wealthy black man who has white fans is evidence that black people are valued in the United States. He said in an interview on ABC's Nightline: "I don't know nothing about that, what they're talking about. [...] Don't get mad 'cause I'm rich and I don't see none of that."

== Discography ==
Solo studio albums

- Tha Block Is Hot (1999)
- Lights Out (2000)
- 500 Degreez (2002)
- Tha Carter (2004)
- Tha Carter II (2005)
- Tha Carter III (2008)
- Rebirth (2010)
- I Am Not a Human Being (2010)
- Tha Carter IV (2011)
- I Am Not a Human Being II (2013)
- Free Weezy Album (2015)
- Tha Carter V (2018)
- Funeral (2020)
- Tha Carter VI (2025)

Collaborative studio albums

- Like Father, Like Son (with Birdman) (2006)
- Welcome 2 Collegrove (with 2 Chainz) (2023)

== Tours ==
=== Headlining ===
- I Am Music Tour (2008-2009)
- America's Most Wanted Tour (2009, 2013)
- I Am Music II Tour (2011)
- Sorry For The Wait 2 Tour (2015)
- The Dedication Tour (2016)
- Kloser 2 U Tour (2017)
- I Ain't Shit Without You (2018)
- Welcome To Tha Carter Tour (2023)
- Tha Carter VI Tour (2025)

=== Co-headlining ===
- Cash Money/Ruff Ryders Tour (with Cash Money and Ruff Ryders) (2000)
- Drake vs. Lil Wayne (with Drake) (2014)
- Blink-182 and Lil Wayne Tour (with Blink-182) (2019)
- The HotBoys Reunion Tour (with Juvenile, B.G. and Turk) (2024-2025)

== Filmography ==
=== Film ===
Year	Film	Role	Notes
2000	Baller Blockin'	Iceberg Shorty	
2007	Who's Your Caddy?	Himself	
2009	Hurricane Season	Lamont	
2010	Freaknik: The Musical	Trap Jesus	Voice role
2023	House Party	Himself	Cameo
2026	Travis Barker: Louder Than Fear	Himself	Documentary

=== Television ===
Year	Title	Role	Notes
2004	MTV Cribs	Himself	September 22, 2004
2004	The L-Bow Room	Himself	October 21, 2004
2004	The Late Late Show with Craig Kilborn	Himself	October 29, 2004
2004–2025	Saturday Night Live	Himself, musical guest	3 episodes
2005	The Tonight Show with Jay Leno	Himself	Season 13, Episode 84
2005	Wild 'n Out	Himself, musical guest	Season 1, Episode 7: "Omarion"
2007	The Boondocks	Jericho's son (voice)	Season 2, Episode 9: "Invasion of the Katrinians"
2009	Late Show with David Letterman	Himself	Season 16, Episode 85
2011	America's Best Dance Crew	Himself	Season 6, Episode 1: "Lil Wayne Challenge"
2011	The World According to Paris	Himself	Season 1, Episode 8: "Every Day Is My Birthday"
2012	Loiter Squad	Himself	Season 1, Episode 7: "Episode 7"
2016–present	Skip and Shannon: Undisputed	Himself, musical guest	Theme song performer Episodes 1
2017	Growing Up Hip Hop: Atlanta	Himself	Season 1, Episode 1: "Lil' Trouble in the A"
2020	The Masked Singer	Robot/Himself	Season 3: Eliminated in Episode 1

== See also ==
- List of celebrities who own cannabis businesses
- List of artists who reached number one in the United States
- List of highest-certified music artists in the United States
- List of best-selling singles in the United States
- List of best-selling singles
- List of best-selling albums by year in the United States
- List of artists who reached number one on the UK singles chart
