= Lil Wayne singles discography =

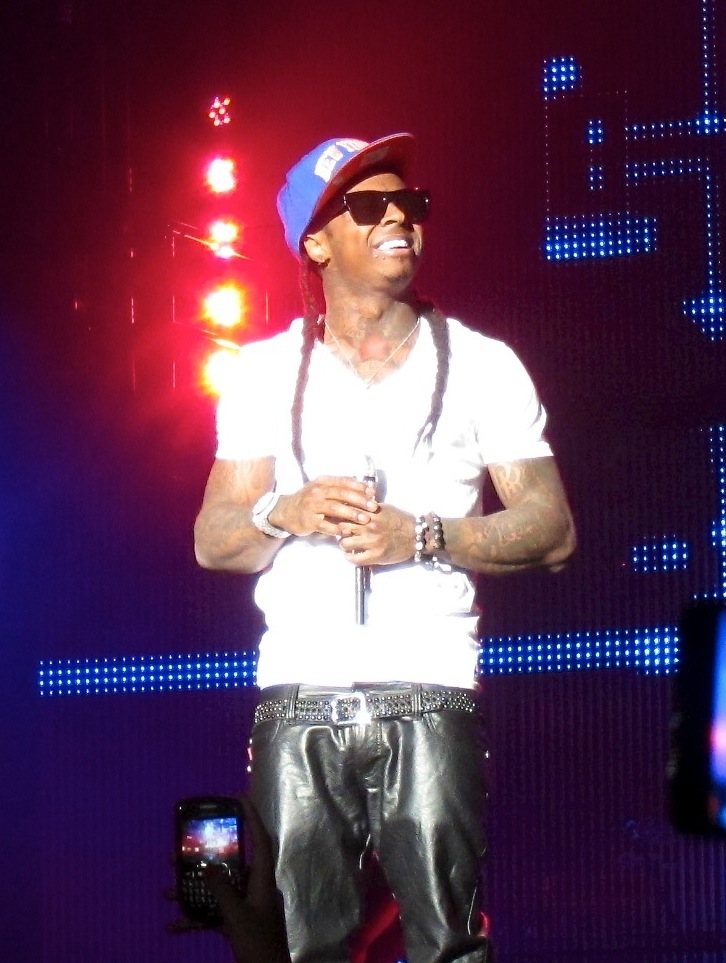
- Lil Wayne performing in Long Island, New York in 2011
- Singles: 286
- Promotional singles: 19

American rapper Lil Wayne has released 286 singles including 19 promotional singles. Lil Wayne attained his first singles chart entry in 1999 as a featured artist on Hot Boys member Juvenile's single "Back That Azz Up", which peaked at number 19 on the United States Billboard Hot 100 and became a top ten hit on the Hot R&B/Hip-Hop Songs and Hot Rap Songs charts. Wayne later released his debut solo studio album Tha Block Is Hot in November 1999. Its title track and lead single, which features B.G. and Juvenile, reached number 72 on the Billboard Hot 100. Lights Out followed in December 2000 and produced the singles "Get Off the Corner", "Everything" and "Shine". "Way of Life", the lead single from Wayne's third studio album 500 Degreez, peaked at number 71 on the Hot 100 and became a top 20 hit on the Hot Rap Songs chart. In 2004, Wayne was featured on the single "Soldier" by American girl group Destiny's Child, which became his first top ten hit on the Hot 100 and enjoyed commercial success internationally.

Lil Wayne's fourth studio album Tha Carter featured the single "Go D.J.", which gave Wayne his first top 20 hit on the Hot 100 as a lead artist and was later certified platinum by the Recording Industry Association of America (RIAA). Tha Carter II followed in December 2005 and produced the platinum-certified singles "Fireman" and "Hustler Musik", which peaked at numbers 32 and 87 respectively on the Hot 100. The album Like Father, Like Son, a collaboration with rapper Birdman, featured four singles – "Stuntin' Like My Daddy", "Leather So Soft", "Know What I'm Doin'" and "You Ain't Know" – all of which entered the Hot R&B/Hip-Hop Songs chart. Wayne's critically acclaimed and commercially successful album Tha Carter III, released in June 2008, produced several hit singles. "Lollipop" became Wayne's first number-one single on the Billboard Hot 100 and was certified Diamond by the RIAA. "A Milli", "Got Money", and "Mrs. Officer" all hit the top 20 on the Hot 100 and attained platinum certifications from the RIAA. Wayne's rap rock album Rebirth was released in early 2010 and featured four singles. During this period, he also guested on a number of top ten hits, including T-Pain's "Can't Believe It", Kevin Rudolf's "Let It Rock", Jay-Z and T.I.'s "Swagga like Us" and Jay Sean's "Down", the latter of which gave Wayne his second number-one single on the Hot 100.

Following a nine-month prison sentence for criminal possession of a weapon, Wayne returned to the music business with the release of the album I Am Not a Human Being in September 2010. "Right Above It", featuring Young Money Entertainment signee Drake, became a top ten hit. Released in September 2011, Wayne's ninth studio album Tha Carter IV featured the Hot 100 top ten hits "6 Foot 7 Foot", "How to Love" and "She Will". Lil Wayne broke American rock and roll singer Elvis Presley's record for the most entries on the Billboard Hot 100 in September 2012, with the debut of Game's "Celebration" – in which he is featured – bringing Wayne's total number of entries on the chart to 109. Wayne released his tenth studio album I Am Not a Human Being II in March 2013; "Love Me" was the most successful of the album's four singles, peaking at number nine on the Hot 100 and selling one million digital copies. The album received mixed reviews from music critics, criticizing Wayne's use of censored words. In 2014, he released the single "Believe Me" featuring Drake. The single was met with acclaim many ranking Wayne's verse to be one of the best of that year, the single certified platinum by the RIAA. Tha Carter V was delayed twice because of his problems with Cash Money. In 2015 he released his 11th studio album Free Weezy Album which was a Tidal exclusive and was not released for sale. The album was promoted by the single "Glory" and received positive reviews.

After many delays, his twelfth album Tha Carter V was released on September 28, 2018.

== As lead artist ==
List of singles as lead artist, with selected chart positions and certifications, showing year released and album name
| Title | Year | Peak chart positions | | | | | | | | | | Certifications | Album |
| Title | Year | US | US R&B/HH | US Rap | AUS | CAN | FRA | IRL | NZ | SWI | UK | Certifications | Album |
|---|---|---|---|---|---|---|---|---|---|---|---|---|---|
| "Tha Block Is Hot" (featuring Juvenile and B.G.) | 1999 | 72 | 24 | 27 | — | — | — | — | — | — | — | | Tha Block Is Hot |
| "Respect Us" (featuring Juvenile) | 2000 | — | — | — | — | — | — | — | — | — | — | | Tha Block Is Hot |
| "Get Off the Corner" | 2000 | — | 88 | — | — | — | — | — | — | — | — | | Lights Out |
| "Hardball" (with Lil' Bow Wow, Lil' Zane and Sammie) | 2001 | — | 68 | — | — | — | — | — | — | — | — | | Hardball (soundtrack) |
| "Everything" | 2001 | — | — (Note: "Everything" did not enter the Hot R&B/Hip-Hop Songs chart, but peaked at number 19 on the Bubbling Under R&B/Hip-Hop Singles chart, which acts as an extension to the R&B/Hip-Hop Songs chart.) | — | — | — | — | — | — | — | — | | Lights Out |
| "Shine" (featuring Birdman, Mickey and Mack 10) | 2001 | 96 | 39 | — | — | — | — | — | — | — | — | | Lights Out |
| "Way of Life" (featuring Big Tymers and TQ) | 2002 | 71 | 23 | 16 | — | — | — | — | — | — | — | | 500 Degreez |
| "Where You At" | 2002 | — | — | — | — | — | — | — | — | — | — | | 500 Degreez |
| "Get Something" (featuring Mannie Fresh) | 2003 | — | 97 | — | — | — | — | — | — | — | — | | Non-album single |
| "Bring It Back" (featuring Mannie Fresh) | 2004 | — | 47 | — | — | — | — | — | — | — | — | | Tha Carter |
| "Go D.J." | 2004 | 14 | 4 | 3 | — | — | — | — | — | — | — | RIAA: 2× Platinum | Tha Carter |
| "Earthquake" (featuring Jazze Pha) | 2004 | — | — (Note: "Earthquake" did not enter the Hot R&B/Hip-Hop Songs chart, but peaked at number 17 on the Bubbling Under R&B/Hip-Hop Singles chart, which acts as an extension to the R&B/Hip-Hop Songs chart.) | — | — | — | — | — | — | — | — | | Tha Carter |
| "Fireman" | 2005 | 32 | 15 | 10 | — | — | — | — | — | — | — | RIAA: 2× Platinum | Tha Carter II |
| "Hustler Musik" | 2006 | 87 | 26 | 16 | — | — | — | — | — | — | — | RIAA: Platinum | Tha Carter II |
| "Shooter" (featuring Robin Thicke) | 2006 | — | 97 | — | — | — | — | — | — | — | — | | Tha Carter II |
| "I'm a D-Boy" (featuring Birdman) | 2006 | — | — (Note: "I'm a D-Boy" did not enter the Hot R&B/Hip-Hop Songs chart, but peaked at number 30 on the Hot R&B/Hip-Hop Singles Sales chart.) | — | — | — | — | — | — | — | — | | Tha Carter II |
| "Stuntin' Like My Daddy" (with Birdman) | 2006 | 21 | 7 | 5 | — | — | — | — | — | — | — | RIAA: Platinum | Like Father, Like Son |
| "Leather So Soft" (with Birdman) | 2006 | — (Note: "Leather So Soft" did not enter the Billboard Hot 100, but peaked at number 18 on the Bubbling Under Hot 100 Singles chart, which acts as an extension to the Hot 100.) | 41 | 16 | — | — | — | — | — | — | — | RIAA: Platinum | Like Father, Like Son |
| "Know What I'm Doin'" (with Birdman, featuring T-Pain and Rick Ross) | 2007 | — | 58 | 22 | — | — | — | — | — | — | — | | Like Father, Like Son |
| "You Ain't Know" (with Birdman) | 2007 | — | 56 | — | — | — | — | — | — | — | — | | Like Father, Like Son |
| "Gossip" | 2007 | — (Note: "Gossip" did not enter the Billboard Hot 100, but peaked at number 15 on the Bubbling Under Hot 100 Singles chart, which acts as an extension to the Hot 100.) | — (Note: "Gossip" did not enter the Hot R&B/Hip-Hop Songs chart, but peaked at number nine on the Bubbling Under R&B/Hip-Hop Singles chart, which acts as an extension to the R&B/Hip-Hop Songs chart.) | — | — | — | — | — | — | — | — | | The Leak |
| "I'm Me" | 2007 | 97 | 63 | — | — | — | — | — | — | — | — | RIAA: Platinum | The Leak |
| "Lollipop" (featuring Static Major) | 2008 | 1 | 1 | 1 | 32 | 10 | 196 | 28 | 3 | 39 | 26 | RIAA: Diamond; RIAA: 5× Platinum (Mastertone); BPI: Platinum; RMNZ: 2× Platinum | Tha Carter III |
| "A Milli" | 2008 | 6 | 1 | 1 | — | 54 | — | — | — | — | 163 | RIAA: 6× Platinum; BPI: Platinum; RMNZ: 2× Platinum | Tha Carter III |
| "Got Money" (featuring T-Pain) | 2008 | 10 | 7 | 2 | — | 30 | — | — | — | — | 184 | RIAA: 3× Platinum | Tha Carter III |
| "Mrs. Officer" (featuring Bobby Valentino and Kidd Kidd) | 2008 | 16 | 5 | 2 | — | — | — | — | 12 | — | 57 | RIAA: 3× Platinum; BPI: Silver; RMNZ: 3× Platinum | Tha Carter III |
| "Prom Queen" | 2009 | 15 | — (Note: "Prom Queen" did not enter the Hot R&B/Hip-Hop Songs chart, but peaked at number 16 on the Bubbling Under R&B/Hip-Hop Singles chart, which acts as an extension to the R&B/Hip-Hop Songs chart.) | — | 93 | 36 | — | — | — | — | 112 | RIAA: Platinum | Rebirth |
| "Hot Revolver" (featuring Dre) | 2009 | 33 | — | — | — | 54 | — | — | — | — | 132 | RIAA: Gold | Non-album single |
| "On Fire" | 2009 | 62 | 54 | 25 | — | — | — | — | — | — | 131 | | Rebirth |
| "Drop the World" (featuring Eminem) | 2009 | 18 | — (Note: "Drop the World" did not enter the Hot R&B/Hip-Hop Songs chart, but peaked at number two on the Bubbling Under R&B/Hip-Hop Singles chart, which acts as an extension to the R&B/Hip-Hop Songs chart.) | — | 56 | 24 | — | 43 | — | — | 51 | RIAA: 5× Platinum; BPI: Gold; RMNZ: Gold | Rebirth |
| "Knockout" (featuring Nicki Minaj) | 2010 | 44 | — | — | — | — | — | — | — | — | — | RIAA: Platinum | Rebirth |
| "I'm Single" | 2010 | 82 | 38 | 23 | — | — | — | — | — | — | — | RIAA: Platinum | I Am Not a Human Being |
| "Right Above It" (featuring Drake) | 2010 | 6 | 4 | 1 | 98 | 34 | — | — | — | — | 37 | RIAA: 4× Platinum; BPI: Silver; RMNZ: Gold | I Am Not a Human Being |
| "6 Foot 7 Foot" (featuring Cory Gunz) | 2010 | 9 | 2 | 2 | — | 50 | — | — | — | — | 71 | RIAA: 7× Platinum; BPI: Silver; RMNZ: Platinum | Tha Carter IV |
| "John" (featuring Rick Ross) | 2011 | 22 | 19 | 12 | — | 90 | — | — | — | — | — | RIAA: 2× Platinum | Tha Carter IV |
| "How to Love" | 2011 | 5 | 2 | 2 | 58 | 20 | 97 | — | 24 | 67 | 48 | RIAA: 6× Platinum; BPI: Silver; RMNZ: Platinum | Tha Carter IV |
| "She Will" (featuring Drake) | 2011 | 3 | 1 | 2 | 78 | 16 | 70 | — | — | — | 58 | RIAA: 4× Platinum; BPI: Gold; RMNZ: Platinum | Tha Carter IV |
| "It's Good" (featuring Jadakiss and Drake) | 2011 | 79 | — | — | — | — | — | — | — | — | — | | Tha Carter IV |
| "Mirror" (featuring Bruno Mars) | 2011 | 16 | 69 | 25 | 26 | 44 | 22 | 21 | 37 | 15 | 17 | RIAA: 4× Platinum; ARIA: Platinum; BPI: Platinum; RMNZ: Platinum | Tha Carter IV |
| "My Homies Still" (featuring Big Sean) | 2012 | 38 | 20 | 16 | — | — | — | — | — | — | — | RIAA: Platinum | I Am Not a Human Being II |
| "No Worries" (featuring Detail) | 2012 | 29 | 7 | 7 | — | — | — | — | — | — | — | RIAA: 2× Platinum | I Am Not a Human Being II |
| "Love Me" (featuring Drake and Future) | 2013 | 9 | 4 | 3 | 92 | 49 | 27 | — | — | 72 | 44 | RIAA: Diamond; BPI: Gold; RMNZ: 2× Platinum | I Am Not a Human Being II |
| "Rich As Fuck" (featuring 2 Chainz) | 2013 | 38 | 11 | 8 | — | — | — | — | — | — | — | RIAA: 3× Platinum | I Am Not a Human Being II |
| "Believe Me" (featuring Drake) | 2014 | 26 | 7 | 2 | — | 97 | — | — | — | — | 36 | RIAA: 2× Platinum | Non-album single |
| "Sucker for Pain" (with Wiz Khalifa, Imagine Dragons, Logic and Ty Dolla $ign featuring X Ambassadors) | 2016 | 15 | 3 | 1 | 7 | 19 | 93 | 84 | 5 | 16 | 11 | RIAA: 3× Platinum; ARIA: Platinum; BPI: Platinum; RMNZ: 3× Platinum; SNEP: Platinum | Suicide Squad: The Album |
| "Changed It" (with Nicki Minaj) | 2017 | 71 | 29 | — | — | — | 116 | — | — | — | — | | Non-album singles |
| "No Frauds" (with Nicki Minaj and Drake) | 2017 | 14 | 8 | 5 | 58 | 25 | 43 | 71 | — | 50 | 49 | ARIA: Platinum; BPI: Silver; MC: Gold; RMNZ: Gold | Non-album singles |
| "Uproar" (featuring Swizz Beatz) | 2018 | 7 | 6 | 6 | 100 | 24 | — | — | — | — | 99 | RIAA: 2× Platinum; MC: Gold; RMNZ: Gold | Tha Carter V |
| "Don't Cry" (featuring XXXTentacion) | 2019 | 5 | 4 | — | 50 | 19 | — | 29 | — | 64 | 28 | RIAA: Platinum | Tha Carter V |
| "Pullin'" (with Fat Joe and Dre) | 2019 | — | — | — | — | — | — | — | — | — | — | | Family Ties |
| "Gimme Brain" (with Travis Barker and Rick Ross) | 2019 | — | — | — | — | — | — | — | — | — | — | | Non-album single |
| "I Do It" (featuring Big Sean and Lil Baby) | 2020 | 33 | 16 | 12 | — | 63 | — | — | — (Note: "I Do It" did not enter the NZ Top 40 Singles Chart, but peaked at number 14 on the NZ Hot Singles Chart.) | — | — | | Funeral |
| "Shimmy" (featuring Doja Cat) | 2020 | — | — | — | — | — | — | — | — | — | — | | Funeral |
| "Gang Gang" (with Polo G) | 2021 | 33 | 13 | 9 | 67 | 34 | — | 42 | — (Note: "Gang Gang" did not enter the NZ Top 40 Singles Chart, but peaked at number seven on the NZ Hot Singles Chart.) | — | 56 | RIAA: Platinum | Hall of Fame |
| "Lose" (with KSI) | 2021 | 86 | 31 | — | 38 | 61 | — | 20 | 35 | — | 18 | | All Over the Place |
| "Lonely" (with DaBaby) | 2021 | 63 | 28 | 23 | — | 86 | — | — | — | — | — | | Non-album single |
| "Feelin' Like Tunechi" (with Rich the Kid) | 2021 | 91 | 40 | — | — | — | — | — | — (Note: "Feelin' Like Tunechi" did not enter the NZ Top 40 Singles Chart, but peaked at number 31 on the NZ Hot Singles Chart.) | — | — | | Trust Fund Babies |
| "Ay!" (with Machine Gun Kelly) | 2022 | 82 | — | — | — | 57 | — | 92 | — (Note: "Ay!" did not enter the NZ Top 40 Singles Chart, but peaked at number seven on the NZ Hot Singles Chart.) | — | 80 | MC: Gold | Mainstream Sellout |
| "Kant Nobody" (featuring DMX) | 2023 | 66 | 23 | 11 | — | — | — | — | — | — | — | | I Am Music |
| "Kat Food" | 2023 | — (Note: "Kat Food" did not enter the Billboard Hot 100, but peaked at number four on the Bubbling Under Hot 100 chart, which acts as an extension to the Hot 100.) | 34 | — | — | — | — | — | — (Note: "Kat Food" did not enter the NZ Top 40 Singles Chart, but peaked at number 22 on the NZ Hot Singles Chart.) | — | — | | Tha Fix Before Tha VI |
| "Main One" (with Mario and Tyga) | 2023 | — | — | — | — | — | — | — | — | — | — | | Non-album single |
| "Brand New" (with Tyga and YG) | 2023 | — (Note: "Brand New" did not enter the Billboard Hot 100, but peaked at number one on the Bubbling Under Hot 100 chart, which acts as an extension to the Hot 100.) | 34 | — | — | — | — | — | — (Note: "Brand New" did not enter the NZ Top 40 Singles Chart, but peaked at number 24 on the NZ Hot Singles Chart.) | — | — | | Hit Me When U Leave the Klub: The Playlist |
| "Presha" (with 2 Chainz) | 2023 | — (Note: "Presha" did not enter the Billboard Hot 100, but peaked at number one on the Bubbling Under Hot 100 chart, which acts as an extension to the Hot 100.) | 32 | — | — | — | — | — | — | — | — | | Welcome 2 Collegrove |
| "Long Story Short" (with 2 Chainz) | 2023 | — (Note: "Long Story Short" did not enter the Billboard Hot 100, but peaked at number six on the Bubbling Under Hot 100 chart, which acts as an extension to the Hot 100.) | 40 | — | — | — | — | — | — | — | — | | Welcome 2 Collegrove |
| "Transparency" (with 2 Chainz) | 2023 | — (Note: "Transparency" did not enter the Billboard Hot 100, but peaked at number three on the Bubbling Under Hot 100 chart, which acts as an extension to the Hot 100.) | 35 | — | — | — | — | — | — | — | — | | Welcome 2 Collegrove |
| "Wassam Baby" (with Rob49) | 2024 | — (Note: "Wassam Baby" did not enter the Billboard Hot 100, but peaked at number 12 on the Bubbling Under Hot 100 chart, which acts as an extension to the Hot 100.) | 47 | — | — | — | — | — | — | — | — | | Non-album singles |
| "Bless" (with Wheezy, featuring Young Thug) | 2024 | — | — | — | — | — | — | — | — | — | — | | Non-album singles |
| "Baby Mad at Me" (with That Mexican OT) | 2025 | — | 37 | — | — | — | — | — | — | — | — | | Non-album singles |
"—" denotes a recording that did not chart or was not released in that territory.

== As featured artist ==
=== 1999–2009 ===
List of singles as featured artist, with selected chart positions and certifications, showing year released and album name
| Title | Year | Peak chart positions | | | | | | | | | | Certifications | Album |
| Title | Year | US | US R&B/HH | US Rap | AUS | CAN | FRA | IRL | NZ | SWI | UK | Certifications | Album |
|---|---|---|---|---|---|---|---|---|---|---|---|---|---|
| "Back That Azz Up" (Juvenile featuring Lil Wayne and Mannie Fresh) | 1999 | 19 | 5 | 9 | — | — | — | — | — | — | — | RIAA: Gold; RMNZ: Gold | 400 Degreez |
| "Bling Bling" (B.G. featuring Lil Wayne, Turk, Juvenile, Baby, and Mannie Fresh) | 1999 | 36 | 13 | 10 | — | — | — | — | — | — | — | | Chopper City in the Ghetto |
| "#1 Stunna" (Big Tymers featuring Lil Wayne and Juvenile) | 2000 | — (Note: "#1 Stunna" did not enter the Billboard Hot 100, but peaked at number five on the Bubbling Under Hot 100 Singles chart, which acts as an extension to the Hot 100.) | 24 | — | — | — | — | — | — | — | — | | I Got That Work |
| "I Know" (B.G. featuring Lil Wayne) | 2000 | — | — | — | — | — | — | — | — | — | — | | Checkmate |
| "Ride Out" (Mil featuring B.G., Lil Wayne, and Beanie Sigel) | 2001 | — | — | — | — | — | — | — | — | — | — | | Street Scriptures |
| "Neva Get Enuf" (3LW featuring Lil Wayne) | 2002 | — | — (Note: "Neva Get Enuf" did not enter the Hot R&B/Hip-Hop Songs chart, but peaked at number 18 on the Bubbling Under R&B/Hip-Hop Singles chart, which acts as an extension to the R&B/Hip-Hop Songs chart.) | — | — | — | — | — | — | — | — | | A Girl Can Mack |
| "Ain't It Man" (Boo & Gotti featuring Lil Wayne) | 2003 | — | — | — | — | — | — | — | — | — | — | | Perfect Timing |
| "Soldier" (Destiny's Child featuring T.I. and Lil Wayne) | 2004 | 3 | 3 | — | 3 | — | 28 | 6 | 4 | 10 | 4 | RIAA: Platinum; ARIA: Gold; BPI: Gold; RMNZ: Platinum | Destiny Fulfilled |
| "Get Your Shine On" (Birdman featuring Lil Wayne) | 2004 | — | 65 | — | — | — | — | — | — | — | — | | Fast Money |
| "Neck of the Woods" (Birdman featuring Lil Wayne) | 2004 | — | 71 | — | — | — | — | — | — | — | — | | Fast Money |
| "Hot Boys, Hot Girls" (Lil' Mo featuring Lil Wayne) | 2005 | — | — (Note: "Hot Boys, Hot Girls" did not enter the Hot R&B/Hip-Hop Songs chart, but peaked at number 28 on the Hot R&B/Hip-Hop Singles Sales chart.) | — | — | — | — | — | — | — | — | | Non-album single |
| "Don't Trip" (Trina featuring Lil Wayne) | 2005 | — | 74 | — | — | — | — | — | — | — | — | | Glamorest Life |
| "Gimme That" (Remix) (Chris Brown featuring Lil Wayne) | 2006 | 15 | 5 | — | — | — | 45 | 26 | — | 30 | 23 | RIAA: Platinum | Chris Brown |
| "Holla at Me" (DJ Khaled featuring Lil Wayne, Paul Wall, Fat Joe, Rick Ross, and Pitbull) | 2006 | 59 | 24 | 15 | — | — | — | — | — | — | — | | Listennn... the Album |
| "You Know What" (Avant featuring Lil Wayne) | 2006 | — | 58 | — | — | — | — | — | — | — | — | | Director |
| "Touch It or Not" (Cam'ron featuring Lil Wayne) | 2006 | — | 62 | — | — | — | — | — | — | — | — | | Killa Season |
| "Where da Cash At" (Currensy featuring Lil Wayne and Remy Ma) | 2006 | — | 73 | — | — | — | — | — | — | — | — | | Dedication 2 |
| "Make It Rain" (Fat Joe featuring Lil Wayne) | 2006 | 13 | 6 | 2 | — | — | — | — | 14 | — | — | RIAA: Platinum | Me, Myself & I |
| "Hollywood Divorce" (Outkast featuring Lil Wayne and Snoop Dogg) | 2006 | — | — (Note: "Hollywood Divorce" did not enter the Hot R&B/Hip-Hop Songs chart, but peaked at number 20 on the Bubbling Under R&B/Hip-Hop Singles chart, which acts as an extension to the R&B/Hip-Hop Songs chart.) | — | — | — | — | — | — | — | — | | Idlewild |
| "You" (Lloyd featuring Lil Wayne) | 2006 | 9 | 1 | — | — | — | — | — | 25 | — | 45 | RIAA: 4× Platinum; BPI: Gold; RMNZ: 2× Platinum; MC: 2× Platinum | Street Love |
| "Money Ova Here" (Stacks featuring Lil Wayne) | 2007 | — | — | — | — | — | — | — | — | — | — | | Non-album single |
| "We Takin' Over" (DJ Khaled featuring Akon, T.I., Rick Ross, Fat Joe, Birdman, and Lil Wayne) | 2007 | 28 | 26 | 11 | — | 92 | — | — | — | — | — | RIAA: Platinum; MC: Gold | We the Best |
| "Lock U Down" (Mýa featuring Lil Wayne) | 2007 | — | — (Note: "Lock U Down" did not enter the Hot R&B/Hip-Hop Songs chart, but peaked at number one on the Bubbling Under R&B/Hip-Hop Singles chart, which acts as an extension to the R&B/Hip-Hop Songs chart.) | — | — | — | — | — | — | — | — | | Liberation |
| "Pop Bottles" (Birdman featuring Lil Wayne) | 2007 | 38 | 15 | 6 | — | — | — | — | — | — | — | RIAA: Platinum | 5 * Stunna |
| "9mm" (David Banner featuring Akon, Lil Wayne, and Snoop Dogg) | 2007 | — | 66 | — | — | — | — | — | — | — | — | | The Greatest Story Ever Told |
| "Duffle Bag Boy" (Playaz Circle featuring Lil Wayne) | 2007 | 15 | 4 | 2 | — | — | — | — | — | — | — | RIAA: Platinum | Supply & Demand |
| "Uh-Ohhh!" (Ja Rule featuring Lil Wayne) | 2007 | — | 69 | — | — | — | — | — | — | — | — | | The Mirror |
| "Sweetest Girl (Dollar Bill)" (Wyclef Jean featuring Akon, Lil Wayne, and Niia) | 2007 | 12 | — (Note: "Sweetest Girl (Dollar Bill)" did not enter the Hot R&B/Hip-Hop Songs chart, but peaked at number 10 on the Bubbling Under R&B/Hip-Hop Singles chart, which acts as an extension to the R&B/Hip-Hop Songs chart.) | — | 28 | 14 | — | — | 8 | 26 | 66 | RIAA: Platinum; MC: Gold; RMNZ: 2× Platinum | Carnival Vol. II: Memoirs of an Immigrant |
| "Screwed Up" (Trae featuring Lil Wayne) | 2007 | — | 71 | — | — | — | — | — | — | — | — | | Life Goes On |
| "100 Million" (Birdman featuring Young Jeezy, Rick Ross, and Lil Wayne) | 2007 | — (Note: "100 Million" did not enter the Billboard Hot 100, but peaked at number 18 on the Bubbling Under Hot 100 Singles chart, which acts as an extension to the Hot 100.) | 69 | — | — | — | — | — | — | — | — | | 5 * Stunna |
| "In the Hood" (Brisco featuring Lil Wayne) | 2007 | — | — | — | — | — | — | — | — | — | — | | Street Medicine |
| "My House" (Currensy featuring Lil Wayne) | 2007 | — | — | — | — | — | — | — | — | — | — | | Non-album single |
| "Push" (Enrique Iglesias featuring Lil Wayne) | 2008 | — | — | — | — | — | — | — | — | — | — | | Insomniac |
| "I Got My" (Static Major featuring Lil Wayne) | 2008 | — | — (Note: "I Got My" did not enter the Hot R&B/Hip-Hop Songs chart, but peaked at number three on the Bubbling Under R&B/Hip-Hop Singles chart, which acts as an extension to the R&B/Hip-Hop Songs chart.) | — | — | — | — | — | — | — | — | | Suppertime |
| "Love in This Club Part II" (Usher featuring Beyoncé and Lil Wayne) | 2008 | 18 | 7 | — | 96 | 69 | — | — | — | — | — | RIAA: Platinum; RMNZ: Platinum | Here I Stand |
| "Girls Around the World" (Lloyd featuring Lil Wayne) | 2008 | 64 | 13 | — | — | — | — | — | — | — | — | | Lessons in Love |
| "I Run This" (Birdman featuring Lil Wayne) | 2008 | — (Note: "I Run This" did not enter the Billboard Hot 100, but peaked at number 10 on the Bubbling Under Hot 100 Singles chart, which acts as an extension to the Hot 100.) | 79 | 25 | — | — | — | — | — | — | — | RIAA: Gold | 5 * Stunna |
| "Ya Heard Me" (B.G. featuring Lil Wayne, Juvenile and Trey Songz) | 2008 | — | — | — | — | — | — | — | — | — | — | | Too Hood 2 Be Hollywood |
| "Haterz" (Glasses Malone featuring Birdman and Lil Wayne) | 2008 | — | — | — | — | — | — | — | — | — | — | | Beach Cruiser |
| "My Life" (The Game featuring Lil Wayne) | 2008 | 21 | 15 | 4 | — | 42 | — | 36 | — | 49 | 34 | | LAX |
| "Can't Believe It" (T-Pain featuring Lil Wayne) | 2008 | 7 | 2 | — | — | 70 | — | — | 13 | — | 100 | RIAA: 2× Platinum; RMNZ: Platinum | Three Ringz |
| "Let It Rock" (Kevin Rudolf featuring Lil Wayne) | 2008 | 5 | — (Note: "Let It Rock" did not enter the Hot R&B/Hip-Hop Songs chart, but peaked at number 22 on the Bubbling Under R&B/Hip-Hop Singles chart, which acts as an extension to the R&B/Hip-Hop Songs chart.) | — | 3 | 2 | — | 3 | 15 | 56 | 5 | RIAA: 4× Platinum; ARIA: Platinum; BPI: Silver; RMNZ: Gold | In the City |
| "Shawty Say" (David Banner featuring Lil Wayne) | 2008 | — (Note: "Shawty Say" did not enter the Billboard Hot 100, but peaked at number 10 on the Bubbling Under Hot 100 Singles chart, which acts as an extension to the Hot 100.) | 53 | 25 | — | — | — | — | — | — | — | | The Greatest Story Ever Told |
| "Swagga like Us" (Jay-Z and T.I. featuring Kanye West and Lil Wayne) | 2008 | 5 | 11 | 4 | — | 19 | — | — | — | — | 33 | RIAA: Platinum | Paper Trail |
| "Cuddy Buddy" (Note: Three single versions of "Cuddy Buddy" were released: the first features T-Pain, Lil Wayne and Twista; the second is identical to the first, but features Trey Songz in place of T-Pain; the third is identical to the second, but excludes Lil Wayne.) (Mike Jones featuring T-Pain, or Trey Songz, Lil Wayne and Twista) | 2008 | 76 | 32 | 16 | — | — | — | — | — | — | — | RIAA: Gold | The Voice |
| "Just Know Dat" (Brisco featuring Flo Rida and Lil Wayne) | 2008 | — | — (Note: "Just Know Dat" did not enter the Hot R&B/Hip-Hop Songs chart, but peaked at number 13 on the Bubbling Under R&B/Hip-Hop Singles chart, which acts as an extension to the R&B/Hip-Hop Songs chart.) | — | — | — | — | — | — | — | — | | Street Medicine |
| "Official Girl" (Cassie featuring Lil Wayne) | 2008 | — | — | — | — | — | — | — | — | — | — | | Non-album single |
| "Champagne Chronik Nightcap" (Solange featuring Lil Wayne) | 2008 | — | — | — | — | — | — | — | — | — | — | | Sol-Angel and the Hadley St. Dreams |
| "I'm So Paid" (Akon featuring Lil Wayne and Young Jeezy) | 2008 | 31 | 47 | — | — | 41 | 15 | — | — | — | 59 | RIAA: Platinum; BPI: Silver | Freedom |
| "Lost" (Gorilla Zoe featuring Lil Wayne) | 2008 | 71 | 29 | 10 | — | — | — | — | — | — | — | | Don't Feed da Animals |
| "All My Life (In the Ghetto)" (Jay Rock featuring Lil Wayne and will.i.am) | 2008 | — | — (Note: "All My Life (In the Ghetto)" did not enter the Hot R&B/Hip-Hop Songs chart, but peaked at number 10 on the Bubbling Under R&B/Hip-Hop Singles chart, which acts as an extension to the R&B/Hip-Hop Songs chart.) | — | — | — | — | — | — | — | — | | Follow Me Home |
| "Turnin Me On" (Keri Hilson featuring Lil Wayne) | 2008 | 15 | 2 | — | — | 80 | — | — | — | — | — | RIAA: Platinum | In a Perfect World... |
| "Make a Toast" (Dolla featuring Lil Wayne) | 2008 | — | — (Note: "Make a Toast" did not enter the Hot R&B/Hip-Hop Songs chart, but peaked at number 25 on the Bubbling Under R&B/Hip-Hop Singles chart, which acts as an extension to the R&B/Hip-Hop Songs chart.) | — | — | — | — | — | — | — | — | | Non-album single |
| "Unstoppable" (Kat DeLuna featuring Lil Wayne) | 2009 | — | — | — | — | 80 | — | — | — | — | — | | Confessions of a Shopaholic soundtrack and Inside Out |
| "Always Strapped" (Birdman featuring Lil Wayne) | 2009 | 54 | 10 | 5 | — | — | — | — | — | — | — | RIAA: Gold | Priceless |
| "Death Wish" (Jadakiss featuring Lil Wayne) | 2009 | — | — | — | — | — | — | — | — | — | — | | The Last Kiss |
| "Different Girls" (Nu Jerzey Devil featuring Lil Wayne) | 2009 | — | — (Note: "Different Girls" did not enter the Hot R&B/Hip-Hop Songs chart, but peaked at number 14 on the Bubbling Under R&B/Hip-Hop Singles chart, which acts as an extension to the R&B/Hip-Hop Songs chart.) | — | — | — | — | — | — | — | — | | Mr. Red Karpet |
| "Respect My Conglomerate" (Busta Rhymes featuring Lil Wayne and Jadakiss) | 2009 | — | 82 | — | — | — | — | — | — | — | — | | Back on My B.S. |
| "So Good" (Electrik Red featuring Lil Wayne) | 2009 | — | 60 | — | — | — | — | — | — | — | — | | How to Be a Lady: Volume 1 |
| "Maybach Music 2" (Rick Ross featuring Kanye West, T-Pain, and Lil Wayne) | 2009 | 92 | 54 | — | — | — | — | — | — | — | — | | Deeper Than Rap |
| "Down" (Jay Sean featuring Lil Wayne) | 2009 | 1 | — (Note: "Down" did not enter the Hot R&B/Hip-Hop Songs chart, but peaked at number six on the Bubbling Under R&B/Hip-Hop Singles chart, which acts as an extension to the R&B/Hip-Hop Songs chart.) | — | 2 | 3 | 17 | 10 | 2 | 8 | 3 | RIAA: Diamond; ARIA: 2× Platinum; BPI: 2× Platinum; RMNZ: 4× Platinum | All or Nothing |
| "Successful" (Drake featuring Trey Songz and Lil Wayne) | 2009 | 17 | 3 | 2 | — | — | — | — | — | — | — | RIAA: Platinum | So Far Gone |
| "Bend It Ova" (5th Ward Weebie featuring Lil Wayne) | 2009 | — | — | — | — | — | — | — | — | — | — | | Non-album single |
| "Southside" (Birdman featuring Lil Wayne) | 2009 | — | — (Note: "Southside" did not enter the Hot R&B/Hip-Hop Songs chart, but peaked at number eight on the Bubbling Under R&B/Hip-Hop Singles chart, which acts as an extension to the R&B/Hip-Hop Songs chart.) | — | — | — | — | — | — | — | — | | Priceless |
| "Forever" (Drake featuring Kanye West, Lil Wayne, and Eminem) | 2009 | 8 | 2 | 1 | 99 | 26 | — | 41 | — | 68 | 42 | RIAA: 6× Platinum; ARIA: 2× Platinum; BPI: Platinum; RMNZ: 2× Platinum | More than a Game soundtrack |
| "I'm Goin' In" (Drake featuring Lil Wayne and Young Jeezy) | 2009 | 40 | 28 | 11 | — | — | — | — | — | — | — | RIAA: Platinum | So Far Gone |
| "Money to Blow" (Birdman featuring Drake and Lil Wayne) | 2009 | 26 | 2 | 2 | — | — | — | — | — | — | — | RIAA: Platinum | Priceless |
| "Heard 'em All" (Amerie featuring Lil Wayne) | 2009 | — | 81 | — | — | — | — | — | — | — | — | | In Love & War |
| "I Can Transform Ya" (Chris Brown featuring Lil Wayne and Swizz Beatz) | 2009 | 20 | 11 | — | 21 | 54 | — | 21 | 7 | — | 26 | RIAA: 2× Platinum; ARIA: Platinum; BPI: Silver; RMNZ: Platinum | Graffiti |
| "Give It Up to Me" (Shakira featuring Lil Wayne) | 2009 | 29 | — | — | — | 32 | — | — | — | — | — | RIAA: Gold | She Wolf |
| "So Sharp" (Mack 10 featuring Jim Jones and Lil Wayne) | 2009 | — | 80 | — | — | — | — | — | — | — | — | | Soft White |
| "4 My Town (Play Ball)" (Birdman featuring Drake and Lil Wayne) | 2009 | 90 | 37 | 17 | — | — | — | — | — | — | — | | Priceless |
| "Revolver" (Madonna featuring Lil Wayne) | 2009 | — | — | — | — | 47 | — | 41 | — | — | 130 | | Celebration |
| "Women Lie, Men Lie" (Yo Gotti featuring Lil Wayne) | 2009 | 81 | 22 | 12 | — | — | — | — | — | — | — | RIAA: Gold | CM4: Both Sides Both Stories |
"—" denotes a recording that did not chart or was not released in that territory.

=== 2010–2019 ===
List of singles as featured artist, with selected chart positions and certifications, showing year released and album name
| Title | Year | Peak chart positions | | | | | | | | | | Certifications | Album |
| Title | Year | US | US R&B/HH | US Rap | AUS | CAN | FRA | IRL | NZ | SWI | UK | Certifications | Album |
|---|---|---|---|---|---|---|---|---|---|---|---|---|---|
| "I Made It (Cash Money Heroes)" (Kevin Rudolf featuring Birdman, Jay Sean, and Lil Wayne) | 2010 | 21 | — | — | 4 | 44 | — | — | 4 | — | 37 | RIAA: Platinum; ARIA: 2× Platinum | To the Sky |
| "Inkredible" (Trae tha Truth featuring Lil Wayne and Rick Ross) | 2010 | — | — | — | — | — | — | — | — | — | — | | Non-album singles |
| "Whip It" (Lamborghini Rossini featuring Lil Wayne and Yo Gotti) | 2010 | — | — | — | — | — | — | — | — | — | — | | Non-album singles |
| "Miss Me" (Drake featuring Lil Wayne) | 2010 | 15 | 3 | 2 | — | 73 | — | — | — | — | 162 | RIAA: Platinum | Thank Me Later |
| "On the Wall" (Brisco featuring Lil Wayne) | 2010 | — | 89 | — | — | — | — | — | — | — | — | | Street Medicine |
| "Tattoo Girl (Foreva)" (Detail featuring T-Pain, Lil Wayne, and Travie McCoy) | 2010 | — | — | — | — | — | — | — | — | — | — | | Non-album singles |
| "Loyalty" (Birdman featuring Lil Wayne and Tyga) | 2010 | — (Note: "Loyalty" did not enter the Billboard Hot 100, but peaked at number seven on the Bubbling Under Hot 100 Singles chart, which acts as an extension to the Hot 100.) | 61 | 25 | — | — | — | — | — | — | — | | Non-album singles |
| "I'm on It" (Tyga featuring Lil Wayne) | 2010 | — (Note: "I'm on It" did not enter the Billboard Hot 100, but peaked at number 12 on the Bubbling Under Hot 100 Singles chart, which acts as an extension to the Hot 100.) | — | — | — | — | — | — | — | — | — | | Non-album singles |
| "No Love" (Eminem featuring Lil Wayne) | 2010 | 23 | 59 | 9 | 21 | 24 | — | 31 | 22 | 39 | 33 | RIAA: 4× Platinum; ARIA: 3× Platinum; BPI: Gold; RMNZ: Platinum | Recovery |
| "Girl Like Her" (RL featuring Lil Wayne) | 2010 | — | — | — | — | — | — | — | — | — | — | | Non-album singles |
| "Fire Flame" (Birdman featuring Lil Wayne) | 2010 | 64 | 28 | 14 | — | 71 | — | — | — | — | — | | Non-album singles |
| "Papercuts" (Mystikal featuring Lil Wayne and Fiend) | 2010 | — | — | — | — | — | — | — | — | — | — | | Original |
| "Welcome to My Hood" (DJ Khaled featuring Rick Ross, Plies, Lil Wayne, and T-Pain) | 2011 | 79 | 30 | 14 | — | — | — | — | — | — | — | | We the Best Forever |
| "W.T.F." (Shawty Lo featuring Lil Wayne) | 2011 | — | — | — | — | — | — | — | — | — | — | | Million Dollar Man |
| "Roman's Revenge" (Nicki Minaj featuring Lil Wayne) | 2011 | — | — | — | — | — | — | — | — | — | — | | Pink Friday |
| "Look at Me Now" (Chris Brown featuring Lil Wayne and Busta Rhymes) | 2011 | 6 | 1 | 1 | 46 | 51 | 85 | — | 37 | — | 44 | RIAA: Diamond; ARIA: 2× Platinum; BPI: Gold; RMNZ: 2× Platinum | F.A.M.E. |
| "Bow Chicka Wow Wow" (Mike Posner featuring Lil Wayne) | 2011 | 30 | — | — | 40 | — | — | — | 21 | — | 114 | RIAA: Platinum | 31 Minutes to Takeoff |
| "Hit the Lights" (Jay Sean featuring Lil Wayne) | 2011 | 18 | — | — | 18 | 68 | — | — | 24 | — | 67 | | Hit the Lights |
| "Love Affair" (Lil Twist featuring Lil Wayne) | 2011 | — | 87 | — | — | — | — | — | — | — | — | | Don't Get It Twisted |
| "Someone to Love Me (Naked)" (Mary J. Blige featuring Diddy and Lil Wayne) | 2011 | — (Note: "Someone to Love Me (Naked)" did not enter the Billboard Hot 100, but peaked at number eight on the Bubbling Under Hot 100 Singles chart, which acts as an extension to the Hot 100.) | 28 | — | — | — | — | — | — | — | — | | My Life II... The Journey Continues (Act 1) |
| "This Is What Rock n' Roll Looks Like" (Porcelain Black featuring Lil Wayne) | 2011 | — | — | — | — | — | — | — | — | — | — | | Mannequin Factory |
| "Motivation" (Kelly Rowland featuring Lil Wayne) | 2011 | 17 | 1 | — | — | 99 | — | — | — | — | 166 | RIAA: 2× Platinum; BPI: Silver; RMNZ: Platinum | Here I Am |
| "Red Nation" (The Game featuring Lil Wayne) | 2011 | 62 | — (Note: "Red Nation" did not enter the Hot R&B/Hip-Hop Songs chart, but peaked at number 22 on the Bubbling Under R&B/Hip-Hop Singles chart, which acts as an extension to the R&B/Hip-Hop Songs chart.) | — | — | — | — | — | — | — | — | | The R.E.D. Album |
| "I Get Money" (Birdman featuring Lil Wayne, Mack Maine, and T-Pain) | 2011 | — | 63 | — | — | — | — | — | — | — | — | | Non-album single |
| "I'm on One" (DJ Khaled featuring Drake, Rick Ross, and Lil Wayne) | 2011 | 10 | 1 | 1 | — | 67 | — | — | — | — | 78 | RIAA: Gold; BPI: Gold; RMNZ: Gold | We the Best Forever |
| "I'm Into You" (Jennifer Lopez featuring Lil Wayne) | 2011 | 41 | 79 | — | 45 | 55 | 38 | 25 | — | 22 | 9 | RIAA: Gold; BPI: Gold; IFPI SWI: Gold; MC: Gold | Love? |
| "9 Piece" (Note: Two single versions of "9 Piece" were released: the first features T.I., and the second features Lil Wayne.) (Rick Ross featuring Lil Wayne or T.I.) | 2011 | 61 | 32 | 18 | — | — | — | — | — | — | — | | Ashes to Ashes |
| "Can a Drummer Get Some?" (Remix) (Travis Barker featuring Lil Wayne, Rick Ross, Swizz Beatz, and Game) | 2011 | — | — | — | — | — | — | — | — | — | — | | Non-album singles |
| "Dirty Dancer" (Enrique Iglesias and Usher featuring Lil Wayne) | 2011 | 18 | — | — | 24 | 11 | 99 | 26 | 22 | 30 | 21 | RIAA: Gold; ARIA: Platinum | Non-album singles |
| "Ballin'" (Young Jeezy featuring Lil Wayne) | 2011 | 57 | 15 | 13 | — | — | — | — | — | — | — | | Thug Motivation 103: Hustlerz Ambition |
| "Ghetto Youth Rock" (Junior Reid featuring Lil Wayne) | 2011 | — | — | — | — | — | — | — | — | — | — | | Non-album single |
| "Love U Right" (Cherlise featuring Lil Wayne) | 2011 | — | — | — | — | — | — | — | — | — | — | | Groundzero |
| "Y.U. Mad" (Birdman featuring Nicki Minaj and Lil Wayne) | 2011 | 68 | 46 | 25 | — | — | — | — | — | — | — | | Non-album single |
| "Finito" (N.O.R.E. featuring Pharrell and Lil Wayne) | 2011 | — | — | — | — | — | — | — | — | — | — | | Scared Money |
| "Strange Clouds" (B.o.B featuring Lil Wayne) | 2011 | 7 | 43 | 16 | 69 | 26 | — | — | 39 | 47 | 72 | RIAA: 2× Platinum; MC: Gold | Strange Clouds |
| "Weekend (Wicked Wow)" (Carolina Márquez and Jaykay featuring Lil Wayne and Glasses Malone) | 2011 | — | — | — | — | — | — | — | — | — | — | | Non-album single |
| "Sweat" (Bow Wow featuring Lil Wayne) | 2011 | 48 | — (Note: "Sweat" did not enter the Hot R&B/Hip-Hop Songs chart, but peaked at number four on the Bubbling Under R&B/Hip-Hop Singles chart, which acts as an extension to the R&B/Hip-Hop Songs chart.) | — | — | — | — | — | — | — | — | | Underrated |
| "So Good" (Shanell featuring Drake and Lil Wayne) | 2011 | — | — (Note: "So Good" did not enter the Hot R&B/Hip-Hop Songs chart, but peaked at number five on the Bubbling Under R&B/Hip-Hop Singles chart, which acts as an extension to the R&B/Hip-Hop Songs chart.) | — | — | — | — | — | — | — | — | | Non-album single |
| "The Motto" (Drake featuring Lil Wayne) | 2011 | 14 | 1 | 1 | — | 38 | — | — | — | — | 80 | RIAA: Diamond; ARIA: 2× Platinum; BPI: Platinum; RMNZ: 3× Platinum | Take Care |
| "Pretty Lil' Heart" (Robin Thicke featuring Lil Wayne) | 2011 | — (Note: "Pretty Lil' Heart" did not enter the Billboard Hot 100, but peaked at number six on the Bubbling Under Hot 100 Singles chart, which acts as an extension to the Hot 100.) | 51 | — | — | — | — | — | — | — | — | | Love After War |
| "Original" (Mystikal featuring Birdman and Lil Wayne) | 2011 | — | 80 | — | — | — | — | — | — | — | — | | Original |
| "Yao Ming" (David Banner featuring Lil Wayne and 2 Chainz) | 2011 | — | — | — | — | — | — | — | — | — | — | | Sex, Drugs and Video Games |
| "Faded" (Tyga featuring Lil Wayne) | 2012 | 33 | 19 | 7 | — | — | — | — | — | — | — | RIAA: 2× Platinum | Careless World: Rise of the Last King |
| "Ima Boss (Remix)" (Meek Mill featuring T.I., Birdman, Lil Wayne, DJ Khaled, Rick Ross, and Swizz Beatz) | 2012 | 51 | — | — | — | — | — | — | — | — | — | | Non-album single |
| "All Aboard" (Romeo Santos featuring Lil Wayne) | 2012 | — | — | — | — | — | — | — | — | — | — | | Formula, Vol. 1 |
| "Take It to the Head" (DJ Khaled featuring Chris Brown, Rick Ross, Nicki Minaj, and Lil Wayne) | 2012 | 58 | 6 | 6 | — | — | — | — | — | — | 102 | RIAA: Platinum | Kiss the Ring |
| "HYFR (Hell Ya Fucking Right)" (Drake featuring Lil Wayne) | 2012 | 62 | 20 | 17 | — | — | — | — | — | — | — | ARIA: Gold; RIAA: 2× Platinum; BPI: Silver; RMNZ: Gold | Take Care |
| "I Can Only Imagine" (David Guetta featuring Chris Brown and Lil Wayne) | 2012 | 44 | — | — | 47 | 35 | 40 | 18 | 28 | 15 | 18 | ARIA: Gold | Nothing but the Beat |
| "Mirror" (Bobby V featuring Lil Wayne) | 2012 | — | 61 | — | — | — | — | — | — | — | — | | Dusk Till Dawn |
| "Pop That" (French Montana featuring Rick Ross, Drake, and Lil Wayne) | 2012 | 36 | 2 | 2 | — | — | — | — | — | — | — | RIAA: 2× Platinum | Excuse My French |
| "Dark Shades" (Birdman featuring Lil Wayne and Mack Maine) | 2012 | — | — | — | — | — | — | — | — | — | — | | Non-album single |
| "Enough of No Love" (Keyshia Cole featuring Lil Wayne) | 2012 | 84 | 7 | — | — | — | — | — | — | — | — | | Woman to Woman |
| "Lover" (PJ Morton featuring Lil Wayne) | 2012 | — | — | — | — | — | — | — | — | — | — | | New Orleans |
| "Ice" (Kelly Rowland featuring Lil Wayne) | 2012 | 88 | 24 | — | — | — | — | — | — | — | — | | Non-album singles |
| "Celebrate" (Mack Maine featuring Lil Wayne and Talib Kweli) | 2012 | — | — | — | — | — | — | — | — | — | — | | Non-album singles |
| "Bandz a Make Her Dance" (Juicy J featuring Lil Wayne and 2 Chainz) | 2012 | 29 | 6 | 5 | — | — | — | — | — | — | — | RIAA: Platinum; RMNZ: Platinum | Stay Trippy |
| "Celebration" (The Game featuring Chris Brown, Tyga, Wiz Khalifa, and Lil Wayne) | 2012 | 81 | 24 | 19 | — | — | — | — | — | — | — | RMNZ: Gold | Jesus Piece |
| "Champions" (Kevin Rudolf featuring Limp Bizkit, Birdman, and Lil Wayne) | 2012 | — | — | — | — | — | — | — | — | — | — | | Non-album singles |
| "I Got It" (JT tha Sorce featuring Lil Wayne, Maryland Monroe, DJ Unk, Slick Pulla, and Baby D) | 2012 | — | — | — | — | — | — | — | — | — | — | | Non-album singles |
| "She Don't Put It Down" (Joe Budden featuring Lil Wayne and Tank) | 2012 | 96 | 32 | 25 | — | — | — | — | — | — | — | | No Love Lost |
| "Ball" (T.I. featuring Lil Wayne) | 2012 | 50 | 11 | 10 | — | 58 | — | — | — | — | — | RIAA: Platinum | Trouble Man: Heavy Is the Head |
| "Yellow Tape" (Fat Joe featuring Lil Wayne, ASAP Rocky, and French Montana) | 2012 | — | — (Note: "Yellow Tape" did not enter the Hot R&B/Hip-Hop Songs chart, but peaked at number seven on the Bubbling Under R&B/Hip-Hop Singles chart, which acts as an extension to the R&B/Hip-Hop Songs chart.) | — | — | — | — | — | — | — | — | | Non-album single |
| "Marble Floors" (French Montana featuring Lil Wayne, Rick Ross, and 2 Chainz) | 2012 | — | — (Note: "Marble Floors" did not enter the Hot R&B/Hip-Hop Songs chart, but peaked at number one on the Bubbling Under R&B/Hip-Hop Singles chart, which acts as an extension to the R&B/Hip-Hop Songs chart.) | — | — | — | — | — | — | — | — | | Excuse My French |
| "Hello" (Stafford Brothers featuring Lil Wayne and Christina Milian) | 2012 | — | — | — | 4 | — | — | — | — | — | — | ARIA: 2× Platinum | Non-album single |
| "Karate Chop (Remix)" (Future featuring Lil Wayne) | 2013 | 82 | 27 | 19 | — | — | — | — | — | — | — | | Honest |
| "All That (Lady)" (The Game featuring Lil Wayne, Big Sean, Fabolous, and Jeremih) | 2013 | — | 48 | — | — | — | — | — | — | — | — | | Jesus Piece |
| "Tapout" (Rich Gang featuring Lil Wayne, Birdman, Mack Maine, Nicki Minaj, and Future) | 2013 | 44 | 10 | 8 | — | — | 134 | — | — | — | — | RIAA: Gold; RMNZ: Gold | Rich Gang |
| "Ride 2 It" (TSC featuring Lil Wayne) | 2013 | — | — | — | — | — | — | — | — | — | — | | Non-album singles |
| "Ready to Go" (Limp Bizkit featuring Lil Wayne) | 2013 | — | — | — | — | — | — | — | — | — | — | | Stampede of the Disco Elephants |
| "High School" (Nicki Minaj featuring Lil Wayne) | 2013 | 64 | 20 | 15 | — | 81 | 91 | — | — | — | 31 | RIAA: 2× Platinum; ARIA: Platinum; BPI: Gold; RMNZ: Platinum | Pink Friday: Roman Reloaded – The Re-Up |
| "All the Time" (Jeremih featuring Lil Wayne and Natasha Mosley) | 2013 | — (Note: "All the Time" did not enter the Billboard Hot 100, but peaked at number 24 on the Bubbling Under Hot 100 Singles chart, which acts as an extension to the Hot 100.) | 47 | — | — | — | — | — | — | — | — | RIAA: Gold; BPI: Silver; RMNZ: Platinum | Late Nights with Jeremih |
| "No New Friends" (DJ Khaled featuring Drake, Rick Ross, and Lil Wayne) | 2013 | 37 | 9 | 8 | — | — | — | — | — | — | 106 | RIAA: Platinum | Suffering from Success |
| "Wit Me" (T.I. featuring Lil Wayne) | 2013 | 80 | 27 | 21 | — | — | — | — | — | — | — | | Non-album single |
| "We Outchea" (Ace Hood featuring Lil Wayne) | 2013 | — (Note: "We Outchea" did not enter the Billboard Hot 100, but peaked at number 19 on the Bubbling Under Hot 100 Singles chart, which acts as an extension to the Hot 100.) | 49 | — | — | — | — | — | — | — | — | | Trials & Tribulations |
| "Beware" (Big Sean featuring Lil Wayne and Jhené Aiko) | 2013 | 38 | 10 | 7 | — | — | — | — | — | — | 183 | RIAA: 4× Platinum; BPI: Silver; RMNZ: Platinum | Hall of Fame |
| "We Been On" (Rich Gang featuring R. Kelly, Birdman, and Lil Wayne) | 2013 | — | — | — | — | — | — | — | — | — | — | | Rich Gang |
| "She Tried" (Remix) (P.A.P.I. featuring Lil Wayne, Ja Rule, and Birdman) | 2013 | — | — | — | — | — | — | — | — | — | — | | Non-album single |
| "Good Time" (Paris Hilton featuring Lil Wayne) | 2013 | — | — | — | — | — | — | — | — | — | — | | Non-album single |
| "Thank You" (Busta Rhymes featuring Q-Tip, Kanye West, and Lil Wayne) | 2013 | — | — (Note: "Thank You" did not enter the Hot R&B/Hip-Hop Songs chart, but peaked at number seven on the Bubbling Under R&B/Hip-Hop Singles chart, which acts as an extension to the R&B/Hip-Hop Songs chart.) | — | 52 | — | 179 | — | — | — | 13 | | E.L.E.2 (Extinction Level Event 2) |
| "Backpack" (Justin Bieber featuring Lil Wayne) | 2013 | — | — | — | — | — | — | — | — | — | 171 | | Journals |
| "Loyal" (Note: Three single versions of "Loyal" were released: the first, titled the "East Coast Version", features Lil Wayne and French Montana; the second, titled the "West Coast Version", is identical to the first, but features Too Short in place of French Montana; the third is identical to the second, but features Tyga in place of Too Short. Their sales are combined to create the song's chart positions.) (Chris Brown featuring Lil Wayne, and French Montana, Too Short or Tyga) | 2013 | 9 | 4 | — | 42 | 90 | 35 | 59 | 19 | — | 10 | RIAA: 6× Platinum; ARIA: 3× Platinum; BPI: 2× Platinum; RMNZ: 4× Platinum | X |
| "We Alright" (Young Money featuring Euro, Birdman, and Lil Wayne) | 2014 | — | — (Note: "We Alright" did not enter the Hot R&B/Hip-Hop Songs chart, but peaked at number six on the Bubbling Under R&B/Hip-Hop Singles chart, which acts as an extension to the R&B/Hip-Hop Songs chart.) | — | — | — | — | — | — | — | — | | Young Money: Rise of an Empire |
| "Thug Cry" (Rick Ross featuring Lil Wayne) | 2014 | — (Note: "Thug Cry" did not enter the Billboard Hot 100, but peaked at number 12 on the Bubbling Under Hot 100 Singles chart, which acts as an extension to the Hot 100.) | 37 | 24 | — | — | — | — | — | — | 193 | | Mastermind |
| "Buy the World" (Mike Will Made It featuring Future, Lil Wayne, and Kendrick Lamar) | 2014 | — | 42 | — | — | — | — | — | — | — | — | RIAA: Gold | Ransom |
| "Only" (Nicki Minaj featuring Drake, Lil Wayne, and Chris Brown) | 2014 | 12 | 1 | 1 | 62 | 20 | 121 | — | — | — | 35 | RIAA: 3× Platinum; BPI: Platinum; RMNZ: 2× Platinum | The Pinkprint |
| "Truffle Butter" (Nicki Minaj featuring Drake and Lil Wayne) | 2015 | 14 | 4 | 3 | — | 43 | — | — | — | — | 188 | ARIA: Platinum; BPI: Gold; RMNZ: Platinum | The Pinkprint |
| "Find You" (Plies featuring Lil Wayne and K Camp) | 2015 | — | — | — | — | — | — | — | — | — | — | | Purple Heart |
| "Vamonos" (YT Triz featuring Rick Ross and Lil Wayne) | 2015 | — | — | — | — | — | — | — | — | — | — | | Dysfunctional |
| "How Many Times" (DJ Khaled featuring Chris Brown, Big Sean, and Lil Wayne) | 2015 | 68 | 17 | 13 | — | — | — | — | — | — | — | RIAA: Gold | I Changed a Lot |
| "Just Right for Me" (Monica featuring Lil Wayne) | 2015 | — | — | — | — | — | — | — | — | — | — | | Code Red |
| "Brown Sugar" (Ray J featuring Lil Wayne) | 2015 | — | — | — | — | — | — | — | — | — | — | | Non-album single |
| "Why I Do It" (August Alsina featuring Lil Wayne) | 2015 | — | — | — | — | — | — | — | — | — | — | | This Thing Called Life |
| "Do It" (Christina Milian featuring Lil Wayne) | 2015 | — | — | — | — | — | — | — | — | — | — | | Non-album single |
| "Bottom of the Bottle" (Curren$y featuring August Alsina and Lil Wayne) | 2015 | 97 | 29 | 18 | — | — | — | — | — | — | — | | Canal Street Confidential |
| "Switch Up" (R. Kelly featuring Jeremih and Lil Wayne) | 2015 | — | — | — | — | — | — | — | — | — | — | | The Buffet |
| "Order More (Remix)" (G-Eazy featuring Lil Wayne Yo Gotti, and Starrah) | 2016 | — | — | — | — | — | — | — | — | — | — | RIAA: Platinum | Non-album singles |
| "MFN Right (Remix)" (2 Chainz featuring Lil Wayne) | 2016 | — | — | — | — | — | — | — | — | — | — | RIAA: Gold | Non-album singles |
| "No Problem" (Chance the Rapper featuring Lil Wayne and 2 Chainz) | 2016 | 43 | 14 | 10 | — | — | — | — | — | — | — | RIAA: 4× Platinum; BPI: Silver; RMNZ: 2× Platinum | Coloring Book |
| "Bounce" (2 Chainz featuring Lil Wayne) | 2016 | — (Note: "Bounce" did not enter the Billboard Hot 100, but peaked at number 4 on the Bubbling Under Hot 100 Singles chart.) | 34 | — | — | — | — | — | — | — | — | | ColleGrove |
| "Gotta Lotta" (2 Chainz featuring Lil Wayne) | 2016 | 100 | 33 | 20 | — | — | — | — | — | — | — | | ColleGrove |
| "Like Dat" (PartyNextDoor and Jeremih featuring Lil Wayne) | 2016 | — | — | — | — | 100 | — | — | — | — | — | | Late Night Party |
| "Running Back" (Wale featuring Lil Wayne) | 2017 | 100 | 37 | — | — | — | — | — | — | — | — | | Shine |
| "Life of the Party" (Young Chris featuring Lil Wayne) | 2017 | — | — | — | — | — | — | — | — | — | — | | The Network 4 |
| "Light My Body Up" (David Guetta featuring Nicki Minaj and Lil Wayne) | 2017 | — (Note: "Light My Body Up" did not enter the Billboard Hot 100, but peaked at number 6 on the Bubbling Under Hot 100 Singles chart.) | — | — | — | — | 16 | 85 | — (Note: "Light My Body Up" did not enter the NZ Top 40 Singles Chart, but peaked at number three on the NZ Heatseekers Singles Chart.) | 39 | 64 | | Non-album single |
| "I'm the One" (DJ Khaled featuring Justin Bieber, Quavo, Chance the Rapper, and Lil Wayne) | 2017 | 1 | 1 | 1 | 1 | 1 | 11 | 2 | 1 | 6 | 1 | RIAA: Diamond; ARIA: 8× Platinum; BPI: 2× Platinum; MC: 7× Platinum; RMNZ: 4× Platinum; SNEP: Platinum | Grateful |
| "The Way I Are (Dance with Somebody)" (Bebe Rexha featuring Lil Wayne) | 2017 | — | — | — | 72 | — | — | — | — | — | — | | All Your Fault: Pt. 2 |
| "Like a Man" (Onhel featuring Lil Wayne) | 2017 | — | — | — | — | — | — | — | — | — | — | | Non-album single |
| "Codeine Dreaming" (Kodak Black featuring Lil Wayne) | 2017 | 52 | 20 | 18 | — | 53 | — | — | — | — | — | RIAA: 2× Platinum; RMNZ: Gold | Project Baby 2: All Grown Up |
| "Rich Sex" (Nicki Minaj featuring Lil Wayne) | 2018 | 56 | — | — | — | — | — | — | — | — | — | ARIA: Gold | Queen |
| "Corazon" (Maître Gims featuring Lil Wayne and French Montana) | 2018 | — | — | — | — | — | 68 | — | — | — | — | SNEP: Gold | Ceinture noire |
| "Fuck a Real Nigga" (DJ Clue featuring Plies, Lil Wayne, Chris Echols, and Chinx) | 2018 | — | — | — | — | — | — | — | — | — | — | | Non-album single |
| "Pistol on My Side (P.O.M.S.)" (Swizz Beatz featuring Lil Wayne) | 2018 | — | — | — | — | — | — | — | — | — | — | | Poison |
| "Good Form (Remix)" (Nicki Minaj featuring Lil Wayne) | 2018 | 60 | 29 | — | — | 46 | — | — | — (Note: "Good Form" did not enter the NZ Top 40 Singles Chart, but peaked at number 28 on the NZ Hot Singles Chart.) | — | — | ARIA: Platinum; RMNZ: Gold | Queen |
| "I Don't Even Know You Anymore" (Netsky featuring Bazzi and Lil Wayne) | 2019 | — | — | — | — | — | — | — | — | — | — | RMNZ: Gold | Non-album single |
| "Be Like Me" (Lil Pump featuring Lil Wayne) | 2019 | 72 | 33 | 33 | — | 47 | — | 71 | — (Note: "Be Like Me" did not enter the NZ Top 40 Singles Chart, but peaked at number nine on the NZ Hot Singles Chart.) | — | — | | Harverd Dropout |
"—" denotes a recording that did not chart or was not released in that territory.

=== 2020–present ===
List of singles as featured artist, with selected chart positions and certifications, showing year released and album name
| Title | Year | Peak chart positions | | | | | | | | Certifications | Album |
| Title | Year | US | US R&B/HH | US Rap | AUS | CAN | IRL | NZ | UK | Certifications | Album |
|---|---|---|---|---|---|---|---|---|---|---|---|
| "Whats Poppin (Remix)" (Jack Harlow featuring DaBaby, Tory Lanez, and Lil Wayne) | 2020 | 2 | 2 | 2 | — | 4 | — | — | — | RIAA: Platinum; BPI: Platinum | Thats What They All Say |
| "Money Maker" (2 Chainz featuring Lil Wayne) | 2020 | — | — | — | — | — | — | — | — | | So Help Me God |
| "No Ceilings" (ASAP Ferg featuring Lil Wayne and Jay Gwuapo) | 2020 | — | — | — | — | — | — | — | — | | Floor Seats II |
| "Timeless" (Benny the Butcher featuring Lil Wayne and Big Sean) | 2020 | — | — | — | — | — | — | — | — | | Burden of Proof |
| "Iced Out Audemars (Remix)" (Pop Smoke featuring Lil Wayne) | 2020 | — | — | — | — | — | — | — | — | | Non-album singles |
| "Pussy Talk (Remix)" (City Girls featuring Lil Wayne, Jack Harlow, and Quavo) | 2020 | — | — | — | — | — | — | — | — | | Non-album singles |
| "A.I. with the Braids" (The Game featuring Lil Wayne) | 2020 | — | — | — | — | — | — | — | — | | Non-album singles |
| "Big Tipper" (Tory Lanez featuring Melii and Lil Wayne) | 2020 | — | — | — | — | — | — | — | — | | Loner |
| "Miseducation" (Calboy featuring Lil Wayne) | 2021 | — | — | — | — | — | — | — | — | | Redemption |
| "Gold Fronts" (Fousheé featuring Lil Wayne) | 2021 | — | — | — | — | — | — | — | — | | Non-album single |
| "Right One" (Dame D.O.L.L.A. featuring Mozzy & Lil Wayne) | 2021 | — | — | — | — | — | — | — | — | | Different on Lord Levels |
| "Wockesha (Remix)" (Moneybagg Yo featuring Lil Wayne and Ashanti) | 2021 | — | — | — | — | — | — | — | — | | A Gangsta's Pain |
| "Seeing Green" (Nicki Minaj featuring Lil Wayne and Drake) | 2021 | — | — | — | — | — | — | — | — | | Non-album single |
| "Sinister" (Cordae featuring Lil Wayne) | 2021 | — | — | — | — | — | — | — | — | | From a Birds Eye View |
| "We Set the Trends (Remix)" (Jim Jones featuring DJ Khaled, Migos, Lil Wayne and Juelz Santana) | 2022 | — | — | — | — | — | — | — | — | | Non-album single |
| "Sunshine" (Latto featuring Lil Wayne and Childish Gambino) | 2022 | — (Note: "Sunshine" did not enter the Billboard Hot 100, but peaked at number 25 on the Bubbling Under Hot 100 chart, which acts as an extension to the Hot 100.) | — | — | — | — | — | — | — | | 777 |
| "El Niño" (Big Freedia featuring Lil Wayne and Boyfriend) | 2023 | — | — | — | — | — | — | — | — | | Central City |
| "Ain't Gonna Answer" (NLE Choppa and Lil Wayne) | 2023 | — (Note: "Ain't Gonna Answer" did not enter the Billboard Hot 100, but peaked at number 10 on the Bubbling Under Hot 100 chart, which acts as an extension to the Hot 100.) | 33 | — | — | — | — | — | — | | Cottonwood 2 |
| Echota Yoda" (Lil Cory featuring Lil Wayne) | 2023 | — | — | — | — | — | — | — | — | | Wayy 2 Hott |
| "Big Dog" (Benny the Butcher featuring Lil Wayne) | 2023 | — | — | — | — | — | — | — | — | | Everybody Can't Go |
| "High3r" (Mike Will Made It featuring Lil Wayne & Lil Yachty) | 2024 | — | — | — | — | — | — | — | — | | TBA |
| "Came Out a Beast" (Flau'jae featuring Lil Wayne) | 2024 | — | — | — | — | — | — | — | — | | Best of Both Worlds |
| "Saturday Mornings" (Cordae featuring Lil Wayne) | 2024 | — | 41 | — | — | — | — | — | — | | The Crossroads |
| "Ridin" (Jessie Reyez featuring Lil Wayne) | 2024 | — | — | — | — | — | — | — | — | | Paid in Memories |
| "Sticky" (Tyler, the Creator featuring GloRilla, Sexyy Red, and Lil Wayne) | 2024 | 10 | 1 | 1 | 33 | 26 | 63 | 25 | 57 | MC: Platinum | Chromakopia |
| "Pop It Off" (with Tyga) | 2025 | — | — | — | — | — | — | — | — | | NSFW |
| "Tweaker (Remix)" (Gelo featuring Lil Wayne) | 2025 | — | — | — | — | — | — | — | — | | Non-album single |
| "Tree" (Chance the Rapper featuring Lil Wayne and Smino) | 2025 | — | — | — | — | — | — | — | — | | Star Line |
| "Love Is Like" (Maroon 5 featuring Lil Wayne) | 2025 | — | — | — | — | — | — | — | — | | Love Is Like |
"—" denotes a recording that did not chart or was not released in that territory.

== Promotional singles ==
List of promotional singles, with selected chart positions, showing year released and album name
| Title | Year | Peak chart positions | | | | | Certifications | Album |
| Title | Year | US | US R&B/HH | US Rap | CAN | UK | Certifications | Album |
|---|---|---|---|---|---|---|---|---|
| "Diamonds on My Neck" (Remix) (Smitty featuring Swizz Beatz, Lil Wayne and Twista) | 2005 | — | — | — | — | — | | Non-album singles |
| "Party Like a Rockstar" (Remix) (Shop Boyz featuring Lil Wayne and Chamillionaire) | 2007 | — | — | — | — | — | | Non-album singles |
| "I'm So Hood" (Remix) (DJ Khaled featuring Young Jeezy, Ludacris, Busta Rhymes, Big Boi, Lil Wayne, Fat Joe, Birdman and Rick Ross) | 2007 | — | — | — | — | — | | We the Best |
| "Just Fine" (Treat 'Em Right Remix) (Mary J. Blige featuring Lil Wayne) | 2008 | — | — | — | — | — | | Non-album single |
| "You Ain't Got Nuthin" (featuring Juelz Santana and Fabolous) | 2008 | 81 | — | — | 81 | — | | Tha Carter III |
| "Mr. Carter" (featuring Jay-Z) | 2008 | 62 | 27 | 13 | — | — | RIAA: Platinum | Tha Carter III |
| "Comfortable" (featuring Babyface) | 2008 | — | 76 | — | — | — | | Tha Carter III |
| "Da Da Da" | 2009 | — | — | — | — | — | | Rebirth |
| "Fuck Today" (Rebirth Mix) (featuring Gudda Gudda) | 2010 | 76 | — | — | — | — | | Non-album singles |
| "Sleazy Remix 2.0: Get Sleazier" (Kesha featuring Lil Wayne, Wiz Khalifa, T.I. and André 3000) | 2011 | 37 | — | — | 46 | — | | Non-album singles |
| "Roman Reloaded" (Nicki Minaj featuring Lil Wayne) | 2012 | 70 | 57 | — | — | 143 | | Pink Friday: Roman Reloaded |
| "Born Stunna" (Remix) (Birdman featuring Rick Ross, Nicki Minaj and Lil Wayne) | 2012 | — | — | — | — | — | | Non-album single |
| "Scream & Shout" (Hit-Boy Remix) (will.i.am featuring Britney Spears, Hit-Boy, Waka Flocka Flame, Lil Wayne and Diddy) | 2013 | — | 49 | — | — | — | | #willpower |
| "My Nigga" (Remix) (YG featuring Lil Wayne, Rich Homie Quan, Meek Mill and Nicki Minaj) | 2014 | — | — | — | — | — | | My Krazy Life |
| "Krazy" (Note: "Krazy" did not enter the Billboard Hot 100, but peaked at number 24 on the Bubbling Under Hot 100 Singles chart, which acts as an extension to the Hot 100.) | 2014 | — | 42 | — | — | — | | Non-album singles |
| "Grindin'" (featuring Drake) | 2014 | — | — | — | — | — | | Non-album singles |
| "Start a Fire" (featuring Christina Milian) | 2014 | — | 60 | — | — | — | | Non-album singles |
| "Kissin on My Tattoos" (Remix) (August Alsina featuring Lil Wayne) | 2015 | — | — | — | — | — | | Non-album singles |
| "Me U & Hennessy" (Remix) (DeJ Loaf featuring Lil Wayne) | 2015 | — | 38 | — | — | — | RMNZ: Gold | Sell Sole |
| "Nothing but Trouble" (with Charlie Puth) | 2015 | 87 | — | — | — | — | | 808: The Music |
| "Let Me Love You" (Ariana Grande featuring Lil Wayne) | 2016 | 99 | — | — | — | 180 | RIAA: Platinum; BPI: Silver; RMNZ: Platinum | Dangerous Woman |
| "What's My Age Again? / A Milli" (with Blink-182) | 2019 | — | — | — | — | — | | Non-album singles |
| "NFL" (featuring Gudda Gudda and Hoodybaby) | 2020 | — | — | — | — | — | | Non-album singles |
| "Green & Yellow" | 2021 | — | — | — | — | — | | Non-album singles |
| "Batman" (Remix) (with LPB Boody featuring Moneybagg Yo) | 2021 | — | — | — | — | — | | Non-album singles |
| "Miss My Dawgs" (with YG) | 2022 | — | — | — | — | — | | Non-album singles |
| "The Formula" (will.i.am featuring Lil Wayne) | 2023 | — | — | — | — | — | | Non-album singles |
| "Carnival" (Remix) (NLE Choppa featuring Lil Wayne) | 2024 | — | — | — | — | — | | Non-album singles |
| "Ya Don't Stop" (DJ Premier featuring Lil Wayne, Big Sean & Rick Ross) | 2024 | — | — | — | — | — | | Non-album singles |
| "Can't Hold Me Down" (with Pharrell, Lil Yachty, Doodles & Kyle Richh) | 2024 | — | — | — | — | — | | Non-album singles |
| "Firebomber" (B.G. featuring Lil Wayne & Busta Rhymes) | 2025 | — | — | — | — | — | | Non-album single |
"—" denotes a recording that did not chart or was not released in that territory.

== Other charted songs ==
List of songs, with selected chart positions and certifications, showing year released and album name
| Title | Year | Peak chart positions | | | | | | | | | Certifications | Album |
| Title | Year | US | US R&B/HH | US Rap | AUS | CAN | GER | NZ | SWI | UK | Certifications | Album |
|---|---|---|---|---|---|---|---|---|---|---|---|---|
| "Barry Bonds" (Kanye West featuring Lil Wayne) | 2007 | — | — (Note: "Barry Bonds" did not enter the Hot R&B/Hip-Hop Songs chart, but peaked at number 24 on the Bubbling Under R&B/Hip-Hop Singles chart, which acts as an extension to the R&B/Hip-Hop Songs chart.) | — | — | — | — | — | — | — | RIAA: Gold | Graduation |
| "Whip Game Proper" (Twista featuring Lil Wayne) | 2007 | — | — (Note: "Whip Game Proper" did not enter the Hot R&B/Hip-Hop Songs chart, but peaked at number nine on the Bubbling Under R&B/Hip-Hop Singles chart, which acts as an extension to the R&B/Hip-Hop Songs chart.) | — | — | — | — | — | — | — | | Adrenaline Rush 2007 |
| "Hello Brooklyn 2.0" (Jay-Z featuring Lil Wayne) | 2007 | — | — (Note: "Hello Brooklyn 2.0" did not enter the Hot R&B/Hip-Hop Songs chart, but peaked at number five on the Bubbling Under R&B/Hip-Hop Singles chart, which acts as an extension to the R&B/Hip-Hop Songs chart.) | — | — | — | — | — | — | — | | American Gangster |
| "Luxury Tax" (Rick Ross featuring Lil Wayne, Young Jeezy and Trick Daddy) | 2008 | — (Note: "Luxury Tax" did not enter the Billboard Hot 100, but peaked at number three on the Bubbling Under Hot 100 Singles chart, which acts as an extension to the Hot 100.) | — | — | — | — | — | — | — | — | | Trilla |
| "Damn I'm Cold" (Bun B featuring Lil Wayne) | 2008 | — | 86 | — | — | — | — | — | — | — | | II Trill |
| "3 Peat" | 2008 | 66 | — | — | — | — | — | — | — | — | RIAA: Platinum | Tha Carter III |
| "Tie My Hands" (featuring Robin Thicke) | 2008 | — | — (Note: "Tie My Hands" did not enter the Hot R&B/Hip-Hop Songs chart, but peaked at number three on the Bubbling Under R&B/Hip-Hop Singles chart, which acts as an extension to the R&B/Hip-Hop Songs chart.) | — | — | — | — | — | — | — | | Tha Carter III |
| "La La" (featuring Brisco and Busta Rhymes) | 2008 | — | — (Note: "La La" did not enter the Hot R&B/Hip-Hop Songs chart, but peaked at number six on the Bubbling Under R&B/Hip-Hop Singles chart, which acts as an extension to the R&B/Hip-Hop Songs chart.) | — | — | — | — | — | — | — | | Tha Carter III |
| "See You in My Nightmares" (Kanye West featuring Lil Wayne) | 2008 | 21 | — | — | — | 22 | — | — | — | 111 | | 808s & Heartbreak |
| "Number One" (Jamie Foxx featuring Lil Wayne) | 2008 | — | — (Note: "Number One" did not enter the Hot R&B/Hip-Hop Songs chart, but peaked at number seven on the Bubbling Under R&B/Hip-Hop Singles chart, which acts as an extension to the R&B/Hip-Hop Songs chart.) | — | — | — | — | — | — | — | | Intuition |
| "Last of a Dying Breed" (Ludacris featuring Lil Wayne) | 2008 | 65 | — | — | — | — | — | — | — | — | | Theater of the Mind |
| "Kobe Bryant" | 2009 | — | — (Note: "Kobe Bryant" did not enter the Hot R&B/Hip-Hop Songs chart, but peaked at number 19 on the Bubbling Under R&B/Hip-Hop Singles chart, which acts as an extension to the R&B/Hip-Hop Songs chart.) | — | — | — | — | — | — | — | | Non-album song |
| "The Supplier" (Shawty Lo featuring Lil Wayne and Trey Songz) | 2009 | — | — (Note: "The Supplier" did not enter the Hot R&B/Hip-Hop Songs chart, but peaked at number eight on the Bubbling Under R&B/Hip-Hop Singles chart, which acts as an extension to the R&B/Hip-Hop Songs chart.) | — | — | — | — | — | — | — | | Shawty Balboa |
| "I Get Crazy" (Nicki Minaj featuring Lil Wayne) | 2009 | — | 37 | 20 | — | — | — | — | — | — | | Beam Me Up Scotty |
| "The Leak" (Lil Twist featuring Lil Wayne) | 2009 | — | 77 | — | — | — | — | — | — | — | | The Year Book |
| "Scared Money" (Young Jeezy featuring Lil Wayne) | 2009 | — | — (Note: "Scared Money" did not enter the Hot R&B/Hip-Hop Songs chart, but peaked at number seven on the Bubbling Under R&B/Hip-Hop Singles chart, which acts as an extension to the R&B/Hip-Hop Songs chart.) | — | — | — | — | — | — | — | | Non-album song |
| "American Star" (featuring Shanell) | 2010 | 91 | — | — | — | — | — | — | — | — | | Rebirth |
| "Gonorrhea" (featuring Drake) | 2010 | 17 | — (Note: "Gonorrhea" did not enter the Hot R&B/Hip-Hop Songs chart, but peaked at number 15 on the Bubbling Under R&B/Hip-Hop Singles chart, which acts as an extension to the R&B/Hip-Hop Songs chart.) | — | — | 86 | — | — | — | — | RIAA: Gold | I Am Not a Human Being |
| "Hold Up" (featuring T-Streets) | 2010 | — (Note: "Hold Up" did not enter the Billboard Hot 100, but peaked at number two on the Bubbling Under Hot 100 Singles chart, which acts as an extension to the Hot 100.) | — | — | — | — | — | — | — | — | | I Am Not a Human Being |
| "With You" (featuring Drake) | 2010 | — (Note: "With You" did not enter the Billboard Hot 100, but peaked at number 11 on the Bubbling Under Hot 100 Singles chart, which acts as an extension to the Hot 100.) | — (Note: "With You" did not enter the Hot R&B/Hip-Hop Songs chart, but peaked at number 17 on the Bubbling Under R&B/Hip-Hop Singles chart, which acts as an extension to the R&B/Hip-Hop Songs chart.) | — | — | — | — | — | — | — | | I Am Not a Human Being |
| "I Am Not a Human Being" | 2010 | 65 | — | — | — | — | — | — | — | — | | I Am Not a Human Being |
| "What's Wrong with Them" (featuring Nicki Minaj) | 2010 | 42 | — | — | — | 45 | — | — | — | 83 | | I Am Not a Human Being |
| "Popular" (featuring Lil Twist) | 2010 | — (Note: "Popular" did not enter the Billboard Hot 100, but peaked at number 13 on the Bubbling Under Hot 100 Singles chart, which acts as an extension to the Hot 100.) | — | — | — | — | — | — | — | — | | I Am Not a Human Being |
| "That Ain't Me" (featuring Jay Sean) | 2010 | — (Note: "That Ain't Me" did not enter the Billboard Hot 100, but peaked at number five on the Bubbling Under Hot 100 Singles chart, which acts as an extension to the Hot 100.) | — | — | — | — | — | — | — | 196 | | I Am Not a Human Being |
| "Bill Gates" | 2010 | 75 | — | — | — | — | — | — | — | — | | I Am Not a Human Being |
| "Martians vs. Goblins" (Game featuring Lil Wayne and Tyler, the Creator) | 2011 | 100 | — | — | — | — | — | — | — | — | | The R.E.D. Album |
| "Intro" | 2011 | — (Note: "Intro" did not enter the Billboard Hot 100, but peaked at number 17 on the Bubbling Under Hot 100 Singles chart, which acts as an extension to the Hot 100.) | — | — | — | — | — | — | — | — | | Tha Carter IV |
| "Blunt Blowin" | 2011 | 33 | — (Note: "Blunt Blowin" did not enter the Hot R&B/Hip-Hop Songs chart, but peaked at number one on the Bubbling Under R&B/Hip-Hop Singles chart, which acts as an extension to the R&B/Hip-Hop Songs chart.) | — | — | — | — | — | — | — | RIAA: 2× Platinum | Tha Carter IV |
| "MegaMan" | 2011 | 52 | 97 | — | — | — | — | — | — | — | | Tha Carter IV |
| "Nightmares of the Bottom" | 2011 | 90 | — | — | — | — | — | — | — | — | | Tha Carter IV |
| "How to Hate" (featuring T-Pain) | 2011 | 84 | — | — | — | — | — | — | — | — | | Tha Carter IV |
| "Interlude" (featuring Tech N9ne) | 2011 | — (Note: "Interlude" did not enter the Billboard Hot 100, but peaked at number 24 on the Bubbling Under Hot 100 Singles chart, which acts as an extension to the Hot 100.) | — | — | — | — | — | — | — | — | | Tha Carter IV |
| "So Special" (featuring John Legend) | 2011 | 95 | — | — | — | — | — | — | — | — | | Tha Carter IV |
| "President Carter" | 2011 | 94 | — | — | — | — | — | — | — | — | | Tha Carter IV |
| "Outro" (featuring Bun B, Nas, Shyne and Busta Rhymes) | 2011 | — (Note: "Outro" did not enter the Billboard Hot 100, but peaked at number three on the Bubbling Under Hot 100 Singles chart, which acts as an extension to the Hot 100.) | — | — | — | — | — | — | — | — | | Tha Carter IV |
| "I Like the View" | 2011 | — (Note: "I Like the View" did not enter the Billboard Hot 100, but peaked at number 11 on the Bubbling Under Hot 100 Singles chart, which acts as an extension to the Hot 100.) | — | — | — | — | — | — | — | — | | Tha Carter IV |
| "Two Shots" | 2011 | — (Note: "Two Shots" did not enter the Billboard Hot 100, but peaked at number nine on the Bubbling Under Hot 100 Singles chart, which acts as an extension to the Hot 100.) | — | — | — | — | — | — | — | — | | Tha Carter IV |
| "The Real Her" (Drake featuring Lil Wayne and André 3000) | 2011 | — (Note: "The Real Her" did not enter the Billboard Hot 100, but peaked at number four on the Bubbling Under Hot 100 Singles chart, which acts as an extension to the Hot 100.) | — | — | — | — | — | — | — | — | | Take Care |
| "Bang Bang Pow Pow" (T-Pain featuring Lil Wayne) | 2011 | 48 | — (Note: "Bang Bang Pow Pow" did not enter the Hot R&B/Hip-Hop Songs chart, but peaked at number two on the Bubbling Under R&B/Hip-Hop Singles chart, which acts as an extension to the R&B/Hip-Hop Songs chart.) | — | — | 83 | — | — | — | — | | Revolver |
| "When the Sun Comes Up" (Heidi Anne featuring T-Pain, Lil Wayne, Rick Ross and Glasses Malone) | 2012 | — | — | — | — | — | 76 | — | — | — | | Non-album song |
| "Let It Roll (Part 2)" (Flo Rida featuring Lil Wayne) | 2012 | — | — | — | 77 | — | — | — | — | — | | Wild Ones |
| "Hail Mary" (Trey Songz featuring Young Jeezy and Lil Wayne) | 2012 | — (Note: "Hail Mary" did not enter the Billboard Hot 100, but peaked at number six on the Bubbling Under Hot 100 Singles chart, which acts as an extension to the Hot 100.) | 77 | — | — | — | — | — | — | — | | Chapter V |
| "Yuck!" (2 Chainz featuring Lil Wayne) | 2012 | 80 | 48 | — | — | — | — | — | — | — | | Based on a T.R.U. Story |
| "Bitches & Bottles (Let's Get It Started)" (DJ Khaled featuring Lil Wayne, T.I. and Future) | 2012 | — (Note: "Bitches & Bottles (Let's Get It Started)" did not enter the Billboard Hot 100, but peaked at number nine on the Bubbling Under Hot 100 Singles chart, which acts as an extension to the Hot 100.) | — (Note: "Bitches & Bottles (Let's Get It Started)" did not enter the Hot R&B/Hip-Hop Songs chart, but peaked at number 24 on the Bubbling Under R&B/Hip-Hop Singles chart, which acts as an extension to the R&B/Hip-Hop Songs chart.) | — | — | — | — | — | — | — | | Kiss the Ring |
| "Curtains" (featuring Boo) | 2013 | — | — (Note: "Curtains" did not enter the Hot R&B/Hip-Hop Songs chart, but peaked at number one on the Bubbling Under R&B/Hip-Hop Singles chart, which acts as an extension to the R&B/Hip-Hop Songs chart.) | — | — | — | — | — | — | — | | I Am Not a Human Being II |
| "Days and Days" (featuring 2 Chainz) | 2013 | — (Note: "Days and Days" did not enter the Billboard Hot 100, but peaked at number eight on the Bubbling Under Hot 100 Singles chart, which acts as an extension to the Hot 100.) | 37 | — | — | — | — | — | — | — | | I Am Not a Human Being II |
| "Gunwalk" (featuring Gudda Gudda) | 2013 | — | 49 | — | — | — | — | — | — | — | | I Am Not a Human Being II |
| "Trigger Finger" (featuring Soulja Boy) | 2013 | — | — (Note: "Trigger Finger" did not enter the Hot R&B/Hip-Hop Songs chart, but peaked at number four on the Bubbling Under R&B/Hip-Hop Singles chart, which acts as an extension to the R&B/Hip-Hop Songs chart.) | — | — | — | — | — | — | — | | I Am Not a Human Being II |
| "Beat the Shit" (featuring Gunplay) | 2013 | — | — (Note: "Beat the Shit" did not enter the Hot R&B/Hip-Hop Songs chart, but peaked at number 10 on the Bubbling Under R&B/Hip-Hop Singles chart, which acts as an extension to the R&B/Hip-Hop Songs chart.) | — | — | — | — | — | — | — | | I Am Not a Human Being II |
| "Trippy" (featuring Juicy J) | 2013 | — (Note: "Trippy" did not enter the Billboard Hot 100, but peaked at number 14 on the Bubbling Under Hot 100 Singles chart, which acts as an extension to the Hot 100.) | 39 | — | — | — | — | — | — | — | | I Am Not a Human Being II |
| "God Bless Amerika" | 2013 | — | — (Note: "God Bless Amerika" did not enter the Hot R&B/Hip-Hop Songs chart, but peaked at number two on the Bubbling Under R&B/Hip-Hop Singles chart, which acts as an extension to the R&B/Hip-Hop Songs chart.) | — | — | — | — | — | — | — | | I Am Not a Human Being II |
| "Lay It Down" (featuring Nicki Minaj and Cory Gunz) | 2013 | — | — (Note: "Lay It Down" did not enter the Hot R&B/Hip-Hop Songs chart, but peaked at number eight on the Bubbling Under R&B/Hip-Hop Singles chart, which acts as an extension to the R&B/Hip-Hop Songs chart.) | — | — | — | — | — | — | — | | I Am Not a Human Being II |
| "500 Degrees" (Tyga featuring Lil Wayne) | 2013 | — (Note: "500 Degrees" did not enter the Billboard Hot 100, but peaked at number eight on the Bubbling Under Hot 100 Singles chart, which acts as an extension to the Hot 100.) | 39 | — | — | — | — | — | — | — | | Hotel California |
| "I Do It" (2 Chainz featuring Drake and Lil Wayne) | 2013 | 94 | 31 | 23 | — | — | — | — | — | — | | B.O.A.T.S. II: Me Time |
| "Senile" (Young Money featuring Tyga, Nicki Minaj and Lil Wayne) | 2014 | — | 50 | — | — | — | — | — | — | — | | Young Money: Rise of an Empire |
| "Moment" (Young Money featuring Lil Wayne) | 2014 | — | — (Note: "Moment" did not enter the Hot R&B/Hip-Hop Songs chart, but peaked at number seven on the Bubbling Under R&B/Hip-Hop Singles chart, which acts as an extension to the R&B/Hip-Hop Songs chart.) | — | — | — | — | — | — | — | | Young Money: Rise of an Empire |
| "Used To" (Drake featuring Lil Wayne) | 2015 | 84 | 29 | 17 | — | — | — | — | — | — | | If You're Reading This It's Too Late |
| "Deep" (Big Sean featuring Lil Wayne) | 2015 | — | 51 | — | — | — | — | — | — | — | | Dark Sky Paradise |
| "M'$" (A$AP Rocky featuring Lil Wayne) | 2015 | — (Note: "M'$" did not enter the Billboard Hot 100, but peaked at number six on the Bubbling Under Hot 100 Singles chart, which acts as an extension to the Hot 100.) | 41 | — | — | — | — | — | — | — | | At. Long. Last. A$AP |
| "Mad" (Solange featuring Lil Wayne) | 2016 | — (Note: "Mad" did not enter the Billboard Hot 100, but peaked at number nine on the Bubbling Under Hot 100 Singles chart, which acts as an extension to the Hot 100.) | 45 | — | — | — | — | — | — | — | | A Seat at the Table |
| "Dedicate" | 2018 | 14 | 11 | 11 | 91 | 26 | — | ― (Note: "Dedicate" did not enter the NZ Top 40 Singles Chart, but peaked at number nine on the NZ Hot Singles Chart.) | — | — | RIAA: Platinum | Tha Carter V |
| "Let It Fly" (featuring Travis Scott) | 2018 | 10 | 8 | 8 | 71 | 15 | — | ― (Note: "Let It Fly" did not enter the NZ Top 40 Singles Chart, but peaked at number five on the NZ Hot Singles Chart.) | 66 | 41 | RIAA: Platinum | Tha Carter V |
| "Can't Be Broken" | 2018 | 17 | 13 | 13 | — | 37 | — | — | — | — | RIAA: Platinum | Tha Carter V |
| "Dark Side of the Moon" (featuring Nicki Minaj) | 2018 | 26 | 19 | — | — | 55 | — | — | — | — | | Tha Carter V |
| "Mona Lisa" (featuring Kendrick Lamar) | 2018 | 2 | 1 | 1 | 42 | 7 | — | 39 | 36 | 21 | RIAA: 2× Platinum; RMNZ: Gold | Tha Carter V |
| "What About Me" (featuring Sosamann) | 2018 | 24 | 17 | 16 | 95 | 52 | — | — | — | — | | Tha Carter V |
| "Open Letter" | 2018 | 47 | 28 | 25 | — | 70 | — | — | — | — | | Tha Carter V |
| "Famous" (featuring Reginae Carter) | 2018 | 36 | 25 | 22 | — | 62 | — | — | — | — | | Tha Carter V |
| "Problems" | 2018 | 57 | 33 | — | — | 81 | — | — | — | — | | Tha Carter V |
| "Dope Niggaz" (featuring Snoop Dogg) | 2018 | 39 | 27 | 24 | — | 59 | — | — | — | — | | Tha Carter V |
| "Hittas" | 2018 | 59 | 34 | — | — | 90 | — | — | — | — | | Tha Carter V |
| "Took His Time" | 2018 | 65 | 38 | — | — | 96 | — | — | — | — | | Tha Carter V |
| "Open Safe" | 2018 | 62 | 36 | — | — | 87 | — | — | — | — | | Tha Carter V |
| "Start This Shit Off Right" (featuring Ashanti and Mack Maine) | 2018 | 76 | 42 | — | — | — | — | — | — | — | | Tha Carter V |
| "Demon" | 2018 | 81 | 45 | — | — | — | — | — | — | — | | Tha Carter V |
| "Mess" | 2018 | 74 | 40 | — | — | — | — | — | — | — | | Tha Carter V |
| "Dope New Gospel" (featuring Nivea) | 2018 | 90 | — | — | — | — | — | — | — | — | | Tha Carter V |
| "Perfect Strangers" | 2018 | 86 | 47 | — | — | — | — | — | — | — | | Tha Carter V |
| "Used 2" | 2018 | 78 | 43 | — | — | — | — | — | — | — | | Tha Carter V |
| "Let It All Work Out" (featuring Sampha) | 2018 | 75 | 41 | — | — | — | — | — | — | — | BPI: Silver; RMNZ: Gold | Tha Carter V |
| "Jealous" (DJ Khaled featuring Chris Brown, Big Sean and Lil Wayne) | 2019 | 57 | — | — | — | — | — | — | — | — | RIAA: Gold; ARIA: Gold | Father of Asahd |
| "Funeral" | 2020 | 88 | 41 | — | — | — | — | — | — | — | | Funeral |
| "Mahogany" | 2020 | 61 | 28 | — | — | — | — | ― (Note: "Mahogany" did not enter the NZ Top 40 Singles Chart, but peaked at number 36 on the NZ Hot Singles Chart.) | — | — | | Funeral |
| "Mama Mia" | 2020 | 87 | 40 | — | — | — | — | — | — | — | | Funeral |
| "Dreams" | 2020 | — (Note: "Dreams" did not enter the Billboard Hot 100, but peaked at number one on the Bubbling Under Hot 100 chart, which acts as an extension to the Hot 100.) | 50 | — | — | — | — | — | — | — | | Funeral |
| "Stop Playin with Me" | 2020 | — (Note: "Stop Playin with Me" did not enter the Billboard Hot 100, but peaked at number 11 on the Bubbling Under Hot 100 chart, which acts as an extension to the Hot 100.) | — | — | — | — | — | — | — | — | | Funeral |
| "Clap for Em" | 2020 | — (Note: "Clap for Em" did not enter the Billboard Hot 100, but peaked at number 15 on the Bubbling Under Hot 100 chart, which acts as an extension to the Hot 100.) | — | — | — | — | — | — | — | — | | Funeral |
| "Bing James" (featuring Jay Rock) | 2020 | — (Note: "Bing James" did not enter the Billboard Hot 100, but peaked at number seven on the Bubbling Under Hot 100 chart, which acts as an extension to the Hot 100.) | — | — | — | — | — | — | — | — | | Funeral |
| "Not Me" | 2020 | — (Note: "Not Me" did not enter the Billboard Hot 100, but peaked at number 18 on the Bubbling Under Hot 100 chart, which acts as an extension to the Hot 100.) | — | — | — | — | — | — | — | — | | Funeral |
| "I Don't Sleep" (featuring Takeoff) | 2020 | — (Note: "I Don't Sleep" did not enter the Billboard Hot 100, but peaked at number three on the Bubbling Under Hot 100 chart, which acts as an extension to the Hot 100.) | — | — | — | — | — | ― (Note: "I Don't Sleep" did not enter the NZ Top 40 Singles Chart, but peaked at number 37 on the NZ Hot Singles Chart.) | — | — | | Funeral |
| "Ball Hard" (featuring Lil Twist) | 2020 | — (Note: "Ball Hard" did not enter the Billboard Hot 100, but peaked at number 21 on the Bubbling Under Hot 100 chart, which acts as an extension to the Hot 100.) | — | — | — | — | — | — | — | — | | Funeral |
| "Forever" (Lil Baby featuring Lil Wayne) | 2020 | 64 | 34 | — | — | — | — | — | — | — | RIAA: Gold | My Turn |
| "My Window" (YoungBoy Never Broke Again featuring Lil Wayne) | 2020 | 35 | 14 | 13 | — | — | — | — | — | — | RIAA: Gold | Top |
| "Thankful" (DJ Khaled featuring Lil Wayne and Jeremih) | 2021 | 100 | 46 | — | — | — | — | — | — | — | | Khaled Khaled |
| "Seeing Green" (with Nicki Minaj and Drake) | 2021 | 12 | 8 | 6 | — | 27 | — | ― (Note: "Seeing Green" did not enter the NZ Top 40 Singles Chart, but peaked at number seven on the NZ Hot Singles Chart.) | — | 42 | | Beam Me Up Scotty |
| "Hot Wind Blows" (Tyler, the Creator featuring Lil Wayne) | 2021 | 48 | 19 | 16 | 58 | 49 | — | ― (Note: "Hot Wind Blows" did not enter the NZ Top 40 Singles Chart, but peaked at number eight on the NZ Hot Singles Chart.) | — | — | | Call Me If You Get Lost |
| "I Heard You're Married" (The Weeknd featuring Lil Wayne) | 2022 | 62 | 25 | — | 56 | 24 | — | — | — | — (Note: "I Heard You're Married" did not enter the UK Singles Chart, as chart rules only allow three songs per artist to chart within the top one hundred at a time, but peaked at number 67 on the Official UK Streaming chart.) | | Dawn FM |
| "Drug Dealer" (Machine Gun Kelly featuring Lil Wayne) | 2022 | — (Note: "Drug Dealer" did not enter the Billboard Hot 100, but peaked at number eight on the Bubbling Under Hot 100 chart, which acts as an extension to the Hot 100.) | — | — | — | 92 | — | ― (Note: "Drug Dealer" did not enter the NZ Top 40 Singles Chart, but peaked at number seven on the NZ Hot Singles Chart.) | — | — | | Mainstream Sellout |
| "Poison" (Jack Harlow featuring Lil Wayne) | 2022 | 99 | 29 | 25 | — | 72 | — | — | — | — | | Come Home the Kids Miss You |
| "God Did" (DJ Khaled featuring Rick Ross, Lil Wayne, Jay-Z, John Legend, and Fridayy) | 2022 | 17 | 6 | 3 | — | 29 | — | ― (Note: "God Did" did not enter the NZ Top 40 Singles Chart, but peaked at number 11 on the NZ Hot Singles Chart.) | — | 50 | | God Did |
| "Annihilate" (with Metro Boomin, Swae Lee, and Offset) | 2023 | 44 | 14 | 9 | 33 | 23 | — | 34 | — | 59 | ARIA: Gold | Spider-Man: Across the Spider-Verse (Soundtrack from and Inspired by the Motion Picture) |
| "To the Bank" (with Cool & Dre) | 2023 | — (Note: "To the Bank" did not enter the Billboard Hot 100, but peaked at number three on the Bubbling Under Hot 100 chart, which acts as an extension to the Hot 100.) | 35 | — | — | — | — | — | — | — | | Tha Fix Before Tha VI |
| "Big Diamonds" (with 2 Chainz featuring 21 Savage) | 2023 | — (Note: "Big Diamonds" did not enter the Billboard Hot 100, but peaked at number 19 on the Bubbling Under Hot 100 chart, which acts as an extension to the Hot 100.) | — | — | — | — | — | — (Note: "Big Diamonds" did not enter the NZ Top 40 Singles Chart, but peaked at number 36 on the NZ Hot Singles Chart.) | — | — | | Welcome 2 Collegrove |
| "Transparency" (with 2 Chainz featuring Usher) | 2023 | — (Note: "Transparency" did not enter the Billboard Hot 100, but peaked at number three on the Bubbling Under Hot 100 chart, which acts as an extension to the Hot 100.) | 35 | — | — | — | — | — (Note: "Transparency" did not enter the NZ Top 40 Singles Chart, but peaked at number 25 on the NZ Hot Singles Chart.) | — | — | | Welcome 2 Collegrove |
| "RNB" (Nicki Minaj featuring Lil Wayne and Tate Kobang) | 2023 | 80 | 22 | 18 | — | — | — | — | — | — | | Pink Friday 2 |
| "Lifestyle" (with Kanye West and Ty Dolla Sign as ¥$) | 2024 | — | 41 | — | — | — | — | — | — | — | | Vultures 2 |
| "King Carter" | 2025 | 97 | — | — | — | — | — | — | — | — | | Tha Carter VI |
| "Welcome to Tha Carter" | 2025 | 62 | 16 | 9 | — | — | — | — (Note: "Welcome to Tha Carter" did not enter the NZ Top 40 Singles Chart, but peaked at number 22 on the NZ Hot Singles Chart.) | — | — | | Tha Carter VI |
| "Bells" | 2025 | 65 | 18 | 11 | — | — | — | — (Note: "Bells" did not enter the NZ Top 40 Singles Chart, but peaked at number 31 on the NZ Hot Singles Chart.) | — | — | | Tha Carter VI |
| "Hip-Hop" (with BigXthaPlug featuring Jay Jones) | 2025 | 36 | 8 | 5 | — | — | — | — (Note: "Hip-Hop" did not enter the NZ Top 40 Singles Chart, but peaked at number 18 on the NZ Hot Singles Chart.) | — | — | | Tha Carter VI |
| "Sharks" (with Jelly Roll and Big Sean) | 2025 | 54 | 12 | 7 | — | — | — | — (Note: "Hip-Hop" did not enter the NZ Top 40 Singles Chart, but peaked at number 38 on the NZ Hot Singles Chart.) | — | — | | Tha Carter VI |
| "Banned from NO" | 2025 | 61 | 15 | 8 | — | — | — | — | — | — | | Tha Carter VI |
| "The Days" (with Bono) | 2025 | — (Note: "The Days" did not enter the Billboard Hot 100, but peaked at number 12 on the Bubbling Under Hot 100 chart, which acts as an extension to the Hot 100.) | 29 | 21 | — | — | — | — | — | — | | Tha Carter VI |
| "Cotton Candy" (with 2 Chainz) | 2025 | 93 | 23 | 16 | — | — | — | — | — | — | | Tha Carter VI |
| "Flex Up" | 2025 | — (Note: "Flex Up" did not enter the Billboard Hot 100, but peaked at number 2 on the Bubbling Under Hot 100 chart, which acts as an extension to the Hot 100.) | 26 | 18 | — | — | — | — | — | — | | Tha Carter VI |
| "Island Holiday" | 2025 | — (Note: "Island Holiday" did not enter the Billboard Hot 100, but peaked at number 5 on the Bubbling Under Hot 100 chart, which acts as an extension to the Hot 100.) | 27 | 19 | — | — | — | — | — | — | | Tha Carter VI |
| "Loki's Theme" | 2025 | — (Note: "Loki's Theme" did not enter the Billboard Hot 100, but peaked at number 17 on the Bubbling Under Hot 100 chart, which acts as an extension to the Hot 100.) | 31 | 23 | — | — | — | — | — | — | | Tha Carter VI |
| "If I Played Guitar" | 2025 | — | 36 | — | — | — | — | — | — | — | | Tha Carter VI |
| "Peanuts 2 N Elephant" | 2025 | — | 34 | 25 | — | — | — | — | — | — | | Tha Carter VI |
| "Rari" (with Kameron Carter) | 2025 | — | 47 | — | — | — | — | — | — | — | | Tha Carter VI |
| "Maria" (featuring Andrea Bocelli and Wyclef Jean) | 2025 | — | 46 | — | — | — | — | — | — | — | | Tha Carter VI |
| "Bein Myself" (featuring Mannie Fresh) | 2025 | — | 39 | — | — | — | — | — | — | — | | Tha Carter VI |
| "Alone in the Studio with My Gun" (with MGK and Kodak Black) | 2025 | — | 35 | — | — | — | — | — | — | — | | Tha Carter VI |
| "Written History" | 2025 | — | 38 | — | — | — | — | — | — | — | | Tha Carter VI |
"—" denotes a recording that did not chart or was not released in that territory.

== Guest appearances ==
List of single, non-single guest appearances, with other performing artists, showing year released and album name
| Title | Year | Other performer(s) | Album |
|---|---|---|---|
| "Hide Out or Ride Out" | 1997 | Juvenile, Turk | Solja Rags |
| "Ride 2'Night" | 1997 | B.G., Keisha, Turk, Bulletproof | It's All on U, Vol. 1 |
| "Let's Get Funky" | 1997 | B.G. | It's All on U, Vol. 1 |
| "Hot Boys 226" | 1997 | B.G., U.N.L.V., Juvenile | It's All on U, Vol. 2 |
| "Ride or Die" | 1997 | B.G., Juvenile | It's All on U, Vol. 2 |
| "I'm Try'n" | 1997 | B.G., Juvenile | It's All on U, Vol. 2 |
| "Big Tymers (Intro)" | 1998 | Big Tymers, Bulletproof | How You Luv That / How You Luv That Vol. 2 |
| "Playboy (Don't Hate Me)" | 1998 | Big Tymers, Bun B | How You Luv That / How You Luv That Vol. 2 |
| "Tear It Up" | 1998 | Big Tymers, B.G. | How You Luv That / How You Luv That Vol. 2 |
| "How U Luv That?" | 1998 | Big Tymers, Juvenile | How You Luv That / How You Luv That Vol. 2 |
| "Cutlass, Monte Carlo's & Regals" | 1998 | Big Tymers, Juvenile | How You Luv That / How You Luv That Vol. 2 |
| "Millionaire Dream" | 1998 | Big Tymers, Cadillac | How You Luv That / How You Luv That Vol. 2 |
| "Top of the Line Nigga" | 1998 | Big Tymers | How You Luv That / How You Luv That Vol. 2 |
| "Suga & Pac, Puff & Big (6 Fig)" | 1998 | Big Tymers, B.G. | How You Luv That / How You Luv That Vol. 2 |
| "Drivin' Em" | 1998 | Big Tymers, Larell | How You Luv That / How You Luv That Vol. 2 |
| "Stun'n" (Remix) | 1998 | Big Tymers, Paparue | How You Luv That Vol. 2 |
| "Flossin' Season" | 1998 | Juvenile, Big Tymers, B.G. | 400 Degreez |
| "Run for It" | 1998 | Juvenile | 400 Degreez |
| "Rich Niggaz" | 1998 | Juvenile, Mannie Fresh, Turk, Paparue | 400 Degreez |
| "Bring da Pain" | 1999 | Blaxuede, Turk | Dey Don't Know |
| "Niggaz in Trouble" | 1999 | B.G., Juvenile | Chopper City in the Ghetto |
| "Rally Up" | 1999 | Rally Boys, Big Tymers | Rally World Vol. 1 |
| "Who Can I Trust" | 1999 | Cormega | Violator: The Album |
| "Play That Shit" | 1999 | Noreaga, Juvenile, Musalini Maze, Goldfingaz | Melvin Flynt – Da Hustler |
| "Ballers" (Cash Money Remix) | 1999 | Project Pat, Turk, Baby, Juvenile | Ghetty Green |
| "U-Way (How We Do It)" (Remix) | 1999 | YoungBloodZ | Against da Grain |
| "G-Code" | 1999 | Juvenile | Tha G-Code |
| "Lil' Boys" | 1999 | Juvenile, Big Tymers | Tha G-Code |
| "Get It Right" | 1999 | Juvenile, B.G. | Tha G-Code |
| "Look at Me" | 1999 | E-40, Birdman, Juvenile, B.G. | Charlie Hustle: The Blueprint of a Self-Made Millionaire |
| "Respect" | 1999 | Funkmaster Flex, Big Kap, Mannie Fresh, B.G. | The Tunnel |
| "Good Friday" | 1999 | Big Tymers, Mack 10 | Next Friday soundtrack |
| "Hey Ya" | 2000 | Strings | The Black Widow |
| "Nigga Couldn't Know" | 2000 | Big Tymers | I Got That Work |
| "No, No" | 2000 | Big Tymers | I Got That Work |
| "Sunday Night" | 2000 | Big Tymers | I Got That Work |
| "Hard Life" | 2000 | Big Tymers, Juvenile | I Got That Work |
| "For My" | 2000 | Nelly | Country Grammar |
| "Calling Me Killer" | 2000 | —N/a | Baller Blockin' (soundtrack) |
| "I Don't Know" (Unplugged) | 2000 | Cash Money Millionaires | Baller Blockin' (soundtrack) |
| "Dem Boyz" | 2000 | Willie D, Scarface | Loved by Few, Hated by Many |
| "Why U Treat Me So Cold" | 2000 | Keith Sweat | Didn't See Me Coming |
| "U Know How We Do" | 2000 | B.G. | Checkmate |
| "Change the World" | 2000 | B.G., Big Tymers, Juvenile | Checkmate |
| "Steady Grinding" | 2001 | Mack 10, Baby, Turk, Juvenile | Exit Wounds (soundtrack) |
| "Sunshine" | 2001 | Juvenile, Big Tymers, B.G. | Project English |
| "White Girl" | 2001 | Juvenile, Birdman | Project English |
| "Set It Off" (Radio Remix) | 2001 | Juvenile, Birdman, Turk | Project English |
| "What U Scared 4" | 2001 | Juvenile | Project English |
| "Yes We Do" | 2001 | Turk, B.G., Mack 10 | Young & Thuggin' |
| "All Night" | 2001 | Turk | Young & Thuggin' |
| "Ya Ya Ya" | 2001 | Nivea | Nivea |
| "Let the Thugs in the Club" | 2001 | Mack 10, B.G. | Bang or Ball |
| "Grindin'" (Remix) | 2002 | Clipse, Birdman, N.O.R.E. | Lord Willin' |
| "Real Talk" | 2002 | —N/a | Undisputed soundtrack |
| "I Got To" | 2002 | Birdman | Birdman |
| "Ghetto Life" | 2002 | Birdman, Cam'ron, TQ | Birdman |
| "This Goes Out" | 2003 | Murphy Lee, Nelly, Roscoe, Cardan, Lil Jon | Murphy's Law |
| "Southern Boy" | 2003 | Big Tymers, Bun B | Big Money Heavyweight |
| "Down South" | 2003 | Big Tymers, Ludacris, Jazze Pha | Big Money Heavyweight |
| "26's" | 2004 | Chingy | Powerballin' |
| "Trance" | 2004 | Lloyd | Southside |
| "We Fresh" | 2004 | Mannie Fresh | The Mind of Mannie Fresh |
| "Lady Lady" | 2004 | Mannie Fresh | The Mind of Mannie Fresh |
| "Stand Up" | 2004 | T.I., Lil Jon, Trick Daddy | Urban Legend |
| "6 Minutes" | 2005 | Cassidy, Fabolous | I'm a Hustla |
| "Shovlin' Snow" | 2005 | Birdman, Currensy, Mack Maine | Fast Money |
| "Get It All Together" | 2005 | Birdman | Fast Money |
| "4 Flat Tires" | 2005 | Miri Ben-Ari, Birdman, 6 Shot | The Hip-Hop Violinist |
| "March 'n' Step" | 2005 | Paul Wall | The Peoples Champ |
| "Fly as the Sky" | 2005 | Chamillionaire, Rasaq | The Sound of Revenge |
| "Make It Work for You" | 2005 | Juelz Santana, Young Jeezy | What the Game's Been Missing! |
| "I'm with Whateva" | 2005 | The Notorious B.I.G., Jim Jones, Juelz Santana | Duets: The Final Chapter |
| "MIA" | 2006 | DJ Khaled | Listennn... the Album |
| "Gettin' Some" (Remix) | 2006 | Shawnna, Ludacris, Pharrell, Too $hort | Block Music |
| "I'm a G" | 2006 | Rick Ross, Brisco | Port of Miami |
| "All Night Long" | 2006 | Robin Thicke | The Evolution of Robin Thicke |
| "Weather Man" | 2006 | Jim Jones, Stack Bundles | Hustler's P.O.M.E. (Product of My Environment) |
| "The Profit" | 2006 | Fat Joe | Me, Myself & I |
| "4 Corners" | 2006 | Bow Wow, Lil Scrappy, Pimp C, Short Dawg | The Price of Fame |
| "Clear da Scene" | 2006 | DJ Clue?, Rick Ross, Ransom | The Professional 3 |
| "Lil' Girl Gone" | 2007 | Devin the Dude, Bun B | Waitin' to Inhale |
| "Brown Paper Bag" | 2007 | DJ Khaled, Young Jeezy, Dre, Juelz Santana, Fat Joe | We the Best |
| "S on My Chest" | 2007 | DJ Khaled, Birdman | We the Best |
| "Whip Game Proper" | 2007 | Twista | Adrenaline Rush 2007 |
| "It's Me...(Remix)" | 2007 | Swizz Beatz, R. Kelly, Jadakiss | One Man Band Man |
| "Barry Bonds" | 2007 | Kanye West | Graduation |
| "Gimme Whatcha Got" | 2007 | Chris Brown | Exclusive |
| "Rock Star" | 2007 | Chamillionaire | Ultimate Victory |
| "Hello Brooklyn 2.0" | 2007 | Jay-Z | American Gangster |
| "Cannon" (Remix) | 2007 | DJ Drama, Willie the Kid, Freeway, T.I. | Gangsta Grillz: The Album |
| "Believe That" | 2007 | Birdman | 5 * Stunna |
| "Grind" | 2007 | Birdman, Brisco | 5 * Stunna |
| "Make Way" | 2007 | Birdman, Fat Joe | 5 * Stunna |
| "So Tired" | 2007 | Birdman | 5 * Stunna |
| "Big Dog Status" (Remix) | 2007 | Scarface | Non-album singles |
| "This Ain't a Scene, It's an Arms Race" (Remix) | 2007 | Fall Out Boy, Kanye West, Travis McCoy, Paul Wall, Skinhead Rob, Tyga, Lupe Fiasco | Non-album singles |
| "Breakin' My Heart" | 2007 | Little Brother | Getback |
| "Crank That" (Remix) | 2008 | Soulja Boy | Non-album single |
| "Luxury Tax" | 2008 | Rick Ross, Young Jeezy, Trick Daddy | Trilla |
| "The Crackhouse" | 2008 | Fat Joe | The Elephant in the Room |
| "American Superstar" | 2008 | Flo Rida | Mail on Sunday |
| "I Am" | 2008 | Tyga | No Introduction |
| "Damn I'm Cold" | 2008 | Bun B | II Trill |
| "See You in My Nightmares" | 2008 | Kanye West | 808s & Heartbreak |
| "Number One" | 2008 | Jamie Foxx | Intuition |
| "Girlfriend Ringtone" | 2008 | Sean Garrett | Turbo 919 |
| "Last of a Dying Breed" | 2008 | Ludacris | Theater of the Mind |
| "Forgot About Me" | 2008 | Scarface, Bun B | Emeritus |
| "President Carter Speaks" | 2008 | Nicki Minaj | Sucka Free |
| "Tiffany Blews" | 2008 | Fall Out Boy | Folie à Deux |
| "Forever" (Remix) | 2008 | Chris Brown, Lupe Fiasco | Non-album single |
| "Mr. Carter 2" | 2009 | Kendrick Lamar | C4 |
| "Colors" | 2009 | Jay Rock, Kendrick Lamar | 30 Day Takeover |
| "Throw It Back" | 2009 | Mack Maine | This is Just a Mixtape |
| "AK-47" | 2009 | Mack Maine | This is Just a Mixtape |
| "This is Just a Mixtape" | 2009 | Mack Maine | This is Just a Mixtape |
| "Let It Rock" (Remix) | 2009 | Mack Maine, Kevin Rudolf, Birdman | This is Just a Mixtape |
| "Ups and Downs" | 2009 | Young Buck | Back on My Buck Shit |
| "I Get Crazy" | 2009 | Nicki Minaj | Beam Me Up Scotty |
| "Go Hard" | 2009 | Nicki Minaj | Beam Me Up Scotty |
| "Salute" | 2009 | Fabolous | Loso's Way |
| "Uptown" | 2009 | Drake, Bun B | So Far Gone |
| "Winding on Me" | 2009 | Fat Joe, Ron Browz | Jealous Ones Still Envy 2 (J.O.S.E. 2) |
| "Can't Stop Partying" | 2009 | Weezer | Raditude |
| "Done It Now" | 2009 | T.I. | A Year and a Day |
| "Priceless" | 2009 | Birdman | Priceless |
| "Bring It Back" | 2009 | Birdman | Priceless |
| "Hustle" | 2009 | Birdman, Gudda Gudda | Priceless |
| "I Want It All" | 2009 | Birdman, Kevin Rudolf | Priceless |
| "Always Strapped" (Remix) | 2009 | Birdman, Mack Maine | Priceless |
| "Southside" (Remix) | 2009 | Birdman, Mack Maine, Rick Ross | Priceless |
| "Stupid Wild" | 2009 | Gucci Mane, Cam'ron | The State vs. Radric Davis |
| "Wasted" (Remix) | 2009 | Gucci Mane, Jadakiss, Birdman | The State vs. Radric Davis |
| "All 4 U" | 2009 | Missy Elliott | Block Party |
| "Currency" | 2010 | Trina, Rick Ross | Amazin' |
| "Whip It Like a Slave" | 2010 | Boo Rossini, Yo Gotti | 601 to the 615 |
| "Willy Wonka" | 2010 | Gudda Gudda | Back 2 Guddaville |
| "Small Thing to a Giant" | 2010 | Gudda Gudda | Back 2 Guddaville |
| "Money or Graveyard" | 2010 | Gudda Gudda | Back 2 Guddaville |
| "Spit in Your Face" | 2010 | Kevin Rudolf | To the Sky |
| "Heavenly Father" | 2010 | Fat Joe | The Darkside Vol. 1 |
| "My Generation" | 2010 | Nas & Damien Marley | Distant Relatives |
| "Shades" | 2010 | Diddy – Dirty Money, Justin Timberlake, Bilal, James Fauntleroy | Last Train to Paris |
| "Strobe Lights" | 2010 | Diddy – Dirty Money | Last Train to Paris |
| "Fuck Food" | 2011 | Tech N9ne, Krizz Kaliko, T-Pain | All 6's and 7's |
| "That's Not Luv" | 2011 | Trae | Street King |
| "Dear Anne" | 2011 | —N/a | Monster Mondays Vol. 1 |
| "Ima Stunt" | 2011 | Bow Wow, 2 Chainz | Greenlight 4 |
| "Martians vs. Goblins" | 2011 | Game, Tyler, The Creator | The R.E.D. Album |
| "Bang Bang Pow Pow" | 2011 | T-Pain | Revolver |
| "Grapes on a Vine" | 2011 | Betty Wright, The Roots | Betty Wright: The Movie |
| "The Real Her" | 2011 | Drake, André 3000 | Take Care |
| "Just in Love" | 2011 | Joe Jonas | Fastlife |
| "Why Stop Now" (Remix) | 2012 | Busta Rhymes, Missy Elliott, Chris Brown | Non-album single |
| "Lay You Down" | 2012 | Tyga | Careless World: Rise of the Last King |
| "The Question" | 2012 | Mac Miller | Macadelic |
| "Sex in the Lounge" | 2012 | Nicki Minaj, Bobby V | Pink Friday: Roman Reloaded |
| "Cyeah Cyeah Cyeah Cyeah" | 2012 | Gucci Mane, Chris Brown | I'm Up |
| "Let It Roll" (Part 2) | 2012 | Flo Rida | Wild Ones |
| "Jet Life" (Remix) | 2012 | Currensy, Big K.R.I.T., Young Jeezy | Non-album singles |
| "60 Rackz" (Remix) | 2012 | Jim Jones, Cam'ron | Non-album singles |
| "Yuck!" | 2012 | 2 Chainz | Based on a T.R.U. Story |
| "Bag of Money" (Remix) | 2012 | Wale, Rick Ross, T-Pain, Omarion, Yo Gotti, French Montana, Black Cobain | Non-album singles |
| "Bag of Money" (Remix) | 2012 | Wale, Rick Ross, Omarion, French Montana, Lil Wayne, Yo Gotti, Black Cobain, Trina, Tyga, Rockie Fresh | Non-album singles |
| "Bitches & Bottles (Let's Get It Started)" | 2012 | DJ Khaled, T.I., Future | Kiss the Ring |
| "Pressure" | 2012 | Busta Rhymes | Year of the Dragon |
| "Hail Mary" | 2012 | Trey Songz, Young Jeezy | Chapter V |
| "Work Hard, Play Hard" (Remix) | 2012 | Wiz Khalifa, Young Jeezy | Non-album single |
| "Night & Day" | 2012 | Lloyd, Trae Tha Truth, DJ Scream | The Playboy Diaries Vol. 1 |
| "Flowerz" | 2012 | Lil Twist, Chris Brown | Don't Get It Twisted |
| "Hold Me Back" (Remix) | 2012 | Rick Ross, Gunplay, French Montana, Yo Gotti | Non-album single |
| "As Da World Turns" | 2012 | Gudda Gudda, Mack Maine | Guddaville 3 |
| "Last Night" | 2012 | Paris Hilton | Non-album single |
| "Zip It" | 2012 | Turk, Juvenile, B.G. | Blame It on the System |
| "Picture Perfect" | 2012 | Juvenile, Birdman | Juvie Tuesdays |
| "The Party Anthem" | 2013 | Timbaland, Missy Elliott, T-Pain | Non-album single |
| "Black Out" | 2013 | Juelz Santana | God Will'n |
| "Eat the Cake" | 2013 | Bow Wow, DJ Khaled | Greenlight 5 |
| "Stay Hood" | 2013 | Waka Flocka Flame | DuFlocka Rant 2 |
| "Bullet Wound" | 2013 | Gucci Mane, Young Scooter | Trap God 2 |
| "Runnin' Circles" | 2013 | Gucci Mane | Trap God 2 |
| "8am" | 2013 | I.Z. aka IDzeroNo, Sacario | Non-album singles |
| "Commas" | 2013 | L.E.P. Bogus Boys, Mase | Non-album singles |
| "500 Degrees" | 2013 | Tyga | Hotel California |
| "She Tried" | 2013 | N.O.R.E. | Student of the Game |
| "Love to a Diplomat" | 2013 | Funkmaster Flex, Cam'ron | Who You Mad At? Me or Yourself? |
| "Buy This Buy That" | 2013 | Funkmaster Flex, Jae Millz | Who You Mad At? Me or Yourself? |
| "Lover" | 2013 | PJ Morton | New Orleans |
| "Party Girl" | 2013 | Asher Roth | The Greenhouse Effect Vol. 2 |
| "Bigger Than Life" | 2013 | Birdman, Chris Brown, Tyga | Rich Gang |
| "Angel" | 2013 | Mystikal, Jae Millz, Ace Hood, Gudda Gudda, Birdman, Mack Maine | Rich Gang |
| "Paint tha Town" | 2013 | Birdman, Game | Rich Gang |
| "Have It Your Way" | 2013 | Birdman, T.I. | Rich Gang |
| "Hands Up" | 2013 | Swizz Beatz, Nicki Minaj, Rick Ross, 2 Chainz | Non-album single |
| "I Do It" | 2013 | 2 Chainz, Drake | B.O.A.T.S. II: Me Time |
| "Space Jam" | 2013 | Audio Push | Come As You Are |
| "F.I.V.E." | 2013 | The Game, Chris Brown | OKE: Operation Kill Everything |
| "No Motive" | 2013 | DJ Khaled | Suffering from Success |
| "Good Day" | 2013 | Tyga, Meek Mill | Well Done 4 |
| "Fuck Yo Feelings" | 2014 | Game, Chris Brown | Blood Moon: Year of the Wolf |
| "Think I'm Lyin" | 2014 | Hood, Tyga | Kitchen 24 |
| "Errrbody" (Remix) | 2014 | Yo Gotti, Ludacris | Non-album single |
| "Renaissance Rap" (Remix) | 2014 | Busta Rhymes, Q-Tip | The Abstract and the Dragon |
| "Take Kare" | 2014 | Young Thug | Slime Season |
| "Face Down" | 2014 | DJ Mustard, Boosie Badazz, Big Sean, YG | 10 Summers |
| "About the Money" (Remix) | 2014 | T.I., Young Thug, Jeezy | |
| "Joker" | 2014 | Beth Sherburn | |
| "After That" | 2014 | Future | Monster |
| "Deep" | 2015 | Big Sean | Dark Sky Paradise |
| "Used 2" | 2015 | Drake | If You're Reading This It's Too Late |
| "Smuckers" | 2015 | Tyler, The Creator, Kanye West | Cherry Bomb |
| "M's" | 2015 | ASAP Rocky | At. Long. Last. ASAP |
| "I Ain't Gonna Lie" | 2015 | French Montana | Casino Life 2: Brown Bag Legend |
| "Bass Ackwards" | 2015 | Tech N9ne, Yo Gotti, Big Scoob | Special Effects |
| "4 My Dawgs" | 2015 | Tyga | The Gold Album: 18th Dynasty |
| "Miss Mary Mack" | 2015 | Juicy J | 100%% Juice |
| "Ejected" | 2015 | Kidd Kidd | Fuk da Famę |
| "We Hustle" | 2015 | Freekey Zekey, Chad B, Tito Green | American Dream |
| "Locked Away Again" (Remix) | 2015 | R. City, Adam Levine | Non-album single |
| "Let Me Thru" | 2015 | T-Pain | The Iron Way |
| "From Adam" | 2015 | The Game | The Documentary 2.5 |
| "Kill" | 2015 | Jadakiss | Top 5 Dead or Alive |
| "3 Way Freak" | 2015 | Pimp C | Long Live the Pimp |
| "Smell Like Money" | 2016 | 2 Chainz | ColleGrove |
| "Blue C-Note" | 2016 | 2 Chainz | ColleGrove |
| "Bentley Truck" | 2016 | 2 Chainz | ColleGrove |
| "Rolls Royce Weather Everyday" | 2016 | 2 Chainz | ColleGrove |
| "What Happened" | 2016 | 2 Chainz | ColleGrove |
| "Section" | 2016 | 2 Chainz | ColleGrove |
| "Barely Sober" | 2016 | Belly | Another Day in Paradise |
| "Tourist" | 2016 | DJ Khaled, Travis Scott | Major Key |
| "I Got a Question" | 2016 | YG | Still Brazy |
| "Spend It" (Remix) | 2016 | Dae Dae. 2 Chainz | Non-album singles |
| "How to Get It" | 2016 | Hypnotiq | Non-album singles |
| "Pillowtalk" (Remix) | 2016 | Zayn Malik | Non-album singles |
| "Mad" | 2016 | Solange | A Seat at the Table |
| "Oh Lord" | 2016 | Gucci Mane | The Birth of a Nation (soundtrack) |
| "Bout That" | 2016 | Jeezy | Trap or Die 3 |
| "Bible" | 2016 | Yo Gotti | The Art of Hustle |
| "Tape Beat" | 2016 | Hodgy | Fireplace: TheNotTheOtherSide |
| "Loyal to the Soil" | 2016 | Dame D.O.L.L.A. | The Letter "O" |
| "Gold" (Remix) | 2016 | Kiiara | Non-album single |
| "My Corner" | 2017 | Raekwon | The Wild |
| "Location" (Remix) | 2017 | Khalid, Kehlani | Non-album single |
| "Faith" | 2017 | Mike Will Made It, HoodyBaby | Ransom 2 |
| "First Class" | 2017 | HoodyBaby | Kitchen 24: Slangin Off Key |
| "Act Ghetto" | 2017 | Tyga | Non-album single |
| "Nerve" | 2017 | Lil Twist, Fooly Faime | Young Carter |
| "Both" (Remix) | 2017 | Gucci Mane, Drake | Non-album single |
| "E.T." | 2017 | B.o.B | Ether |
| "Love U Better" | 2017 | Ty Dolla $ign, The-Dream | Beach House 3 |
| "Army Green & Navy Blue" | 2017 | Juicy J | Gas Face |
| "Lonely" | 2017 | Demi Lovato | Tell Me You Love Me |
| "Droppin' Seeds" | 2017 | Tyler, the Creator | Flower Boy |
| "Go Crazy" | 2017 | Jay Jones | 2000 Hollygrove |
| "Scared of the Dark" | 2018 | Ty Dolla Sign, XXXTentacion | Spider-Man: Into the Spider-Verse (soundtrack) |
| "End of Discussion" | 2018 | Rich the Kid | The World Is Yours |
| "Mula" (Remix) | 2018 | Zoey Dollaz | Non-album singles |
| "Fuk How It Turn Out (G-Mix)" | 2018 | Turk, Kodak Black | Non-album singles |
| "Hot Boy" | 2018 | Preme | Light of Day |
| "Wit My Left" | 2018 | Fendi P | Late Nights, Early Mornings |
| "Drive Itself" | 2018 | Future | Superfly (soundtrack) |
| "Fires & Desires" | 2018 | Lil Twist, Trippie Redd | Young Carter 2 |
| "Blood Pressure" | 2018 | Freeway | Think Free |
| "Oxy" | 2018 | Future, Juice Wrld | Wrld on Drugs |
| "Rude Boi" | 2018 | Bun B | Return of the Trill |
| "Talk to Me (Remix)" | 2018 | Tory Lanez, Rich the Kid, DJ Stevie J | Non-album single |
| "YUSO" | 2018 | Kid Ink, Saweetie | Missed Calls |
| "Goat Talk" | 2019 | T-Pain | 1UP |
| "Genius" (Lil Wayne Remix) | 2019 | LSD | Labrinth, Sia & Diplo Present... LSD |
| "2 Dolla Bill" | 2019 | 2 Chainz, E-40 | Rap or Go to the League |
| "Freak N You" | 2019 | DJ Khaled, Gunna | Father of Asahd |
| "Jealous" | 2019 | DJ Khaled, Chris Brown | Father of Asahd |
| "T-Shirt" | 2019 | PnB Rock | TrapStar Turnt PopStar |
| "I Will Not Break" | 2019 | Kevin Rudolf | Non-album singles |
| "Sucka Free" | 2019 | Jozzy | Non-album singles |
| "On Me" | 2019 | Tyga | Legendary |
| "Situation" | 2019 | Trina | The One |
| "Addiction" | 2019 | Big K.R.I.T., Saweetie | K.R.I.T. Iz Here |
| "Believer" (Remix) | 2019 | Imagine Dragons | Non-album single |
| "Need a Stack" | 2019 | Chris Brown, Joyner Lucas | Indigo |
| "Maybach Music VI" | 2019 | Rick Ross, John Legend | Port of Miami 2 |
| "Sorry" | 2019 | Dame D.O.L.L.A. | BIG D.O.L.L.A. |
| "Ride Dat" | 2019 | Birdman, Juvenile | Non-album single |
| "They Want My Blood" | 2019 | DJ Kay Slay Busta Rhymes | Hip Hop Frontline |
| "Lucy's Love" | 2019 | SiR | Chasing Summer |
| "Talk 2 Me Crazy" | 2019 | Euro | Don't Expect Nothing |
| "Kitten" | 2019 | Kash Doll | Stacked |
| "Thoughts" | 2019 | Tory Lanez, Lloyd | Chixtape 5 |
| "Leaked" (Remix) | 2019 | Lil Tjay | True 2 Myself |
| "School Shooters" | 2019 | XXXTentacion | Bad Vibes Forever |
| "Count on You" (Remix) | 2020 | Love Mansuy | Non-album singles |
| "Boiling Water" | 2020 | Juelz Santana, 2 Chainz | Non-album singles |
| "Silence of the Lambs (S.O.T.L.)" | 2020 | Ludacris | Non-album singles |
| "Ferrari" | 2020 | Anuel AA | Emmanuel |
| "Forever" | 2020 | Lil Baby | My Turn |
| "Don Life" | 2020 | Big Sean | Detroit 2 |
| "My Window" | 2020 | YoungBoy Never Broke Again | Top |
| "Blood Walk" | 2020 | YG, D3szn | My Life 4Hunnid |
| "Hell Rain" | 2020 | Trippie Redd, HoodyBaby | Pegasus |
| "Body Bag" | 2020 | Rich the Kid, YoungBoy Never Broke Again | Nobody Safe |
| "Resent" | 2020 | August Alsina, Juicy J | The Product III |
| "Oops" (Remix) | 2021 | Yung Gravy | Non-album singles |
| "Call Me Nobody" | 2021 | Clever, Isaiah | Non-album singles |
| "Cookin' Up" | 2021 | Alonestar | Non-album singles |
| "Perfect" (Remix) | 2021 | Logic, A$AP Ferg | Non-album singles |
| "Dogs Out" | 2021 | DMX, Swizz Beatz | Exodus |
| "Hot Wind Blows" | 2021 | Tyler, the Creator | Call Me If You Get Lost |
| "Too Good" | 2021 | Tech N9ne, Mumu Freshman | Asin9ne |
| "Control the World" | 2021 | 24kGoldn | Space Jam: A New Legacy soundtrack |
| "Thankful" | 2021 | DJ Khaled | Khaled Khaled |
| "You Only Live Twice" | 2021 | Drake, Rick Ross | Certified Lover Boy |
| "When You're Gone" | 2021 | G-Eazy | These Things Happen Too |
| "Ritual" | 2021 | AZ, Conway the Machine | Do or Die II |
| "ooh la la" (Remix) | 2021 | Run the Jewels, Greg Nice, DJ Premier | RTJ4 (deluxe edition) |
| "Nat King Cole" | 2021 | Alicia Keys | Keys |
| "Bash Money" | 2021 | Westside Gunn | Hitler Wears Hermes VIII: Sincerely, Adolf |
| "I Heard You're Married" | 2022 | The Weeknd | Dawn FM |
| "Tear Gas" | 2022 | Conway the Machine, Rick Ross | God Don't Make Mistakes |
| "Thought I Was Gonna Stop" | 2022 | Papoose | September EP |
| "Poison" | 2022 | Jack Harlow | Come Home the Kids Miss You |
| "Possessive" | 2022 | Chris Brown, Yung Bleu | Breezy |
| "Soul Child" | 2022 | Yung Bleu | Tantra |
| "Never Fake It" | 2022 | T-Docc | Non-album song |
| "Make Our Move" | 2022 | YFN Lucci, Chief Keef | Non-album single |
| "Chrome Slugs & Harmony" | 2022 | The Game, G Herbo | Drillmatic – Heart vs. Mind |
| "God Did" | 2022 | DJ Khaled, Rick Ross, Jay-Z, John Legend, Fridayy | God Did |
| "The Root of It All" | 2022 | DJ Premier, Slick Rick | Hip Hop 50: Volume 1 |
| "Just in Time" | 2022 | JID, Kenny Mason | The Forever Story |
| "Opening Theme" | 2022 | Run the Jewels | Aqua Teen Forever: Plantasm (soundtrack) |
| "Annihilate" | 2023 | Metro Boomin, Swae Lee, Offset | Spider-Man: Across the Spider-Verse (Soundtrack from and Inspired by the Motion Picture) |
| "Da One" | 2023 | Dame D.O.L.L.A. | Don D.O.L.L.A. |
| "My Daddy's Son" | 2023 | Dame D.O.L.L.A. | Don D.O.L.L.A. |
| "This Shit Right Here" | 2023 | | Hip Hop 50: Volume 2 |
| "FMFU" | 2023 | DJ Drama, Roddy, Gucci Mane | I'm Really Like That |
| "Uneasy" | 2023 | Jon Batiste | World Music Radio |
| "How We Roll" (Remix) | 2023 | Ciara, Chris Brown | Non-album single |
| "Never Die" | 2023 | Nas | Magic 3 |
| "Hallelujah Heaven" | 2023 | Shabba Ranks, Buju Banton | The Book of Clarence |
| "RNB" | 2023 | Nicki Minaj, Tate Kobang | Pink Friday 2 |
| "Splash Brothers" | 2024 | French Montana, Rick Ross | Mac & Cheese 5 |
| "Seven" | 2024 | Kid Cudi | Insano |
| "Lyfestyle" | 2024 | Yeat | 2093 |
| "Confirmation" (Remix) | 2024 | Yung Bleu | Jeremy |
| "Raw" | 2024 | Rapsody | Please Don't Cry |
| "Freak" | 2024 | Chris Brown, Tee Grizzley, Joyner Lucas | 11:11 (Deluxe) |
| "Bring Em Out" | 2024 | Glasses Malone, Cam'Ron | Fucc Glasses Malone |
| "Lifestyle" | 2024 | ¥$ (Kanye West and Ty Dolla Sign) | Vultures 2 |
| "Let's Get Lifted Again" (Man-Man Remix) | 2024 | John Legend, Killer Mike | Get Lifted {20th anniversary} |
| "Yoda" | 2025 | Tech N9ne | 5816 Forest |
| This Is Why" | 2025 | Tucker Nichols | TBD |
| "Pop That" | 2025 | ScarLip | Scarred Be4 Fame |
| "Anotha Luva" | 2026 | Kehlani | Kehlani |
| "Steppers" | 2026 | The Game | The Documentary III |

== Production discography ==
List of songwriting and executive production credits (excluding guest appearances, interpolations, and samples)
| Track(s) | Year | Credit | Artist(s) | Album |
|---|---|---|---|---|
| 2. "Solja Rag" | 1997 | Songwriter | Juvenile | Solja Rags |
| 14. "Solja Rag (Radio)" | 1997 | Songwriter | Juvenile | Solja Rags |
| 5. "Don't Play Wit It"; (featuring Big Gee) | 2006 | Songwriter | Yung Joc | New Joc City |
| 5. "Brand New"; (featuring T.I.) | 2008 | Songwriter | Lyfe Jennings | Lyfe Change |
| "PaYOW" (featuring Juelz Santana and Bobby V) | 2009 | Songwriter | Huey | Non-album single |
| 2. "Prom Queen" | 2010 | Producer (with Infamous and Andrew Correa) | Lil Wayne | Rebirth |
| 10. "Still Here" | 2016 | Songwriter | Drake | Views |

== See also ==
- Lil Wayne albums discography
- Lil Wayne videography
