= Love U Right =

Single by Cherlise

from the album Ground Zero
- Released: September 13, 2011
- Recorded: 2011
- Genre: R&B
- Length: 4:05
- Label: Division1, Universal Republic
- Songwriter(s): Rico Love
- Producer(s): Rico Love

"Love U Right" is a song performed by American recording artist Cherlise, taken from her 2012 mixtape Ground Zero. The song featured rapper Lil Wayne and was written by Rico Love and also produced by Rico Love. The single was released on 13 September 2011.

== Background and composition ==
Cherlise first announced on her official website that "Love U Right" would be released as the first single. The song began to pick up play's on US airwaves in August 2011. The song was produced and written by Cherlise's label owner and songwriter Rico Love.

== Critical reception ==
The song was reviewed by pop magazine Pop Crush, the official review was shown on Division1's official website. Pop Crush said that "Cherlise promises she can love you better than your current girl on her first single, ‘Love U Right,’ which features a cameo from Lil Wayne... ‘Love U Right’ shows a lot of promise, so we’ll be keeping an eye on her.

== Music video ==
On August 11, 2011, a preview of the video's choreography was released on Cherlise's YouTube account.

== Release history ==
Region	Date	Format
United States	September 13, 2011	Digital download
