= Cherlise =

American musician

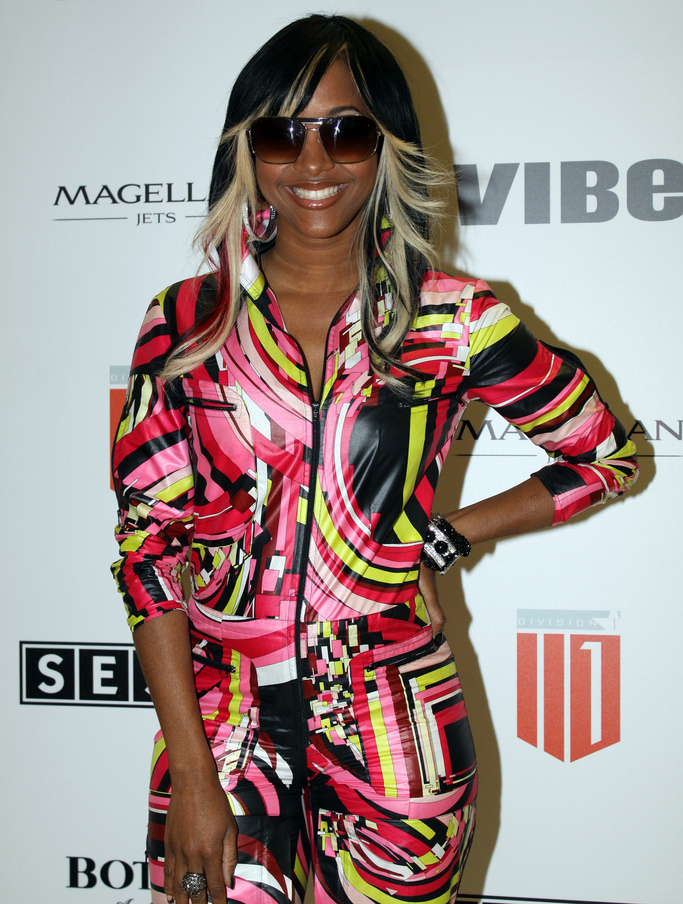
- Cherlise at the Division 1 Launch Party 2010.

Background information
- Origin: Miami, United States
- Genre: R&B
- Occupation: Singer-songwriter
- Instrument: vocals
- Years active: 2010–present
- Labels: Universal Motown, Division1
- Website: http://division1.com/cherlise

Cherlise is an American R&B singer signed to Rico Loves label Division1 and Universal Motown. She was born in Miami, Florida, United States. Cherlise released her first single "Love U Right" featuring Lil Wayne in 2011, from her 2012 mixtape Ground Zero.

== Biography ==
=== Early life and career beginnings ===
Cherlise was born one of ten children. Born and raised in the Carol City section of Miami, Cherlise developed her interest in music at an early age. She was discovered by her current manager, Percy Forrest, on the video set for rapper Fat Joe. Cherlise was introduced to songwriter/producer Rico Love. Love and Cherlise worked together for two years, and when Love closed his deal with Universal Motown for his Division1 imprint, he quickly signed Cherlise.

=== 2011–present: Like A Woman and Mixtape Ground Zero ===
Cherlise released her first official single "Love U Right" to radios in July 2011. The song featured rapper Lil Wayne. "Love U Right" was then released to iTunes 13 September 2011. The single was the first single from her 2012 mixtape "Ground Zero". She released a second official single: "Hollyhood" featuring Brianna.

On November 26 it was announced that Cherlise's first album would be called "Like A Woman" and also announced that the album would be due sometime in 2012. Cherlise was interviewed in late August 2011 on her new album and her sound "My music is very dance-driven and very sassy and definitely has a sexual tone to it, but it definitely is just fresh. If I just have to say it in words, it’s just a fresh sound and fresh feel." She also said "I don’t have an album name yet because I’m holding off on the final product. We’ve been working almost three years on the album. You should definitely expect a classic album. As far as features, we have Jim Jonsin and we have Earl and E. There’s a long list of people that we’ve been working with. As far as features are concerned, we have Lil’ Wayne right now. I don't want to go crazy with the features because it is my debut album so I'm really looking forward to the world getting a chance to know me as an artist and just fall in love with my music." In an interview Cherlise said "I’m working on my album right now. I’ve been in the lab with Lil Wayne, Fat Joe, Maino, Young Chris, and a few other artists. You should look forward to big things! My main focus however, is my album. It’s going to be a classic!"

== Discography ==
=== Mixtapes ===
- Ground Zero (2012)

=== Guest appearances ===
Title	Year	Other performer(s)	Album or mixtape
"Understanding"	2012	Brisco	Fruits Of My Labor
