= Annihilate (song) =

2023 song by Metro Boomin, Swae Lee, Lil Wayne and Offset

Song by Metro Boomin, Swae Lee, Lil Wayne and Offset

from the album Spider-Man: Across the Spider-Verse (Soundtrack from and Inspired by the Motion Picture)
- Released: June 2, 2023
- Recorded: 2022
- Genre: Trap
- Length: 3:51
- Label: Boominati; Republic
- Songwriters: Leland Wayne; Khalif Brown; Dwayne Carter, Jr.; Kiari Cephus; Jocelyn Donald; Michael Dean; Prince 85
- Producers: Metro Boomin; Mike Dean; Prince 85

Lyric video
- "Annihilate" on YouTube

"Annihilate" is a song by American record producer Metro Boomin and American rappers Swae Lee, Lil Wayne, and Offset. It was released through Boominati Worldwide and Republic Records as the opening track from Metro's first soundtrack album, which was for the film Spider-Man: Across the Spider-Verse, on June 2, 2023. Produced by Metro himself, Mike Dean, and Prince 85, the three wrote it alongside the three rappers and Jozzy. A lyric video was released four days later, however, the song was cut down to end after Swae's final chorus.

== Composition and lyrics ==
=== Production ===
On "Annihilate", Metro's drums and samples combine with fellow producer Mike Dean's synthesizers. Metro and Dean have had a prolific partnership for many years, dating back to when they both produced Father Stretch My Hands Pt.1 by Kanye West, which was the song that catapulted Metro into stardom. This is the first time Dean produced for a song with Metro being the lead artist. Dean's producer tag "MWA Music" can heard at near the end of the song. The song also features a sample from the movie at the end of the song with Gwen Stacy introducing Miles Morales to the Spider-Society saying:

Miles: This is unbelievable

Gwen: This is the lobby

Miles: Oh

Gwen: Welcome to Spider Society

The sample further makes the song stand out as an intro for the soundtrack.

=== Lyrics ===
Swae Lee sings the chorus and has his own verse at the end, while Lil Wayne and Offset also rap their own verses. All three rappers make references to the film Spider-Man: Across the Spider-Verse throughout the song. Right before Wayne starts his verse, a lighter flick can be heard. The lighter flick sound effect is a staple to Wayne's brand and can also be heard on numerous songs either made by him or featured him. Wayne starts making references to Spider-Man during his verse rapping: "Weezy Carter, I'm 'bout to go Peter Parker / I'm Spider-Man, if he ain't me, he just a creepy crawler". He makes these references in each line that he raps like: "Tunechi spark the lighter, pull up in a new Ferrari Spider. Spider web necklace with the diamonds, She'll turn into Spider-Woman if I bite her". At the ending of his verse rapping "Since I was an itsy bitsy spider, They've been tryna wash the spider out, I got spiders crawlin' out your mouth, Spider-Verse", he obviously makes a reference to the nursery rhyme Itsy Bitsy Spider, putting himself in the shoes of the spider saying people have been trying to wash him out. He also references the fact that every line in his verse has a spider themed reference and that he says spider 8 times, which is how many legs a spider has, thus making his verse a 'Spider-Verse"

== Charts ==
=== Weekly charts ===
Weekly chart performance for "Annihilate"
Chart (2023)	Peak position
Australia (ARIA)	33
Australia Hip Hop/R&B (ARIA)	12
Canada Hot 100 (Billboard)	23
France (SNEP)	166
Global 200 (Billboard)	30
India International Singles (IMI)	16
Ireland (IRMA)	54
New Zealand (Recorded Music NZ)	34
Portugal (AFP)	142
Singapore (RIAS)	16
Slovakia Singles Digital (ČNS IFPI)	60
UK Singles (Official Charts)	59
UK Hip Hop/R&B (Official Charts)	29
US Billboard Hot 100	44
US Hot R&B/Hip-Hop Songs (Billboard)	14

=== Year-end charts ===
Year-end chart performance for "Annihilate"
Chart (2023)	Position
US Hot R&B/Hip-Hop Songs (Billboard)	100

== Certifications ==
Certifications for "Annihilate"
Region	Certification	Certified units/sales
Australia (ARIA)	Gold	35,000^{‡}
Brazil (Pro-Música Brasil)	Gold	20,000^{‡}
^{‡} Sales+streaming figures based on certification alone.
