= Tha Carter albums =

Studio album series by Lil Wayne

Studio album series by Lil Wayne
- Released: June 29, 2004 (Tha Carter); December 6, 2005 (Tha Carter II); June 10, 2008 (Tha Carter III); August 29, 2011 (Tha Carter IV); September 27, 2018 (Tha Carter V); June 6, 2025 (Tha Carter VI)
- Genre: Southern hip-hop; gangsta rap; hardcore hip-hop; R&B; hip hop; pop rap
- Label: Cash Money; Young Money; Universal; Republic
- Producer: Various; notably Mannie Fresh

The Tha Carter albums is a series of studio albums by American rapper Lil Wayne. First released in 2004 with Tha Carter, there are a total of 6 albums in the series with the most recent being Tha Carter VI (2025). The albums have been released under labels such as Cash Money Records, Young Money Entertainment, Universal Records, and Republic Records. Production duties on the albums were held by numerous producers (most notably Mannie Fresh), and has had more than 50 featured guests across the 6 albums.

== Albums in order ==
- Tha Carter (2004)
- Tha Carter II (2005)
- Tha Carter III (2008)
- Tha Carter IV (2011)
- Tha Carter V (2018)
- Tha Carter VI (2025)

== Singles ==
Singles from Tha Carter include "Bring It Back" (featuring Mannie Fresh), released on April 17, 2004, "Go D.J." (featuring Mannie Fresh), released on October 5, 2004, and "Earthquake", released on March 27, 2005.

Singles from Tha Carter II include "Fireman", released on October 25, 2005, "Hustler Musik", released on January 10, 2006, and "Shooter", released on April 9, 2006.

Singles from Tha Carter III include "Lollipop" (featuring Static Major), released on March 13, 2008, "A Milli", released on April 23, 2008, "Got Money" (featuring T-Pain), released on May 27, 2008, "Mrs. Officer" (featuring Bobby Valentino and Kidd Kidd), released on September 11, 2008, and "Comfortable" (featuring Babyface), released on September 29, 2008.

Singles from Tha Carter IV include "6 Foot 7 Foot" (featuring Cory Gunz), released on December 10, 2010, "John" (featuring Rick Ross), released on March 24, 2011, "How to Love", released on May 31, 2011, "She Will" (featuring Drake), released on August 16, 2011, "It's Good" (featuring Jadakiss and Drake), released on September 13, 2011, and "Mirror" (featuring Bruno Mars), released on September 13, 2011.

Singles from Tha Carter V include "Uproar" (featuring Swizz Beatz), released on October 5, 2018, and "Don't Cry" (featuring XXXTentacion), released on January 3, 2019.

There was only one single from Tha Carter VI, being The Days (featuring Bono).

== Awards ==
These awards are for individual albums only.

=== BET Hip Hop Awards ===
Year	Nominee / work	Award	Result	Ref.
2008	Tha Carter III	CD of the Year	Won	

=== Billboard Music Awards ===
Year	Nominee / work	Award	Result
2012	Tha Carter IV	Best Rap Album	Nominated

=== Grammy Awards ===
Year	Nominee / work	Award	Result
2009	Tha Carter III	Best Rap Album	Won
2012	Tha Carter IV	Best Rap Album	Nominated
