= The Dedication Tour =

2016 concert tour by Lil Wayne

- Tour by Lil Wayne
- Associated album: No Ceilings 2
- Start date: January 21, 2016
- End date: March 6, 2016
- Legs: 1
- No. of shows: 19
- Box office: $8.6 million

Lil Wayne concert chronology
- Sorry For The Wait 2 Tour (2015); The Dedication Tour (2016); Kloser 2 U Tour (2017)

The Dedication Tour was a North American concert tour headlined by American rapper Lil Wayne. The tour began on January 21, 2016 in El Paso, Texas before concluding on March 6, 2016 in Lincoln, Nebraska for a grand total of 19 shows.

== Opening acts ==
- Rae Sremmurd
- DJ Drama

== Setlist ==
1. A Milli
2. Believe Me
3. Blunt Blowin'
4. Comfortable
5. Cross Me
6. Drop the World
7. Every Girl
8. Finessin
9. Go DJ
10. Got Money
11. How to Love
12. Hustler Musik
13. HYFR (Hell Ya Fucking Right)
14. I'm Goin' In
15. I'm Me
16. I'm on One
17. I'm Single
18. John
19. Jumpman
20. Karate Chop (Remix)
21. Leather So Soft
22. Live from the Gutter
23. Lollipop
24. London Roads
25. Love Me
26. Loyal
27. Mirror
28. Mr. Carter
29. Mrs. Officer
30. Nightmares of the Bottom
31. No Worries
32. Only
33. Pop Bottles
34. Pop That
35. Pussy, Money, Weed
36. Rich as Fuck
37. Ride 4 My Niggas
38. Right Above It
39. Rollin'
40. She Will
41. Steady Mobbin'
42. The Motto
43. Truffle Butter
44. Wasted
45. Where Ya At
