= Hip-hop (disambiguation) =

Hip-hop, or rap music, is a genre of popular music that originated in the Bronx area of New York City in the 1970s.

Hip-hop may also refer to:

- Hip-hop culture, an African American subculture including music, dance and graffiti
- Hip-hop dance, a range of street dance styles
- Hip-hop fashion, a distinctive style of dress

== Songs ==
- "Hip-Hop" (Dead Prez song), 2000
- "Hip-Hop" (Lil Wayne and BigXthaPlug song), 2025
- "Hip Hop" (Royce da 5'9" song), 2003
- "Hip-Hop", a song by August Alsina from This Thing Called Life, 2015
- "Hip Hop", a song by Bizarre featuring Eminem from Hannicap Circus, 2005
- "Hip Hop", a song by DJ Khaled featuring Nas and Scarface from Kiss the Ring, 2012
- "Hip Hop", a song by Joell Ortiz from The Brick: Bodega Chronicles, 2007
- "Hip Hop", a song by Large Professor from 1st Class, 2002
- "Hip Hop", a song by LL Cool J from Mr. Smith, 1995
- "Hip Hop", a song by Mos Def from Black on Both Sides, 1999

== Other uses ==
- HipHop for PHP, computer software
- Hip Hop (mascot), former mascot of the Philadelphia 76ers
- Conrad Tillard, sometimes known as "Hip-Hop Minister"
