= Tha Carter IV =

Studio album by Lil Wayne
- Released: August 29, 2011
- Recorded: October 2008 – July 2011
- Studios: Wayne's Crib (Miami, Florida)
- Genre: Hip-hop
- Length: 60:25
- Labels: Cash Money; Universal Republic; Young Money
- Producers: Bryan "Baby Birdman" Williams (exec.); Cortez Bryant (exec.); The President (exec.); Mack Maine (exec.); Ronald "Slim tha Don" Williams (exec.); Angel Onhel Aponte; Christopher Allen; The Commission; Cool & Dre; Detail; Diplo; DJA; Drew Money; DVLP; Filthy; Emile Haynie; MegaMan; Mr. Bangladesh; Polow Da Don; REO; Rob Holladay; The Smeezingtons; Snizzy; T-Minus; Tha Drummahz; Timbaland; Willy Will; Wizz Dumb; Young Fyre

Lil Wayne chronology
Sorry 4 the Wait (2011)	Tha Carter IV (2011)	Dedication 4 (2012)

Tha Carter albums chronology
Tha Carter III (2008)	Tha Carter IV (2011)	Tha Carter V (2018)

Alternative cover
- Deluxe edition cover

Singles from Tha Carter IV
- 1. "6 Foot 7 Foot" Released: December 16, 2010; 2. "John" Released: March 24, 2011; 3. "How to Love" Released: May 31, 2011; 4. "She Will" Released: August 16, 2011; 5. "It's Good" Released: September 13, 2011; 6. "Mirror" Released: September 13, 2011

Tha Carter IV is the ninth studio album by American rapper Lil Wayne, released on August 29, 2011, through Cash Money Records, Universal Republic Records and Young Money Entertainment. Recording sessions for the album began in late 2008, shortly after Lil Wayne's sixth studio album, Tha Carter III (2008) was released to strong sales and critical acclaim: however, the sessions were put on hold, as Lil Wayne claimed he did not want to follow an album he held in high regard so quickly with another, potentially inferior release. In the interim, Lil Wayne released his two other albums in 2010: the largely rock-themed Rebirth, and I Am Not a Human Being. The latter was reportedly composed from unreleased material from the original Tha Carter IV sessions, as the album was released whilst Wayne served a prison sentence at Rikers Island prison for illegal possession of a weapon, and was thus unable to record any new material: this also meant Tha Carter IV's recording sessions were once more put on hold.

Following Wayne's release from prison, the album was re-recorded from scratch. The recording sessions resumed at various locations, involving several record producers including Bangladesh, Detail, T-Minus, Noah "40" Shebib, Polow da Don, Jim Jonsin, Tha Bizness, Kane Beatz, Boi-1da, Willy Will, Streetrunner, Cool & Dre, Young Ladd, The Smeezingtons, and Kanye West. The album largely contains more introspective subject matter compared to its predecessors, often exploring morbid lyrical content and downtempo production. Appearances on the album include Cory Gunz, Drake, T-Pain, Tech N9ne, André 3000, Rick Ross, John Legend, Bruno Mars, Birdman, Kevin Rudolf, Jadakiss, Bun B, Nas, Shyne, and Busta Rhymes.

Following a heavily delayed release, Tha Carter IV was released to digital retailers at midnight on August 28, 2011, following Wayne's scheduled performance at the MTV Video Music Awards, and physical retailers received the album the following day. Tha Carter IV debuted at number one on the US Billboard 200 chart, with first-week-sales of 964,000 copies in the United States and became Lil Wayne's third album to debut at number one. The album received generally mixed reviews from music critics, who were divided in their responses towards the album's production and Wayne's own performances on the album, finding it to be a disappointment compared to his previous work.

It received a nomination for Best Rap Album at the 54th Annual Grammy Awards.

== Background and development ==
In June 2008, after a similarly delayed release, Lil Wayne released his previous album in the Tha Carter series, Tha Carter III (2008). The album sold 1,005,545 copies in its first week of sales in the United States, and produced three top ten singles in the US, including the number one-hit "Lollipop". The album became the highest selling of the year in the United States. In a September 2008 interview with Shaheem Reid of MTV Mixtape Monday, Lil Wayne revealed that he had begun work on his next official mixtape, Dedication 3 (2008) and also confirmed a sequel to Tha Carter III, titled Tha Carter IV. Initial recording sessions for the album began in early October 2008, but these were put on hold, as later that month Wayne claimed that he did not want the album to follow Tha Carter III immediately.

No more information emerged on the album until October 2009, when Cash Money Records CEO Birdman reported that Wayne would release three studio albums on December 15, 2009: Tha Carter IV, Rebirth, an album being promoted as Wayne's debut rock music album, and We Are Young Money, a collaborative recording with members of Wayne's record label, Young Money Entertainment. However, it was later confirmed that Rebirth and We Are Young Money would be released separately and that Tha Carter IV would be released in 2011. Tha Carter IV was going to be released in late May, but was pushed back to June. Mack Maine confirmed that the album's release was postponed because they still needed time to make it perfect. On June 2, 2011, the album was pushed back further, and the album was due for release on August 29, 2011.

The album's cover was released to the internet on April 19, 2011. A deluxe edition has been confirmed for Tha Carter IV, with the album's cover being released to the internet as well.

Also the track "Dear Anne (Stan Part 2)" (originally "Anne") was supposed to be on Tha Carter IV but was removed from the album. Lil Wayne said in an interview with XXL that he was not a fan of "Dear Anne" and that it had been planned to appear on Tha Carter III. On July 8, 2011, producer Swizz Beatz hinted at Wayne possibly re-recording a new version of Anne, after he had said the verses were too "old". Prior to Tha Carter IV's release, Swizz Beatz released the song on his Monster Mondays free music program through his official website.

On June 13, 2011, a track called "Nightmares of the Bottom" from Tha Carter IV was confirmed on MTV's Unplugged by Lil Wayne performing live. On July 11, 2011, Lil Wayne confirmed in an interview with MTV that Tha Carter IV is finished and will be releasing on August 29, 2011. On August 7–8, 2011 videos of Lil Wayne recording a song called "She Will" and featuring Drake was posted online and would be on the album. The song was released on the Internet on August 12, 2011. HipHollywood released a YouTube video about T-Pain giving a song to Lil Wayne for his album called, "How to Hate," confirming that it will be on the album.

== Singles ==
The album's lead single, "6 Foot 7 Foot", which features Cory Gunz, was released on December 16, 2010. It peaked at nine on the US Billboard Hot 100 and at two on both the US Hot R&B/Hip-Hop Songs chart and US Rap Songs chart, in addition to reaching the top fifty in Canada. The video made premieres on MTV on March 3, 2011, and on BET's 106 & Park on March 4, 2011. The video (directed by Hype Williams) was inspired by the film Inception, and consists of numerous scenes which visualize many of the metaphors and similes Wayne says in the song.

"John", which features Rick Ross was released as the second single on March 24, 2011 and debuted at twenty-two on the US Hot 100. It also reached nineteen on US R&B charts and twelve on US Rap charts. The official music video was released on VEVO on May 12, 2011. The video also featured cameos by Birdman and Gunplay, and was directed by Colin Tilley, director of "Look at Me Now" by Chris Brown, and No Sleep by Wiz Khalifa.

"How to Love" was released as the third single on May 31, 2011. It had peaked at number five on the US Hot 100, becoming Wayne's fourteenth top ten hit and the best performing single from the album. It also peaked at number two on US R&B charts and number two on US Rap charts, in addition to reaching the top forty in Canada and top fifty in the UK. Detail, the song's producer, claimed Lil Wayne used no Auto-Tune in the song; The music video (directed by Chris Robinson) premiered August 23, 2011 on MTV Jams as "Jam of the Week".

The fourth single, "She Will", which features Drake, was released on the internet on August 12, 2011. The song was to be titled "Maybe She Will", and feature a verse from Rick Ross, however it did not make the final cut. The single released on download format in the United States on August 16, 2011.

The fifth single, "It's Good", which features Jadakiss and Drake, was solicited to urban radio as the album's fifth single on September 13, 2011.

The sixth single from the album is "Mirror" featuring Bruno Mars, which is a bonus track on the deluxe edition. It was released to urban radio on September 13, 2011. It was sent to Rhythmic radio and re-released to urban radio on November 1, 2011. Upon the release of Tha Carter IV it debuted at number sixteen on the US Hot 100 based on downloads alone.

== Critical reception ==
Professional ratings
Aggregate scores
Source	Rating
AnyDecentMusic?	5.2/10
Metacritic	60/100
Review scores
Source	Rating
AllMusic	3/5 stars
The A.V. Club	C+
Chicago Tribune	2/4 stars
Entertainment Weekly	B
Los Angeles Times	2.5/4 stars
NME	4/10
Pitchfork	6.2/10
Rolling Stone	3.5/5 stars
Slant Magazine	3/5 stars
Spin	6/10

Tha Carter IV received generally mixed reviews from critics, with many viewing it as a disappointment. At Metacritic, which assigns a weighted mean rating out of 100 to reviews from mainstream publications, the album received an average score of 60, based on 29 reviews. Robert Christgau wrote in The Barnes & Noble Review that the record "has its moments ... but its stunted sense of play is summed up by the T-Pain-aided 'How to Hate.'" Chicago Tribune writer Greg Kot viewed that Wayne "sounds slower, more methodical, less unhinged" and felt that he is held back by "repetitive subject matter — even Wayne sounds bored by trying to flip yet one more clever couplet about blunts and 'hos." Sean Fennessey of Spin wrote that "it's not a terribly ambitious mess, nor is it much fun, which for Wayne is a sin," and criticized his lyrics, stating "He rarely divulges specific moments ... usually keeping the gritty details unexplained." Slant Magazine's Matthew Cole commented that the album's production "chases trends far more often than it attempts to set them" and found Wayne "not in exhilarating top form". Los Angeles Times writer Jeff Weiss viewed his lyrics as "predictable" and called the album "more pedestrian than embarrassing." Andy Hutchins of The Village Voice called it "a bad rap album" and criticized its music as "a composition of a lot of rapping styles Wayne's dabbled in and production styles that have been bubbling in rap for some time, except little of it clicks."

In a positive review, Rolling Stone writer Rob Sheffield stated, "it's thrilling how unhinged Weezy sounds", adding that "even the failed moments sound like nobody else". AllMusic editor David Jeffries stated, "If II and III were the arguable masterpieces, this one is less convincing, but it is a solid, above average hip-hop album". Jon Caramanica of The New York Times felt that the guest rappers bring "their A game" and stated, "even on this album's weak tracks, and there are several, [Wayne] remains a commanding presence, deploying just enough of his insistent croak to tether the song together."

== Commercial performance ==
Tha Carter IV had 300,000 downloads in its first four days online, which broke an iTunes record set by Watch the Throne. In the United States, Tha Carter IV debuted at number one on the US Billboard 200 chart, selling 964,000 copies in its first week. It achieved the highest first-week album sales since Lady Gaga's Born This Way. In its second week, the album stayed at number one on the chart, despite a 77% decrease in sales, selling 219,000 copies. By February 2012, the album had sold 3.5 million copies worldwide. By July 2013, it had sold 2,296,000 copies in the US. On September 25, 2020, the album was certified five times platinum by the Recording Industry Association of America (RIAA) for combined sales and album-equivalent units of over of five million units in the United States.

In Canada, the album debuted at number one on the Canadian Albums Chart, selling 31,000 copies in its first week.

Also in Europe, the album made better scores compared to Wayne's previous work, reaching the top ten in a few national musical markets, including Norway and Switzerland, and top twenty in Ireland, Germany, France, Denmark, the Netherlands and top thirty in Belgium. (Note: See the charts section for the exact peaks.)

== Track listing ==
Album credits adapted from official liner notes.

No.	Title	Writer(s)	Producer(s)	Length
1.	"Intro"	Dwayne Carter, Jr.; Willie Hodge II; Jermaine Preyan	Willy Will	2:52
2.	"Blunt Blowin"	Carter, Jr.; Bigram Zayas; Matthew DelGiorno	DVLP; Filthy^{[a]}	5:12
3.	"MegaMan"	Carter, Jr.; Orville McWhinney	MegaMan	3:18
4.	"6 Foot 7 Foot" (featuring Cory Gunz)	Carter, Jr.; Seandrae Crawford; Peter Panky, Jr.; William Attaway; Irving Burgie	Mr. Bangladesh	4:08
5.	"Nightmares of the Bottom"	Carter, Jr.; Preyan; Ben Vaughn; Maurice Jordan	Snizzy; Kenoe	4:41
6.	"She Will" (featuring Drake)	Carter, Jr.; Aubrey Graham; Tyler Williams	T-Minus • 40	5:05
7.	"How to Hate" (featuring T-Pain)	Carter, Jr.; Faheem Najm; Tremaine Winfrey	Young Fyre; Andrew Lloyd^{[b]}	4:38
8.	"Interlude" (featuring Tech N9ne)	Carter, Jr.; Hodge II; Preyan; Aaron Yates; Andre Benjamin	Willy Will	2:01
9.	"John" (featuring Rick Ross)	Carter, Jr.; Jamal Jones; Rob Holladay; Kevin Crowe; Erik Ortiz; William Roberts II	Polow da Don; Rob Holladay	4:47
10.	"Abortion"	Carter, Jr.; Preyan; Stephen Hacker	The Commission; Streetrunner^{[b]}	3:43
11.	"So Special" (featuring John Legend)	Carter, Jr.; Andre Lyon; Marcello Valenzano; Eddie Montilla; John Stephens	Cool & Dre	3:52
12.	"How to Love"	Carter, Jr.; Preyan; Noel Fisher; LaMar Seymour; LaNelle Seymour; Marcus Boyd	Detail; Tha Drummahz^{[a]}	4:00
13.	"President Carter"	Carter, Jr.; Angel Aponte; Marco Rodriguez-Diaz	Onhel; Christopher Allen; Infamous	4:15
14.	"It's Good" (featuring Jadakiss and Drake)	Carter, Jr.; Lyon; Valenzano; Graham; Jason Phillips; Brian Pickens; Alan Parsons; Eric Woolfson	Cool & Dre	4:01
15.	"Outro" (performed by Bun B, Nas, Shyne, and Busta Rhymes)	Carter, Jr.; Hodge II; Preyan; Bernard Freeman; Nasir Jones; Jamal Barrow; Trevor Smith, Jr.; Moshe Levi Ben-David	Willy Will	3:52
Total length:				60:25

Deluxe edition bonus tracks
No.	Title	Writer(s)	Producer(s)	Length
16.	"I Like the View"	Carter, Jr.; Lyon; Valenzano	Cool & Dre	4:41
17.	"Mirror" (featuring Bruno Mars)	Carter, Jr.; Peter Hernandez; Phillip Lawrence; Ramon Owen	REO; The Smeezingtons^{[a]}	3:48
18.	"Two Shots"	Carter, Jr.; Thomas Pentz; Derek Allen	Diplo; DJA^{[b]}	2:45
Total length:				71:39

iTunes Store bonus track
No.	Title	Writer(s)	Producer(s)	Length
19.	"Up Up and Away"	Carter, Jr.; Brandon Deener; Timothy Mosley	Wizz Dumb; Timbaland	3:53
Total length:				75:32

Target and Japan bonus tracks
No.	Title	Writer(s)	Producer(s)	Length
19.	"Novacane" (featuring Kevin Rudolf)	Carter, Jr.; Emile Haynie; Freddy Wexler; Donnell Butler; Kevin Rudolf; Benard Ighner	Emile Haynie	3:38
20.	"I Got Some Money on Me" (featuring Birdman)	Carter, Jr.; Preyan; Bryan Williams; Andrew Thielk	Drew Money	4:05
Total length:				79:22

Notes

- ^{^[a]} signifies a co-producer.
- ^{^[b]} signifies an additional producer.
- "Interlude" features additional vocals by André 3000

Sample credits

- "6 Foot 7 Foot" contains samples of "Day-O (The Banana Boat Song)" as written and performed by Harry Belafonte.
- "John" contains an interpolation "I'm Not a Star" as written by William Roberts II, Kevin Crowe and Erik Ortiz.
- "President Carter" contains a sample of "Les Dunes D'ostende" as written and performed by François de Roubaix, which is the theme song to the 1971's horror film Daughters of Darkness; and excerpts from a speech by Jimmy Carter.
- "It's Good" contains a sample of "The Cask of Amontillado" as written and performed by The Alan Parsons Project.
- "Novacane" contains elements of "Everything Must Change" as written and performed by Benard Ighner.

== Personnel ==
Credits for Tha Carter IV adapted from AllMusic.

- Richard Adlam – choir, chorus, keyboards
- Christopher Allen – producer
- Angel Onhel Aponte – composer, producer
- Danny Arrondo – recording assistant
- Roland "DJ Folk" Bailey – production coordination
- Alton Bates – engineer
- Joshua Berkman – A&R
- Robert "Big Briz" Brisbane – engineer
- Sandy Brummels – creative director
- Cortez Bryant – executive producer
- Katina Bynum – project manager
- Michael "Banger" Cadahia – engineer
- Noel Cadastre – recording assistant
- Mrs. Carter – cover image
- The commission – producer
- Cool & Dre – producer
- Martika Cortes – recording assistant
- Seandrae "Mr. Bangladesh" Crawford – producer
- Detail – producer
- Alex Dilliplane – mixing assistant
- Diplo – producer
- DJA – producer
- Luis Duque – recording assistant
- DVLP – producer
- Dwayne Carter – composer, executive producer
- Eric Eylands – mixing assistant
- Filthy – producer
- Young Fyre – producer
- Elizabeth Gallardo – mixing assistant, recording assistant
- Brian "Big Bass" Gardner – mastering
- Guthrie Govan – bass, guitar
- Rob Holladay – producer
- Ghazi Hourani – mixing assistant
- Infamous – producer
- Chad Jolley – mixing assistant
- Ke'Noe – producer
- Kyledidthis – art direction, design
- Steve Lee – choir, chorus
- Edward "Jewfro" Lidow – assistant engineer, engineer, recording assistant
- Andrew Lloyd – additional production
- Mack Maine – executive producer
- Fabian Marascuillo – mixing
- MegaMan – producer
- Eddie "Krack Keys" Montilla – composer, piano, strings
- Nabil – photography
- Neal H. Pogue – mixing
- Polow da Don – producer
- REO – producer
- Harry Ritson – choir, chorus, keyboards
- Rudy Rodriguez – recording assistant
- Noah Shebib – engineer
- The Smeezingtons – producer
- Snizzy – producer
- Jeremy Stevenson – mixing
- Streetrunner – additional production
- T-Minus – producer
- Drum Up – producer
- Javier Valverde – engineer
- Seth Waldman – mixing assistant
- Willy Will – producer
- Bryan "Baby Birdman" Williams – executive producer
- Ronald "Slim Tha Don" Williams – executive producer
- Kevin Zulueta – engineer

== Charts ==
=== Weekly charts ===
Chart (2011)	Peak position
Australian Albums (ARIA)	9
Austrian Albums (Ö3 Austria)	34
Belgian Albums (Ultratop Flanders)	22
Belgian Albums (Ultratop Wallonia)	22
Canadian Albums (Billboard)	1
Danish Albums (Hitlisten)	16
Dutch Albums (Album Top 100)	16
French Albums (SNEP)	14
German Albums (Offizielle Top 100)	13
Irish Albums (IRMA)	19
Italian Albums (FIMI)	51
Mexican Albums (Top 100 Mexico)	86
New Zealand Albums (RMNZ)	8
Norwegian Albums (VG-lista)	6
Scottish Albums (Official Charts)	14
Swedish Albums (Sverigetopplistan)	41
Swiss Albums (Schweizer Hitparade)	9
UK Albums (Official Charts)	8
UK R&B Albums (Official Charts)	1
US Billboard 200	1
US Top R&B/Hip-Hop Albums (Billboard)	1
US Top Rap Albums (Billboard)	1

=== Year-end charts ===
Chart (2011)	Position
Canadian Albums (Billboard)	30
US Billboard 200	6
US Top R&B/Hip-Hop Albums (Billboard)	1
US Top Rap Albums (Billboard)	1

Chart (2012)	Position
US Billboard 200	39
US Top R&B/Hip-Hop Albums (Billboard)	6
US Top Rap Albums (Billboard)	5

Chart (2013)	Position
US Top R&B/Hip-Hop Albums (Billboard)	87

=== Decade-end charts ===
Chart (2010–2019)	Position
US Billboard 200	130

== Certifications ==
Region	Certification	Certified units/sales
Denmark (IFPI Danmark)	Gold	10,000^{‡}
United Kingdom (BPI)	Gold	100,000^{‡}
United States (RIAA)	5× Platinum	5,000,000^{‡}
^{‡} Sales+streaming figures based on certification alone.

== Release history ==
Region	Date	Edition (Format)	Catalog	Label
Australia	July 9, 2011	Standard (CD / download)	2734831	Universal Music, Cash Money
Australia	July 9, 2011	Deluxe (CD / download)	2734832	Universal Music, Cash Money
Austria	July 9, 2011	Standard (CD)	—	Universal Music, Cash Money
Belgium	July 18, 2011	Standard (Download)	—	Universal Music, Cash Money
Canada	August 29, 2011	Standard (CD / download)	—	Universal Music, Cash Money
Canada	August 29, 2011	Deluxe (Download)	—	Universal Music, Cash Money
United States	August 29, 2011	Standard (CD / download)	602583409203	Young Money, Cash Money, Universal Republic
United States	August 29, 2011	Deluxe (CD / download)	602583409211	Young Money, Cash Money, Universal Republic
United Kingdom	August 29, 2011	Standard (CD / download)	—	Universal Island, Cash Money
United Kingdom	August 29, 2011	Deluxe (CD / download)	—	Universal Island, Cash Money
Ireland	August 7, 2011	Standard (Download)	—	Universal Music, Cash Money
Ireland	August 7, 2011	Deluxe (Download)	—	Universal Music, Cash Money
Ireland	August 28, 2011	Standard (CD)	—	Universal Music, Cash Money
Ireland	August 28, 2011	Deluxe (CD)	—	Universal Music, Cash Money
Japan	September 5, 2011	Deluxe (Download)	UICD9848	Universal Music, Cash Money
Germany	September 7, 2011	Standard (CD)	—	Universal Music, Cash Money
Germany	September 7, 2011	Deluxe (CD)	—	Universal Music, Cash Money
France	July 26, 2011	Standard (CD / download)	—	Universal Music, Cash Money
France	July 26, 2011	Deluxe (Download)	—	Universal Music, Cash Money
New Zealand	July 26, 2011	Standard (CD)	—	Universal Music, Cash Money
Italy	August 30, 2011	Deluxe (CD / download)	—	Universal Music, Cash Money
Philippines	July 6, 2011	Standard (CD / download)	—	MCA Music, Cash Money
Philippines	July 6, 2011	Deluxe (CD / download)	—	MCA Music, Cash Money
