= MegaMan (song) =

Song by Lil Wayne

from the album Tha Carter IV
- Recorded: 2011
- Genre: Hip hop
- Length: 3:18
- Label: Young Money; Cash Money; Universal Republic
- Songwriters: Dwayne Carter; Orville Mcwhinney
- Producer: MegaMan

"MegaMan" is a song by American rapper Lil Wayne, from his ninth studio album, Tha Carter IV. Although not released as a single, the song peaked at number 52 on the Billboard Hot 100. "MegaMan" was the last song recorded for the album and was named after its producer MegaMan.

== Background and recording ==
Producer MegaMan initially got in touch with Lil Wayne through a mutual relative–Young Jeezy's DJ Folk. MegaMan submitted a beat to Wayne, which he had originally created for Jay-Z and Kanye West. Wayne liked the beat and wanted to record a collaboration with singer Amy Winehouse over it. Eventually the record didn't make the final cut for Tha Carter IV.

After ending the recording sessions for the album, Lil Wayne reopened them, looking for a "hard track". MegaMan created a new beat specifically for Wayne. The track, originally called "Hold Back", was later given the working title "MegaMan" during the recording sessions. The name was eventually kept for the final track list.

"I created something new, off the top. I just thought of Wayne and went from there. The beat came out the way it came out. I made sure it had that Wayne feeling, that Wayne vibe."

— MegaMan in an interview with XXL

== Chart performance ==
Chart (2011–12)	Peak position
U.S. Billboard Hot 100	52
U.S. Hot R&B/Hip-Hop Songs	97
