= Welcome to Tha Carter =

2025 song by Lil Wayne

Song by Lil Wayne

from the album Tha Carter VI
- Released: June 6, 2025
- Genre: Hip-hop; gospel rap
- Length: 3:35
- Label: Young Money; Republic
- Songwriters: Angel Alponte; Dwayne Carter Jr.
- Producer: Onhel

"Welcome to Tha Carter" is a song by American rapper Lil Wayne from his fourteenth studio album, Tha Carter VI. It was released as the album's second track on June 6, 2025, and was co-written and produced by Angel "Onhel" Alponte. The song peaked at number 62 on the Billboard Hot 100.

Wayne performed the song live at the 2025 BET Awards alongside "A Milli".

== Critical reception ==
Paul Attard of Slant Magazine opined that while the track was not "groundbreaking," it featured Wayne's wordplay that was "delivered with snappy verve," showing the album's promise. Similarly, Rolling Stone editor Mosi Reeves noted the punchlines.

Fred Thomas of AllMusic was less favorable, likening the choir to a "ridiculous Aretha Franklin-modeled AI vocals" and feeling it should have never been left on the album.

In a ranking of the album's nineteen songs, Billboard's Michael Saponara placed it at number five. He penned, "Weezy effortlessly bounces off the drums while interpolating Diddy bars from the 1997 classic 'Victory.'"

== Charts ==
Chart performance for "Welcome to Tha Carter"
| Chart (2025) | Peak position |
|---|---|
| New Zealand (Recorded Music NZ) | 22 |
| US Billboard Hot 100 | 62 |
| US Hot R&B/Hip-Hop Songs (Billboard) | 16 |
