= H.A.M. =

Single by Jay-Z and Kanye West

from the album Watch the Throne (Deluxe)
- Released: January 11, 2011
- Recorded: 2010–2011
- Studio: Real World (Wiltshire, UK); (The Mercer) Hotel (New York)
- Genre: Hip-hop; electro; orchestral
- Length: 4:38
- Label: Roc-A-Fella; Def Jam
- Songwriters: Shawn Carter; Kanye West; Lexus Lewis; Mike Dean
- Producer: Lex Luger

Jay-Z singles chronology
"Monster" (2010)	"H.A.M." (2011)	"Otis" (2011)

Kanye West singles chronology
"Christmas in Harlem" (2010)	"H.A.M." (2011)	"E.T." (2011)

"H.A.M." (an acronym for "Hard As a Motherfucker" and stylized as "H•A•M") is a song by American rappers Jay-Z and Kanye West from the deluxe edition of their collaborative studio album, Watch the Throne (2011). The song features additional vocals from Aude Cardona and Jacob Lewis Smith. It was produced by Lex Luger and co-produced by West, with additional production from Mike Dean, and the three of them served as co-writers with Jay-Z. The song's beat was first provided to West by Lex Luger during the recording sessions for the rapper's fifth studio album, My Beautiful Dark Twisted Fantasy (2010). West then added his production work up until the release and would not preview it to Lex Luger, who considered this was due to his perfectionist approach. The song was released for digital download in the United States as the lead single for the album on January 11, 2011, through Roc-A-Fella Records and Def Jam Recordings.

A hip-hop, electro, and orchestral number with techno elements, the song includes drums and an electro-opera coda. Jay-Z also addresses Birdman's previous comments that he is not a better rapper nor richer than Lil Wayne, who responded to him in "It's Good". "H.A.M." received mixed reviews from music critics, who were divided towards Jay-Z and West's performance styles. Some highlighted their innovation and others considered the music to be unsuitable for the two, while a few critics praised its elaborate production.

In the US, the song charted at number 23 on the Billboard Hot 100 and number 24 on the Hot R&B/Hip-Hop Songs chart. It also attained top-50 positions in Canada, Denmark, Ireland, Scotland, and the United Kingdom. The song was certified gold in the US by the Recording Industry Association of America. Jay-Z and West performed the song for Vevo's South by Southwest show in March 2011, two months before performing it at the Museum of Modern Art's annual party. West used it as his introductory song at festivals during 2011, including Coachella, Splendour in the Grass, and The Big Chill. In early 2011, Busta Rhymes shared a remix of "H.A.M." and Lupe Fiasco delivered a freestyle over the song. The song was used in the teen comedy film Project X (2012).

== Background and recording ==
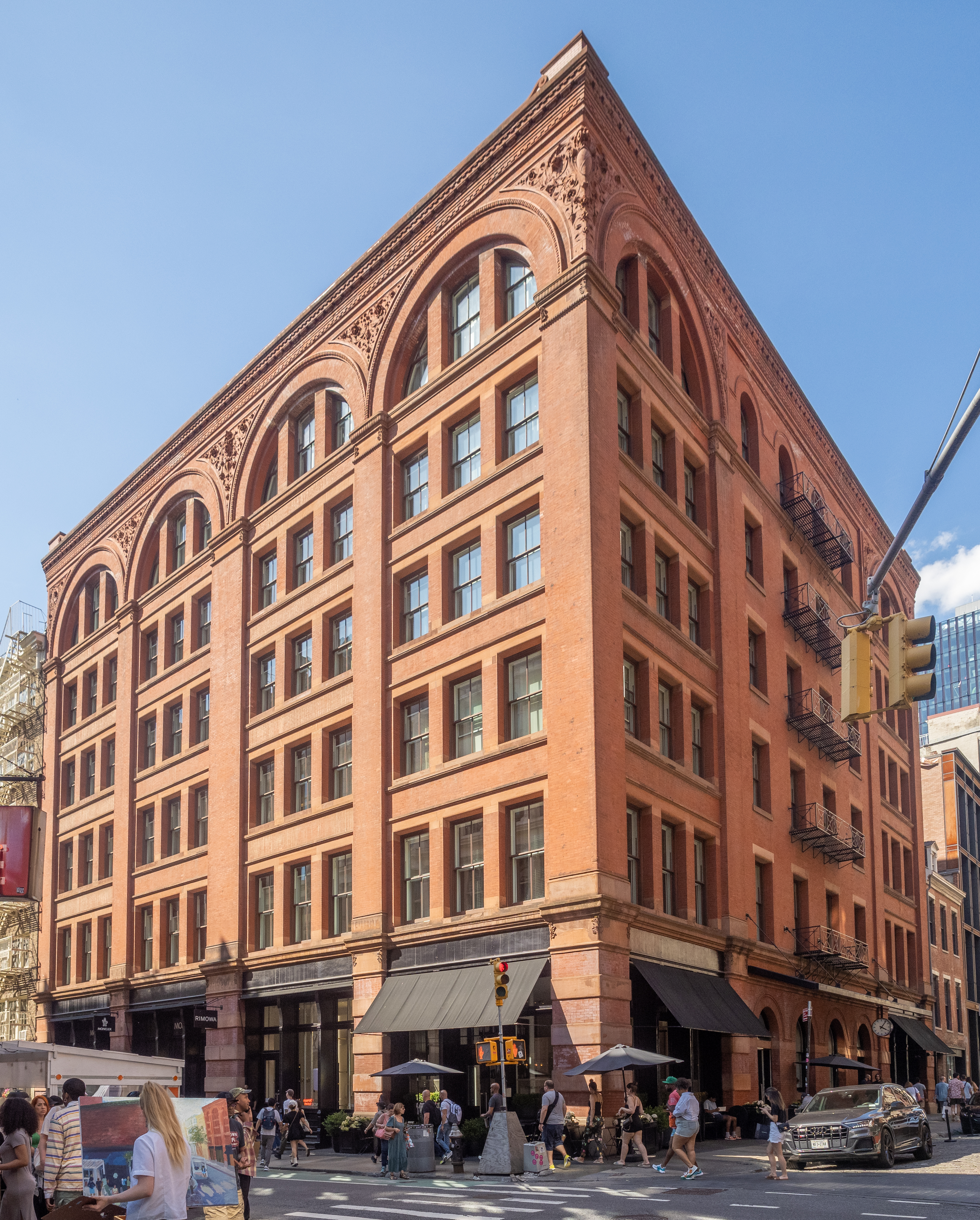
The Mercer Hotel, where Aude Cardona met West and recorded her vocals for the track.

Jay-Z and Kanye West are both American rappers who have collaborated on several tracks together, such as singles like "Swagga Like Us" (2008), "Run This Town" (2009), and "Monster" (2010). In 2010, the two began production and recording together for a collaborative record titled Watch the Throne. One of the album's tracks, "H.A.M." includes additional vocals from opera singer Aude Cardona, who also sings on "Illest Motherfucker Alive". Cardona explained that she once woke up to a message asking if she was an opera singer and did not initially realize it was from West's manager, who was recruiting her for the album. The team knew of Cardona because a friend from Jive Records recommended her to the owner of Electric Lady Studios and she was surprised to record at the location of The Mercer Hotel in SoHo, Manhattan, only meeting West there and thought he was very nice. Cardona found that despite West being clear in his vision, he was willing to listen to other ideas and allowed the singer to improvise for much of her solo parts. She appreciated the song for mixing hip-hop with opera and spent seven hours recording her vocals, delivering many takes in high C notes as she aimed for West's desired combination of gospel and R&B to offer a modern sound.

On January 10, 2011, "H.A.M." leaked via Facebook at midnight and was played over 43,000 times within nine hours, being shared online as an MP3 too. West subsequently tweeted that the song "crashed facebook", attaching the link to a screenshot of an error on the leak's page. From the position of a Watch the Throne contributor, Swizz Beatz said he felt highly positive about Jay-Z and West collaborating "on such a high caliber level" for the song and felt the music industry would be better if more acts did this. In an August 2011 interview with 99 Jamz, Jay-Z described "H.A.M." as a "super intense" song that is difficult to listen to on its own, yet can be experienced differently in the context of Watch the Throne. He called the song a "massive hit record", intending for it to be played at concerts rather than inside homes.

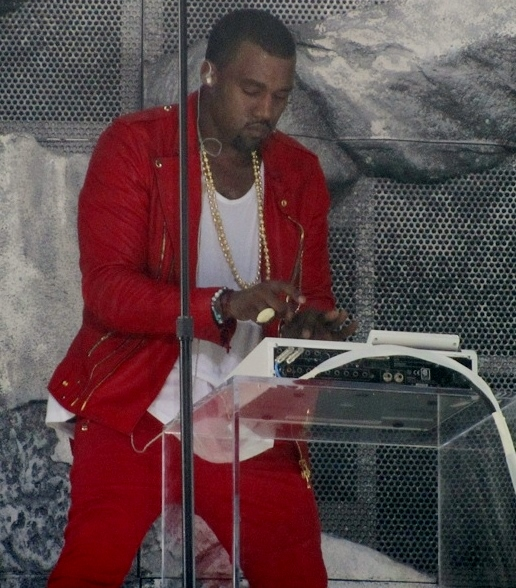
The beat of "H.A.M." was requested by West after Lex Luger played it during sessions for My Beautiful Dark Twisted Fantasy in 2010, then the rapper incorporated his production work up until the song's premiere.

In January 2011, record producer Lex Luger disclosed that Jay-Z and West had recruited him for production on the album. He was not fully certain about this position initially, despite appreciating the opportunity of collaborating with the two. Lex Luger sent them the track for "H.A.M." during recording sessions for West's fifth album My Beautiful Dark Twisted Fantasy in November 2010, standing as one of the two beats the rapper requested to use. He originally provided around eight beats to West when recording in New York, where they worked on the album track "See Me Now". Lex Luger predicted "H.A.M." would be "aggressive and hard", continuing the style of his previous production work in rap from Rick Ross's "B.M.F. (Blowin' Money Fast)" (2010) and Waka Flocka Flame's "Hard in da Paint" (2009). After receiving the track, West added his production work that included a choir and did not allow Lex Luger to listen until it was finalized for the premiere in January 2011. The producer attributed this to West's perfectionist approach, feeling he required his material to be "10 times greater than everything". Sections of the song were kept from recording sessions at Real World Studios in Box, Wiltshire that started in November 2010, after much of Jay-Z and West's material from these sessions had been scrapped. Lex Luger was the lead producer of "H.A.M." and West served as a co-producer, while Mike Dean contributed additional production, and all three of them wrote it alongside Jay-Z.

== Composition and lyrics ==
"H.A.M."
A 26-second sample of "H.A.M.", featuring West emphasizing that he is about to go HAM on the chorus as he is backed by a wailing choir and crashing drums. Jay-Z then raps in double-time about being above his critics in his verse, backed by an electronic beat and stabs of synths combined with fast snare drums from Lex Luger.

Musically, "H.A.M." is a hip-hop, electro, and orchestral song, with elements of techno. It has an aggressive electronic beat, which incorporates a double-time bounce. The song features an icy, rising synth line that contains staccato stabs, combined with Lex Luger's fast snare drums. It also includes hi-hats and cello; the latter was contributed by Christopher "Hitchcock" Chorney. West contributes a verse first and Jay-Z later delivers one, while they perform the chorus once each. Crashing drums appear on the blaring chorus, which features a wailing choir. The song breaks down into an electro-opera coda at around three minutes in, featuring a full-string symphony orchestra, military drums, and the choir singing in an alto-soprano vocal range. Cardona sings over a gospel piano progression, being accompanied by additional vocalist Jacob Lewis Smith at points. The song builds up towards the end, featuring an extended outro. Jay-Z and West both rap in double-time, with the former appearing on a downbeat and semi-singing many of his lines.

West begins his verse on "H.A.M." with a boast that everything was good until a week ago, then "Watch the Throne drops/they kill themselves". He sexualizes white girls in the verse, depicting them as making up for having "asses flat as shit" by giving him head. West emphasizes on the chorus that he is going to go HAM, serving as an acronym for "hard as a motherfucker". Jay-Z addresses critics by presenting himself as above them and discusses upbringing in his verse, referencing family such as his deceased father and nephew. He addresses fellow rapper and label executive Birdman's 2009 comments of his colleague Lil Wayne being a better rapper and richer than him, rapping that he has half a billion and "niggas ain't got my lady money".

== Release and promotion ==
On January 7, 2011, West tweeted the song's black-and-white cover art, which was created by Riccardo Tisci of Givenchy and shows crowns alongside a vicious barking dog. He also announced "H.A.M." would be released as a single on January 11. It was released for digital download in the United States as the album's lead single on the scheduled date, through Jay-Z and West's labels Roc-A-Fella and Def Jam. Def Jam issued the song to contemporary hit and alternative radio stations in Australia on January 17, 2011. Eight days later, it was released to US urban contemporary radio stations in the US by Def Jam and Universal. On August 23, 2011, Def Jam, Roc Nation, and Roc-A-Fella released the deluxe edition of Jay-Z and West's album Watch the Throne, including "H.A.M." as the 14th track.

Following its release, the song was held off the top spot of the iTunes chart by singer Britney Spears's "Hold It Against Me". West tweeted to her "I'm really happy for you and I'mma let you be #1", but insisted "H.A.M." was one of the best songs of all time with "LOL" at the end; this was a reference to his incident with singer Taylor Swift at the 2009 MTV Video Music Awards. The rapper subsequently responded to criticism of his tweet and called out MSNBC for apparently saying he "tried to start a twitter war" with Spears, further tweeting that the media lies about him daily and he was surprised at the song having been able to even reach number two. During a private listening event at The Mercer Hotel on July 7, 2011, Jay-Z said that the song was reflective of the album having been scaled back from its earlier iterations that were more dramatic and intricately planned. Jay-Z and West were reluctant to release the song; the former felt the first single should have featured the two rapping back and forth for three minutes with no hook.

=== Controversy ===
After West played "H.A.M." to Lil Wayne in March 2011, the rapper declared that from his wit and personality he "would probably play off of" Jay-Z's lyrics alluding to him. Lil Wayne strayed away from competing with Jay-Z on the subject to not "box with the god", while refraining from asking West about these lyrics since they were not his. He later rapped a response to Jay-Z on the single "It's Good" in the summer of 2011, telling him he does have his "baby money". Lil Wayne threatened to kidnap his wife Beyoncé as he rapped, "Get that 'how much you love your lady?' money."

== Reception ==
Professional ratings
Review scores
Source	Rating
Beats Per Minute	3/10
Rolling Stone	3/5 stars

"H.A.M." was met with mixed reviews from music critics, with split assessments of the performance styles of Jay-Z and West. In a highly positive review at The Village Voice, Rob Harvilla commented that West focuses on white girls and Jay-Z "plays chicken with a Mack truck", further lauding the chorus' loudness and the ensuing "electro-opera breakdown". Kevin O'Donnell of Spin commended the song's elaborate orchestral production that lives up to the rappers' "outsized baller status" and features a "brash, electronic beat"; he felt West's ambitions continue from My Beautiful Dark Twisted Fantasy on the "weirdest sounding opera ever" from Cardona. The Guardian's Michael Cragg saw it as "an audacious, OTT banger" where echoing drums and icy synths accompany "frantic raps", succeeded by a coda from opera singers with a string section as it seems like "a kitchen sink [is] strummed for good measure". Similarly, Martin Caballero from the Boston Herald expressed that the song meets the expectations set by positive comments from Jay-Z about his work and highlighted the "sense of grandiose decadence" from its beat, which sees West letting his ego go astray "over the Southern-esque double-time bounce" and also appreciated Jay-Z's verse. Caballero observed that the backing switches "to a symphony of crashing drums" and a choir on the chorus, finalizing the song is "dark, weird, bombastic and unapologetically indulgent" like West's album.

Some reviewers considered the music to be unsuitable for Jay-Z and West, a few of whom wrote off the latter's verse. Providing a lukewarm review for Today, Josh Grossberg said "H.A.M." consists of "a robotic backing beat and heavy anthem" that demonstrates the two "virtuoso rapping". He expressed that some of their hardcore fans may laugh at it however, questioning the "scattershot operatic chorus and over-the-top orchestration". Katie Hasty from Uproxx praised the efforts of the rappers in making a "raucous and urgency" song, highlighting the choir and their energy echoing "Monster". She offered West sounds silly on the chorus over instrumentation with a "mechanized drama" invoking the franchise Transformers and Jay-Z seems to enjoy himself more, concluding that the song is too explicit and lacking in content to reach the Top 40, yet indicates a positive outlook for Watch the Throne. Rolling Stone journalist Jody Rosen stated the song has a grand beginning of rising synths that are succeeded by "spooky opera ululating" and it becomes bigger from the choir's singing over the symphony orchestra, setting the expectations for the likes of God or Gandalf. He was disappointed in the attempts to prove greatness from West telling "life itself to suck his dick" and Jay-Z rapping in a slow cadence about his wealth, seeing the two as "kings determined to prove that their thrones aren't easy chairs". For Vulture, Amos Barshad described the song as Jay-Z and West's "brand-new tack" at Waka Flocka Flame's style of music over Lex Luger's production as the two rap about "the brashest shit" that they could have thought of. He said West delivers an "amuse-bouche" of a verse as he discusses white girls "compensating for their flat behinds" and appreciated Jay-Z's verse that "scatters bullets in every direction"; he concluded the song lacks a radio hook and instead shows the two "rapping so intently you can almost see their neck veins bulging".

A few reviewers expressed further disappointment. Although Jessica from Stereogum appreciated Lex Luger's production, she did not consider its style suitable for the performers. Brent Koepp of Beats Per Minute viewed the song as "show-boating" from West after My Beautiful Dark Twisted Fantasy, finding the music to reach a standard below his unique skillset. Koepp felt Jay-Z and West force in elements like the synth and choir to give the song an epicness; he concluded that the rappers focus "way too much" on its theme with their disappointing verses.

== Commercial performance ==
"H.A.M." debuted at number 23 on the US Billboard Hot 100 with 125,000 digital units, entering the Digital Songs chart at number 10. The song lasted for seven weeks on the Hot 100. At the same time as its peak on the Hot 100, the song entered the US Billboard Hot R&B/Hip-Hop Songs chart at number 94. It jumped 46 places for the chart issue dated January 29, 2011, a week before climbing to number 37. The song eventually peaked at number 24 on the chart for March 5. On March 31, 2014, "H.A.M." received a gold certification from the Recording Industry Association of America for amassing 500,000 certified units in the US.

Elsewhere in North America, the track charted at number 47 on the Canadian Hot 100. The track reached number 30 on the UK Singles Chart, while peaking at number 32 on its component Scottish Singles Chart. In Denmark, it debuted at number 35 on the Danish Tracklisten Top 40. The track further reached number 40 on the Irish Singles Chart. It peaked within the top 100 of Austria, the Netherlands, and Australia.

== Live performances and other usage ==
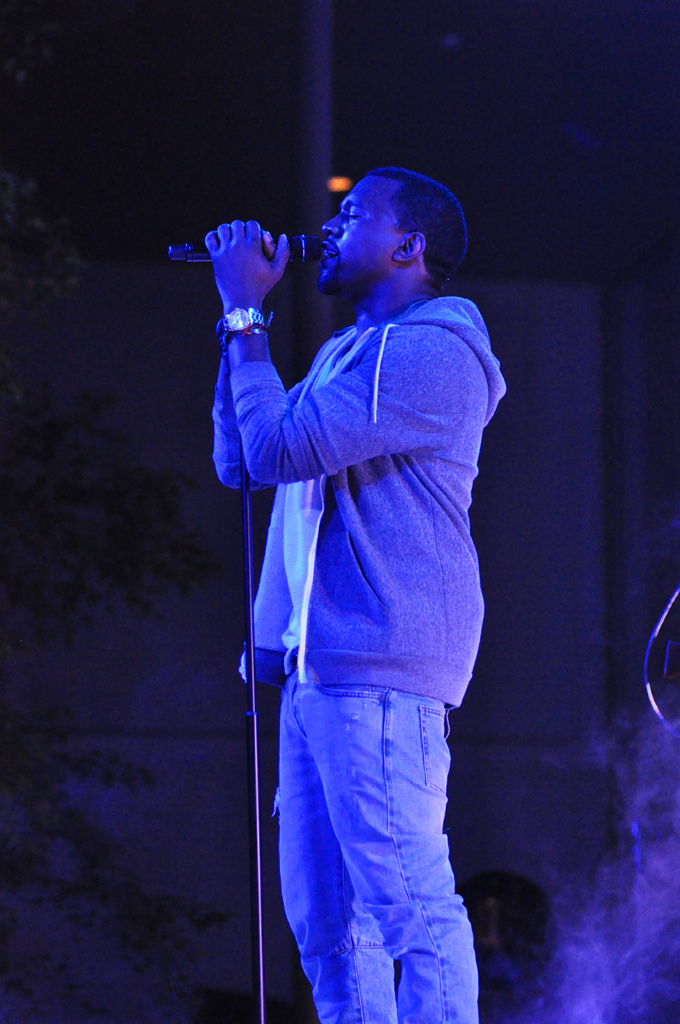
West performing at the annual party for the Museum of Modern Art in May 2011, where he brought out Jay-Z for the song.

In February 2011, West delivered a solo rendition of the song during the premiere party for Nike's The Black Mamba. On March 19, Jay-Z and West performed it during Vevo's GOOD Music show for South by Southwest (SXSW) at an abandoned power plant in Austin, Texas. The performers entered the stage as fireworks went off in the sky above and West rapped along with Jay-Z during his verse, looking him directly in the face. A few months after the performance, it was uploaded to YouTube by VEVO in July 2011. On May 10, West brought out Jay-Z to perform the song towards the end of his benefit concert for the annual party of the Museum of Modern Art in Manhattan, New York.

At festivals such as Mawazine, Splendour in the Grass, and The Big Chill from the spring to summer of 2011, West used "H.A.M." as the introduction to his set lists. He emerged on a white podium with the accompaniment of phoenix dancers on stage during the festivals, backed by a classical portrait of Athena and Nike fighting Alcyoneus. For the introduction to his headlining set at Coachella, West used a string remix of the song that consisted of violin from music programmer Laura Escudé. During Jay-Z and West's Watch the Throne Tour that ran from 2011 until 2012, they performed the song as the opening number. The rappers performed it for Samsung Galaxy's SXSW concert at the Austin Music Hall on March 12, 2014, accompanied by a 12-foot video cube at the center of the stage.

On January 18, 2011, rapper Busta Rhymes shared a remix of "H.A.M." that added a verse from him. Eight days later, XV released his track over the beat for "H.A.M." The version added "Heroes Amongst Men" to the title and in contrast to the original, XV raps on the operatic outro. On February 17, 2011, Lupe Fiasco freestyled over the song on Tim Westwood's radio show in the lead up to the release of his third album Lasers. In March 2012, "H.A.M." was used for the teen comedy film Project X. During an appearance for Peter Rosenberg on Hot 97 in July, Odd Future members Tyler, The Creator, Earl Sweatshirt, and Domo Genesis each delivered sandwich-themed freestyles over the song.

== Credits and personnel ==
Credits are adapted from the album's liner notes.

Recording

- Recorded at Real World Studios (Wiltshire, UK) and (The Mercer) Hotel (New York)
- Mixed at (The Mercer) Hotel (New York)

Personnel

- Kanye West – songwriter, co-production
- Jay-Z – songwriter
- Lex Luger – songwriter, production
- Mike Dean – songwriter, additional production, mix engineer, cello arrangement
- Noah Goldstein – recording engineer
- Mat Arnold – assistant recording engineer
- Christopher "Hitchcock" Chorney – cello
- Aude Cardona – additional vocals
- Jacob Lewis Smith – additional vocals
- Riccardo Tisci – creative direction

== Charts ==
=== Weekly charts ===
Chart performance for "H.A.M."
Chart (2011)	Peak position
Australia (ARIA)	78
Austria (Ö3 Austria Top 40)	56
Canada Hot 100 (Billboard)	47
Denmark (Tracklisten)	35
Ireland (IRMA)	40
Mexico Ingles Airplay (Billboard)	34
Netherlands (Mega Single Top 100)	53
Scottish Singles Sales (Official Charts)	32
UK Singles (Official Charts)	30
US Billboard Hot 100	23
US Hot R&B/Hip-Hop Songs (Billboard)	24
US Hot Rap Songs (Billboard)	14

=== Year-end charts ===
2011 year-end chart performance for "H.A.M."
Chart (2011)	Position
US Hot R&B/Hip-Hop Songs (Billboard)	96

== Certifications ==
Certifications for "H.A.M."
Region	Certification	Certified units/sales
United States (RIAA)	Platinum	1,000,000^{‡}
^{‡} Sales+streaming figures based on certification alone.

== Release history ==
Release dates and formats for "H.A.M."
Country	Date	Format	Label(s)	Ref.
United States	January 11, 2011	Digital download	Roc-A-Fella; Def Jam	
Ukraine	January 12, 2011	Digital download	Roc-A-Fella; Def Jam	
Australia	January 17, 2011	Contemporary hit radio	Def Jam; Universal Music	
Australia	January 17, 2011	Alternative radio	Def Jam; Universal Music	
United States	January 25, 2011	Urban contemporary radio	Def Jam	
