= Island Holiday =

Song by Lil Wayne

from the album Tha Carter VI
- Released: June 6, 2025
- Length: 4:17
- Label: Young Money; Republic
- Songwriters: Dwayne Carter; Manny Galvez; Julian Munro; Rivers Cuomo
- Producers: Lil Wayne; Manny Galvez; Julian Munro

"Island Holiday" is a song by American rapper Lil Wayne. It was released on June 6, 2025, as the tenth track from his fourteenth studio album, Tha Carter VI. Produced by Wayne, Manny G, and Julian Munro, the song samples Weezer's 2001 song "Island in the Sun".

== Background ==
Lil Wayne and Weezer previously collaborated on the song "Can't Stop Partying", which appeared on Weezer's seventh studio album, Raditude (2009).

== Critical reception ==
"Island Holiday" received mostly negative reviews from music critics. Mosi Reeves of Rolling Stone called the song "otherwise awful". Jack Butler-Terry of Stereoboard called the song "a weak, dated attempt to bother the charts via a sample of Weezer's Island In The Sun." Paul Thompson of Pitchfork said, "It is all but impossible to imagine a song like 'Island Vacation' becoming a crossover hit, and all but impossible to imagine Wayne would make it for any other reason". Reviewer Anthony Fantano of The Needle Drop said the song "sounds like shit", saying, "I'm not just saying that because the track is a horrendous interpolation of Weezer's "Island in the Sun". But there are multiple portions of the song where it just sounds like Wayne has five or four different autotune layers of his voice all singing in unison, and they are not in harmony at all."

In a ranking of the album's nineteen songs, Billboard's Michael Saponara placed it at number thirteen. He said, "Parts of the track seem to work, but others just feel like Wayne's lost on the island he's rapping about".

== Personnel ==
Credits adapted from Tidal.

- Lil Wayne – producer, composer, lyricist, recording engineer
- Manny Galvez – producer, composer, lyricist, recording engineer
- Julian Munro – producer, composer, lyricist
- Rivers Cuomo – composer, lyricist

== Charts ==
Chart performance for "Island Holiday"
Chart (2025)	Peak position
US Bubbling Under Hot 100 (Billboard)	5
US Hot R&B/Hip-Hop Songs (Billboard)	27
