= Bells (Lil Wayne song) =

2025 song by Lil Wayne

Song by Lil Wayne

from the album Tha Carter VI
- Released: June 6, 2025
- Genre: Hip hop
- Length: 3:24
- Label: Young Money; Republic
- Songwriters: Dwayne Carter Jr.; Frederick Rubin; James Smith; Manny Galvez
- Producers: Lil Wayne; Manny G

"Bells" is a song by American rapper Lil Wayne from his fourteenth studio album, Tha Carter VI. It was co-written and produced by Manny Galvez. It contains an interpolation of "Rock the Bells" by LL Cool J. The song peaked at number 65 on the Billboard Hot 100 and number 18 on the Hot R&B/Hip-Hop Songs charts.

At his Madison Square Garden performance, Wayne brought out LL Cool J to perform "Rock the Bells".

== Critical reception ==
Paul Attard of Slant Magazine called it "clumsy interpolation" of LL Cool J's classic song. Fred Thomas of AllMusic was more positive, where the old school hip-hop track helps in "refitting the beat with Wayne's stream-of-consciousness, rapid-fire bars."

== Charts ==
Chart performance for "Bells"
Chart (2025)	Peak position
New Zealand Hot Singles (RMNZ)	31
US Billboard Hot 100	65
US Hot R&B/Hip-Hop Songs (Billboard)	18
