= Banned from NO =

2025 song by Lil Wayne

Song by Lil Wayne

from the album Tha Carter VI
- Released: June 6, 2025
- Genre: Hip-hop
- Length: 3:38
- Label: Young Money; Republic
- Songwriters: Dwayne Carter; Mario Jefferson; Darius Ginn Jr.; Victor Santiago Jr.; Christopher Rios; Cameron Giles; Jason Phillips; Jermain Baxter; David Styles; Kasseem Dean
- Producers: TheNightAftr; Kamo

"Banned from NO" is a song by American rapper Lil Wayne from his fourteenth studio album, Tha Carter VI. Produced by TheNightAftr and Kamo, it samples the fanfare from "Banned from T.V." by Noreaga featuring Big Pun, Nature, Cam'ron, Jadakiss, and Styles P. An official remix of the song with Trinidadian rapper Nicki Minaj was released on June 11, 2025.

== Critical reception ==
Reviewing Tha Carter VI for Slant Magazine, Paul Attard considered the song one of the album's "high points", which he also described as "little more than reminders of the baseline competence that Wayne was once capable of" and "offer scant evidence that he's still evolving as an artist". Paul A. Thompson of Pitchfork was critical of the song, commenting "The chorus of 'Banned From NO' is a barrage of rhyming phrases ('The cocaine whiter/The rope chain brighter/The choke chain tighter/The close-range sniper/The dope-game lifer…') delivered with such sleepy obligation as to become totally uninteresting."

== Remix ==
"Banned from NO (Remix)"

Remix by Lil Wayne featuring Nicki Minaj

from the album Tha Carter VI
- Released: June 11, 2025
- Length: 3:23
- Label: Young Money; Republic Records
- Songwriters: Dwayne Carter; Onika Maraj; Joshua Goods; Victor Santiago Jr.; Darius Ginn Jr.; Mario Jefferson; Christopher Rios; Cameron Giles; Jason Phillips; Jermain Baxter; David Styles; Kasseem Dean
- Producers: TheNightAftr; Kamo

The official remix with Nicki Minaj and was released on June 11, 2025 as a bonus track from Tha Carter VI. Prior to its release, Lil Wayne was rumored to have a collaboration with Minaj on Tha Carter VI and fans were initially disappointed when Minaj did not appear on the album. On the remix, Nicki Minaj references NBA teams Indiana Pacers, New York Knicks, and Los Angeles Lakers in double entendres, as well as the 2025 NBA Finals, before performing her verse. Minaj references her recent cover on Vogue and shouts out to her hometown of Jamaica, Queens, in addition to taking shots at NFL player-turned-podcast host Shannon Sharpe, followed by a reference to Lil Wayne's line "The 'F' is for 'phenomenal'" on his song "Yes". Minaj ends her verse with a diss toward Jay-Z and the NFL, criticizing them for not choosing Lil Wayne to perform at the Super Bowl LIX halftime show.

After the release of the remix, Nicki Minaj wrote on X that her line about Shannon Sharpe was a response to him replying "Nicki who?" when told that Minaj was interested in appearing on his podcast. She also revealed she almost dissed Sharpe's co-host Ochocinco on the podcast Nightcap in the song. Sharpe subsequently apologized to Nicki on Nightcap.

== Charts ==
Chart performance for "Banned from NO"
Chart (2025)	Peak position
US Billboard Hot 100	61
US Hot R&B/Hip-Hop Songs (Billboard)	15
