= Tha Carter VI =

Studio album by Lil Wayne
- Released: June 6, 2025
- Recorded: 2013/2014–2025
- Genre: Hip-hop
- Length: 67:49
- Labels: Young Money; Republic
- Producers: Adams Awake; Alex Lustig; Ben Billions; Bobby Raps; Boi-1da; Charlie Handsome; Chris XZ; Coleman; DJ Clue; DVLP; Einer Bankz; Fierce; Harley Arsenault; Infamous; Kamo; Keyboard Kid; Lil Wayne; Lin-Manuel Miranda; Mannie Fresh; Manny G; MarcLo; Midi Jones; Mod Sun; Munro; ONHEL; RedOne; Rex Kudo; Rizzo; Synco; Swede; TheNightAftr; Wheezy

Lil Wayne chronology
Welcome 2 Collegrove (2023)	Tha Carter VI (2025)

Tha Carter albums chronology
Tha Carter V (2018)	Tha Carter VI (2025)

Tha Carter VI is the fourteenth solo studio album by the American rapper Lil Wayne. Released on June 6, 2025, by Young Money and Republic Records, it serves as the sixth installment of Tha Carter album series. It follows his collaborative album with 2 Chainz, Welcome 2 Collegrove (2023), and marks seven years since its predecessor Tha Carter V (2018). It is his first solo album in five years since his album Funeral (2020).

The album features guest appearances from BigXthaPlug, Jay Jones, Jelly Roll, Big Sean, Bono, 2 Chainz, Andrea Bocelli, Wyclef Jean, Mannie Fresh, MGK, Kodak Black, and Wayne's sons Kameron Carter and Lil Novi. The bonus edition contains features from Nicki Minaj, Future, and Lil Baby, while the physical release contains a feature from Trippie Redd. Production was handled by a variety of producers, including Ben Billions, Bobby Raps, Boi-1da, Charlie Handsome, DJ Clue, DVLP, Infamous, Lin-Manuel Miranda, Einer Bankz, Synco, Mannie Fresh, and Wheezy, among others.

The album debuted at number two on the Billboard 200, with first-week sales of 108,000 album-equivalent units, out of which 35,000 were pure album sales.

== Background and recording ==
If there's one thing about this album that's different, it's me approaching it like, "Man, what would I sound like on something with such and such?"

— Wayne, on his approach to the album

Prior to the release of Tha Carter VI, Wayne was the featured cover story for Rolling Stone's May 2025 issue. He spoke about the background and recording of the album, while also speaking about its potential collaborators. He revealed that Kanye West and Wheezy had production on the album; however, the former's assisted track would potentially be removed due to the recent controversy surrounding West. It was also revealed that Miley Cyrus, Andrea Bocelli, and his son Kameron would be possible features on the record. There is also a yet-to-be cleared Billie Eilish sample, who was mistakenly credited as a feature until the publication's correction.

Fellow artist and collaborator, Wyclef Jean, played a major role in the production and recording of the album. He stated that he and Wayne recorded over 30 tracks for the album: "Leaving Wyclef Jean and Lil Wayne in a studio for 24 hours is a dangerous thing. You don't know what's going to pop out".

== Release and promotion ==
After Lil Wayne declared that Tha Carter V would be his final album, Young Thug announced that his debut album would be titled Tha Carter VI in honor of Wayne. This led to Wayne's displeasure, in part contributed to troubles with his former Cash Money Records label boss, Birdman, whom he later sued due to financial disputes. With the threat of legal action, Young Thug renamed his project to Barter 6.

Tha Carter VI is a sequel to Tha Carter V, which was released in 2018. In an interview with Variety on July 3, 2020, Lil Wayne was asked which album from Tha Carter album series was his favorite, to which Wayne replied, "the next one", and refrained from going into detail. In August, Wayne announced Tha Carter VI while stating that his mixtape, No Ceilings 3, would be released before it.

On August 6, 2022, Wayne, alongside Drake and Nicki Minaj, held a Young Money Reunion Concert in Toronto during which he hinted at the release of Tha Carter VI: "I'm working on Carter VI, coming soon". Following the concert, through the Young Money Instagram page, Wayne shared a pre-save link for the album. In September, Wayne was spotted in the studio with Juelz Santana, captioning the post, "CARTER 6 In Process...#ICFMF".

On September 29, 2023, Wayne released the mixtape Tha Fix Before Tha VI, building fan anticipation for the album's release.

On January 20, 2025, in an interview posted on social media by AT&T at the 2025 College Football Playoff National Championship, Wayne stated that Tha Carter VI would be "guaranteed" to release in 2025. On February 9, 2025, Cetaphil broadcast a local commercial starring Lil Wayne during Super Bowl LIX in the New Orleans market. After joking about not being selected for the halftime show, the performer retreated into a recording studio with signs on its door reading "CARTER VI" and "DO NOT DISTURB 'TIL 06-06-2025". Republic Records subsequently confirmed that The Carter VI was scheduled to be released on June 6, 2025.

On April 22, 2025, Wayne announced his first-ever solo headline at Madison Square Garden that would be held on the same night of his album's release. Two hours later, he unveiled the official cover artwork of Tha Carter VI, depicting his baby self with facial tattoos in the similar manner of his previous Tha Carter records. He captioned in the post, "Captain Carter C6" followed by a double post, "June 6 We C6 The Carter Six June 6 We C6 Ain't a problem I can't 6 June 6."

On June 3, 2025, Wayne announced his tour of the same name in support of the album. The tour began on June 6, 2025, in New York City and concluded on October 2, 2025, in West Palm Beach. On June 5, 2025, a promotional ad on ESPN for the 2025 NBA Finals featuring the album single "The Days", featuring Bono, was aired.

== Commercial performance ==
Tha Carter VI debuted at number two on the US Billboard 200 with 108,000 album-equivalent units. Of that sum, stream equivalent album units comprise 73,000 (equaling 97.06 million on-demand streams), album sales comprise 34,000, and track equivalent album units comprise 1,000.

== Critical reception ==
Professional ratings
Aggregate scores
Source	Rating
Metacritic	50/100
Review scores
Source	Rating
AllMusic	3/5 stars
Clash	8/10
Pitchfork	2.9/10
RapReviews	4/10
Rolling Stone	3/5 stars
Slant Magazine	1.5/5 stars
Spectrum Culture	54%
Stereoboard	2/5 stars

Tha Carter VI received mixed to negative reviews from critics. According to the review aggregator Metacritic, Tha Carter VI received "mixed or average reviews" based on a weighted average score of 50 out of 100 from 6 critic scores. Robin Murray of Clash magazine wrote that the album "doesn't reach the heights of III but probably crests V". Murray highlighted "Hip-Hop", "Bein Myself", and "Cotton Candy" as "[t]he best cuts", believing them to be among Lil Wayne's "finest work". In a more critical review, Paul Attard of Slant Magazine referred to Tha Carter VI as "one of Wayne's most meandering, insular, and uninspired to date", though he identified "Banned from NO" and "Hip-Hop" as the album's high points.

Meanwhile, Mosi Reeves of Rolling Stone felt that Wayne's once groundbreaking sound evolved into a more mainstream pop persona. While Wayne still delivered punchlines and incorporated old school hip-hop samples, there lacked a sense of urgency and fans who resonated better with his past music. AllMusic's Fred Thomas felt the song "Bein' Myself" to be sentiment of the rapper's earlier works. However, he continued that most of the tracks "miss," describing these as "loud and bewildering," such as the beat for "If I Played Guitar" or Bono's hook on "The Days". Paul Thompson of Pitchfork was less favorable in his review, feeling the album was not well-thought-out and "nearly every verse defaults to the same dense, superficially complex style". Michael G. Barilleaux of RapReviews called the album "an album that feels more akin to an oddly shaped misfire of a satirical take than it does the latest installation of an ultra-successful series of rap albums." Kabelo Chirwa of Spectrum Culture said, "Wayne can bring poignant bars between the bravado and violence. However, many of the out-of-pocket bars and explicit punchlines just hit different coming from a 42-year-old father."

== Track listing ==
Standard edition
No.	Title	Writer(s)	Producer(s)	Length
1.	"King Carter"	Dwayne Carter; Manny Galvez; Christopher Townsend	Lil Wayne; Manny G; Chris XZ	1:48
2.	"Welcome to Tha Carter"	D. Carter; Angel Alponte	Onhel	3:35
3.	"Bells"	D. Carter; Galvez; James Smith; Frederick Rubin	Lil Wayne; Manny G	3:24
4.	"Hip-Hop" (with BigXthaPlug featuring Jay Jones)	D. Carter; Xavier Landum; Ronald Jones; Marco Rodriguez-Diaz; Alexander Wu; Einer Bankz; Benjamin Diehl	Infamous; Synco; Einer Bankz; Ben Billions	4:01
5.	"Sharks" (with Jelly Roll and Big Sean)	D. Carter; Jason DeFord; Sean Anderson; Taylor Phillips; Rocky Block; Jordan Schmidt; Jaxson Free; Julian Harris; Matthew Samuels; Scotty Coleman; Amir Sims	Boi-1da; COLEMAN; Fierce	3:49
6.	"Banned from NO"	D. Carter; Mario Jefferson; Darius Ginn Jr.; Victor Santiago Jr.; Christopher Rios; Cameron Giles; Jason Phillips; Jermain Baxter; David Styles; Kasseem Dean	TheNightAftr; Kamo	3:38
7.	"The Days" (with Bono)	D. Carter; Paul Hewson; Rami Yacoub; Carl Falk; Simon Carmody; Nadir Khayat; Bigram Zayas	RedOne; DVLP	4:21
8.	"Cotton Candy" (with 2 Chainz)	D. Carter; Tauheed Epps; Galvez; Roberto Curti	Lil Wayne; Manny G; Swede	3:26
9.	"Flex Up"	D. Carter; Ryan Vojtesak; Robert Richardson; Masamune Kudo	Charlie Handsome; Bobby Raps; Rex Kudo	2:50
10.	"Island Holiday"	D. Carter; Galvez; Julian Munro; Rivers Cuomo	Lil Wayne; Manny G; Munro	4:17
11.	"Loki's Theme"	D. Carter; Ernesto Shaw; Galvez; Munro	DJ Clue; Rizzo; Amiri^{[c]}; Manny G^{[a]}; Munro^{[a]}	4:10
12.	"If I Played Guitar"	D. Carter; Patrick Beta; Marcus Lomax; Midi Jones	MarcLo; M. Jones	2:52
13.	"Peanuts 2 N Elephant"	D. Carter; Lin-Manuel Miranda	Miranda	3:12
14.	"Rari" (with Kameron Carter)	D. Carter; Kameron Carter; Wesley Glass; Richardson	Wheezy; Bobby Raps	2:50
15.	"Maria" (featuring Andrea Bocelli and Wyclef Jean)	D. Carter; Andrea Bocelli; Wyclef Jean	Lil Wayne; Jean; Wavie Boi^{[c]}	3:23
16.	"Bein Myself" (featuring Mannie Fresh)	D. Carter; Byron Thomas; Brian Holland; Lamont Dozier; Edward Holland; Richard Wylie	Mannie Fresh	4:39
17.	"Mula Komin In" (with Lil Novi)	D. Carter; Neal Carter; Gregory Phillips; Adam Oyenuga	Keyboard Kid; Adams Awake	3:51
18.	"Alone in the Studio with My Gun" (with MGK and Kodak Black)	D. Carter; Colson Baker; Bill Kapri; Derek Smith	Mod Sun; No Love for the Middle Child^{[a]}	2:52
19.	"Written History"	D. Carter; Glass; Harley Arsenault; Alex Lustig	Wheezy; Arsenault; Lustig	4:42
Total length:				67:49

Tha Carter VI (Bonus) additional tracks
No.	Title	Writer(s)	Producer(s)	Length
20.	"Banned from NO" (remix; with Nicki Minaj)	D. Carter; Onika Maraj; Joshua Goods; Jefferson; Ginn; Santiago; Rios; Giles; Phillips; Baxter; Styles; Dean	TheNightAftr; Kamo	3:23
21.	"Momma Don't Worry" (featuring Future and Lil Baby)	D. Carter; Nayvadius Cash; Dominique Jones; Jacob Canady	ATL Jacob; RushDee	3:51
Total length:				69:23

Physical edition bonus tracks
No.	Title	Writer(s)	Producer(s)	Length
20.	"Geeked" (featuring Trippie Redd)	D. Carter; Michael White IV	TheNightAftr; Kamo	3:43
21.	"Actin' Funny"	D. Carter	Manny G
22.	"Louisiana Hot Sauce"	D. Carter

Notes

- ^{^[c]} signifies a co-producer
- ^{^[a]} signifies an additional producer

Sample and interpolation credits

- "Bells" contains a sample of "Rock the Bells", written by James Todd Smith and Frederick Rubin, as performed by LL Cool J.
- "Banned from NO" contains a sample of "Banned from T.V.", written by Victor Santiago, Christopher Rios, Jermain Baxter, Jason Phillips, David Styles, Cameron Giles, and Kasseem Dean, as performed by N.O.R.E.
- "Island Holiday" contains an interpolation of "Island in the Sun", written by Rivers Cuomo and performed by Weezer.
- "Maria" contains a sample of "Ave Maria", an aria composed by Vladimir Vavilov, and performed by Andrea Bocelli.

== Charts ==
=== Weekly charts ===
Weekly chart performance for Tha Carter VI
Chart (2025)	Peak position
Australian Hip Hop/R&B Albums (ARIA)	29
Austrian Albums (Ö3 Austria)	57
Belgian Albums (Ultratop Flanders)	163
Belgian Albums (Ultratop Wallonia)	156
Canadian Albums (Billboard)	14
Dutch Albums (Album Top 100)	92
German Albums (Offizielle Top 100)	81
New Zealand Albums (RMNZ)	31
Nigerian Albums (TurnTable)	51
Scottish Albums (Official Charts)	96
Swiss Albums (Schweizer Hitparade)	39
UK Albums (Official Charts)	77
UK R&B Albums (Official Charts)	5
US Billboard 200	2
US Top R&B/Hip-Hop Albums (Billboard)	1

=== Year-end charts ===
Year-end chart performance for Tha Carter VI
Chart (2025)	Position
US Top R&B/Hip-Hop Albums (Billboard)	70

== Release history ==
Release dates and formats for Tha Carter VI
Region	Date	Label(s)	Format(s)	Edition(s)	Ref.
Various	June 6, 2025	Young Money; Republic	CD; LP; digital download; streaming	Standard	
Various	June 11, 2025	Young Money; Republic	Digital download; streaming	Bonus	

== See also ==
- 2025 in hip hop music
