= Sharks (Lil Wayne, Jelly Roll and Big Sean song) =

2025 song by Lil Wayne, Jelly Roll and Big Sean

Song by Lil Wayne, Jelly Roll and Big Sean

from the album Tha Carter VI
- Released: June 6, 2025
- Genre: Hip-hop
- Length: 3:49
- Label: Young Money; Republic
- Songwriters: Dwayne Carter; Jason DeFord; Sean Anderson; Taylor Phillips; Rocky Block; Jordan Schmidt; Jaxson Free; Julian Harris; Matthew Samuels; Scotty Coleman; Amir Sims
- Producers: Boi-1da; COLEMAN; Fierce

"Sharks" is a song by American rappers Lil Wayne, Jelly Roll and Big Sean, released on June 6, 2025, from Wayne's fourteenth studio album, Tha Carter VI. It was produced by Boi-1da, COLEMAN and Fierce.

== Background ==
Jelly Roll's wife Bunnie Xo revealed in a video on TikTok that the song's hook was written by their eight-year-old son Noah.

== Content ==
Jelly Roll performs the chorus, crooning "Snakes ain't always in the grass / Sharks ain't always in the water / Thieves ain't always in the night / God ain't always at the altar". In the lyrics, Lil Wayne and Big Sean rap about protecting oneself from those who may be plotting against one and the importance of continuing to strive for improvement. Sean delivers his verse at a particularly quick pace.

== Critical reception ==
Maxim Mower of Holler wrote "As we would expect from a track that features both Lil Wayne and Big Sean, 'Sharks' is packed with punchlines and double-entendres, with each MC showcasing their lyrical dexterity." Zachary Horvath of HotNewHipHop praised Jelly Roll's performance, remarking that "the Jelly Roll aspect is the most intriguing part of 'Sharks,' especially since it goes over well" and "he lends a perfectly eerie chorus here, especially with his wary lyrics." Conversely, Fred Thomas of AllMusic criticized the song, stating "Jelly Roll garbles through the faux country hook on the barely listenable 'Sharks'".

== Charts ==
Chart performance for "Sharks"
| Chart (2025) | Peak position |
|---|---|
| New Zealand Hot Singles (Recorded Music NZ) | 38 |
| US Billboard Hot 100 | 54 |
| US Hot R&B/Hip-Hop Songs (Billboard) | 12 |
