= Sorry for the Wait 2 Tour =

2015 concert tour by Lil Wayne

Sorry For The Wait 2 Tour
- Tour by Lil Wayne
- Location: North America
- Associated album: Sorry 4 the Wait 2
- Start date: March 12, 2015
- End date: May 31, 2015
- Legs: 1
- No. of shows: 18
- Box office: $30 Million

Lil Wayne concert chronology
- Drake Vs. Lil Wayne (2014); Sorry For The Wait 2 Tour (2015); The Dedication Tour (2016)

The Sorry For The Wait 2 Tour (also called the Sorry For The Wait 2 Club Tour and Sorry For The Wait 2 Release Party Tour) was a 2015 concert tour by American rapper Lil Wayne aimed at promoting his new album Sorry 4 the Wait 2. It began on March 12, 2015, in Kansas City, Kansas, and concluded on May 31, 2015 in St. Louis Missouri; for a total combination of 18 shows.

== Background ==
Amidst an ongoing dispute with record label Cash Money, Wayne would state that Sorry For The Wait 2 was an “important mixtape”, and would therefore throw out a set of dates for Night Clubs all around the country to perform live at.

== Track list ==
1. Flicka Da Wrist
2. Fingers Hurting
3. Coco
4. Only
5. Truffle Butter
6. Steady Mobbin'

== Tour Dates ==
Edmonton

Winnipeg

Vancouver

Toronto
