= Tha Carter VI Tour =

2025 concert tour by Lil Wayne

- Tour by Lil Wayne
- Location: North America
- Associated album: Tha Carter VI
- Start date: June 6, 2025
- End date: October 23, 2026
- Legs: 1
- No. of shows: 36
- Supporting acts: Tyga; NoCap; Belly Gang Kushington; Gudda Gudda; Lil Novi; Lil Twist; Lucifina; Jay Jones; 2 Chainz; The Game

Lil Wayne concert chronology
- The HotBoys Reunion Tour (2024); Tha Carter VI Tour (2025—26)

Tha Carter VI Tour was a concert tour by American rapper Lil Wayne in promotion of his album of the same name. It began on June 6, 2025, in New York City, New York, and concluded on October 2, 2025, in West Palm Beach, Florida, consisting of 36 shows. An extension, subtitled 20 Years of Carter Classics, began on July 2, 2026 in Saratoga Springs, and is scheduled to end on October 23, 2026 in Knoxville, Tennessee.

== Background ==
On February 9, 2025, Wayne announced that his album, Tha Carter VI would be released on June 6. Months later, on April 22, Wayne announced his first-ever solo headline at Madison Square Garden, the same night as the album release. On June 3, Wayne officially announced the tour. On March 17, 2026, Wayne revealed more dates of the tour as an extension named "20 Years of Carter Classics", set to begin in July and end in October. Rappers 2 Chainz and The Game were announced as opening acts for the tour.

== Tour dates ==
Date	City	Country	Venue	Supporting act(s)	Attendance	Revenue
2025
June 6, 2025	New York City	United States	Madison Square Garden	—N/a	TBA	TBA
July 30, 2025	Bristow	United States	Jiffy Lube Live	Tyga, Belly Gang Kushington	TBA	TBA
August 1, 2025	Virginia Beach	United States	Veterans United Home Loans Amphitheater	Tyga, NoCap, Belly Gang Kushington	TBA	TBA
August 2, 2025	Atlantic City	United States	Boardwalk Hall	Tyga, Belly Gang Kushington	TBA	TBA
August 3, 2025	Holmdel Township	United States	PNC Bank Arts Center	Tyga, Belly Gang Kushington	TBA	TBA
August 5, 2025	Hartford	United States	Xfinity Theatre	Tyga, Belly Gang Kushington	TBA	TBA
August 6, 2025	Mansfield	United States	Xfinity Center	Tyga, Belly Gang Kushington	TBA	TBA
August 8, 2025	Syracuse	United States	Empower Federal Credit Union Amphitheater	Tyga, Belly Gang Kushington	TBA	TBA
August 9, 2025	Buffalo	United States	Darien Lake Performing Arts Center	Tyga, Belly Gang Kushington	TBA	TBA
~~August 11, 2025~~^{[a]}	~~Toronto~~	~~Canada~~	~~Budweiser Stage~~	Tyga, Belly Gang Kushington	TBA	TBA
August 14, 2025	Cuyahoga Falls	United States	Blossom Music Center	Tyga, Belly Gang Kushington	TBA	TBA
August 16, 2025	Cincinnati	United States	Riverbend Music Center	Tyga, Belly Gang Kushington	TBA	TBA
August 17, 2025	Noblesville	United States	Ruoff Music Center	Tyga, Belly Gang Kushington	TBA	TBA
August 20, 2025	Minneapolis	United States	Target Center	Tyga, Belly Gang Kushington	TBA	TBA
August 22, 2025	Milwaukee	United States	American Family Insurance Amphitheater	Tyga, Belly Gang Kushington	TBA	TBA
August 23, 2025	Detroit	United States	Little Caesars Arena	Tyga, Belly Gang Kushington	TBA	TBA
August 24, 2025	Tinley Park	United States	Credit Union 1 Amphitheatre	Tyga, Belly Gang Kushington	TBA	TBA
August 26, 2025	Kansas City	United States	T-Mobile Arena	Tyga, Belly Gang Kushington	TBA	TBA
August 29, 2025	Phoenix	United States	Talking Stick Resort Amphitheatre	Tyga, Belly Gang Kushington	TBA	TBA
September 1, 2025	Ridgefield	United States	RV Inn Style Resorts Amphitheater	Tyga, Belly Gang Kushington	TBA	TBA
September 3, 2025	Seattle	United States	Climate Pledge Arena	Tyga, Belly Gang Kushington	TBA	TBA
September 5, 2025	Mountain View	United States	Shoreline Amphitheatre	Tyga, Belly Gang Kushington	TBA	TBA
September 6, 2025	Sacramento	United States	Golden 1 Center	Tyga, Belly Gang Kushington	TBA	TBA
September 10, 2025	Chula Vista	United States	North Island Credit Union Amphitheatre	Tyga, Belly Gang Kushington	TBA	TBA
September 12, 2025	Los Angeles	United States	Crypto.com Arena	Tyga, Belly Gang Kushington	TBA	TBA
~~September 14, 2025~~^{[b]}	~~Albuquerque~~	United States	~~Isleta Amphitheater~~	Tyga, Belly Gang Kushington	TBA	TBA
September 16, 2025	Austin	United States	Germania Insurance Amphitheater	Tyga, Belly Gang Kushington	TBA	TBA
September 17, 2025	Dallas	United States	Dos Equis Pavilion	Tyga, Belly Gang Kushington	TBA	TBA
September 18, 2025	Houston	United States	Cynthia Woods Mitchell Pavilion	Tyga, NoCap, Belly Gang Kushington	TBA	TBA
September 22, 2025	Oklahoma City	United States	Paycom Center	—N/a	TBA	TBA
September 24, 2025	Huntsville	United States	The Orion Amphitheater	Tyga, Belly Gang Kushington	TBA	TBA
September 25, 2025	Charlotte	United States	PNC Music Pavilion	Tyga, Belly Gang Kushington	TBA	TBA
September 28, 2025	Memphis	United States	FedExForum	—N/a	TBA	TBA
September 29, 2025	Atlanta	United States	State Farm Arena	Tyga, NoCap, Belly Gang Kushington	TBA	TBA
October 1, 2025	Orlando	United States	Kia Center	Tyga, NoCap, Belly Gang Kushington	TBA	TBA
October 2, 2025	West Palm Beach	United States	iTHINK Financial Amphitheatre	Tyga, NoCap, Belly Gang Kushington	TBA	TBA
October 29, 2025^{[b]}	Albuquerque	United States	Isleta Amphitheater	Tyga, Belly Gang Kushington	TBA	TBA

Date	City	Country	Venue	Supporting act(s)	Attendance	Revenue
2026
~~June 30~~^{[c]}	~~Bangor~~	United States	~~Maine Savings Amphitheater~~	2 Chainz	TBA	TBA
July 2	Saratoga Springs	United States	Saratoga Performing Arts Center	2 Chainz	TBA	TBA
July 3	Gilford	United States	BankNH Pavilion	2 Chainz	TBA	TBA
July 16	Des Moines	United States	Casey's Center	—N/a	TBA	TBA
July 17	Chicago	United States	Huntington Bank Pavilion	2 Chainz	TBA	TBA
July 18	Shakopee	United States	Mystic Lake Casino Hotel	2 Chainz	TBA	TBA
July 23	Columbus	United States	Nationwide Arena	2 Chainz	TBA	TBA
July 24	Clarkston	United States	Pine Knob Music Theatre	2 Chainz	TBA	TBA
July 25	Grand Rapids	United States	Acrisure Amphitheater	2 Chainz	TBA	TBA
July 28^{[c]}	Bangor	United States	Maine Savings Amphitheater	2 Chainz	TBA	TBA
July 30	Maryland Heights	United States	Hollywood Casino Amphitheatre	2 Chainz	TBA	TBA
July 31	Concord	United States	Toyota Pavilion at Concord	2 Chainz; The Game	TBA	TBA
August 1	Long Beach	United States	Long Beach Amphitheater	2 Chainz; The Game	TBA	TBA
August 14	Biloxi	United States	Mississippi Coast Coliseum	—N/a	TBA	TBA
August 15	Brandon	United States	Brandon Amphitheater	—N/a	TBA	TBA
August 16	Rogers	United States	Walmart Arkansas Music Pavilion	—N/a	TBA	TBA
August 27	Fort Worth	United States	Dickies Arena	2 Chainz	TBA	TBA
August 28	Fresno	United States	Save Mart Center	The Game	TBA	TBA
August 29	Denver	United States	The Junkyard	—N/a	TBA	TBA
September 10	Wantagh	United States	Northwell at Jones Beach Theater	2 Chainz	TBA	TBA
September 11	Camden	United States	Freedom Mortgage Pavilion	2 Chainz	TBA	TBA
September 18	State College	United States	Bryce Jordan Center	—N/a	TBA	TBA
September 19	Reading	United States	Santander Arena	—N/a	TBA	TBA
September 24	Greenville	United States	Bon Secours Wellness Arena	2 Chainz	TBA	TBA
September 25	Nashville	United States	Bridgestone Arena	2 Chainz	TBA	TBA
September 26	Raleigh	United States	CCU Music Park at Walnut Creek	2 Chainz	TBA	TBA
October 16	Charleston	United States	Charleston Coliseum & Convention Center	—N/a	TBA	TBA
October 17	San Antonio	United States	Frost Bank Center	—N/a	TBA	TBA
October 22	Lexington	United States	Rupp Arena	—N/a	TBA	TBA
October 23	Knoxville	United States	Food City Center	—N/a	TBA	TBA

Notes

- ^{^[a]} The Toronto concert was cancelled due to an unspecified illness.
- ^{^[b]} The Albuquerque concert was rescheduled from September 14 to October 29.
- ^{^[c]} The Bangor concert was rescheduled from June 30 to July 28 due to health issues.
