= Mirror (Lil Wayne song) =

2011 single by Lil Wayne featuring Bruno Mars

Single by Lil Wayne featuring Bruno Mars

from the album Tha Carter IV (deluxe edition)
- Released: September 13, 2011
- Studio: CMR South Studios (Miami, Florida)
- Genre: Hip hop; rap ballad
- Length: 3:48
- Label: Young Money; Cash Money; Universal Republic
- Songwriters: Dwayne Carter, Jr.; Peter Hernandez; Phillip Lawrence; Ramon Owen
- Producers: REO of the Soundkillers; The Smeezingtons (co.)

Lil Wayne singles chronology
"Y.U. Mad" (2011)	"Mirror" (2011)	"Strange Clouds" (2011)

Bruno Mars singles chronology
"Marry You" (2011)	"Mirror" (2011)	"It Will Rain" (2011)

Music video
- "Mirror" on YouTube

"Mirror" is a song by American rapper Lil Wayne featuring American singer-songwriter Bruno Mars. The second bonus track on the deluxe edition of Tha Carter IV (2011), was released to urban contemporary radio stations as the sixth and final single on September 13, 2011, through Young Money, Cash Money, and Universal Republic Records. The artists wrote the song alongside Phillip Lawrence and producer Ramon "REO" Owen of the Soundkillers, with co-production from the Smeezingtons. The song was produced three years before its release. Owen, with Mike Caren's help, was able to get the track to several rappers, who rejected it. Lil Wayne liked the song after hearing it, however, and his verses were added to Mars's hook vocals already on the track.

Music critics gave "Mirror" positive reviews praising it for Mars's smooth, epic hook and Wayne's introspective verses. The hip-hop and rap ballad has been compared in its composition to "Lighters" (2011) by Bad Meets Evil featuring Mars and lyrically to Wayne's single "How to Love" (2011) from the same album. Its lyrics describe the downfalls of life, as well as Wayne's upbringing, state of mind, past choices and personal life. "Mirror" debuted at number 16 on the Billboard Hot 100 and peaked in the top 20 of Belgium (Flanders) Denmark, Netherlands, Switzerland and the United Kingdom. It has been certified four times platinum by the Recording Industry Association of America (RIAA), double platinum by the Australian Recording Industry Association (ARIA) and Pro-Música Brasil (PMB).

Antoine Fuqua directed the accompanying music video, filmed in November 2011, with visual effects created by GloriaFX. It depicts Wayne throwing red, black and white paint on the walls of a room creating an undefined painting, while Mars sings on top of a ladder. The video ends with a scene showing a painting of Wayne, toned in red, crucified on a giant treble clef holding a mic in his left hand. Critics complimented its aesthetics. Wayne performed the song during his tour in Australia.

== Release and production ==
"Mirror" was released as the album's sixth and final single from the album Tha Carter IV (2011). Young Money, Cash Money and Universal Republic Records released the track to American urban contemporary radio stations on September 13, 2011. On November 1, 2011, the single was re-released in the same format and to rhythmic contemporary stations by Cash Money and Universal Republic Records. The song was made available in the United Kingdom via digital download on December 18, 2011. The track is featured on Wayne's first greatest hits album, I Am Music (2023), and Mars's first compilation album, Collaborations (2026).

Ramon "REO" Owen of the Soundkillers produced "Mirror" with co-production by the Smeezingtons. Dwayne Carter, Peter Hernandez, Philip Lawrence and Owen wrote the song. Michael "Banger" Cadahia and his assistant Edward "Jewfro" Lidow recorded it at CMR South Studios in Miami, Florida. The single was mixed at the Record Plant in Los Angeles by Fabian Marascuillo, with Ghazi Hourani as the mixing assistant. It was mastered by Brian "Big Bass" Gardner at Bernie Grundman Mastering.

== Background and lawsuit ==
Owen created the instrumental three years before its inclusion on Tha Carter IV. With the help of Atlantic Records A&R Mike Caren, Owen was able to get this recording, which already had Bruno Mars singing the hook, heard by industry "heavy-hitters" including rappers Kanye West, Drake, and Nas. The track was turned down a number of times until it reached Lil Wayne, who liked it and decided to keep it. Owen initially wanted the track to be a part of West's My Beautiful Dark Twisted Fantasy (2010); he "settle[d]" for it being included on Tha Carter IV. He considered its conclusion lucky, given the amount of material recorded during the time an album is produced. Owen claimed he alone produced the track with the Smeezingtons as co-writers; however, the CD's liner notes also credit the team as co-producers. Owen agreed that Wayne's verses captured the feeling of the song. The track leaked on August 25, 2011.

In 2014, Owen filed a lawsuit against Wayne alleging he had promised him at least $91,000 for his work. According to the lawsuit, Owen never received this payment. On February 19, 2015, Manhattan Federal Court judge, Katherine B. Forrest, order Wayne to pay Owen $100,000 and Young Money to provide their accounting records, as they failed to respond to the allegations in court, after being served with the legal documents in December 2014. During the judgment, Owen stated he tried to contact Wayne regarding the money for 11 months prior to the lawsuit. According to court filings, Owen is entitled to $91,841.50 in royalties.

== Composition ==
"Mirror"
In this sample, Wayne and Mars reflect on their struggles and upbringings.

"Mirror" is a hip-hop and rap ballad composed in the key of F Minor, set at a tempo of 80 beats per minute. The melody spans the tonal range of C4 to D♭5, while the music follows the chord progression of Fm-E♭-Cm–E♭–D♭. Its instrumental has been described as "an eerie wail in the background and a smothered kick-and snare-drum pattern". This is noticeable due to its tripped-down production and melancholy harmonies, echoing and somber beats. Rap-Up noticed the structure of "Mirror" resembles the one of "Lighters" (2011) by Bad Meets Evil, which also features Bruno Mars.

In the track, Mars shows his emo-angst by singing: "Through my rise and fall/ You've been my only friend" and Wayne gets "reflective" on his verses "Looking at me now I can see my past/Damn, I look just like my f—king dad/Light it up, that's smoke in mirrors/I even look good in the broken mirror." Wayne not only shows his "warped, troubled mind" but also his softer side by rapping about his father. Overall, Wayne reflects on his past choices and his life. Various publications affirmed that Lil Wayne took inspiration from Michael Jackson in one of his verses: "And no message any clearer, so I'm starting with the "Man in the Mirror" (1987). Idolator's Becky Bain found similarities between Wayne's single "How to Love" (2011) from the same album for its "introspective, sad and sweet" lyrics.

== Critical reception ==
The song received positive reviews from most music critics. Lewis Corner of Digital Spy gave the song four stars out of five. He found that "The final result is much like the heartthrob himself; love-torn, moody and destined to be popular." Billboard's Joe DeAndrea commented that the track was not only among Lil Wayne's best material, and found the vocals on the hook provided by Mars are quite "smooth". Another Billboard critic, Maria Sherman, praised Mars's hook, calling it "cinematic". Omar Burgess of HipHopDX praised Wayne for "pushing the envelope" describing "Mirror" as a concept track. Conversely, brookencool of Complex included the track on his list of The 10 Worst Lil Wayne Songs. He felt Wayne's and Mars's vocals sounded "forced and pieced together", and deemed the collaboration ineffective. Moreover, the critic found the song's reflective lyrics about Wayne's past and his mistakes shallow compared to Wayne's "All By Myself".

== Commercial performance ==
In the United States, "Mirror" debuted at its peak of number 16 on the Billboard Hot 100, and at number six on the Hot Digital Songs chart, with 149,000 copies sold in its first week. It coincided with the release of Wayne's album Tha Carter IV. The single peaked at numbers 22 and 25 on the Billboard Rhythmic Songs and Hot Rap Songs charts, respectively. The Recording Industry Association of America (RIAA) certified it four times platinum. "Mirror" peaked at number 46 on the Canadian Hot 100. In Australia, the song peaked at number 26, while it peaked at number 12 on the Australia Urban single charts. The Australian Recording Industry Association (ARIA) certified "Mirror" two times platinum with 140,000 copies.

In Europe, "Mirror" debuted at number 12 on the Danish charts, spending 10 weeks there. IFPI Denmark certified it twice Platinum due to its streaming numbers being equivalent to 200,000 copies and it was certified Gold for selling over 15,000 copies. The recording debuted at number 47 on February 18, 2012. It eventually reached its peak at number 11 on April 7, 2012. In the United Kingdom, the song debuted at 91 on the chart and peaked at number 17. It also peaked at number six on the UK Hip Hop and R&B Singles charts. The British Phonographic Industry (BPI) certified the song platinum. On the Dutch Top 40 charts, "Mirror" peaked at number 12. The song managed to peak at number 13 and 15 respectively in Slovakia and Switzerland.

== Music video ==
Filming for the music video took place in November 2011, directed by Antoine Fuqua. GloriaFX created the visual effects. The company was responsible for the painting and the appearance and disappearance effects among others. Vevo released a teaser of the music video on YouTube on January 27, 2012. The full-length video premiering on Vevo's official website on January 31, 2012.

The video begins with a shirtless Wayne standing in a room, while a camera shows various close-ups of his intricate tattoos. As the chorus begins, Wayne is shown painting the room red and black as Mars sings the chorus, while seated on the top of a ladder. Wayne is also shown throwing red paint on the wall to create an unformed picture. The rest of the video focuses on Wayne blasting red, black and white paint all over the room. It is finally revealed that the painting is of Wayne himself crucified on a treble clef holding a mic in his left hand. The rather convoluted background includes a face, clouds and lightning, all toned in magnificent red. Wayne and Mars stare at the masterpiece as the video comes to an end.

Gregory Adams of Exclaim! complimented Wayne's final painting and called the rapper's video a "bizarre art world exploration". Chris Coplan of Consequence of Sound said the final scene made the "Mona Lisa look like Dogs Playing Poker."

== Personnel ==
Credits adapted from the liner notes of Tha Carter IV (Deluxe Edition).

- Lil Wayne – lead vocals, songwriting
- Bruno Mars – lead vocals, songwriting
- Philip Lawrence – songwriting
- Ramon "REO" Owen of the Soundkillers – songwriting, production
- The Smeezingtons – co–production
- Fabian Marascuillo – mixing
- Ghazi Hourani – mixing assistant
- Michael "Banger" Cadahia – recording
- Edward "Jewfro" Lidow – recording assistant
- Brian "Big Bass" Gardner – mastering

== Charts ==
=== Weekly charts ===
List of chart positions
Chart (2011–2012)	Peak position
Australia (ARIA)	26
Australia (ARIA Urban)	12
Austria (Ö3 Austria Top 40)	32
Belgium (Ultratop 50 Flanders)	11
Belgium (Ultratop 50 Wallonia)	45
Canada Hot 100 (Billboard)	46
Denmark (Tracklisten)	12
France (SNEP)	22
Ireland (IRMA)	21
Italy (FIMI)	62
Netherlands (Dutch Top 40)	12
Netherlands (Single Top 100)	14
New Zealand (Recorded Music NZ)	37
Scottish Singles Sales (Official Charts)	43
Slovakia Airplay (ČNS IFPI)	13
Sweden (Sverigetopplistan)	36
Switzerland (Schweizer Hitparade)	15
UK Singles (Official Charts)	17
UK Hip Hop/R&B (Official Charts)	6
US Billboard Hot 100	16
US Hot Rap Songs (Billboard)	25
US Hot R&B/Hip-Hop Songs (Billboard)	69
US Rhythmic Airplay (Billboard)	22

=== Year-end charts ===
List of chart positions
Chart (2012)	Position
Belgium (Ultratop Flanders)	59
France (SNEP)	108
Netherlands (Dutch Top 40)	68
Netherlands (Single Top 100)	81
Sweden (Sverigetopplistan)	100
UK Singles (Official Charts Company)	133

== Certifications ==
List of certifications
Region	Certification	Certified units/sales
Australia (ARIA)	2× Platinum	140,000^{‡}
Brazil (Pro-Música Brasil)	2× Platinum	120,000^{‡}
Denmark (IFPI Danmark)	Gold	15,000^{^}
Germany (BVMI)	Gold	150,000^{‡}
New Zealand (RMNZ)	Platinum	30,000^{‡}
United Kingdom (BPI)	Platinum	600,000^{‡}
United States (RIAA)	4× Platinum	4,000,000^{‡}
Streaming
Denmark (IFPI Danmark)	2× Platinum	1,800,000^{†}
^{^} Shipments figures based on certification alone.^{‡} Sales+streaming figures based on certification alone.^{†} Streaming-only figures based on certification alone.

== Release history ==
List of release history, showing region(s), date(s), format(s) and label(s)
Region	Date	Format	Label	Ref.
United States	September 13, 2011	Urban contemporary radio	Young Money; Cash Money; Universal Republic	
United States	November 1, 2011	Rhythmic contemporary	Cash Money; Universal Republic	
United States	November 1, 2011	Urban contemporary radio	Cash Money; Universal Republic	
United Kingdom	December 18, 2011	Digital download	Unknown	

== See also ==
- Crucifixion in the arts
