= Fireman (song) =

Single by Lil Wayne

from the album Tha Carter II
- Released: October 25, 2005
- Recorded: 2005; Cash Money Studios (New Orleans, Louisiana); Circle House Studios (Miami, Florida)
- Genre: Hip-hop
- Length: 4:23
- Label: Cash Money; Universal
- Songwriters: Dwayne Carter; Bigram Zayas; Matthew DelGiorno
- Producer: Doe Boyz

Lil Wayne singles chronology
"Neck of the Woods" (2004)	"Fireman" (2005)	"Don't Trip" (2005)

Music video
- "Fireman" on YouTube

"Fireman" is a song by American rapper Lil Wayne, released on October 25, 2005, as the first single from his fifth studio album Tha Carter II. The single was produced by American production duo Doe Boyz, composed of Develop and Filthy.

== Charts ==
=== Weekly charts ===
Chart (2005–2006)	Peak position
US Billboard Hot 100	32
US Hot R&B/Hip-Hop Songs (Billboard)	15
US Hot Rap Songs (Billboard)	10
US Pop 100 (Billboard)	43
US Rhythmic Airplay (Billboard)	28

=== Year-end charts ===
Chart (2006)	Position
US Hot R&B/Hip-Hop Songs (Billboard)	82

== Certifications ==
Region	Certification	Certified units/sales
United States (RIAA)	2× Platinum	2,000,000^{‡}
United States (RIAA) Mastertone	Platinum	1,000,000^{*}
^{*} Sales figures based on certification alone.^{‡} Sales+streaming figures based on certification alone.
