= Blunt Blowin =

Promotional single by Lil Wayne

from the album Tha Carter IV
- Recorded: 2010
- Genre: Hip hop
- Length: 5:12
- Label: Young Money; Cash Money; Universal Republic
- Songwriter(s): Carter; Bigram Zayas; Matthew Arthur DelGiorno
- Producer(s): DVLP; Filthy (co.)

"Blunt Blowin" is a promotional single by American rapper Lil Wayne, from his ninth studio album, Tha Carter IV. Upon the release of Tha Carter IV it debuted at number 33 on the US Billboard Hot 100.

It was certified Gold by the RIAA on March 16, 2012, for selling 500,000 digital copies. It has since been certified 2× Platinum by the RIAA.

== Charts ==
Chart (2011)	Peak position
US Billboard Hot 100	33

== Certifications ==
Region	Certification	Certified units/sales
United States (RIAA)	2× Platinum	2,000,000^{‡}
^{‡} Sales+streaming figures based on certification alone.
