= It's Good =

Single by Lil Wayne featuring Jadakiss and Drake

from the album Tha Carter IV
- Released: September 13, 2011
- Recorded: 2011
- Genre: Hardcore hip hop; gangsta rap
- Length: 4:01
- Label: Young Money; Cash Money; Universal Republic
- Songwriters: Dwayne Carter; Aubrey Graham; Jason Phillips; Lyon; Valenzano; B. Pickens
- Producers: Young Ladd; Cool & Dre

Lil Wayne singles chronology
"She Will" (2011)	"It's Good" (2011)	"Y.U. Mad" (2011)

Drake singles chronology
"She Will" (2011)	"It's Good" (2011)	"Still Got It" (2011)

Jadakiss singles chronology
"It Ain't Over Til It's Over" (2011)	"It's Good" (2011)	"Pride N Joy" (2012)

"It's Good" is a song by American rapper Lil Wayne featuring fellow American rapper Jadakiss and Canadian rapper Drake. The fourteenth track off the former's Wayne's ninth studio album, Tha Carter IV. it was solicited to radio on September 13, 2011 as the album's fifth single.

== Critical reception ==
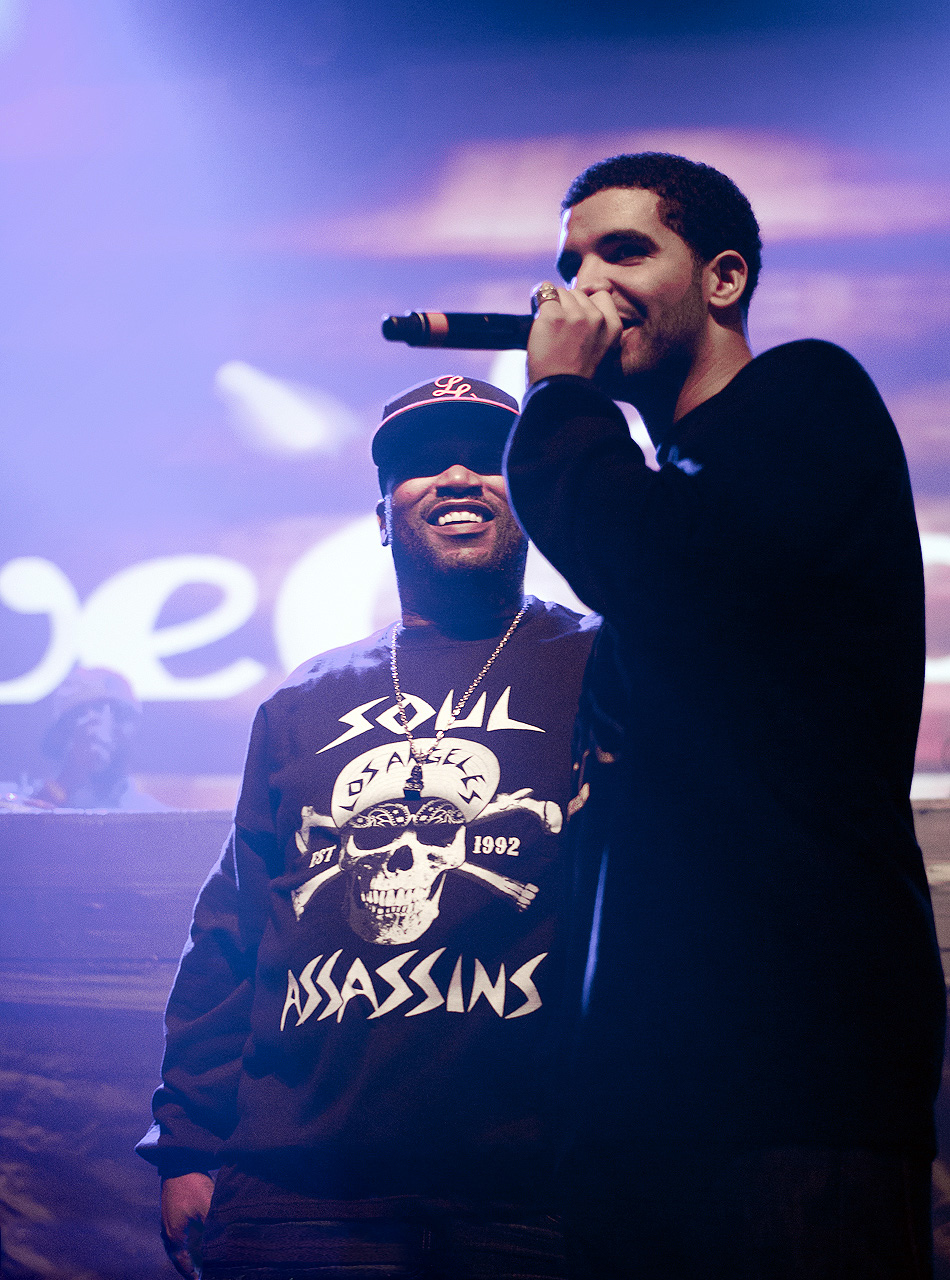
Drake was complimented by several sources for providing the best performance on the song.

Allmusic complimented "It's Good" and said it was a track to "marvel" at it also commented on the controversial lyrics by saying the track is "where a Jay-Z diss meets an Alan Parsons sample". Chicago Tribune reviewed Lil Wayne's part of the song saying "Next to Drake (and Jadakiss), Wayne just sounds petty. It’s a telling role reversal: once Wayne used to hop on other rappers’ tracks and blow them away. Now his guests magnify his lack of engagement." Pitchfork complimented Drake's verses by saying "And it's Drake who provides the record's most impassioned verse about his mentor's 2010 prison stint for criminal gun possession: "Rikers Island on this flow, eight months for that pistol/ But at least they had some bad bitches workin' in that shit hole."

== Controversy ==
"It's Good" gained considerable notice on various social networks because a portion of the song's lyrics performed by Lil Wayne in which he raps "I got your baby money / Kidnap your bitch, get that how much you love your lady money" which has been interpreted by various sources to be a response back at Jay-Z's verse on H.A.M. from Watch the Throne in which he raps "Really you got baby money ... You ain't got my lady's money." Kanye West played the track for Wayne but his response was "I wouldn’t ask him about a Jay-Z line because he’s not Jay-Z." Lil Wayne further elaborated on the alleged attack by saying "I know there won’t be any repercussions behind what I did. I know for a fact music is about perception. You can’t do anything but perceive what you hear. I know that for a fact. So I can’t ever be upset about someone’s reaction. I’m not going to say I don’t know what would happen before I even say [something on record]. I do know what will happen. I’m aware of it. But it is what it is." Jadakiss has distanced himself from all conflict as well and commented that he isn't involved on any attack on any rap artist. Slant commented on the alleged attack by saying that the track "generated more buzz than any other track on Tha Carter IV, not because it's especially good, but because Wayne appears to take some shots at Jay-Z, referencing an ongoing feud about who makes more money and maybe threatening to kidnap and ransom Beyoncé ("Kidnap your bitch/Get that 'How much you love your lady?' money").

== Chart performance ==
Chart (2011)	Peak position
U.S. Billboard Hot 100	79

== Release history ==
Country	Date	Format
United States	September 13, 2011	Urban radio
