= Hip-Hop (Lil Wayne and BigXthaPlug song) =

2025 song by Lil Wayne and BigXthaPlug featuring Jay Jones

Song by Lil Wayne and BigXthaPlug featuring Jay Jones

from the album Tha Carter VI
- Released: June 6, 2025
- Genre: Southern hip-hop
- Length: 4:01
- Label: Young Money; Republic
- Songwriters: Dwayne Carter; Xavier Landum; Ronald Jones; Marco Rodriguez-Diaz; Alexander Wu; Einer Bankz; Benjamin Diehl
- Producers: Infamous; Synco; Einer Bankz; Ben Billions

"Hip-Hop" is a song by American rappers Lil Wayne and BigXthaPlug featuring American rapper Jay Jones. It was released on June 6, 2025, from Wayne's fourteenth studio album, Tha Carter VI. It was produced by Infamous, Einer Bankz, Synco, and Ben Billions.

== Critical reception ==
Robin Murray of Clash considered "Hip-Hop" among the best songs from Tha Carter VI and wrote that it "stand[s] up with his finest work". Mosi Reeves of Rolling Stone remarked "It's fun to hear him chop up OG arcana while overdosing on basketball and football shout-outs. 'Weed smoke got me chokin' like Reggie Miller, nigga,' he raps on 'Hip-Hop.'" Paul Attard of Slant Magazine regarded the song as one of the album's "high points", which he also described as "little more than reminders of the baseline competence that Wayne was once capable of" and "offer scant evidence that he's still evolving as an artist".

== Charts ==
Chart performance for "Hip-Hop"
Chart (2025)	Peak position
New Zealand (Recorded Music NZ)	18
US Billboard Hot 100	36
US Hot R&B/Hip-Hop Songs (Billboard)	8
