= Tha Carter II =

Studio album by Lil Wayne
- Released: December 6, 2005
- Recorded: 2005
- Genres: Southern hip-hop; gangsta rap; R&B
- Length: 77:22
- Labels: Young Money; Cash Money; Universal
- Producers: Birdman (also exec.); the Runners; DJ Nasty & LVM; Robin Thicke; Young Yonny; the Heatmakerz; Cool & Dre; Deezle; Bigg D; DVLP; Filthy; T-Mix; Batman; Matlock

Lil Wayne chronology
The Dedication (2005)	Tha Carter II (2005)	Dedication 2 (2006)

Tha Carter albums chronology
Tha Carter (2004)	Tha Carter II (2005)	Tha Carter III (2008)

Singles from Tha Carter II
- 1. "Fireman" Released: October 25, 2005; 2. "Hustler Musik" Released: January 10, 2006; 3. "Shooter" Released: April 9, 2006

Tha Carter II is the fifth studio album by American rapper Lil Wayne. It was released on December 6, 2005, by Cash Money Records, Young Money Entertainment and Universal Records. The recording sessions took place from 2004 to 2005. The album was produced by Birdman, the Runners, and the Heatmakerz, among others. It serves as a sequel to his fourth album Tha Carter (2004), and was supported by three singles ("Fireman", "Hustler Musik" and "Shooter").

Tha Carter II received critical acclaim and ranks highly in retrospectives of Lil Wayne's best work. The album debuted at number two on the US Billboard 200 chart. The album was later certified double platinum by the Recording Industry Association of America (RIAA) in September 2020.

== Singles ==
The lead single from the album, called "Fireman" was released on October 25, 2005. The song was produced by DVLP and Filthy. While they were recording the song at the time, both DVLP and Filthy first burst into a music scene as the production duo, called Doe Boys.

The album's second single, "Hustler Musik" was released on January 10, 2006. The song was produced by T-Mix and the unknown producer named Batman. A music video was released for this song that was directed by Benny Boom.

The album's third single, "Shooter" was released on April 9, 2006. The song features guest vocals from an American R&B singer-songwriter Robin Thicke, who also produced this track. The song also was later included on Thicke's then-upcoming album, titled The Evolution of Robin Thicke (2006).

== Critical reception ==
Professional ratings
Review scores
Source	Rating
AllMusic	4.5/5 stars
Blender	4/5 stars
Entertainment Weekly	B
The Guardian	A
Houston Chronicle	3/5 stars
Pitchfork	8.1/10
PopMatters	8/10
Rolling Stone	3.5/5 stars
USA Today	3/4 stars
The Village Voice	B+

Upon its release, Tha Carter II received widespread acclaim from music critics, with several praising the lyricism and artistic growth demonstrated by Wayne on the album. AllMusic's David Jeffries praised the album's balance of "hookless, freestyle-ish tracks" and "slicker club singles", commenting that "the well-rounded, risk-taking, but true-to-its-roots album suggests he can weather the highs and lows like a champion." Entertainment Weekly's Ryan Dombal wrote that Tha Carter II "transcends [Wayne's] inflated ego" and complimented the album's "sturdy funk-blues tracks... that offer genuine value". David Drake of Stylus Magazine called the album "one of the year's best releases" and lauded his "entire persona, an aura, a rap creation that seems fully-developed and fascinating". Despite writing that "Wayne's verses need a good polish", Nick Sylvester of Pitchfork wrote that the album contains "jaw-droppers aplenty" and complimented Wayne's growth as a lyricist, stating:

People who met Wayne on "Go DJ" and thought him a lunchroom hack emcee – who knows what's happened since then, but damn has he learned how to write. His squeak is now a croak, his laugh a little more burly, his flow remarkably flexible. Sometimes he's deliberate like syrup cats ("But this is Southern, face it/ If we too simple then yall don't get the basics") but when he needs to be, he's nimble as that Other Carter: "I ain't talking too fast you just listening too slow." Remy and weed, fast things and women, the corner – these are Wayne's wax since B.G.'ing with B.G., putting piff on the campus before he ever enrolled in college.

IGN writer Jim During gave the album an eight out of ten and commented that Wayne "[punishes] the mic with hard-hitting verbal tenacity", and wrote that the album shows him "at his most focused, and is a strong next step for a relatively young career." Matt Cibula of PopMatters wrote ambivalently towards that album's production, writing that "the producers here are mostly no-namers who do their jobs well but not spectacularly", but praised Wayne's "amazing" words and remarked that "Straws really IS the best rapper alive, at least when he tries".

In 2020, Rolling Stone ranked it number 370 on the 500 Greatest Albums of All Time.

LA Weekly included the track "Best Rapper Alive" in their list of "Ten Rap-Rock Songs That Are Actually Awesome".

== Commercial performance ==
Tha Carter II debuted at number two on the US Billboard 200 chart, selling 240,000 copies in its first week. This became Wayne's fourth US top-ten debut. The album also debuted at number one on the US Top R&B/Hip-Hop Albums chart, becoming Wayne's third number-one album on this chart. As of March 2008, the album has sold 1.3 million copies in the US. On September 25, 2020, the album was certified double platinum by the Recording Industry Association of America (RIAA) for combined sales and album-equivalent units of over two million units in the United States.

== Track listing ==
No.	Title	Writer(s)	Producer(s)	Length
1.	"Tha Mobb"	Dwayne Carter, Jr.; Gregory Green; Sean Thomas; Wilson Turbinton	The Heatmakerz	5:20
2.	"Fly In"	Carter, Jr.; Tristan "T-Mix" Jones; Bryan Williams	T-Mix; Batman	2:23
3.	"Money on My Mind"	Carter, Jr.; Andrew Harr; Jermaine Jackson; Johnny Mollings; Lenny Mollings	The Runners; DJ Nasty & LVM	4:31
4.	"Fireman"	Carter, Jr.; Bigram Zayas; Matthew "Filthy" DelGiorno	DVLP; Filthy	4:23
5.	"Mo Fire"	Carter, Jr.; Ronald "Young Yonny" Ferebee, Jr.	Young Yonny	3:23
6.	"On tha Block #1"			0:38
7.	"Best Rapper Alive"	Carter, Jr.; Derrick Baker; Steve Harris	Bigg D	4:53
8.	"Lock and Load" (featuring Kurupt)	Carter, Jr.; Ricardo Brown; Jones; Williams	T-Mix; Batman	4:46
9.	"Oh No"	Carter, Jr.; Ferebee, Jr.; W. Matlock	Young Yonny; Matlock	3:11
10.	"Grown Man" (featuring Curren$y)	Carter, Jr.; Shante Franklin; Jones; Williams; Paul Harden	T-Mix; Batman	4:06
11.	"On tha Block #2"			0:26
12.	"Hit Em Up"	Carter, Jr.; Zayas; DelGiorno	DVLP; Filthy	4:07
13.	"Carter II"	Carter, Jr.; Jones; Williams	T-Mix; Batman	2:24
14.	"Hustler Musik"	Carter, Jr.; Jones; Williams	T-Mix; Batman	5:03
15.	"Receipt"	Carter, Jr.; Green; Thomas; O'Kelly Isley, Jr.; Ronald Isley	The Heatmakerz	3:48
16.	"Shooter" (featuring Robin Thicke)	Carter, Jr.; Robin Thicke; Robert Daniels; James Gass; Robert Keyes	Robin Thicke	4:35
17.	"Weezy Baby" (featuring Nikki Kynard)	Carter, Jr.; Nikki Kynard; Darius Harrison	Deezle	4:18
18.	"On tha Block #3"			0:13
19.	"I'm a D-Boy" (featuring Birdman)	Carter, Jr.; Williams; Jones; Eric Barrier; William Griffin, Jr.	T-Mix; Batman	4:00
20.	"Feel Me"	Carter, Jr.; Zayas; DelGiorno	DVLP; Filthy	3:48
21.	"Get Over" (featuring Nikki Kynard)	Carter, Jr.; Leary; Andre Lyon; Marcello Valenzano; Phill Hurtt; Walter Sigler	Cool & Dre	4:42
22.	"Fly Out"	Carter, Jr.; Jones; Williams	T-Mix; Batman	2:25
Total length:				77:22

Sample credits

- "Tha Mobb" samples "Moment from Truth", written and performed by Wilson Turbinton.
- "Best Rapper Alive" samples "Fear of the Dark", written by Steve Harris, and performed by Iron Maiden.
- "Grown Man" samples "Sparkle", written by Paul Harden, and performed by Cameo.
- "Receipt" samples "Lay-Away", written by O'Kelly Isley, Jr. and Ronald Isley, and performed by the Isley Brothers.
- "Shooter" samples "Oh Shooter", written and performed by Robin Thicke, also written by Robert Daniels, James Gass and Robert Keyes; as well as Wayne's "Shooter" or Thicke's "Oh Shooter", also it contains the interpolation from "Mass Appeal" performed by Gang Starr.
- "I'm a D-Boy" samples "Paid in Full", written and performed by Eric Barrier and William Griffin, Jr.
- "Get Over" samples "Love Is What We Came Here For", written by Phill Hurtt and Walter Sigler, and performed by Garland Green.

== Personnel ==
Credits for Tha Carter II adapted from AllMusic.

- Birdman – producer
- Derrick "Bigg D" Baker – composer, producer
- Katina Bynum – project manager
- D.P. "Dad" Carter – composer
- Dwayne "Lil Wayne" Carter – composer, vocals
- Cool & Dre – multi instruments, producers
- Andrews Correa – audio engineer
- Shante "Curren$y" Franklin – composer
- April DeVona – assistant engineer
- Brian "Big Bass" Gardner – mastering
- Gregory Green – composer
- The Heatmakerz – producers
- David Karmiol – bass guitar
- Lil' Hollywood – engineer
- Patrick Magee – assistant engineer
- Jonathan Mannion – photography
- Tommy Mara – assistant engineer
- Fabian Marasciullo – audio engineer, engineer, mixing
- Kevin Mayer – assistant engineer
- Nikki – vocals
- Danielle Premone – assistant engineer
- Jose Luis Rodríguez – assistant engineer
- Walter "Bunny" Sigler – composer
- Tristan "T-Mix" Jones – producer
- Sean Thomas – composer
- Javier Valverde – engineer
- Ronald "Slim" Williams – executive producer
- Bryan "Baby" Williams – executive producer
- Genevieve Zaragoza – A&R

== Charts ==
=== Weekly charts ===
Chart (2005–2006)	Peak position
US Billboard 200	2
US Top R&B/Hip-Hop Albums (Billboard)	1
US Top Rap Albums (Billboard)	1

=== Year-end charts ===
Chart (2006)	Position
US Billboard 200	47
US Top R&B/Hip-Hop Albums (Billboard)	6
US Top Rap Albums (Billboard)	2

== Certifications ==
Region	Certification	Certified units/sales
United States (RIAA)	2× Platinum	2,000,000^{‡}
^{‡} Sales+streaming figures based on certification alone.
