= Hustler Musik =

Single by Lil Wayne

from the album Tha Carter II
- Released: January 10, 2006
- Recorded: 2005
- Genre: Hip hop
- Length: 5:02
- Label: Cash Money; Universal
- Songwriters: Carter, Jr.; Jones; Williams
- Producer: TMIX

Lil Wayne singles chronology
"Don't Trip" (2005)	"Hustler Musik" (2006)	"Holla at Me" (2006)

"Hustler Musik" is the second single from Lil Wayne's 2005 album Tha Carter II. Although popular, it failed to live up on the Billboard chart to other singles put out by Lil Wayne. The song received airplay on East Coast radio stations and moderate airplay elsewhere, and a music video was also shot for it which also received moderate airplay. Lil Wayne has stated that this was one of his favorite songs he ever recorded. A remix was made sampling Anita Baker's "Mystery".

== Music video ==
The music video was shot in New York City by Benny Boom. The music video features a colored "Hustler Musik" for the first half, and features the hook and first verse to the song "Money on My Mind" (also featured on his album Tha Carter II) in which the video changes scenes and is portrayed in black and white.

== Charts ==
Chart (2006)	Peak position
US Billboard Hot 100	87
US Hot R&B/Hip-Hop Songs (Billboard)	26
US Hot Rap Songs (Billboard)	16

== Certifications ==
Region	Certification	Certified units/sales
United States (RIAA)	Platinum	1,000,000^{‡}
United States (RIAA) Mastertone	Platinum	1,000,000^{*}
^{*} Sales figures based on certification alone.^{‡} Sales+streaming figures based on certification alone.

== Release history ==
Region	Date	Format(s)	Label(s)	Ref.
United States	January 31, 2006	Rhythmic contemporary radio	Cash Money, Universal	
