= She Will =

2011 single by Lil Wayne

Single by Lil Wayne featuring Drake

from the album Tha Carter IV
- Released: August 16, 2011
- Recorded: 2011
- Genre: Hip hop; downtempo
- Length: 5:07
- Label: Young Money; Cash Money; Universal Republic
- Songwriters: Dwayne Carter; Aubrey Graham; Tyler Williams
- Producer: T-Minus • 40

Lil Wayne singles chronology
"How to Love" (2011)	"She Will" (2011)	"It's Good" (2011)

Drake singles chronology
"Headlines" (2011)	"She Will" (2011)	"It's Good" (2011)

"She Will" is a song by American rapper Lil Wayne, featuring Canadian rapper Drake. It was written alongside producers T-Minus & 40, it was released on August 16, 2011 as the fourth single from the former's ninth studio album Tha Carter IV. It was certified quadruple platinum by the Recording Industry Association of America for sales exceeding 4 million units on September 27, 2022.

In 2025 the song resurfaced and went viral due to it being associated with a TikTok dance trend, leading to a resurgence of streams of the song on Spotify.

== Background ==
On August 7, 2011, a video of a recording session of the song was released with Lil Wayne previewing his verse to Drake on Skype. It was directed by DJ Scoob Doo, and was showcased on MTV News. The song was to be titled "Maybe She Will", to be recorded by Drake and to feature a verse from Rick Ross, but after hearing the song, Drake asked Lil Wayne to have it.

== Chart performance ==
On August 18, 2011, it debuted on the US Billboard Hot R&B/Hip-Hop Songs chart at number 48 and eventually ascended to number 1. In its first week, it sold 255,000 digital copies, debuting at number 3 on the Billboard Hot 100. This made it the highest-charting single from the album as well as Wayne's third highest-charting song as a lead artist, behind "Mona Lisa", "Don't Cry", "How to Love", "Lollipop" and "A Milli". The song also topped the Digital Songs chart on the week of September 3, reaching 255,000 digital sales.

== Charts ==
=== Weekly charts ===
Chart (2011)	Peak position
Canada Hot 100 (Billboard)	16
France (SNEP)	70
Scottish Singles Sales (Official Charts)	75
UK Hip Hop/R&B (Official Charts)	19
UK Singles (Official Charts Company)	58
US Billboard Hot 100	3
US Hot R&B/Hip-Hop Songs (Billboard)	1
US Hot Rap Songs (Billboard)	2
US Rhythmic Airplay (Billboard)	3

Chart (2025)	Peak position
Australia (ARIA)	78
Australia Hip Hop/R&B (ARIA)	14
Global 200 (Billboard)	160
Greece International (IFPI)	58
Lithuania (AGATA)	95

=== Year-end charts ===
Chart (2011)	Position
US Billboard Hot 100	95
US Hot R&B/Hip-Hop Songs (Billboard)	34
US Rap Songs (Billboard)	18
US Rhythmic (Billboard)	40

== Certifications ==
Region	Certification	Certified units/sales
Denmark (IFPI Danmark)	Gold	45,000^{‡}
United Kingdom (BPI)	Gold	400,000^{‡}
United States (RIAA)	4× Platinum	4,000,000^{‡}
^{‡} Sales+streaming figures based on certification alone.

== Release history ==
Region	Date	Format
United States		
United States	August 16, 2011	Digital download
United States	August 16, 2011	Rhythmic contemporary airplay
