= How to Love =

Single by Lil Wayne

from the album Tha Carter IV
- Released: May 26, 2011
- Recorded: 2011
- Genre: Hip hop soul; R&B; progressive rap
- Length: 4:00
- Label: Young Money; Cash Money; Universal Republic
- Songwriters: Dwayne Carter, Jr.; Marcus Boyd; LaMar Seymour; LaNelle Seymour; Jermaine Preyan; Noel Fisher
- Producers: Drum Up; Detail

Lil Wayne singles chronology
"I'm on One" (2011)	"How to Love" (2011)	"She Will" (2011)

Music video
- "How to Love" on YouTube

"How to Love" is a song by American rapper Lil Wayne, released as the third single from his ninth studio album, Tha Carter IV. The song features production from Drum Up (LaMar Seymour, LaNelle Seymour) for Drum Up Digital with Noel "Detail" Fisher and was released as a digital download on June 13, 2011. It was later released to urban contemporary radio stations on June 24, 2011. The song also makes it his first entry on hot adult contemporary stations, as CJFM-FM Montreal began playing it a month later after the single's release. It peaked at number 5 on the Billboard Hot 100, making it his third highest peak on the chart as the primary artist. Lil Wayne performed the song at the 2011 MTV Video Music Awards, and it received a nomination for "Best Video with a Message" at the 2012 MTV Video Music Awards.

== Content and composition ==
The song features a slow, "stripped down" production from Drum Up (LaMar Seymour, LaNelle Seymour) for Drum Up Digital with Noel "Detail" Fisher based largely around the sounds of an acoustic guitar and drums. Wayne has said the song is about women who "don't know how to love because there's deep reasons for them not knowing how to love...And what I mean by deep reasons is deep and dark reasons." Furthermore, Wayne stated regarding the track that "A lot of people don't open up that can and I figured that I can open up that can of worms and see what happens."

Lil Wayne also revealed that for the acoustic-driven How To Love, he pulled inspiration from late rapper Tupac Shakur’s inspirational 1993 hit, "Keep Ya Head Up" and said “That song is just sweeping the world. It’s touching every woman, that’s what it was for,” he said. “It was like Tupac had ‘Keep Ya Head Up’ and it was a message to women and little girls across the world just to keep your head up even though things are hard. The song is written in the key of B major, with a tempo of 72 beats per minute, the chord progression is B–Bmaj7–Emaj7–Em.

== Music video ==
The music video premiered August 23, 2011 on MTV Jams as "Jam of the Week." In an interview with MTV News, Detail revealed that the video had been written entirely by Wayne himself, and felt that the video would "have a big, big effect, and it's going to shock you because [of] the perspective you might look at it as". He also felt that the video "crosses rap's boundaries" with the song's unusual style, and also stated that "after he showed me the video concept, it's like, 'Yo, dude, we're gonna be at the Country Awards with this record,'... we gonna be sitting next to Taylor Swift." It is also directed by Chris Robinson and stars Chanta Patton. Darris Love, Birdman and Tristan Wilds make a cameo appearance. On August 24 the music video for "How To Love" was added on Lil Wayne's VEVO channel.

The video first shows a young woman deciding to not get an abortion and running out of the hospital. Her child is born a girl and lives through tough times with her single mother, due to her physically abusive, wife-beating father being in jail. When the girl is an adolescent, her mother's boyfriend molests her. When she becomes a teenager, she is promiscuous. When she became an adult, she has two children and soon becomes a stripper. A customer from the strip club pays her to have sex with him and she is diagnosed with HIV. She runs out of the hospital, like her mother at the beginning of the video. The music video then rewinds and shows a different life that the girl could have lived. Her mother would move into her own mother's house and even marry a better man, with her little daughter as flower girl with a clear view of a healthy, respectful, and loving marriage. In the end, the daughter grows up to be smarter and more mature, and graduates from high school, making her mother and grandmother proud. When she becomes an adult, she is in the same hospital again awaiting a test result. The doctor tells her she is pregnant, and she is happy and hugs her mother, thanking her for teaching her "how to love."

== Critical reception ==
"How to Love" received widespread acclaim from critics, complimenting the low tone and deep and mellow meaning in the song's lyrics. Critics additionally commended Wayne for his experimentation with his own style. Amanda Hensel of PopCrush lauded the "new side" displayed by Lil Wayne in the song, stating "we haven’t heard Young Weezy like this before, but if [it] is a result of his new lady friend, we welcome it with open arms. Not that we want the rap master to go all singer-songwriter on us, but this gem shows that even the hardest of exteriors can have a gooey center." It also reached #1 in the Rhythmic Top 40 and two weeks later it returned to that spot.

== Covers ==
The song has been covered by Reina Williams, Demi Lovato, K. Michelle, Justin Bieber, PJ Morton, Tinashe, August Alsina, Christina Grimmie, Jes Hudak, Tae Brooks, Cimorelli, Jude Demorest, Mark Isaiah, and Telamor. There is also a remix featuring Enrique Iglesias.

== Track listing ==
Digital single

No.	Title	Writer(s)	Producer(s)	Length
1.	"How to Love"	Dwayne Carter, Jr., Noel "Detail" Fisher, LaMar Seymour, LaNelle Seymour, Jermaine Preyan	Drum Up, Noel "Detail" Fisher	4:00

== Charts ==
=== Weekly charts ===
Chart (2011)	Peak position
Australia (ARIA)	76
Belgium (Ultratip Bubbling Under Flanders)	27
Canada Hot 100 (Billboard)	20
France (SNEP)	97
New Zealand (Recorded Music NZ)	24
Scotland Singles (Official Charts)	60
Switzerland (Schweizer Hitparade)	67
UK Singles (Official Charts)	48
UK Hip Hop/R&B (Official Charts)	10
US Billboard Hot 100	5
US Hot R&B/Hip-Hop Songs (Billboard)	2
US Hot Rap Songs (Billboard)	2
US Pop Airplay (Billboard)	9
US Rhythmic Airplay (Billboard)	1

=== Year-end charts ===
Annual chart rankings
Chart (2011)	Position
US Billboard Hot 100	23
US Hot R&B/Hip-Hop Songs (Billboard)	15
US Mainstream Top 40 (Billboard)	43
US Rhythmic (Billboard)	4

Chart (2012)	Position
US Ringtones (Billboard)	17

== Certifications ==
Region	Certification	Certified units/sales
Australia (ARIA)	Platinum	70,000^{‡}
United Kingdom (BPI)	Silver	200,000^{‡}
United States (RIAA)	6× Platinum	6,000,000^{‡}
^{‡} Sales+streaming figures based on certification alone.

== Release history ==
Country	Date	Format	Label
United States	May 26, 2011	Digital download	Young Money, Cash Money, Universal Republic
United States	May 31, 2011	Urban contemporary airplay	Young Money, Cash Money, Universal Republic
United Kingdom	June 3, 2011	Digital download	Young Money, Cash Money, Universal Republic
Germany	June 3, 2011	Digital download	Young Money, Cash Money, Universal Republic
