= Octet (film) =

- Directed by: Lin-Manuel Miranda
- Written by: Dave Malloy
- Based on: Octet by Dave Malloy
- Produced by: Dave Malloy; Julie Oh; John Skidmore; Luis A. Miranda, Jr.
- Starring: Amanda Seyfried; Rachel Zegler; Sheryl Lee Ralph; Phillipa Soo; Gaten Matarazzo; Jonathan Groff; Tramell Tillman; Paul-Jordan Jansen
- Cinematography: Laura Merians Goncalves
- Edited by: Jonah Moran
- Music by: Dave Malloy
- Production companies: 5000 Broadway Productions; Best Kept Secret Productions
- Country: United States
- Language: English

Octet is an upcoming American musical film directed by Lin-Manuel Miranda as his second feature. Written by Dave Malloy, it is an adaptation of the stage musical Octet. The film will star Amanda Seyfried, Rachel Zegler, Sheryl Lee Ralph, Phillipa Soo, Gaten Matarazzo, Jonathan Groff, Tramell Tillman, and Paul-Jordan Jansen.

== Premise ==
"Eight internet-obsessed people meet in a church basement and lock their phones in a box. The musical follows the octet as they struggle with digital dependency, charting their compulsions using only the analog vibrancy of their own voices."

== Cast ==
- Amanda Seyfried as Jessica
- Rachel Zegler as Velma
- Sheryl Lee Ralph as Paula
- Phillipa Soo as Karly
- Gaten Matarazzo as Toby
- Jonathan Groff as Henry
- Tramell Tillman as Marvin
- Paul-Jordan Jansen as Ed

== Production ==
Producers Julie Oh of Lin-Manuel Miranda's production company 5000 Broadway Productions, Josh Skidmore of Best Kept Secret Productions, and Luis Miranda, Jr., president of 5000 Broadway Productions, announced in April 2026 that Lin Manuel-Miranda would direct a film adaptation of Octet, a musical that debuted off-Broadway at Signature Theatre in 2019, composed and written by Dave Malloy, which won the 2020 Lucille Lortel Award for Outstanding Musical, among other theatre awards. Malloy had invited Miranda and his wife Vanessa Nadal to see Octet, and to Miranda's surprise, Nadal enjoyed it despite not being a fan of musicals. Miranda pursued the project as a feature film, which would be his second directorial effort after Tick, Tick... Boom! (2021).

Malloy would adapt his own book for the screen and serve as an executive producer. Other executive producers of the film include Johnny Holland, Owen Panettieri, and Diana DiMenna. The film is being financed and executive produced by Sander Jacobs, Caren Jacobs, TodayTix Group, Jeffrey Seller, Teresa Tsai, and John Gore for Broadway.com.

Miranda announced the cast, and that rehearsals had begun, on April 14, 2026. Filming took place in Yonkers, New York. Filming wrapped on June 12 after a 22-day shoot.

=== Casting ===
Miranda worked with his longtime casting director Bernie Telsey for the ensemble. Rachel Zegler and Amanda Seyfried were cast as the film's sopranos, Velma and Jessica, while Phillipa Soo and Sheryl Lee Ralph portray altos Karly and Paula. Jonathan Groff and Gaten Matarazzo play tenors Henry and Toby, and Tramell Tillman and Paul-Jordan Jansen were also included as the film's bass voices, Marvin and Ed. Zegler reached out to Miranda after hearing about the project, while Seyfried was cast after Miranda watched her cover of Joni Mitchell's "California" during her appearance at The Tonight Show Starring Jimmy Fallon. Matarazzo and Jansen were recruited by Miranda after seeing them as part of the cast in a Broadway revival of Sweeney Todd. Despite having not seen Tillman's television series Severance, Miranda saw a clip of the show featuring Tillman's character Seth Milchick dancing with a marching band, and knew that he "was musical."
