= Manhattan Times =

- "Uptown's newspaper since 2000"
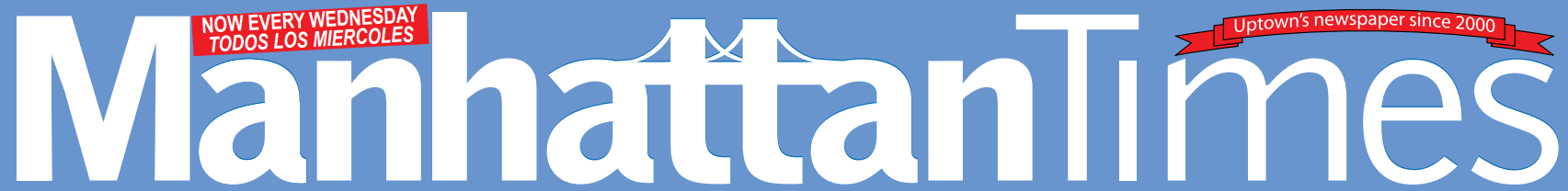
- Type: Weekly newspaper
- Format: Paper and digital
- Founder(s): Luís A. Miranda Jr., Roberto Ramírez Sr., and David Keisman
- Editor: Debralee Santos
- General manager: Jennifer Saldaña
- Staff writers: Adrian Cabreja, Verónica Cruz, Erik Febrillet, Gregg McQueen, Yamilla Miranda, and Ramon Peralta
- Founded: 2000; 26 years ago
- Language: English / Spanish
- City: New York City
- Country: United States
- ISSN: 1941-9015
- Website: www.manhattantimesnews.com

The Manhattan Times is a free English / Spanish bilingual community newspaper serving all the neighborhoods of Upper Manhattan, including Hamilton Heights, East, Central, and West Harlem, Washington Heights, Inwood, and Marble Hill. It was founded in 2000 by Luís A. Miranda Jr., Roberto Ramírez Sr., and David Keisman. The print version is distributed free on Wednesdays to 235 different street boxes and community organizations (as of March 2020), primarily in Washington Heights and Inwood.

== Content ==
The primary feature of the Manhattan Times is its articles, written by a combination of editorial staff and others, primarily on topics of interest to residents of Northern Manhattan and New York City as a whole. Each article is published in both English and Spanish, with the goal of accessibility for readers, as Spanish is the language most commonly spoken in Washington Heights and Inwood households.

In addition to articles, the newspaper has many elements included in every paper such as classifieds listing job opportunities and sales offers. It also has a regular page promoting local restaurants of Washington Heights and Inwood. Advertising, the paper's primary source of revenue, is taken up substantially by PSAs from the New York City government and advertisements for local businesses. The paper also regularly lists local events in the Northern Manhattan area.

== History ==
Manhattan Times was founded by Luís A. Miranda Jr., Roberto Ramírez Sr., and David Keisman, although as of March 2020 the paper leaves Keisman, the former publisher of a Queens newspaper, out of the "founder / publisher" title. Luís A. Miranda Jr., father of Lin-Manuel Miranda, had grown up in a politically active family in Puerto Rico, and learned to appreciate journalism reading the socialist newspaper Claridad. He and Ramírez were experienced in politics, being partners of the political consulting firm MirRam Group LLC.

Robert W. Snyder's book Crossing Broadway, an analysis of the history of Washington Heights, describes the role of the Manhattan Times in bridging the White and Latino communities of Washington Heights. The paper has both advertised the neighborhood's real estate, which is becoming more and more in demand due to rising gentrification, and advocated for tenant's rights and other issues impacting the neighborhood's established residents. Manhattan Times has been successful as a free newspaper, he argued, because it drew advertisers and readership from the English-speaking and Spanish-speaking communities of Northern Manhattan.

A sister newspaper, The Bronx Free Press, is published in The Bronx.
