= Kuhoo Verma =

American actor and singer

Kuhoo Verma (/ˈkuhu/ KOO-hoo) is an American actor and singer. She played Velma in the 2019 musical Octet, winning the Lucille Lortel Award for Outstanding Featured Actress in a Musical. In 2021, she starred as Sunny in the Hulu comedy Plan B.

== Early life and education ==
Verma is an alumnus of North Penn High School in Pennsylvania. She attended New York University, where she obtained a vocal performance degree with a focus in opera.

== Career ==
Verma's first on-screen role came in 2017's The Big Sick, playing a prospective bride for Kumail (Kumail Nanjiani). In 2021, she starred in the coming-of-age comedy Plan B as a high school student in search of the morning-after pill following a regrettable sexual encounter. She appeared alongside Adam Sandler and Jennifer Aniston in 2023's Murder Mystery 2, playing the sister of the Maharajah. In 2025, she was announced as the lead of Jackrabbit, a "mystery-comedy-thriller" about an investigative reporter.

On stage, she has also appeared in several musicals. For her role as a member of an internet addiction support group in Dave Malloy's Octet, Verma won the 2020 Lucille Lortel Award for Outstanding Featured Actress in a Musical, as well as a Drama Desk Ensemble Award. In December 2025, Verma took over the role of Veronica Sawyer in the Off-Broadway revival of Heathers: The Musical. In May 2026, Verma premiered the role of Ila in The Lunchbox at Berkeley Repertory Theatre.

== Acting credits ==
=== Film ===
Year	Title	Role	Notes
2017	The Big Sick	Zubeida	
2021	Plan B	Sunny	
2023	Murder Mystery 2	Saira	
2024	Space Cadet	Violet Marie Vislawski	
2027	Jackrabbit	George	

=== Stage ===
Year	Title	Role	Venue	Notes
2017	Monsoon Wedding	Aditi	Berkeley Repertory Theatre	
2019	Octet	Velma	Signature Theatre Company	
2021	Fairycakes	Performer	Greenwich House Theater	
2022	Octet	Velma	Berkeley Repertory Theatre	
2024–2025	A Funny Thing Happened on the Way to the Forum	Philia	Signature Theatre	
2025	Nobody Loves You	Jenny	American Conservatory Theater	
2025-2026	Heathers: The Musical	Veronica Sawyer	New World Stages	
2026	The Lunchbox	Ila	Berkeley Repertory Theatre	

=== Awards and nominations ===
Award	Year	Category	Work	Result	Notes
Drama Desk Awards	2020	Ensemble Award	Octet	Won	
Lucille Lortel Awards	2020	Outstanding Featured Actress in a Musical	Octet	Won	
