= Peanuts 2 N Elephant =

2025 song by Lil Wayne

Song by Lil Wayne

from the album Tha Carter VI
- Released: June 6, 2025
- Genre: Comedy hip hop
- Length: 3:12
- Label: Young Money; Republic
- Songwriters: Dwayne Carter; Lin-Manuel Miranda
- Producer: Lin-Manuel Miranda

"Peanuts 2 N Elephant" (uploaded to YouTube officially as "Peanuts 2 N Elephants") is a song by American rapper Lil Wayne. Written by Wayne and producer Lin-Manuel Miranda, the song was released on June 6, 2025 as the thirteenth song on his fourteenth solo studio album Tha Carter VI.

Upon the album's release, the song received widespread mockery, with the majority of criticism going to Miranda's instrumental; various critics listed it as one of the worst songs on the album. Despite its negative reception, the song charted at number 34 on the US Billboard Hot R&B/Hip-Hop Songs chart.

== Composition ==
"Peanuts 2 N Elephant" runs at a length of three minutes and twelve seconds, with a tempo of 90 beats per minute. Miranda's instrumental, which includes multiple elephant samples, was widely noted; multiple publications compared it to a circus, as well as various video games including Frogger, Crash Bandicoot, and soundtracks of Game Boy and Super Nintendo Entertainment System games, (Note: Attributed to multiple references.) with reviewer Anthony Fantano further writing that the song would be what would happen "if you could 16 bit-ify that piece of music that plays in Looney Toons [sic] when something's happening in a factory". Stereogum described the song as "utterly berserk", while Live for Live Music compared the song to a track from Wayne's 2003 mixtape Da Drought, stating that it "allows wordsmith Wayne to get imaginative cadences and imagery on his verses".

== Critical reception ==
"Peanuts 2 N Elephant" was widely criticized upon its release, generally being singled out as the worst song on Tha Carter VI due to its production. Michael Saponara of Billboard gave the song his second-lowest track ranking for the album, only topping the spoken word intro "King Carter", saying that "Out of all the fire production at [Wayne's] disposal, this circus beat should have been passed on". Mosi Reeves of Rolling Stone also criticized the song in his review, referring to Miranda's instrumental as "clumsily amateurish" and alleging that it "personifies the celebrity BFF phenomenon at its worst", while Stereoboard additionally criticized Wayne's "lazy and lacklustre rapping". In a dedicated article for USA Today, Cory Woodroof panned the song as "a terrible decision made between two very talented people who know better" and an "all-time 'immediate album skip'", writing "Lil Wayne's cringey bars on this song already clang about without any wit or passion, and there is already nothing you can do to salvage those lyrics with that Greatest Showman Super Nintendo game beat playing in the background", additionally noting other poorly received Miranda compositions such as "The Scuttlebutt" from the 2023 remake of The Little Mermaid.

However, in more positive reflections, Andrew King of TheGamer called the song one of his favorites from the album, writing that "[Wayne's] spitting like his life depends on it, but on a track that sounds more like he's parked in front of the PS1." Similarly, reviewer Anthony Fantano listed the song as the sole "best" song on the album and stated that "this reminds me of an older version of Wayne when he was out here proving that 'I'm a rapper who can rap on anything, who will rap on anything. No matter what the instrumental is, I will sound entertaining, I will sound confident, I will sound out of my mind'", although he conceded that "I feel like the context in which this song would work best is surrounded by a bunch of incredible tracks and bangers and some of Wayne's best material to date. ... But instead, what you have here with this track is one goofy ass moment standing among all of these just completely awful, awful cuts."

== Charts ==
Chart performance for "Peanuts 2 N Elephant"
Chart (2025)	Peak position
US Hot R&B/Hip-Hop Songs (Billboard)	34
