= Lin-Manuel Miranda =

American songwriter, actor, filmmaker and librettist (born 1980)

- Miranda in 2026
- Born: January 16, 1980 (age 46); New York City, U.S.
- Education: Wesleyan University (BA)
- Occupations: Songwriter; actor; filmmaker; librettist; singer; rapper
- Years active: 2002–present
- Spouse: Vanessa Nadal (m. 2010)
- Children: 2
- Parents: Luis A. Miranda Jr. (father); Luz Towns-Miranda (mother)
- Relatives: José Miranda (cousin); Eduardo Cabra (cousin); Residente (cousin)
- Awards: Full list
- Website: linmanuel.com

Lin-Manuel Miranda (/mænˈwɛl/ man-WELL; born January 16, 1980) is an American songwriter, actor, filmmaker, librettist, and producer. He created the Broadway musicals In the Heights and Hamilton, and the soundtracks for the animated films Moana, Vivo, and Encanto. He has received numerous accolades including a Pulitzer Prize for Drama, three Tony Awards, two Laurence Olivier Awards, two Emmy Awards, and five Grammy Awards, along with nominations for two Academy Awards. He received the Kennedy Center Honor in 2018.

Miranda made his Broadway debut in 2008, writing the music and lyrics for and starring in the musical In the Heights, which won the Tony Award for Best Musical and Best Original Score and the Grammy Award for Best Musical Theater Album. It was later adapted as a 2021 film of the same name. Miranda returned to Broadway in 2015, writing the script, music, and lyrics, as well as starring in the musical Hamilton, which was praised by critics and became a popular culture phenomenon. Hamilton won the Pulitzer Prize and was nominated for a record 16 Tonys and won 11, including Miranda's first win for the Best Book of a Musical. The Hamilton cast recording spent 10 weeks atop Billboard's Top Rap Albums chart and became the eleventh-biggest album of the 2010s.

A frequent collaborator of the Walt Disney Company, Miranda has written original songs for the studio. He gained two Oscar nominations for "How Far I'll Go" and "Dos Oruguitas" from Moana and Encanto, respectively. The song "We Don't Talk About Bruno" from Encanto broke various records and marked Miranda's first number-one song on the US Billboard Hot 100 and the UK Singles charts. He starred as Jack in the musical fantasy Mary Poppins Returns (2018), for which he was nominated for a Golden Globe. For his performance in the Disney+ live stage recording of Hamilton released in 2020, he received a Golden Globe and Primetime Emmy nomination. Miranda debuted as a film director with Tick, Tick... Boom!.

His television work includes recurring roles on The Electric Company (2009–2010) and His Dark Materials (2019–2022). Miranda received Primetime Emmy Award-nominations for hosting Saturday Night Live in 2016, and guest starring in Curb Your Enthusiasm in 2018. He has been politically active on behalf of Puerto Rico. Miranda met with politicians in 2016 to speak out in favor of debt relief for Puerto Rico and raised funds for rescue efforts and disaster relief after Hurricane Maria in 2017.

== Early life and education ==
Miranda was born on January 16, 1980, in New York City to Luz Towns-Miranda, a clinical psychologist, and Luis Miranda Jr., a political consultant. He is of predominantly Puerto Rican descent and also has distant Mexican, English, and African American ancestry. His parents named him "Lin-Manuel" after a poem about the Vietnam War by Puerto Rican writer José Manuel Torres Santiago entitled "Nana roja para mi hijo Lin Manuel" ("Red Lullaby for My Son Lin Manuel"). Miranda grew up in the Inwood neighborhood of Manhattan and was raised as a Catholic. During childhood and his teens, Miranda spent at least one month each year with his grandparents in Vega Alta, Puerto Rico. Miranda has one older sister, Luz, who is the Chief Financial Officer of the MirRam Group, a strategic consulting firm in government and communications.

Miranda attended Hunter College Elementary School and Hunter College High School. Among his classmates was Chris Hayes, now a journalist. Hayes was Miranda's first director when he starred in a school play, which was described by Hayes as "a 20-minute musical that featured a maniacal fetal pig in a nightmare that [Miranda] had cut up in biology class". His classmates also included rapper Immortal Technique, who had bullied Miranda, although the two later became friends. Miranda began writing musicals at school.

Miranda wrote the earliest draft of what would become his first Broadway musical, In the Heights, in 1999, during his sophomore year of college at Wesleyan University. After the show was accepted by Wesleyan's student theater company, Second Stage, Miranda added freestyle rap and salsa numbers, and the show was premiered there in 1999. Miranda wrote and directed several other musicals at Wesleyan and acted in many other productions, ranging from musicals to William Shakespeare. He graduated from Wesleyan in 2002.

== Career ==
=== Theater ===
==== 2002–2011: In The Heights ====
In 2002, Miranda and John Buffalo Mailer worked with director Thomas Kail to revise In the Heights. Playwright Quiara Alegría Hudes joined the team in 2004. After premiering in Connecticut in 2005 and opening at the 37 Arts Theater off-Broadway in 2007, the musical went to Broadway, opening in March 2008.

It was nominated for 13 Tonys, winning four, including Best Musical and Best Original Score. It also won the Grammy Award for Best Musical Theater Album. Miranda's performance in the leading role of Usnavi earned him a nomination for a Tony. Miranda left the cast of the Broadway production on February 15, 2009.

Miranda reprised the role when the national tour played in Los Angeles from June 23 to July 25, 2010. He again joined the tour in San Juan, Puerto Rico. Miranda rejoined the cast as Usnavi from December 25, 2010, until the production closed on January 9, 2011, after 29 previews and 1,185 regular performances.

Miranda created other work for the stage during this period. He wrote Spanish-language dialogue and worked with Stephen Sondheim to translate into Spanish song lyrics for the 2009 Broadway revival of West Side Story. During this time, he also performed at bar and bat mitzvahs. In 2008, he was invited by composer-lyricist Stephen Schwartz to contribute two new songs to a revised version of Schwartz and Nina Faso's 1978 musical Working, which opened in May 2008 at the Asolo Repertory Theatre in Sarasota, Florida.

During these years, Miranda worked as an English teacher at his former high school, wrote for the Manhattan Times as a columnist and restaurant critic, and composed music for commercials.

In 2003, Miranda co-founded Freestyle Love Supreme, a hip hop improv group that has toured the Edinburgh Festival Fringe, as well as the Aspen, Melbourne and Montreal Comedy festivals. The group created a limited television series for Pivot in 2014 and made its Broadway debut on October 2, 2019, at the Booth Theatre. The self-titled show gained positive reviews.

==== 2011–2014: Bring It On and other theatrical work ====
Miranda co-wrote the music and lyrics for Bring It On with Tom Kitt and Amanda Green. It premiered at the Alliance Theatre in Atlanta, Georgia in January 2011. The musical began a US national tour on October 30, 2011, in Los Angeles, California. It played a limited engagement on Broadway at the St. James Theatre, beginning previews on July 12, and officially opening on August 1, 2012. It closed on December 30, 2012. It was nominated for Tony Awards in the categories of Best Musical and Best Choreography.

In February 2012, Miranda appeared in Merrily We Roll Along, in the role of Charley, in an Encores! staged concert at New York City Center.

His theatrical achievements in 2014 included an Emmy for the song "Bigger!", which he and Kitt co-wrote for the opening number at the 67th Tony Awards.

Miranda wrote music and lyrics for the one-act musical 21 Chump Street, and performed as narrator for the show's single performance at the Brooklyn Academy of Music on June 7, 2014. It was broadcast on National Public Radio's This American Life on June 20, 2014. Later that month, he starred in the June 2014 Encores! revival of Jonathan Larson's Tick, Tick... Boom!, under the artistic direction of Jeanine Tesori. The show was directed by Oliver Butler.

Earlier in 2014, he guest starred in a show by comedy duo The Skivvies.

==== 2011–2016: Hamilton ====
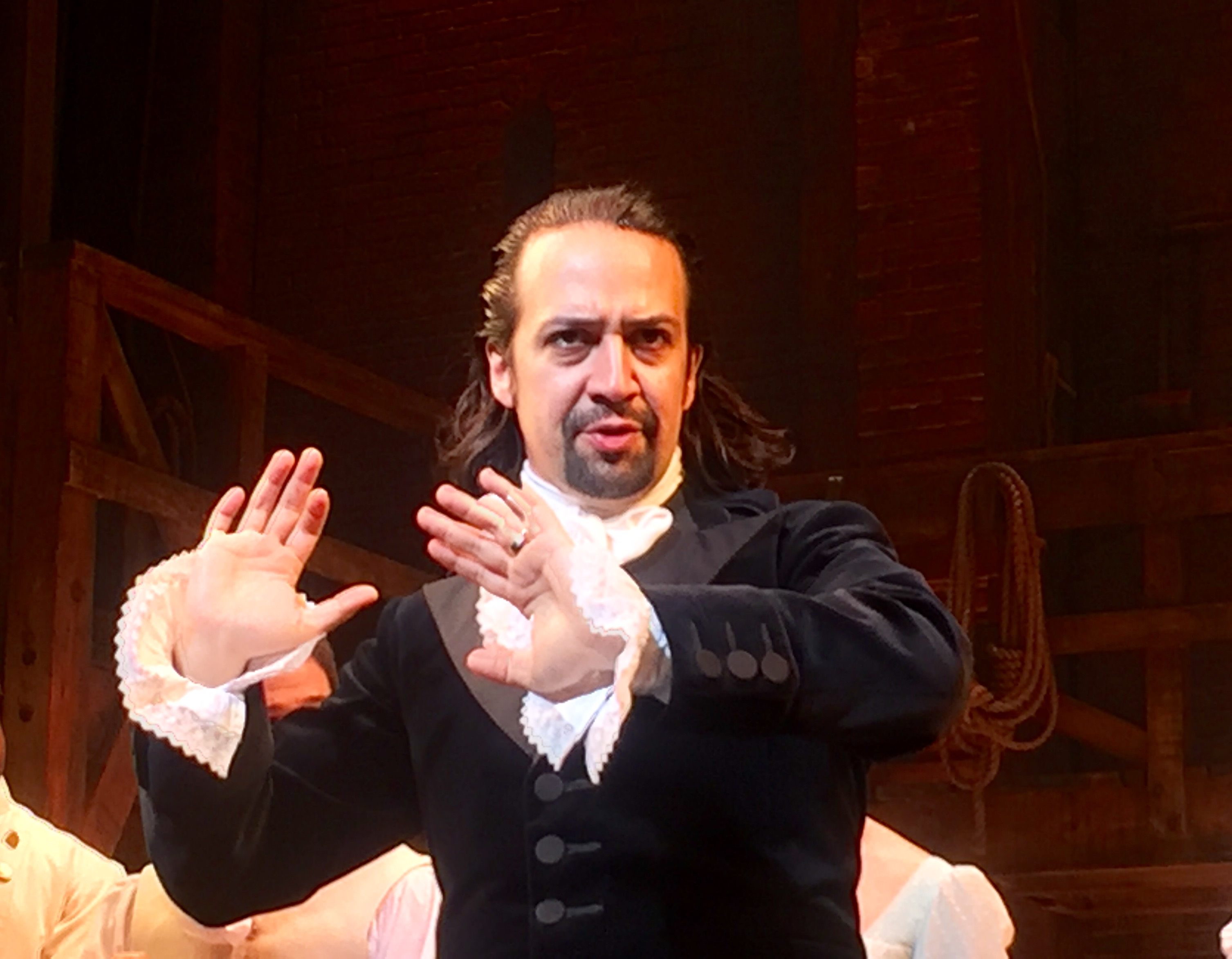
Miranda in Hamilton, 2016

While on vacation in 2008, Miranda had read Ron Chernow's biography of Alexander Hamilton. Inspired by the book, he wrote a rap about Hamilton that he performed for the White House Evening of Poetry, Music, and the Spoken Word on May 12, 2009, accompanied by Alex Lacamoire. Miranda later said he spent a year writing the Hamilton song "My Shot", revising it countless times so that every verse would reflect Alexander Hamilton's intellect. By 2012, Miranda was performing an extended set of pieces based on the life of Hamilton, which he referred to as the Hamilton Mixtape. The New York Times called it "an obvious game changer".

Hamilton premiered off-Broadway at The Public Theater in January 2015, directed by Thomas Kail. Miranda wrote the book and score, and starred as the title character. The show received highly positive reviews, and its engagement was sold out. Chernow and Miranda received the 2015 History Makers Award from the New York Historical Society for their work in creating the musical. The show began previews on Broadway in July 2015 at the Richard Rodgers Theatre and officially opened on August 6, 2015, earning positive reviews. On the first night of Hamilton previews, over 700 people lined up for lottery tickets. The Hamilton ticket lottery evolved into Ham4Ham, a series of outdoor mini-performances for lottery participants that was hosted daily by Miranda and cast members for over a year, until August 31, 2016.

Miranda earned a 3% royalty on each performance of Hamilton, earning him $12.7 million by July 2017. Hamilton won the Tony Award for Best Musical; Miranda won Tonys for Best Original Score and Best Book Of A Musical, and was nominated for Best Actor in a Musical. Miranda won a Pulitzer for the musical, and the cast album won the Grammy. In May 2016, for his work in the role of Alexander Hamilton, Miranda received the Drama League Distinguished Performance Award.

Miranda performs freestyle rap with President Barack Obama.

On March 15, 2016, members of the cast of Hamilton performed at the White House and hosted workshops; Miranda performed freestyle rap from prompts held up by President Obama. In April 2016, Miranda and Jeremy McCarter published Hamilton: The Revolution, a book describing Hamilton's journey from conception to Broadway success. It also discusses the sense of cultural revolution that permeates the show.

Miranda gave his last performance in Hamilton on July 9, 2016, but vowed to return to the show. In 2017, he announced that he would reprise the role for one night in celebration of President Obama's commutation of the sentence of Oscar López Rivera.

A documentary about the creation of the show, Hamilton's America, featuring Miranda, premiered at the New York Film Festival on October 1, 2016, and first aired on PBS' Great Performances series on October 21, 2016. A taping of the OBT version of Hamilton was released on Disney+ on July 3, 2020.

On January 24, 2016, Miranda performed the offstage cameo role of Loud Hailer in the Broadway production of Les Misérables, fulfilling his childhood dream of being in the show, as it was the first production he ever saw on Broadway.

==== 2019–present: Return to theatre ====
In January 2019, Miranda reprised the title role in Hamilton for a three-week limited engagement at the Luis A. Ferré Performing Arts Center in Puerto Rico from January 11–27, 2019, for which the engagement was sold out in three hours in November 2018. In a review, Chris Jones praised "deeper on-stage emotions" in Miranda's reprisal, as well as improved vocal and dance technique than on Broadway. In March that same year he played King Arthur in a benefit concert of Camelot at Lincoln Center opposite Solea Pfeiffer and Jordan Donica.

In 2023, he wrote additional lyrics for the Broadway musical New York, New York.

In August 2023, it was reported that he had begun work on a stage musical adaptation of the novel The Warriors (which was previously adapted into a 1979 film). Miranda worked with Eisa Davis on a concept album based on the novel titled Warriors, which was released on October 18, 2024. Adapted for the stage, the Warriors musical, which is now described as being based on both the novel and the movie, is set to begin previews on Broadway in March 2027 at the Lunt-Fontanne Theatre.

=== Film ===
==== 2012–2014: Early work ====
Miranda made his feature film debut in the Walt Disney Pictures live-action film The Odd Life of Timothy Green (2012).

==== 2015–present: Disney projects and directorial debut ====
Miranda interviewed with Disney in the winter of 2013. He submitted a six-song demo package to Walt Disney Animation Studios. This began a series of collaborations with the company:

- Moana – In the spring of 2014, the studio hired Miranda to help write and perform music for Moana, its 2016 animated feature film. From 2014 to 2016, Miranda collaborated with Opetaia Foa'i and Mark Mancina on the songs for Moana. He later explained that because he was so busy with Moana and Hamilton, he turned down other projects "that would have distracted" him, but this served as an "ego check" as Hamilton became a hit. Moana opened in November 2016 and was a box office hit, earning positive reviews and praise from critics for Miranda's songwriting. Miranda also sang the song "We Know the Way" in the film, and recorded a duet with Jordan Fisher of the song "You're Welcome", which was played over the film's end credits. For the song "How Far I'll Go", Miranda won a Grammy Award for Best Song Written for Visual Media, and received Golden Globe, Critics' Choice, and Oscar nominations.
- Star Wars: The Force Awakens – While working on Hamilton, Miranda contributed music for the Disney-distributed film Star Wars: The Force Awakens (2015), writing a song for the scene in Maz Kanata's cantina, an homage to the classic Mos Eisley Cantina scene and song by Figrin D'an and the Modal Nodes.
- DuckTales – Miranda debuted in May 2018 as the voice of Fenton "Gizmoduck" Crackshell-Cabrera in Disney Channel's 2017 reboot of DuckTales, and made recurring appearances throughout the show's run.
- Mary Poppins Returns – Miranda plays Jack, a lamplighter, and former apprentice to Bert, the chimney sweep played by Dick Van Dyke in the original 1964 film Mary Poppins. This was his first major role after leaving the Broadway cast of Hamilton. Miranda traveled to London in 2017 to shoot his scenes for the film, directed by Rob Marshall, which was released in December 2018.
- Star Wars: The Rise of Skywalker – Following his work on The Force Awakens, Miranda contributed music for the Disney-distributed film Star Wars: The Rise of Skywalker (2019), writing a song for the scene on the desert planet Pasaana, in addition to making a cameo appearance as a Resistance trooper.
- The live stage recording of the original Broadway production of Hamilton was acquired by Walt Disney Pictures and released on Disney+ on July 3, 2020.
- Encanto – Miranda collaborated again with Walt Disney Animation Studios on an animated musical titled Encanto directed by Jared Bush and Byron Howard, with Charise Castro Smith co-directing. The film was released on November 24, 2021. The soundtrack was a success; the song "We Don't Talk About Bruno" rose to number one on the US Billboard Hot 100, and Miranda received an Academy Award for Best Original Song nomination for the song "Dos Oruguitas".
- The Little Mermaid – In August 2016, Miranda agreed to write songs with Alan Menken for Disney's forthcoming live-action remake of The Little Mermaid. Miranda co-produced the film with Marc Platt and Rob Marshall, the latter of whom directed. Menken announced in July 2017 that he and Miranda had begun working on new songs for the project. Miranda and Menken wrote four new songs for The Little Mermaid, which had been recorded by April 2020. The film was released in theaters on May 26, 2023.
- Mufasa: The Lion King – Miranda is a longtime fan of The Lion King (1994) and was eager to work on this prequel/sequel to the 2019 live-action adaptation of that film, but director Barry Jenkins had to first wait six months for him. Miranda was too busy in the second half of 2021 with finishing the songs for Encanto, editing his first feature film as a director and doing press interviews to promote In The Heights, Vivo and Encanto (all released in 2021). He got started on writing the songs for Mufasa at the beginning of 2022. This timing conflict explains why in the meantime, Disney Animation chose to recruit Abigail Barlow and Emily Bear to write the songs for what was then planned as a direct-to-streaming series and eventually became the feature-length sequel Moana 2 (2024). Miranda and Jenkins appeared together at D23: The Ultimate Fan Event in Anaheim, California on August 10, 2024, to present the full theatrical trailer for Mufasa. Although Miranda by that point had already been working with Disney for a decade, this was his first in-person appearance at a D23 event. The film premiered on December 20, 2024.

A feature film adaptation of In the Heights spent many years in development. On November 7, 2008, Universal Pictures announced that they planned to adapt it as a film for release in 2011. However, the project was canceled in March 2011, reportedly due to the fact Universal was looking for a "bankable Latino star" like Shakira or Jennifer Lopez instead of unknown actors. In January 2012, Miranda stated that the film adaptation was back under discussion; in May 2016, it was announced that Miranda would co-produce the film with Harvey Weinstein and backing from The Weinstein Company. On June 10, 2016, Jon M. Chu came on board to direct the film adaptation of the musical. In the aftermath of numerous sexual misconduct allegations made against Weinstein, his producer credit on the film was removed, with the rights to the film eventually auctioned off to Warner Bros. for $50 million. While Miranda originated the role of Usnavi, he felt he was too old to star as Usnavi in the film adaptation. Ultimately, Miranda played the smaller role of Piraguero, the "Piragua Guy", in the film. He was quoted as saying the Broadway production was "...a miraculous experience. I went from substitute teacher to Broadway composer. I will never make a leap that big again in my life. I was very content to let Anthony Ramos and this incredible cast have their own experience." Miranda also served as producer and acted alongside Anthony Ramos, Corey Hawkins, Leslie Grace, and Jimmy Smits. The film was set for release on June 26, 2020, but was pulled from the schedule due to the COVID-19 pandemic's impact on the film industry. It was released in theaters and temporarily on HBO Max on June 10, 2021.

Imagine Entertainment announced in July 2018 that Miranda would make his debut as a film director with an adaptation of Jonathan Larson's semi-autobiographical musical Tick, Tick... Boom!, to be scripted by Dear Evan Hansen librettist Steven Levenson. Miranda produced the film alongside Ron Howard and Brian Grazer. The film starred Andrew Garfield and was released on Netflix in 2021. The same year, Miranda starred as the titular character in addition to providing eleven songs and serving as an executive producer for Vivo, a Sony Pictures Animation film directed by Kirk DeMicco which was released on Netflix in August 2021. Miranda agreed in 2016 to serve as executive producer and composer of Lionsgate's film adaptation of The Kingkiller Chronicle by Patrick Rothfuss, as well as a tie-in television series. In 2022, it was revealed that he was no longer attached to the project.

In April 2026, it was announced that Miranda would direct a film adaptation of the Dave Malloy musical, Octet.

=== Television series ===
==== 2007–2013: Early roles ====
Miranda also worked in television. In 2007, he made a small appearance on the television series The Sopranos in the episode "Remember When", and in 2009, he played Juan "Alvie" Alvarez, Gregory House's roommate in a psychiatric hospital, in the two-hour season six premiere episode of House; he returned to the role in May 2010. For Sesame Street, he occasionally played roles and sang the theme song to the recurring segment Murray Has a Little Lamb. He was a composer and actor on the 2009 PBS Kids Go! revival of The Electric Company and appeared in the CollegeHumor sketch "Hardly Working: Rap Battle", playing himself working as an intern and rapper.

He played several television roles during this period. He appeared on the TV series Modern Family in the 2011 episode "Good Cop Bad Dog". In 2013, he played the recurring role of Ruben Marcado in the NBC drama Do No Harm. He later appeared in the CBS sitcom How I Met Your Mother, in an all-verse episode titled "Bedtime Stories" that aired in November 2013.

==== 2016–present: Comedy roles and other projects ====
On April 24, 2016, on the TV show Last Week Tonight with John Oliver, at the end of a segment about the debt crisis in Puerto Rico, Miranda performed an emotional rap about allowing the island to restructure its debt. Miranda hosted Saturday Night Live on October 8, 2016, and played himself in two episodes of Curb Your Enthusiasm in 2017, receiving Emmy Award nominations for both appearances. In 2019, Miranda was the guest narrator at Disney's Candlelight Processional at Disneyland. Miranda performed the theme song for the Netflix original series The Magic School Bus Rides Again, the revival and sequel series of the 1994 series The Magic School Bus. He played the part of Amy's brother (David Santiago) in the episode "The Golden Child" in Brooklyn Nine-Nine.

In 2019, Miranda served as an executive producer on the FX limited series Fosse/Verdon based on the relationship of Broadway dancer, choreographer, and director Bob Fosse and his wife dancer Gwen Verdon. Miranda also made a brief appearance playing Roy Scheider from All That Jazz. The series won critical acclaim, and Miranda was nominated for the Primetime Emmy Award for Outstanding Limited or Anthology Series as an executive producer.

Miranda was cast as Lee Scoresby in the BBC series television adaptation of His Dark Materials (2019–2022). Daniel Fienberg of The Hollywood Reporter praised Miranda in his review writing, "[While] I appreciate that Miranda feels initially miscast as Pullman's paragon of cowboy American masculinity...[he] forces you to reconstruct an image of American manliness around him, making him exactly what the series needs".

On July 29, 2019, it was announced that Miranda had teamed with TV producer Norman Lear to make an American Masters documentary about the life of Puerto Rican actress Rita Moreno, titled Rita Moreno: Just a Girl Who Decided to Go for It. It premiered at the 2021 Sundance Film Festival. Miranda, in collaboration with Brittany Howard, Daveed Diggs, Kristen Anderson-Lopez, and Robert Lopez, wrote the lyrics for the song "Checks and Balances", which was sung by Benjy Brooke for the 2021 Netflix animated series We the People.

Miranda has appeared in the television show Percy Jackson and the Olympians as Hermes, messenger of the gods.

=== Music ===
Miranda was listed as a producer on the track "Peanuts 2 N Elephant" from Lil Wayne's fourteenth solo studio album, Tha Carter VI. He provided backing vocals for several tracks on the 2025 Mountain Goats album Through This Fire Across from Peter Balkan.

== Personal life ==
=== Family ===
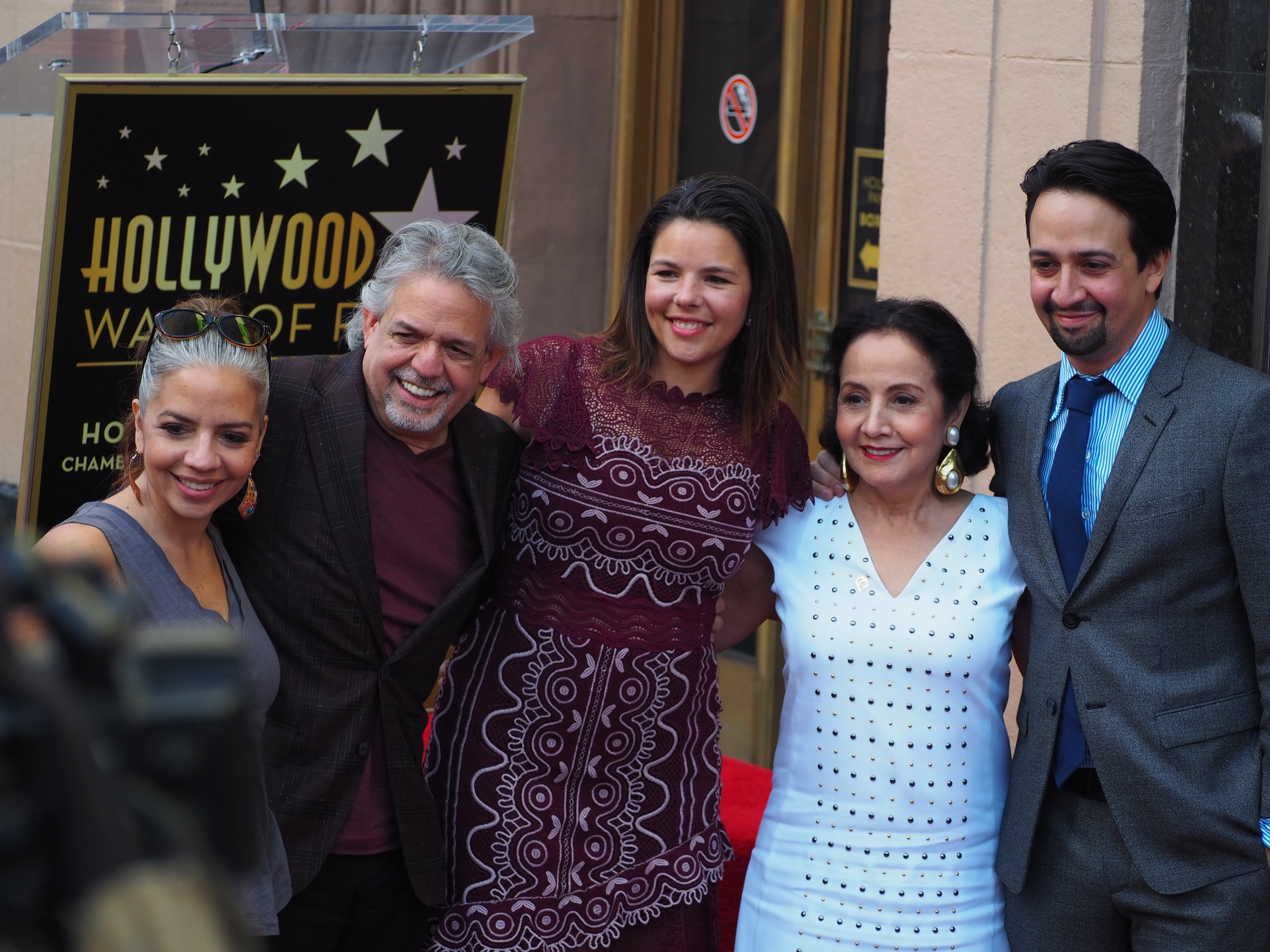
Miranda (right) with his family upon receiving a star on the Hollywood Walk of Fame in 2018. Nadal is in the center.

Miranda and his wife, Vanessa Nadal, attended high school together and married in 2010. Nadal is a graduate of Massachusetts Institute of Technology (MIT) and the Fordham University School of Law. She was a lawyer at the law firm Jones Day from 2010 to 2016. At the wedding reception, Miranda, along with the wedding party, performed the Fiddler on the Roof song "To Life". His wife is Dominican and Austrian, which gave him some German language familiarity when collaborating on the German translation of Hamilton.

Miranda and Nadal have two sons: Sebastian (b. 2014) and Francisco (b. 2018). His son Sebastian was named after the Jamaican crab from The Little Mermaid, one of his favorite films, the reason for which he took the job of composing the music for the live-action version. Sebastian was the first name listed in the production babies credits of Moana, for which Miranda wrote the songs. Miranda said Sebastian was bilingual in English and Spanish, and also knew some German. Miranda's son Francisco is listed as a production baby in the credits for Vivo.

Miranda discovered that he is related to artists Residente and iLe of Calle 13 during a 2009 concert by the group in San Juan, Puerto Rico, where Miranda was invited to perform. Backstage, the mother of Residente and ILE revealed their connection to Gilberto Concepción de Gracia, founder of the Puerto Rican Independence Party. Miranda and Residente have since confirmed the relationship. In 2017, Miranda performed on the opening track of Residente's self-titled debut album.

Miranda is a cousin of professional baseball player José Miranda.

=== Activism ===
After a meeting with President Barack Obama in March 2016, Miranda joined U.S. Senators Kirsten Gillibrand, Chuck Schumer, Elizabeth Warren, and other Democratic lawmakers to call for congressional action to back a Senate bill in Washington that would allow Puerto Rico to declare bankruptcy and significantly ease its $70 billion government-debt burden. Miranda was particularly active in the wake of Hurricane Maria's devastation in Puerto Rico, and by December 2017, proceeds from his song "Almost Like Praying" helped the Hispanic Federation raise $22 million for rescue efforts and disaster relief.

Miranda used proceeds from Hamilton to support Graham Windham, a nonprofit adoption agency founded by Elizabeth Schuyler Hamilton. Miranda performed at their fundraising gala benefits in New York City to help fundraise for children in foster care.

He performed "Found/Tonight" with Ben Platt at the March for Our Lives anti-gun violence rally in Washington, D.C., on March 24, 2018.

In order to raise money for Puerto Rico's reconstruction after being struck by hurricanes Irma and María, including at least $15 million to be channeled through the Flamboyán Foundation, Miranda decided to take Hamilton to his father's native Puerto Rico, reprising his role as the protagonist. Miranda's family donated approximately $1 million to bring the University of Puerto Rico theater up to par in order to use it as the venue for the musical's performance in January 2018. After tickets sold out in two hours for the three-week run, producers decided to move out of the university venue due to warnings of potential disruptions by a university workers' labor organization, and move the already-installed set to the Luis A. Ferré Performing Arts Center in Santurce, where the performances ran from January 11 to January 27. The production donated additional hundreds of thousands of dollars in improvements to the Ferré Performing Arts Center.

In 2016, Miranda advocated for the passing of the Puerto Rico Oversight, Management, and Economic Stability Act (PROMESA), a law to restructure Puerto Rico's debt following Hurricane Maria. The law led to budget cuts resulting in the closure of over 200 public schools, cuts to government labor benefits, and budget cuts at the University of Puerto Rico (UPR). It was met with protests, with UPR shutting down due to student strikes over the measures in 2017, and Miranda himself became a target of criticism. Miranda met with protestors after his Hamilton performance in Puerto Rico, explaining that he had seen PROMESA as the only bipartisan option for the debt crisis and does not support the island's controversial austerity measures. He has since argued for full debt-relief for the island, noting that the 2016 act has not led to promised relief.

== Awards and honors ==
External videos
- Playwright, Composer, and Performer Lin-Manuel Miranda, 2015 MacArthur Fellow, MacArthur Foundation

Among his numerous accolades, Miranda has won a Pulitzer Prize, five Grammys, three Tony Awards, two Primetime Emmy Awards, and two Olivier Awards and has been nominated for two Academy Awards. In 2015, he was the recipient of a Genius Grant from the MacArthur Fellows Program. In 2016, Time magazine included Miranda in its annual Time 100 as one of the "Most Influential People in the World" and he received a star on the Puerto Rico Walk of Fame. Miranda received a star on the Hollywood Walk of Fame on November 30, 2018. In December 2018, he received the Kennedy Center Honors for creating Hamilton.

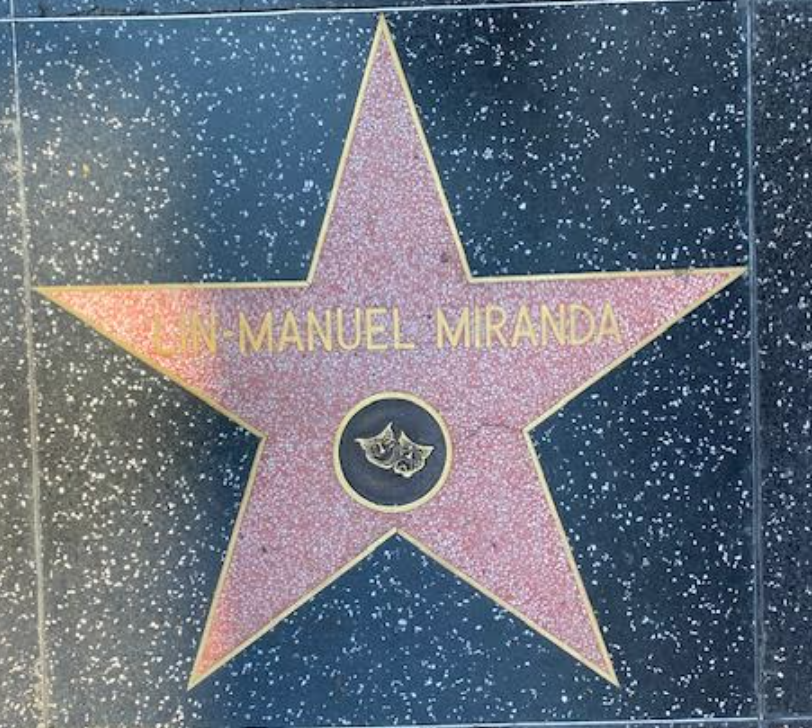
Miranda's star on the Hollywood Walk of Fame.

In 2015, Miranda was the recipient of Smithsonian Magazine's American Ingenuity Award in the History category. In 2019, Smithsonian National Portrait Gallery awarded Miranda the Portrait of a Nation prize. The Hamilton Mixtape, a cover album by Miranda, further reached number one on the Billboard 200.

In 2026, Miranda was honored as a Disney Legend at the D23 convention.

=== Honorary degrees ===
Miranda received an honorary degree in 2009 from Yeshiva University in Washington Heights, Manhattan, becoming the youngest person to receive an honorary degree from that university. Ed Koch, former mayor of New York City, presented Miranda with the degree.

He received the honorary degree of Doctor of Humane Letters in 2015 from his alma mater, Wesleyan University, and gave their commencement address. In May 2016, he received an honorary Doctorate of the Arts from the University of Pennsylvania and gave the commencement speech. In July 2016, The University of Puerto Rico granted him a doctorate, honoris causa. In July 2022, he received an honorary doctorate from the Royal Academy of Music in London, England.

== Works ==
=== Theatre ===
Year	Title	Role	Details	Notes
1999	In the Heights	Usnavi de la Vega	Wesleyan University, April 20–22	Also composer and lyricist
2005	In the Heights	Usnavi de la Vega	Unknown, Workshop	Also composer and lyricist
2005	In the Heights	—N/a	Eugene O'Neill Theater Center	Composer and lyricist
2007	In the Heights	Usnavi de la Vega	Off-Broadway, February 8 – July 15, 2007	Also composer and lyricist
2008–09	In the Heights	Usnavi de la Vega	Broadway, February 14, 2008 – February 15, 2009	Also composer and lyricist
2008–11	In the Heights	—N/a	Broadway, February 14, 2008 – January 9, 2011	Composer and lyricist
2009–11	In the Heights	—N/a	North American tour, October 27, 2009 – April 3, 2011	Composer and lyricist
2009	West Side Story	—N/a	Broadway revival	Spanish translations
2010	In the Heights	Usnavi de la Vega	North American tour, June 22 - July 25, 2010	Also composer and lyricist
2010–11	In the Heights	Usnavi de la Vega	Broadway, December 25, 2010 – January 9, 2011	Also composer and lyricist
2011	Working	—N/a	Chicago revival	Wrote two new songs
2011–12	Bring It On	—N/a	Broadway and US tour	Co-composer and lyricist
2012	Merrily We Roll Along	Charley Kringas	Encores!, February 8–9, 2012	
2013	In the Heights	Usnavi de la Vega	United Palace	Also composer and lyricist
2013	Hamilton	Alexander Hamilton	Vassar College, Workshop	Also composer, lyricist, and created book
2014	Hamilton	Alexander Hamilton	The 52nd Street Project, Workshop	Also composer, lyricist, and created book
2014	21 Chump Street	Narrator	Brooklyn Academy of Music, June 7, 2014	Also composer, lyricist, and created book
2014	Tick, Tick... Boom!	Jonathan	Encores!, June 25–28, 2014	
2015	Hamilton	Alexander Hamilton	Off-Broadway, January 20 – May 3, 2015	Also composer, lyricist, and created book
2015–16	Hamilton	Alexander Hamilton	Broadway, July 13, 2015 – July 9, 2016	Also composer, lyricist, and created book
2015–present	Hamilton	—N/a	Broadway, July 13, 2015 – present	Composer, lyricist, and created book
2016	Les Misérables	Loud Hailer	Broadway, January 24, 2016	Voice only
2016–20	Hamilton	—N/a	CIBC Theatre, September 27, 2016 – January 5, 2020	Composer, lyricist, and created book
2017–present	Hamilton	—N/a	Various North American tours, March 10, 2017 – present	Composer, lyricist, and created book
2017–present	Hamilton	—N/a	West End, December 6, 2017 – present	Composer, lyricist, and created book
2019	Hamilton	Alexander Hamilton	Luis A. Ferré Performing Arts Center, January 11–27, 2019	Limited engagement; also composer, lyricist, and created book
2019	Camelot	King Arthur	Broadway, March 4, 2019	
2019–20	Freestyle Love Supreme	Himself	Broadway, October 2, 2019 – January 12, 2020	Selected performances
2021–22	Freestyle Love Supreme	Himself	Broadway, October 19, 2021 – January 2, 2022	Selected performances
2023	New York, New York	—N/a	Broadway, March 24 – July 30, 2023	Additional lyrics
2023	Gutenberg! The Musical!	The Guest Producer	Broadway, October 19, 2023	One night cameo
2023–24	Hamilton	—N/a	International tour, May 26, 2023 – June 9, 2024	Composer, lyricist, and created book
2023–present	Hamilton	—N/a	UK & Ireland tour, November 11, 2023 – present	Composer, lyricist, and created book
2024–25	Gypsy	—N/a	Broadway, November 21, 2024 – August 17, 2025	Co-producer
2025	All In: Comedy About Love	Performer	Broadway, January 14 – February 16, 2025	
2025–present	Buena Vista Social Club	—N/a	Broadway, February 21, 2025 – present	Co-producer
2026	Proof	—N/a	Broadway, March 31 – July 19, 2026	Co-producer
2026	In the Heights	—N/a	Off-Broadway concert production, October 28 – November 15, 2026	Composer and lyricist
2027	Warriors	—N/a	Broadway, premiering in March 2027	Composer, lyricist, co-producer and created book

=== Film ===
Lin-Manuel Miranda's film credits
Year	Title	Role	Notes
1996	Clayton's Friends	Pete	Also writer, director, editor, and producer
2012	The Odd Life of Timothy Green	Reggie	
2012	The Polar Bears	Jak (voice)	Short film
2013	200 Cartas	Raúl	
2015	Star Wars: The Force Awakens	Shag Kava (voice)	Cameo appearance Also special featured composer and lyricist
2016	Studio Heads	Himself	Short film
2016	Moana	—N/a	Composer, lyricist and singer
2017	Speech & Debate	The Genie	
2018	Mary Poppins Returns	Jack	
2019	Star Wars: The Rise of Skywalker	Resistance Soldier	Cameo appearance; also special featured composer and lyricist
2020	Hamilton	Alexander Hamilton	Also writer, composer, lyricist and producer
2020	Siempre, Luis	Himself	Documentary
2020	Mucho Mucho Amor: The Legend of Walter Mercado	Himself	Documentary
2021	Rita Moreno: Just a Girl Who Decided to Go for It	Himself	Documentary; also executive producer
2021	In the Heights	Piragüero	Also composer, lyricist and producer
2021	Summer of Soul	Himself	Documentary
2021	Vivo	Vivo (voice)	Also composer, lyricist and executive producer
2021	Tick, Tick... Boom!	Moondance cook	Cameo appearance; also director and producer
2021	Encanto	—N/a	Composer, lyricist and story writer
2022	Weird: The Al Yankovic Story	Doctor	
2022	Aristotle and Dante Discover the Secrets of the Universe	—N/a	Producer
2023	The Little Mermaid	—N/a	Lyricist and producer
2024	Mufasa: The Lion King	—N/a	Composer and lyricist
2026	Moana	—N/a	Composer, lyricist and producer
TBA	Octet	—N/a	Director

=== Television ===
Lin-Manuel Miranda's television credits
Year	Title	Role	Notes
2007	The Sopranos	Bellman	Episode: "Remember When"
2009–2011	Sesame Street	Freddy Flapman; Lamb-Manuel Miranda	2 episodes; also composer and lyricist
2009–2010	House	Juan "Alvie" Alvarez	3 episodes
2009–2010	The Electric Company	Mario / Himself	17 episodes; also composer
2011	Modern Family	Guillermo	Episode: "Good Cop Bad Dog"
2011	65th Tony Awards	—N/a	Awards show; writer of the closing rap number
2012	Submissions Only	Auditioner #1	Episode: "Another Interruption"
2012	Freestyle Love Supreme	Himself	TV series; also lyricist
2013	Do No Harm	Ruben Marcado	11 episodes
2013	Smash	Himself	Episode: "The Transfer"
2013	67th Tony Awards	—N/a	Awards show; lyricist of the opening number "Bigger! "
2013	How I Met Your Mother	Gus	Episode: "Bedtime Stories"
2016	Inside Amy Schumer	Himself	Episode: "The World's Most Interesting Woman in the World"
2016	Last Week Tonight with John Oliver	Himself	Episode: "Puerto Rico"
2016	Hamilton's America	Himself	Television documentary
2016	Difficult People	Himself	Episode: "Carter"
2016	Drunk History	Himself	Episode: "Hamilton"
2016–2025	Saturday Night Live	Himself / various	1 episode as host, 3 episodes as guest
2017	My Brother, My Brother and Me	Himself	Episode: "Candlenights and Vape Ape"
2017	Curb Your Enthusiasm	Himself	2 episodes
2017–2020	BoJack Horseman	Crackerjack Sugarman (voice)	2 episodes
2017–2018	The Magic School Bus Rides Again	Matthew Math Matthews	Theme song singer Voice; Episode; Ralphie and the Flying Tennellis
2018	The Late Show with Stephen Colbert	John Adams	Episode: "Laura Linney/Sasheer Zamata/Lin-Manuel Miranda"
2018	Bartlett	Jesus	2 episodes
2018	Nina's World	Paquito Fernando (voice)	Episode: "Nina Live"
2018–2021	DuckTales	Fenton Crackshell-Cabrera / Gizmoduck (voice)	11 episodes
2019	Brooklyn Nine-Nine	Lieutenant David Santiago	Episode: "The Golden Child"
2019	Fosse/Verdon	Roy Scheider	Episode: "Providence"; also executive producer
2019–2022	His Dark Materials	Lee Scoresby	11 episodes
2020	Sesame Street: Elmo's Playdate	Himself	Television special
2020	One Day at a Time	Tio Juanito (voice)	Episode: "The Politics Episode"
2020	Take Me to the World: A Sondheim 90th Celebration	Himself	Television special; performed "Giants in the Sky"
2020	A West Wing Special to Benefit When We All Vote	Himself	Television special
2022	Bluey	Major Tom (voice)	Episode: "Stories"
2023	Big Mouth	Puerto Rican Pubic Hair (voice)	Episode: "The International Show"
2023–2025	Percy Jackson and the Olympians	Hermes	3 episodes
2026	Life, Larry and the Pursuit of Unhappiness	Michael Finney	Episode: "McCarthy"

=== Web series ===
Web series work by Lin-Manuel Miranda Lin-Manuel Miranda's web serie credits
Year	Title	Role	Notes
2009–2013	Hardly Working	Self (Freestyle Love Supreme)	3 episodes
2020	Some Good News	Himself	Episode: "Hamilton Cast Zoom Surprise"
2020	Lunch Doodles with Mo Willems!	Himself	Episode: "#10"

== Bibliography ==
=== Books ===
- Hamilton: The Revolution (2016) with Jeremy McCarter
- Gmorning, Gnight!: Little Pep Talks for Me & You (2018) with Jonny Sun
- In the Heights: Finding Home (2021) with Quiara Alegría Hudes and Jeremy McCarter

=== Articles ===
- "Pursuing the Muse Against the Clock", The New York Times (2014)
- "Stop the Bots from Killing Broadway", The New York Times (2016)
- "Give Puerto Rico Its Chance to Thrive", The New York Times (2016)

== Discography ==
=== Cast albums ===
Title	Album details	Peak chart positions							Certifications
Title	Album details	US	AUS	BEL (FL)	CAN	IRE	NZ	UK	Certifications
In the Heights	Released: June 3, 2008; Label: Sh-K-Boom; Format: LP, digital download, streaming	—	—	—	—	—	—	—	RIAA: Gold
Merrily We Roll Along	Released: July 10, 2012; Label: PS Classics; Format: LP, digital download, streaming	—	—	—	—	—	—	—	
Bring It On	Released: October 16, 2012; Label: Back Lot; Format: LP, digital download, streaming	—	—	—	—	—	—	—	
21 Chump Street	Released: June 19, 2014; Label: 5000 Broadway; Format: Digital download, streaming	—	—	—	—	—	—	—	
Hamilton	Released: September 25, 2015; Label: Atlantic; Format: LP, CD, digital download, streaming	2	6	136	2	52	7	58	RIAA: Diamond; RMNZ: Platinum; BPI: Platinum
"—" denotes items which did not chart in that territory.

=== Soundtrack albums ===
Title	Album details	Peak chart positions								Certifications
Title	Album details	US	AUS	BEL (FL)	CAN	IRE	NZ	SCO	UK	Certifications
Moana	Released: November 19, 2016; Label: Walt Disney; Format: LP, CD, digital download, streaming	2	2	49	4	9	1	5	7	RIAA: 5× Platinum; ARIA: Platinum; MC: 2× Platinum; RMNZ: 4× Platinum; BPI: Platinum
Mary Poppins Returns	Released: December 7, 2018; Label: Walt Disney; Format: LP, CD, digital download, streaming	34	15	85	73	—	—	—	—	
In The Heights	Released: June 10, 2021; Label: Atlantic, WaterTower; Format: LP, CD, digital download, streaming	45	59	—	—	—	—	—	—	
Vivo	Released: August 6, 2021; Label: Atlantic; Format: LP, CD, digital download, streaming	—	—	—	—	—	—	—	—	
Encanto	Released: November 19, 2021; Label: Walt Disney; Format: LP, CD, digital download, streaming	1	1	8	1	—	1	—	—	RIAA: 2× Platinum; MC: Platinum; RMNZ: Gold; BPI: Gold
The Little Mermaid	Released: May 19, 2023; Label: Walt Disney; Format: LP, CD, digital download, streaming	21	—	54	—	—	32	—	—	
Mufasa: The Lion King	Released: December 13, 2024; Label: Walt Disney; Format: LP, CD, digital download, streaming	169	—	119	—	—	—	—	—	
"—" denotes items which did not chart in that territory.

=== Soundtrack mixtapes ===
Title	Album details	Peak chart positions					Certifications
Title	Album details	US	AUS	BEL (FL)	CAN	NZ	Certifications
The Hamilton Mixtape	Released: December 2, 2016; Label: Atlantic; Format: CD, digital download, streaming	1	26	114	9	29	RIAA: Gold
Hamildrops: The Complete Collection	Released: May 22, 2025; Label: Rhino; Format: Digital download, streaming	—	—	—	—	—	—
"—" denotes items which did not chart in that territory.

=== Concept albums ===
Title	Album details
Warriors	Released: October 18, 2024; Label: Atlantic; Format: LP, CD, digital download, streaming

=== Instrumental albums ===
Title	Album details
The Hamilton Instrumentals	Released: June 30, 2017; Label: Atlantic; Format: Digital download, streaming

=== Singles ===
List of singles as lead artist, with selected chart positions and certifications
Title	Year	Peak chart positions			Certifications	Album
Title	Year	US	US Latin	US Latin Digital	Certifications	Album
"Jabba Flow" (with John Williams)	2015	—	—	—		Star Wars: The Force Awakens
"Love Make the World Go Round" (with Jennifer Lopez)	2016	72	—	—		Non-album singles
"What the World Needs Now Is Love" (with Broadway for Orlando)	2016	—	—	—		Non-album singles
"Crucible Cast Party" (as part of the cast of SNL)	2016	—	—	—		Non-album singles
"We Know The Way" (with Opetaia Foa'i)	2016	93	—	—	RIAA: 2× Platinum	Moana
"You're Welcome (Jordan Fisher Version)" (with Jordan Fisher)	2016	—	—	—		Moana
"Wrote My Way Out" (with Nas, Dave East, and Aloe Blacc)	2016	—	—	—		Hamilton Mixtape
"Almost Like Praying" (with Artists for Puerto Rico)	2017	20	3	1		Non-album singles
"Found/Tonight" (with Ben Platt)	2018	49	—	—		Non-album singles
"A Forgotten Spot" (with Zion & Lennox, De La Ghetto, Ivy Queen, PJ Sin Suela, and Lucecita Benitez)	2018	—	—	13		Non-album singles
"Rufio" (with Utkarsh Ambudkar and Dante Basco)	2018	—	—	—		Non-album singles
"Cheering For Me Now" (with John Kander)	2018	—	—	—		Non-album singles
"Trip a Little Light Fantastic" (from Mary Poppins Returns)	2018	—	—	—		Mary Poppins Returns
"Mr. Bojangles" (from Episode 8 of Fosse/Verdon)	2019	—	—	—		Fosse/Verdon
"Checks and Balances" (from the Netflix series We The People) (with Kristen Anderson-Lopez, Daveed Diggs, Brittany Howard, and Robert Lopez)	2021	—	—	—		Non-album singles
"Keep the Beat" (with Ynairaly Simo)	2021	—	—	—		Vivo
"Esperando Pelitos"	2023	—	—	—		Non-album singles
"—" denotes items which did not chart in that territory.

=== Production discography ===
List of production credits (excluding guest appearances, interpolations, and samples)
Track(s)	Year	Credit	Artist(s)	Album
13. "Peanuts 2 N Elephant"	2025	Producer	Lil Wayne	Tha Carter VI

=== Audiobook narration ===
- 2013: Aristotle and Dante Discover the Secrets of the Universe by Benjamin Alire Saenz
- 2016: Hamilton: The Revolution by Lin-Manuel Miranda, Jeremy McCarter, and Mariska Hargitay
- 2016: The Brief Wondrous Life of Oscar Wao by Junot Díaz
- 2018: Gmorning, Gnight!: Little Pep Talks for Me and You by Lin-Manuel Miranda
- 2021: Aristotle and Dante Dive into the Waters of the World by Benjamin Alire Saenz

== See also ==
- Nuyorican
- Nuyorican Movement
- Latino theatre in the United States
- Puerto Rican literature
- Latino literature
- Puerto Ricans in New York City
- Puerto Ricans in the United States
- List of Puerto Ricans
