= Octet (musical) =

Chamber choir musical

- Original album cover art
- Music: Dave Malloy
- Lyrics: Dave Malloy
- Book: Dave Malloy
- Productions: 2019 Signature Theatre Company; 2022 Berkeley Repertory Theatre; 2026 Studio Theatre
- Awards: Drama Desk Award for Outstanding Music; Lucille Lortel Award for Outstanding Musical; Obie Award for Collaboration on Music & Sound

Octet is a chamber choir musical written and composed by Dave Malloy and directed by Annie Tippe. The show "explores addiction and nihilism within the messy context of 21st century technology."

Eight Internet addicts gather in a support group called "Friends of Saul" in a church basement and share their stories, in a score for an a cappella chamber choir and an original libretto inspired by internet comment boards, scientific debates, religious texts, and Sufi poetry.

== Summary ==
In a "drab church basement on a rainy night", a group of eight meet as part of an internet addiction support group ("The Forest"). Paula, the group leader, apologizes for the absence of the founder, "Saul", and lays out the agenda for the meeting: the members will share their personal experiences in song, interspersed with a few hymns and group rituals. Jessica shares first, explaining she was cancelled after a public meltdown, and mourns her loss of privacy ("Refresh"). Henry shares his addiction to tile-matching video games focused on candy, expressing fear that the amount of time he wastes reflects a total lack of care for his own well-being ("Candy"). Another member, Karly, reminds the group they agree to avoid explicitly naming particular websites, apps, or platforms that are part of "The Monster" (the term the group uses to refer to the internet). Paula shares her own issue, describing how mindlessly scrolling on their phones comes between any intimacy for her and her husband in bed ("Glow"). The group then gathers for "Fugue State", where they stay quiet for a minute before sharing any thoughts that come up: during this, the group describe various internet activities such as sharing funny jokes or videos, expressing outrage over current events, vapid shows of solidarity on social media, playing 2048, and engaging in arguments ("Fugue State").

During a coffee break, Henry compliments Velma, the newest member, on her singing and the two discuss their relationship with technology: Velma recently went offline but still texts a friend she met online. She diagnoses Henry as having a "Recreational" addiction to his candy game, listing out the different addictions people have: "Recreational, Financial, Social, Sexual, and Informational", and that all of the group's issues fall into these categories. The two then discuss with the group how they were recruited by the elusive Saul, who not only lacks any kind of internet presence but only Paula and Marvin have met in real life. Velma expresses some fear that the group is a front for a cult, and launches into a rant about the tarot community, which she joined to escape a toxic niche community of which she was a previous member only to find just as much discourse, bemoaning that all she really wants is something pure and good. After the break, Paula leads the group in another hymn describing how the "monster" occupies the peace of their "Forest" ("Monster").

Karly and Ed share next, where the both of them find their sexual and romantic life is affected by their relationship to technology: Karly finds herself on a mindless string of dating app matches and dates with horrible men, yet fears lashing out or rejecting them could lead to violence; meanwhile Ed feels the pull of the incel community as a solution to his loneliness. The two agree that pornography has played a role in both of their issues, due to its ease of access and potentially catastrophic affect on brain chemistry ("Solo"). Toby suggests the problem goes much deeper, describing how easy access to violent content such as beheading videos and hate groups will affect the next generation, and that the internet is a tool to keep everyone distracted while those in power take from them. Conversely, he reaches the conclusion it is futile to try to fight against it, giving into nihilism ("Actually"). Marvin is the last to go. He elects to refrain from singing and instead describes a bizarre encounter with an entity claiming to be God who challenged him and his research team to prove its existence: the team instead had a complete existential crisis as they discovered every seeming miracle the entity performed could be brushed off through hypotheses and theories, leaving Marvin to realize his commitment to rationalism and skepticism also means he can explain away any sense of love, responsibility, or morals ("Little God"). Velma suggests he is "The Hanged Man" in a tarot deck, offering that he needed to go through this trial in order to get to "the really good stuff".

Lastly, Paula leads the group in the Tower Tea Ceremony, where they end the session by ingesting "a powerful group psychedelic that induces a 5-minute coma, in which your consciousness is transported back to its original, pure, pre-technological limbic state" ("Tower Tea Ceremony"). All participate except Velma, who elects not to drink her tea and instead shares her own story in the silence: that through her participation in the "lonely ugly chaos of the internet"—the only time the word is used instead of "monster"—she was able to meet a girl just like her, making her realize she was not alone ("Beautiful"). Paula then leads the group in a final, hopeful hymn ("The Field").

== Musical numbers ==
The musical is structured around a series of hymns and "shares," as the group members explain their relationship to technology. Each song corresponds to one of the Major Arcana cards in a tarot deck.

Part 1

1. "Hymn: The Forest" – All (XVIII, The Moon)
2. "Refresh" – Jessica & Chorus (V, The Hierophant)
3. "Candy" – Henry & Chorus (IX, The Hermit)
4. "Glow" – Paula & Chorus (II, The High Priestess)
5. "Fugue State" – All (X, Wheel of Fortune)

Part 2

6. "Hymn: Monster" – Women, All (XV, The Devil)
7. "Solo" – Karly, Ed, All (VI, The Lovers/XIII, Death)
8. "Actually" – Toby, Chorus (I, The Magician)
9. "Little God" – Marvin, Chorus (XII, The Hanged Man)
10. "Tower Tea Ceremony" – All (XVI, The Tower)
11. "Beautiful" – Velma (0, The Fool)
12. "Hymn: The Field" – All (XXI, The World)

== Productions ==
The piece premiered on May 19, 2019, at Off-Broadway at the Signature Theatre in New York City. It was extended three times in June, ultimately finishing on June 30.

The production was directed and choreographed by Annie Tippe, with music supervision and music direction by Or Matias, scenic design by Amy Rubin and Brittany Vasta, costume design by Brenda Abbandandolo, lighting by Christopher Bowser, sound design by Hidenori Nakajo, and production stage management by Jhanaë Bonnick.

Octet had its West Coast premiere at Berkeley Repertory Theatre on April 20, 2022, once again directed by Annie Tippe. It ran until May 29, 2022.

=== Regional productions ===
The musical's first non-replica regional production was produced at Hudson Valley Shakespeare Festival in Garrison, New York from August 11 to September 7, 2025. Directed by Amanda Dehnert, the cast included Jill Paice as Jessica and Adam Bashian reprising his role as Ed.

A co-production by Crow's Theatre, Soulpepper, and The Musical Stage Company was mounted as the professional Canadian premiere in Toronto, opening in September 2025.

The show was part of Studio Theatre's 2025-2026 season in Washington, D.C., opening in January 2026, directed by David Muse. It was the first musical by Malloy to be presented in D.C.

On May 22, 2025, Raven Theatre in Chicago, Illinois, announced that it would present the Midwest Regional and Chicago premiere of Octet, directed by Keira Fromm, as part of its 43rd season. The production began performances April 30, 2026 and will continue at the Raven to June 28, extended by popular demand from an original closing date of June 7 and will subsequently transfer to the Goodman Theatre from July 15 through August 2, extended from an original July 26 closing due to popular demand. The Chicago Tribune called the show “One of the highlights of the theater season” and gave the production a 4 out of 4 stars.

== Roles and principal casts ==
Character	Off-Broadway	Berkeley	Hudson Valley	Toronto	Washington, D.C.	Chicago	Film
Character	2019	2022	2025		2026		TBA
Ed	Adam Bashian	Adam Bashian	Adam Bashian	Giles Tomkins	Jimmy Kieffer	Ryder Dean McDaniel	Paul-Jordan Jansen
Karly	Kim Blanck	Kim Blanck	Melissa Mahoney	Hailey Gillis	Ana Marcu	Grace Steckler	Phillipa Soo
Paula	Starr Busby	Isabel Santiago	Alexis Tidwell	Zorana Sadiq	Tracy Lynn Olivera	Teressa LaGamba	Sheryl Lee Ralph
Henry	Alex Gibson	Alex Gibson	Gunnar Manchester	Damien Atkins	Angelo Harrington III	Sam Shankman	Jonathan Groff
Toby	Justin Gregory Lopez	Justin Gregory Lopez	Luis Quintero	Andrew Broderick	Aidan Joyce	Elliot Esquivel	Gaten Matarazzo
Marvin	J.D. Mollison	J.D. Mollison	Andy Nagraj	Ben Carlson	David Toshiro Crane	Jordan Golding	Tramell Tillman
Jessica	Margo Seibert	Margo Seibert	Jill Paice	Jacqueline Thair	Chelsea Williams	Neala Barron	Amanda Seyfried
Velma	Kuhoo Verma	Kuhoo Verma	Mia Pak	Alicia Ault	Amelia Aguilar	Joryhebel Ginorio	Rachel Zegler

== Influences ==
The program's bibliography cites several sources of inspiration, including:

Text
Douglas Adams, The Hitchhiker’s Guide to the Galaxy; Sherwood Anderson, Winesburg, Ohio; John Cage, Silence; Nicholas Carr, The Shallows; Chuang-Tzu; Ernest Cline, Ready Player One; Richard Dawkins, The God Delusion; Philip K. Dick, Valis; James Gleick, The Information; Jonathan Haidt, The Righteous Mind; Ray Kurzweil, The Singularity Is Near; C. S. Lewis, The Screwtape Letters; Angela Nagle, Kill All Normies; Michael Pollan, How to Change Your Mind; Catherine Price, How to Break Up with Your Phone; Jon Ronson, So You've Been Publicly Shamed; Rumi, “A Great Wagon”; George Saunders, Tenth of December; Wallace Shawn, Essays; Neal Stephenson, Snow Crash; Alan Watts, The Book; Walt Whitman, Leaves of Grass; Pete Walker, Complex PTSD: From Surviving to Thriving

Theater
Caryl Churchill, Love and Information; Marvin Hamlisch, Edward Kleban, James Kirkwood Jr. & Nicholas Dante, A Chorus Line; Stephen Sondheim & George Furth, Company

Tarot
The Rider–Waite–Smith Tarot; Kim Krans, The Wild Unknown Tarot

Film
Altered States; Black Mirror: S01E03 “The Entire History of You”; S03E01 “Nosedive”; S03E06 “Hated in the Nation”; Blade Runner; The Matrix; My Dinner with Andre

Podcasts
Reply All; Dear Sugar

Games
Candy Crush; Cookie Clicker; Everything; Inside; Journey; Universal Paperclips; The Witness; World of Warcraft

Music
Robert Ashley, Perfect Lives; Luciano Berio, Sinfonia; Philip Glass, Einstein on the Beach; Meredith Monk, Dolmen Music; Nico Muhly, Two Boys, Mothertongue; Sacred Harp; Caroline Shaw, Partita for 8 Voices; Toby Twining, Chrysalid Requiem

== Critical response ==
The piece was well received by the New York press. Ben Brantley of the New York Times calling it "a sublime chamber opera" that "promises to be the most original and topical musical of the year." He praised the performers as "uniformly excellent" and whose "layered and contrapuntal voices produce a dazzling spectrum of effects". Sara Holdren of Vulture wrote that "Octet is that rare and thrilling thing: a new musical that really does feel new. Formally, it’s both unique and invigorating — and it’s rigorous and straightforward enough in its structure for its ideas to spiral into rich, dense fractals. In the face of a virtual world where “there’s no coming back / No rehabilitation / No nuance / Just noise,” it takes a bravely unequivocal yet generous stand. It sings of darkness, blindness, and fear, but it sings also of complexity, connection, redemption, and hope."

Adam Feldman of Time Out New York gave Octet 5 ouf of 5 stars and wrote: "Under Annie Tippe’s taut direction, all eight bits of Octet’s byte-size cast perform Malloy’s challenging compositions with exceptional skill, abetted by Or Matias’s musical direction and Hidenori Nakajo’s sound design. As Broadway shows increasingly rely on massive spectacle, Octet proves that well-polished pieces of eight are enough." David Cote of Observer wrote that it was not only "one of the most thought-provoking and soul-stirring musicals I’ve seen in ages, it has an ingeniously woven, harmonically lush score that you’ll want to revisit."

== Awards and nominations ==
=== Original Off-Broadway production ===
Year	Award	Category	Nominee	Result
2020	Lucille Lortel Awards	Outstanding Musical		Won
2020	Lucille Lortel Awards	Outstanding Director	Anne Tippe	Won
2020	Lucille Lortel Awards	Outstanding Featured Actor in a Musical	Alex Gibson	Nominated
2020	Lucille Lortel Awards	Outstanding Featured Actress in a Musical	Kuhoo Verma	Won
2020	Lucille Lortel Awards	Outstanding Sound Design	Hidenori Nakajo	Nominated
2020	Drama Desk Awards	Outstanding Musical		Nominated
2020	Drama Desk Awards	Outstanding Director of a Musical	Anne Tippe	Nominated
2020	Drama Desk Awards	Outstanding Music	Dave Malloy	Won
2020	Drama Desk Awards	Outstanding Lyrics	Dave Malloy	Nominated
2020	Drama Desk Awards	Outstanding Book of a Musical	Dave Malloy	Nominated
2020	Drama Desk Awards	Outstanding Orchestrations	Or Matias and Dave Malloy	Nominated
2020	Drama Desk Awards	Outstanding Scenic Design of a Musical	Amy Rubin and Brittany Vasta	Nominated
2020	Drama Desk Awards	Outstanding Sound Design in a Musical	Hidenori Nakajo	Nominated
2020	Drama Desk Awards	Outstanding Ensemble	Adam Bashian, Kim Blanck, Starr Busby, Alex Gibson, Justin Gregory Lopez, J.D. Mollison, Margo Seibert, and Kuhoo Verma	Won
2020	Drama League Awards	Outstanding Production of a Musical		Nominated
2020	Outer Critics Circle Award	Outstanding New Off-Broadway Musical		Won
2020	Outer Critics Circle Award	Outstanding New Score	Dave Malloy	Honoree
2020	Obie Award	Collaboration on Music & Sound	Dave Malloy, Or Matias, Hidenori Nakajo	Won

== Cast recording ==
A cast recording was released on November 15, 2019 following a Kickstarter campaign.

== Film adaptation ==
In April 2026, it was announced that Octet would be adapted into a feature film with Lin-Manuel Miranda set to direct, and Malloy writing the screenplay as well as serving as executive producer. The cast will feature Amanda Seyfried as Jessica, Rachel Zegler as Velma, Sheryl Lee Ralph as Paula, Phillipa Soo as Karly, Gaten Matarazzo as Toby, Jonathan Groff as Henry, Tramell Tillman as Marvin, and Paul-Jordan Jansen as Ed.
