= Plan B (2021 film) =

- Official poster
- Directed by: Natalie Morales
- Screenplay by: Prathi Srinivasan; Joshua Levy
- Produced by: Ryan Bennett; Jeremy Garelick; Josh Heald; Dina Hillier; Jon Hurwitz; Mickey Liddell; Matt Lottman; Will Phelps; Hayden Schlossberg; Pete Shilaimon
- Starring: Kuhoo Verma; Victoria Moroles
- Cinematography: Sandra Valde-Hansen
- Edited by: Nathan Orloff; Brendan Walsh
- Music by: Isabella Manfredi
- Production companies: Counterbalance Entertainment; American High; LD Entertainment
- Distributed by: Hulu
- Release date: May 28, 2021 (United States)
- Running time: 107 minutes
- Country: United States
- Language: English

Plan B is a 2021 American coming-of-age comedy film directed by Natalie Morales from a screenplay by Prathi Srinivasan and Joshua Levy. The film stars Victoria Moroles and Kuhoo Verma. It is titled after the brand of emergency contraceptive, which is a significant factor in the film's plot.

It was released on May 28, 2021, by Hulu.

== Plot ==
In South Dakota, Sunny, a sheltered Indian teenager, is pressured into throwing a party by her rebellious, outgoing friend Lupe. Though she fears disobeying her mother — who is out of town on a business trip — she agrees in the hopes of impressing and seducing Hunter, her crush. After seeing Hunter leave the party with the more popular Megan, however, she winds up having sex with her friend Kyle, a somewhat eccentric devout Christian — both almost immediately realize the encounter was a mistake.

The next morning, Sunny informs Lupe that she has lost her virginity, but does not say to whom, leading Lupe to believe that she had sex with Hunter. In the bathroom, she is horrified to discover that she never removed the condom Kyle used during intercourse, fearing that she could become pregnant. Informing Lupe, the two set out to the local pharmacy to get a Plan B pill, but are denied. Following Lupe's suggestion, they decide their best option is to drive to the nearest Planned Parenthood — located in Rapid City — using Sunny's mom's car.

Sunny and Lupe get lost on the road and are redirected by a helpful convenience store clerk, whom they inform of Sunny's situation. She suggests they visit her cousin, a drug dealer based in a nearby playground. The girls confront the dealer, who offers them fake IDs in exchange for oral sex, and manage to escape with the IDs and an unmarked "birth control pill" after Sunny accidentally damages his penis. After Sunny falls asleep, Lupe drives to a bowling alley where she hopes to meet Logan — a person whom she met online and has been communicating with frequently. Sunny, while initially reluctant, quickly accepts due to the prospect of meeting Logan and pleasantly surprised to find that Hunter and his friends are at the alley as well. The girls split up — Lupe goes off to meet Logan, and Hunter invites Sunny to a nearby diner. Logan, revealed to be a female drummer, has sex with Lupe in Sunny's car. Meanwhile, after learning that Hunter only left her party to get Megan home safely rather than to have sex with her, Sunny confides in Hunter about her situation. Hunter holds no judgement towards Sunny, sympathizing with her and reassuring her that everything will work out. After Hunter drives her back to the bowling alley, the two kiss.

The girls reunite, but quickly discover Sunny's car (which Lupe left with Logan) to be missing. Despairing, Sunny takes the unmarked "birth control" pill they stole from the drug dealer — later revealed to be Amphetamine — and argues with Lupe, blaming her for their situation. Lupe realizes they can locate the car with a "Find My" app, which turns out to be parked at a nearby house party. Lupe finds and confronts Logan, who insists that the car wasn't taken by her, but by her band's lead singer, Xander. Lupe and Sunny find Xander to be extremely intoxicated. He attempts to attack the girls — they escape, but Sunny nearly runs Xander over. Xander is fine, but disoriented; Logan stays behind to take care of him, sharing a kiss with Lupe before the two part ways.

Back in the car, a now sober Sunny confronts Lupe on why she never told her about her true sexuality. Lupe admits she was afraid it would affect their friendship, which Sunny instantly dismisses as nonsense. Shortly after, Lupe discovers the true nature of Sunny's sexual encounter through a phone call from Kyle. Sunny says she lied because of how much more sexually experienced Lupe seems, which Lupe says is just an act. They agree to stop lying to each other.

Finally, Sunny and Lupe make it to Rapid City's Planned Parenthood, but are devastated to find it permanently shut down. Sunny breaks down emotionally and admits she needs her mother's help. The two drive home.

When they get back, both face altercations with their parents. Lupe is surprised by her father's concern for her. After asking him if he would ever "kick her out," he reaffirms his unconditional love for her and the two embrace. Sunny's mom is initially angry, but her mood softens after a frustrated Sunny rants about feeling the need to be perfect all the time for her. Like Lupe and her dad, the two reconnect, and Sunny admits that she needs the morning after pill, which her mom quickly buys for her.

== Cast ==
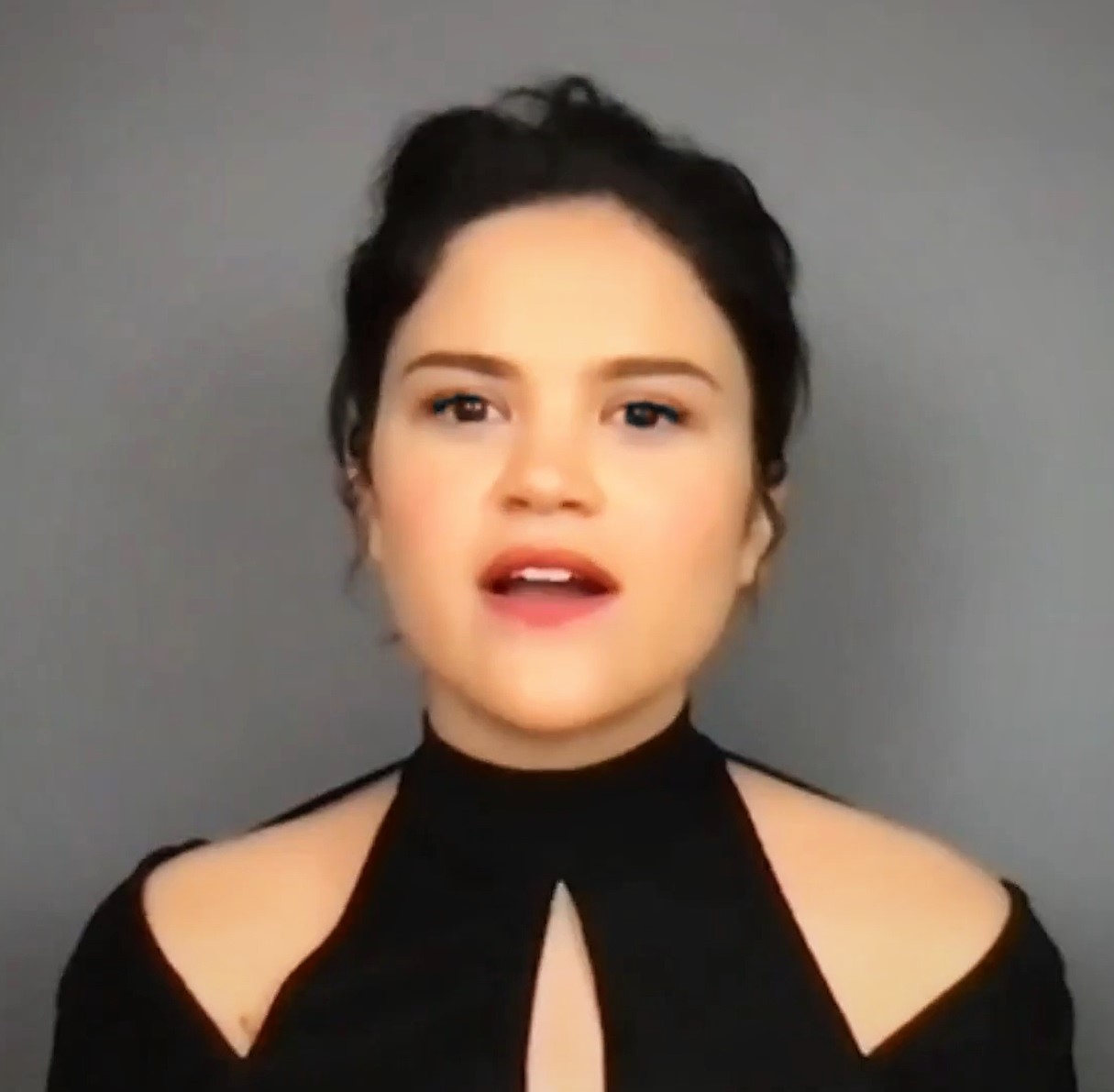
Victoria Moroles discusses Plan B in 2021

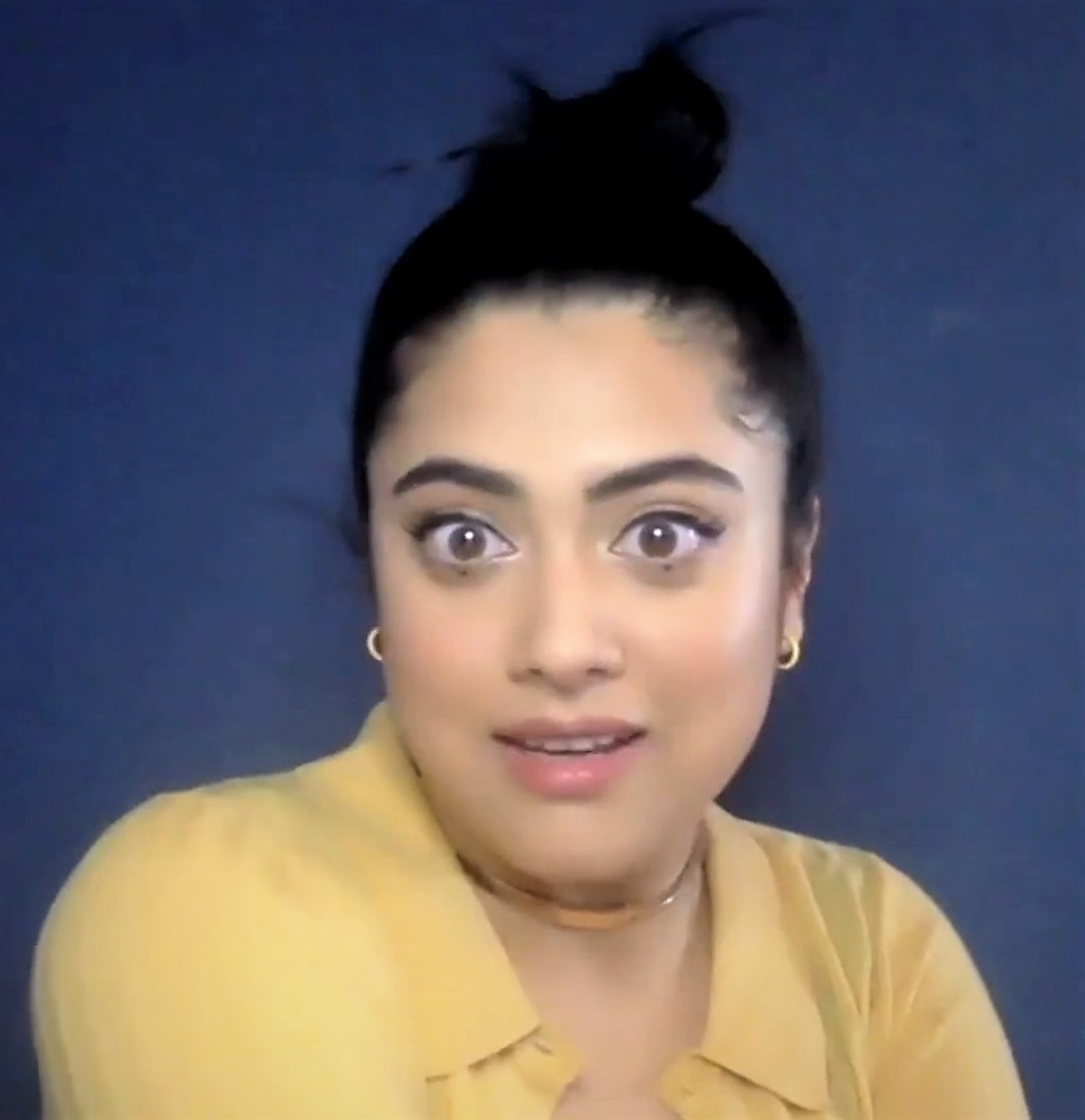
Kuhoo Verma discusses Plan B in 2021

- Victoria Moroles as Lupe
- Kuhoo Verma as Sunny
- Michael Provost as Hunter
- Mason Cook as Kyle
- Jolly Abraham as Rosie
- Jacob Vargas as Pastor Pedro
- Myha'la Herrold as Logan
- Timothy Granaderos as Xander
- Rachel Dratch as Ms. Flaucher
- Edi Patterson as Doris
- Moses Storm as Andy
- Jay Chandrasekhar as Pharmacist
- Josh Ruben as Philip
- Joseph Calveric as Lupe's brother

== Production ==
In September 2020, it was announced Natalie Morales would direct the film, from a screenplay by Prathi Srinivasan and Joshua Levy, with LD Entertainment and American High set to produce, and Hulu to distribute. In October 2020, Victoria Moroles and Kuhoo Verma joined the cast of the film.

Principal photography began on September 30, 2020, and concluded on November 10, 2020, in Syracuse, New York.

== Release ==
It was released on May 28, 2021, by Hulu. Internationally, the film was released via Star content hub on Disney+, on Star+ in Latin America, and on Disney+ Hotstar in India and Southeast Asia.

== Reception ==
=== Critical response ===
Plan B holds a 96% approval rating on review aggregator website Rotten Tomatoes, based on 53 reviews, with a weighted average of 7.3/10. The site's consensus reads, "Plan B doesn't overplay its timely message -- and it doesn't have to, thanks to a sharp, funny script and the sparkling chemistry between its charming stars". On Metacritic, the film holds a rating of 74 out of 100, based on 16 critics, indicating "generally favorable reviews".

=== Accolades ===
Year	Award	Category	Recipient(s)	Result	Ref.
2022	GLAAD Media Awards	GLAAD Media Award for Outstanding Film – Limited Release	Plan B	Nominated	
2022	Artios Awards	Outstanding Achievement in Casting - Film - Non-Theatrical Release	Jill Anthony Thomas, Kathleen Chopin, Anthony J. Kraus, Caroline Pommert-Allegrante	Nominated	
2022	Hollywood Critics Association Film Awards	Filmmaker on the Rise Award	Natalie Morales (for Plan B and Language Lessons)	Won	
