= List of awards and nominations received by Lin-Manuel Miranda =

Lin-Manuel Miranda awards and nominations
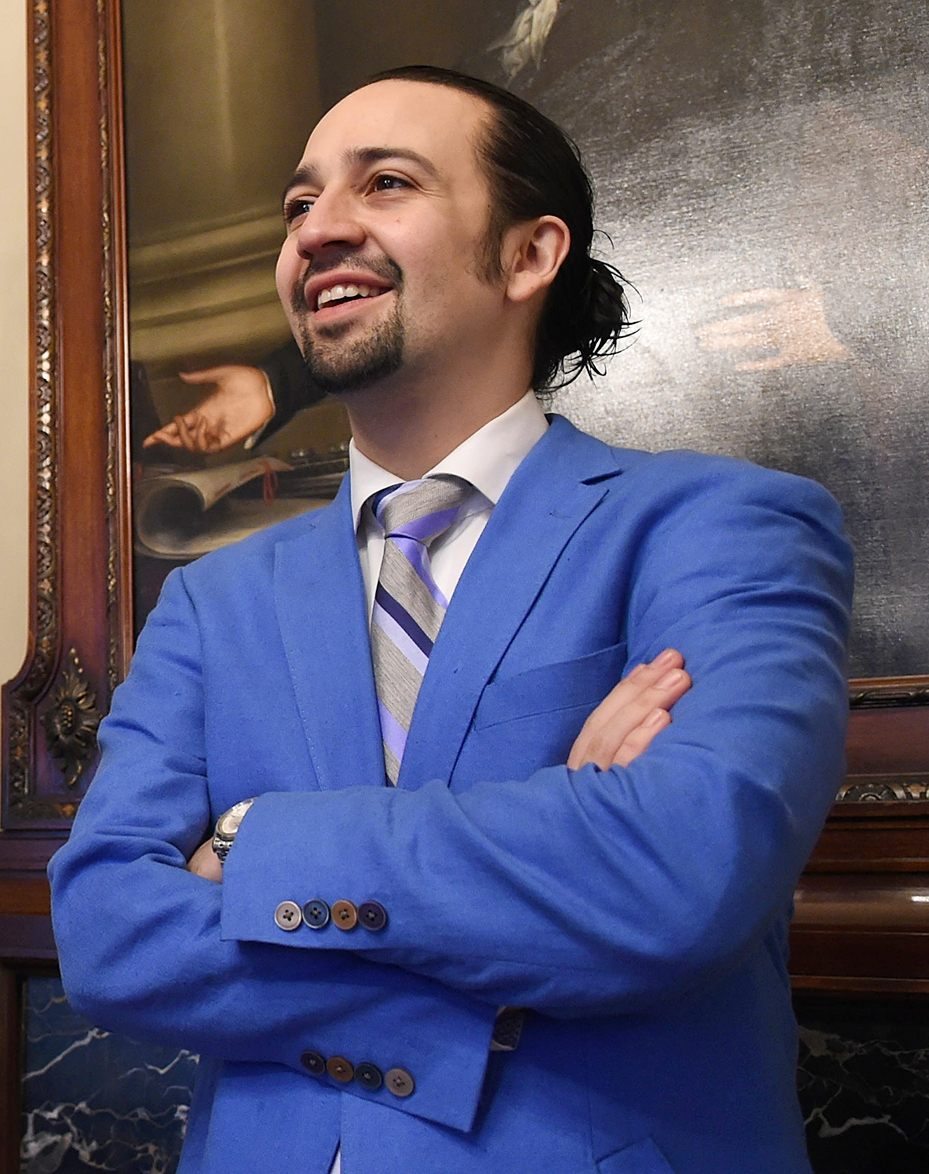
- Miranda in March 2016
Awards and nominations
Award	Wins	Nominations
Academy Awards	0	2
Annie Awards	1	2
ASCAP Film and Television Music Awards	1	1
Audie Awards	1	1
Black Reel Awards	1	3
Children's and Family Emmy Awards	1	1
Clarence Derwent Awards	1	1
Columbia University Libraries	1	1
Critics' Choice Movie Awards	0	1
Daytime Emmy Awards	0	1
Detroit Film Critics Society	1	1
Directors Guild of America Awards	0	1
Dorian Awards	1	3
Drama Desk Awards	4	8
Drama League Awards	1	3
Dramatists Guild of America	2	2
Fred and Adele Astaire Awards	0	1
Georgia Film Critics Association	0	2
GLAAD Media Awards	0	1
Golden Globes	0	4
Grammy Awards	5	9
Guild of Music Supervisors Awards	1	3
HOLA Awards	2	2
Hollywood Critics Association	1	2
Hollywood Music in Media Awards	0	7
Houston Film Critics Society	0	2
iHeartRadio Music Awards	0	1
Imagen Awards	1	1
Kids' Choice Awards	0	1
Laurence Olivier Awards	2	2
Lucille Lortel Awards	1	1
NAACP Image Awards	0	5
Obie Awards	2	2
Outer Critics Circle Awards	2	3
Palm Springs International Film Festival	1	1
People's Choice Awards	1	2
Primetime Emmy Awards	2	6
Producers Guild Awards	1	4
Pulitzer Prize	1	2
Santa Barbara International Film Festival	1	1
Satellite Awards	1	5
Saturn Awards	0	1
Society of Composers & Lyricists	0	1
St. Louis Film Critics Association	0	2
Teen Choice Awards	0	1
Theatre World Awards	1	1
Tony Awards	3	5
World Soundtrack Awards	0	1

Totals (Note: Certain award groups do not simply award one winner. They acknowledge several different recipients, have runners-up, and have third place. Since this is a specific recognition and is different from losing an award, runner-up mentions are considered wins in this award tally. For simplification and to avoid errors, each award in this list has been presumed to have had a prior nomination.)
- Wins: 45
- Nominations: 115
- Honours: 15

Lin-Manuel Miranda is an American songwriter, actor, singer, filmmaker, rapper and librettist known for creating the Broadway musicals In the Heights (2005) and Hamilton (2015) as well as his work on the films Moana (2016), Encanto (2021) and Tick, Tick... Boom! (2021).

Among his numerous accolades, Miranda has won a Pulitzer Prize, five Grammys, three Tony Awards, two Primetime Emmy Awards, and two Olivier Awards and has been nominated for two Academy Awards. In 2015, he was the recipient of a Genius Grant from the MacArthur Fellows Program. In 2016, Time magazine included Miranda in its annual Time 100 as one of the "Most Influential People in the World" and he received a star on the Puerto Rico Walk of Fame. Miranda received a star on the Hollywood Walk of Fame on November 30, 2018. In December 2018, he received the Kennedy Center Honors for creating Hamilton.

== Accolades ==
=== Awards and nominations ===
Award / Organization / Film festival	Year (Note: Indicates the year of ceremony.)	Category	Nominated work	Result	Ref(s)
Academy Awards	2017	Best Original Song	"How Far I'll Go" (from Moana)	Nominated	
Academy Awards	2022	Best Original Song	"Dos Oruguitas" (from Encanto)	Nominated	
Annie Awards	2022	Outstanding Achievement for Music in a Feature Production	Encanto	Won	
Annie Awards	2022	Outstanding Achievement for Music in a Feature Production	Vivo	Nominated	
ASCAP Film and Television Music Awards	2017	Top Box Office Films	Moana	Won	
Audie Awards	2022	Best Male Narrator	Aristotle and Dante Dive into the Waters of the World	Won	
Black Reel Awards	2021	Outstanding Television Movie or Limited Series	Hamilton	Nominated	
Black Reel Awards	2021	Outstanding Music	Hamilton	Won	
Black Reel Awards	2022	Outstanding Original Score	In the Heights	Nominated	
Children's and Family Emmy Awards	2022	Outstanding Short Form Program	We the People	Won	
Clarence Derwent Awards	2007	Outstanding Debut Performance	In the Heights	Won	
Columbia University Libraries	2016	Edward M. Kennedy Prize for Drama Inspired by American History	Hamilton	Won	
Critics' Choice Movie Awards	2022	Best Song	"Dos Oruguitas" (from Encanto)	Nominated	
Daytime Emmy Awards	2014	Outstanding Original Song	"Rhymes with Mando" (from Sesame Street)	Nominated	
Detroit Film Critics Society	2021	Best Director	Tick, Tick... Boom!	Won	
Directors Guild of America Awards	2022	Outstanding Directorial Achievement of a First-Time Feature Film Director	Tick, Tick... Boom!	Nominated	
Dorian Awards	2016	Wilde Artist of the Year	—N/a	Nominated	
Dorian Awards	2017	Wilde Artist of the Year	—N/a	Won	
Dorian Awards	2022	Wilde Artist of the Year	—N/a	Nominated	
Drama Desk Awards	2007	Outstanding Ensemble Performance	In the Heights	Won	
Drama Desk Awards	2007	Outstanding Music	In the Heights	Nominated	
Drama Desk Awards	2007	Outstanding Lyrics	In the Heights	Nominated	
Drama Desk Awards	2013	Outstanding Lyrics	Bring It On: The Musical	Nominated	
Drama Desk Awards	2015	Outstanding Actor in a Musical	Hamilton	Nominated	
Drama Desk Awards	2015	Outstanding Book of a Musical	Hamilton	Won	
Drama Desk Awards	2015	Outstanding Music	Hamilton	Won	
Drama Desk Awards	2015	Outstanding Lyrics	Hamilton	Won	
Drama League Awards	2007	Distinguished Performance	In the Heights	Nominated	
Drama League Awards	2015	Distinguished Performance	Hamilton	Nominated	
Drama League Awards	2016	Distinguished Performance	Hamilton	Won	
Dramatists Guild of America	2008	Frederick Loewe Award for Dramatic Composition	In the Heights	Won	
Dramatists Guild of America	2016	Frederick Loewe Award for Dramatic Composition	Hamilton	Won	
Fred and Adele Astaire Awards	2016	Outstanding Ensemble in a Broadway Show	Hamilton	Nominated	
Georgia Film Critics Association	2017	Best Original Song	"How Far I'll Go" (from Moana)	Nominated	
Georgia Film Critics Association	2022	Best Original Song	"Dos Oruguitas" (from Encanto)	Nominated	
GLAAD Media Awards	2013	Outstanding New York Theatre: Broadway and Off-Broadway	Bring It On: The Musical	Nominated	
Golden Globe Awards	2017	Best Original Song	"How Far I'll Go" (from Moana)	Nominated	
Golden Globe Awards	2019	Best Actor in a Motion Picture – Musical or Comedy	Mary Poppins Returns	Nominated	
Golden Globe Awards	2021	Best Actor in a Motion Picture – Musical or Comedy	Hamilton	Nominated	
Golden Globe Awards	2022	Best Original Song	"Dos Oruguitas" (from Encanto)	Nominated	
Grammy Awards	2009	Best Musical Theater Album	In the Heights	Won	
Grammy Awards	2016	Best Musical Theater Album	Hamilton	Won	
Grammy Awards	2018	Best Song Written for Visual Media	"How Far I'll Go" (from Moana)	Won	
Grammy Awards	2018	Best Compilation Soundtrack for Visual Media	Moana	Nominated	
Grammy Awards	2021	Best Music Film	We Are Freestyle Love Supreme	Nominated	
Grammy Awards	2022	Best Compilation Soundtrack for Visual Media	In the Heights	Nominated	
Grammy Awards	2023	Best Audio Book, Narration & Storytelling Recording	Aristotle and Dante Dive into the Waters of the World	Nominated	
Grammy Awards	2023	Best Compilation Soundtrack for Visual Media	Encanto	Won	
Grammy Awards	2023	Best Song Written for Visual Media	"We Don't Talk About Bruno" (from Encanto)	Won	
Guild of Music Supervisors Awards	2019	Best Song Written and/or Recording Created for a Film	"Trip a Little Light Fantastic" (from Mary Poppins Returns)	Nominated	
Guild of Music Supervisors Awards	2022	Best Song Written and/or Recording Created for a Film	"Dos Oruguitas" (from Encanto)	Won	
Guild of Music Supervisors Awards	2024	Best Song Written and/or Recorded for Television	"Esperando Pelitos" (from Big Mouth)	Nominated	
HOLA Awards	2008	Outstanding Performance by a Male Actor	In the Heights	Won	
HOLA Awards	2008	Outstanding Achievement in Playwriting	In the Heights	Won	
Hollywood Critics Association	2022	Best Director	Tick, Tick... Boom!	Nominated	
Hollywood Critics Association	2022	Best First Feature	Tick, Tick... Boom!	Won	
Hollywood Music in Media Awards	2016	Best Original Score – Animated	Moana	Nominated	
Hollywood Music in Media Awards	2016	Best Original Song – Animated	"We Know the Way" (from Moana)	Nominated	
Hollywood Music in Media Awards	2021	Best Music Themed Film, Biopic or Musical	In the Heights	Nominated	
Hollywood Music in Media Awards	2021	Best Music Themed Film, Biopic or Musical	Tick, Tick... Boom!	Nominated	
Hollywood Music in Media Awards	2023	Best Music Themed Film or Musical	The Little Mermaid	Nominated	
Hollywood Music in Media Awards	2023	Best Original Song – Sci-Fi/Fantasy	"For The First Time" (from The Little Mermaid)	Nominated	
Hollywood Music in Media Awards	2023	Best Original Song – Sci-Fi/Fantasy	"Wild Uncharted Waters" (from The Little Mermaid)	Nominated	
Houston Film Critics Society	2017	Best Original Song	"How Far I'll Go" (from Moana)	Nominated	
Houston Film Critics Society	2022	Best Original Song	"Dos Oruguitas" (from Encanto)	Nominated	
iHeartRadio Music Awards	2023	Best Lyrics	"We Don't Talk About Bruno" (from Encanto)	Nominated	
Imagen Awards	2019	Best Actor – Television	DuckTales	Nominated	
Imagen Awards	2022	Best Music Composition for Film or Television	Encanto	Won	
Kids' Choice Awards	2021	Favorite Movie Actor	Hamilton	Nominated	
Laurence Olivier Awards	2016	Outstanding Achievement in Music	In the Heights	Won	
Laurence Olivier Awards	2018	Outstanding Achievement in Music	Hamilton	Won	
Lucille Lortel Awards	2015	Outstanding Lead Actor in a Musical	Hamilton	Won	
NAACP Image Awards	2016	Outstanding Duo, Group, or Collaboration	Hamilton	Nominated	
NAACP Image Awards	2021	Outstanding Television Movie, Limited-Series or Dramatic Special	Hamilton	Nominated	
NAACP Image Awards	2021	Outstanding Writing in a Television Movie or Special	Hamilton	Nominated	
NAACP Image Awards	2022	Outstanding Directing in a Motion Picture	Tick, Tick... Boom!	Nominated	
NAACP Image Awards	2024	Outstanding Soundtrack/Compilation Album	The Little Mermaid	Nominated	
Obie Awards	2007	Music and Lyrics	In the Heights	Won	
Obie Awards	2015	Best New American Theatre Work	Hamilton	Won	
Outer Critics Circle Awards	2007	Outstanding New Score	In the Heights	Nominated	
Outer Critics Circle Awards	2015	Outstanding New Score	Hamilton	Won	
Outer Critics Circle Awards	2015	Outstanding Book of a Musical	Hamilton	Won	
Palm Springs International Film Festival	2019	Best Ensemble Cast	Mary Poppins Returns	Won	
People's Choice Awards	2020	The Male Movie Star of 2020	Hamilton	Nominated	
People's Choice Awards	2020	The Drama Movie Star of 2020	Hamilton	Won	
Primetime Emmy Awards	2014	Outstanding Original Music and Lyrics	"Bigger!" (from 67th Tony Awards)	Won	
Primetime Emmy Awards	2017	Outstanding Guest Actor in a Comedy Series	Saturday Night Live	Nominated	
Primetime Emmy Awards	2018	Outstanding Guest Actor in a Comedy Series	Curb Your Enthusiasm	Nominated	
Primetime Emmy Awards	2019	Outstanding Limited Series	Fosse/Verdon	Nominated	
Primetime Emmy Awards	2021	Outstanding Variety Special (Pre-Recorded)	Hamilton	Won	
Primetime Emmy Awards	2021	Outstanding Lead Actor in a Limited or Anthology Series or Movie	Hamilton	Nominated	
Producers Guild of America Awards	2017	Outstanding Producer of Non-Fiction Television	Hamilton's America	Nominated	
Producers Guild of America Awards	2020	Outstanding Producer of Limited Series Television	Fosse/Verdon	Nominated	
Producers Guild of America Awards	2021	Outstanding Producer of Streamed or Televised Movies	Hamilton	Won	
Producers Guild of America Awards	2022	Outstanding Producer of Theatrical Motion Pictures	Tick, Tick... Boom!	Nominated	
Pulitzer Prize	2009	Drama	In the Heights	Nominated	
Pulitzer Prize	2016	Drama	Hamilton	Won	
Santa Barbara International Film Festival	2022	Variety Artisans Award (Song)	Encanto	Won	
Satellite Awards	2019	Best Actor in a Motion Picture – Comedy or Musical	Mary Poppins Returns	Nominated	
Satellite Awards	2021	Best Actor in a Motion Picture – Comedy or Musical	Hamilton	Nominated	
Satellite Awards	2021	Best Motion Picture – Comedy or Musical	Hamilton	Nominated	
Satellite Awards	2022	Best Director	Tick, Tick... Boom!	Nominated	
Satellite Awards	2022	Best Original Song	"Colombia, Mi Encanto" (from Encanto)	Won	
Saturn Awards	2019	Best Supporting Actor	Mary Poppins Returns	Nominated	
Society of Composers & Lyricists	2022	Outstanding Original Song for a Comedy or Musical Visual Media Production	"Home All Summer" (from In the Heights)	Nominated	
St. Louis Film Critics Association	2016	Best Song	"How Far I'll Go" (from Moana)	Nominated	
St. Louis Film Critics Association	2016	Best Song	"You're Welcome" (from Moana)	Nominated	
Teen Choice Awards	2019	Choice Sci-Fi/Fantasy Movie Actor	Mary Poppins Returns	Nominated	
Theatre World Awards	2007	Outstanding Debut Performance	In the Heights	Won	
Tony Awards	2008	Best Actor in a Musical	In the Heights	Nominated	
Tony Awards	2008	Best Original Score	In the Heights	Won	
Tony Awards	2016	Best Actor in a Musical	Hamilton	Nominated	
Tony Awards	2016	Best Book of a Musical	Hamilton	Won	
Tony Awards	2016	Best Original Score	Hamilton	Won	
World Soundtrack Awards	2017	Best Original Song Written for a Film	"How Far I'll Go" (from Moana)	Nominated	

=== Special awards and other honors ===
Year	Award	Recognized work	Ref(s)
2015	MacArthur Fellowship	—N/a	
2015	George Washington Book Prize Special Achievement Award	Hamilton	
2015	Smithsonian American Ingenuity Award in the category "History"	—N/a	
2017	Imagen President's Award	—N/a	
2017	Latin Grammy President's Merit Award	—N/a	
2017	United States Capitol Historical Society Freedom Award	—N/a	
2018	Actors' Equity Association Rosetta LeNoire Award	—N/a	
2018	Kennedy Center Honor	Hamilton	
2018	Star on the Hollywood Walk of Fame in the category "Live Performance"	—N/a	
2019	National Portrait Gallery Portrait of A Nation Prize	—N/a	
2021	Critics Choice Association Celebration of Latino Cinema – Visionary Award	—N/a	
2021	Hollywood Critics Association Inspire Award	—N/a	
2022	Greenwich International Film Festival Changemaker Award	—N/a	
2022	Satellite Auteur Award	—N/a	
2026	Disney Legend Honoree	—N/a	
