= Luis A. Miranda Jr. =

Puerto Rican political strategist, philanthropist, and advocacy consultant (born 1954)

- Miranda in 2026
- Born: Luis Antonio Miranda Concepción; August 23, 1954 (age 72); Vega Alta, Puerto Rico
- Education: University of Puerto Rico (BA); New York University
- Political party: Democratic
- Spouse: Luz Towns-Miranda
- Children: 3, including Lin-Manuel
- Relatives: José Miranda (nephew)

Luis Antonio Miranda Concepción (born August 23, 1954) is a Puerto Rican political strategist, philanthropist, advocacy consultant, and author of the book Relentless: My Story of the Latino Spirit That Is Transforming America. He is the father of playwright Lin-Manuel Miranda.

== Early life ==
Miranda was born and raised in Vega Alta, Puerto Rico. He moved from Puerto Rico to New York City at 18 when he received a scholarship from New York University. He earned his Bachelor of Arts from the University of Puerto Rico and pursued graduate work in psychology at New York University.

== Career and activism ==
In the 1980s, Miranda was a special advisor for Hispanic Affairs to the Mayor of New York City Ed Koch, serving as Director of the Mayor's Office for Hispanic Affairs from 1987 to 1989. In 1989, Luis was made a part of the Board of the NYC Health and Hospitals Corporation by Mayor Koch and also served on the board under the Dinkins administration. In 1993, Miranda was appointed by Mayor Rudolph Giuliani as chairman to the Board of the NYC Health and Hospitals Corporation.

Miranda has served as a political consultant on several high-profile political campaigns, including those for Hillary Clinton and Chuck Schumer. Both in 2001 and 2005, Miranda led Fernando Ferrer's mayoral campaigns. Miranda was also a political consultant for Letitia James, the Attorney General of New York.

Miranda is a founding partner of the MirRam Group which focuses on political and advocacy consulting. Miranda was also a founder and first president of the Hispanic Federation in 1990. Miranda was also the director of field services and research at the National Action Council for Minorities in Engineering, and held leadership positions at the Community Service Society, the NYC Department of Employment, the NYC Board of Education, and Aspira of New York. He is currently the chairperson of The Broadway League's Latino audience development program, Viva Broadway. Miranda is the vice-chair of the Northern Manhattan Arts Alliance and a member of the advisory boards to Nielsen Ratings and R.Evolucion Latina.

Miranda founded the Amber Charter School in East Harlem in 2000. Miranda currently serves as the board chair of the Latino Victory Fund and as a board member of The Gilder Lehrman Institute of American History, NYC & Company, the non-profit The city, the John Jay College Foundation and The Public Theater. He is the chair for the advisory boards to the Caribbean and Latin American Studies Department at the CUNY Graduate Center.

Siempre, Luis, a documentary directed by John James, is centered on Miranda and his years of activism. The film was a 2020 Sundance Film Festival Official Selection and premiered on HBO on October 6, 2020.

In October 2021, The American Association of Political Consultants (AAPC) announced that Luis A. Miranda Jr. was recognized by the organization with the President's Award for lifetime achievement.

In 2023, Miranda supported the nomination of Hector LaSalle to the New York Court of Appeals as a member of "Latinos for LaSalle". LaSalle's nomination was defeated.

== Book ==
Miranda's memoir titled, “Relentless: My Story of the Latino Spirit that Is Transforming America” was released on May 7, 2024. In his book, Miranda shares his reflections about his upbringing in Puerto Rico, career as a political strategist and activist, and understanding the Latino voter.

== Personal life ==
Miranda is married to Luz Towns-Miranda. They have two biological children, Luz Miranda-Crespo and Lin-Manuel Miranda and one adopted son, Miguel. They reside in the Manhattan neighborhood of Washington Heights. Miranda is Catholic.

== See also ==
- List of notable Puerto Ricans
