= José Miranda (baseball) =

Puerto Rican baseball player (born 1998)

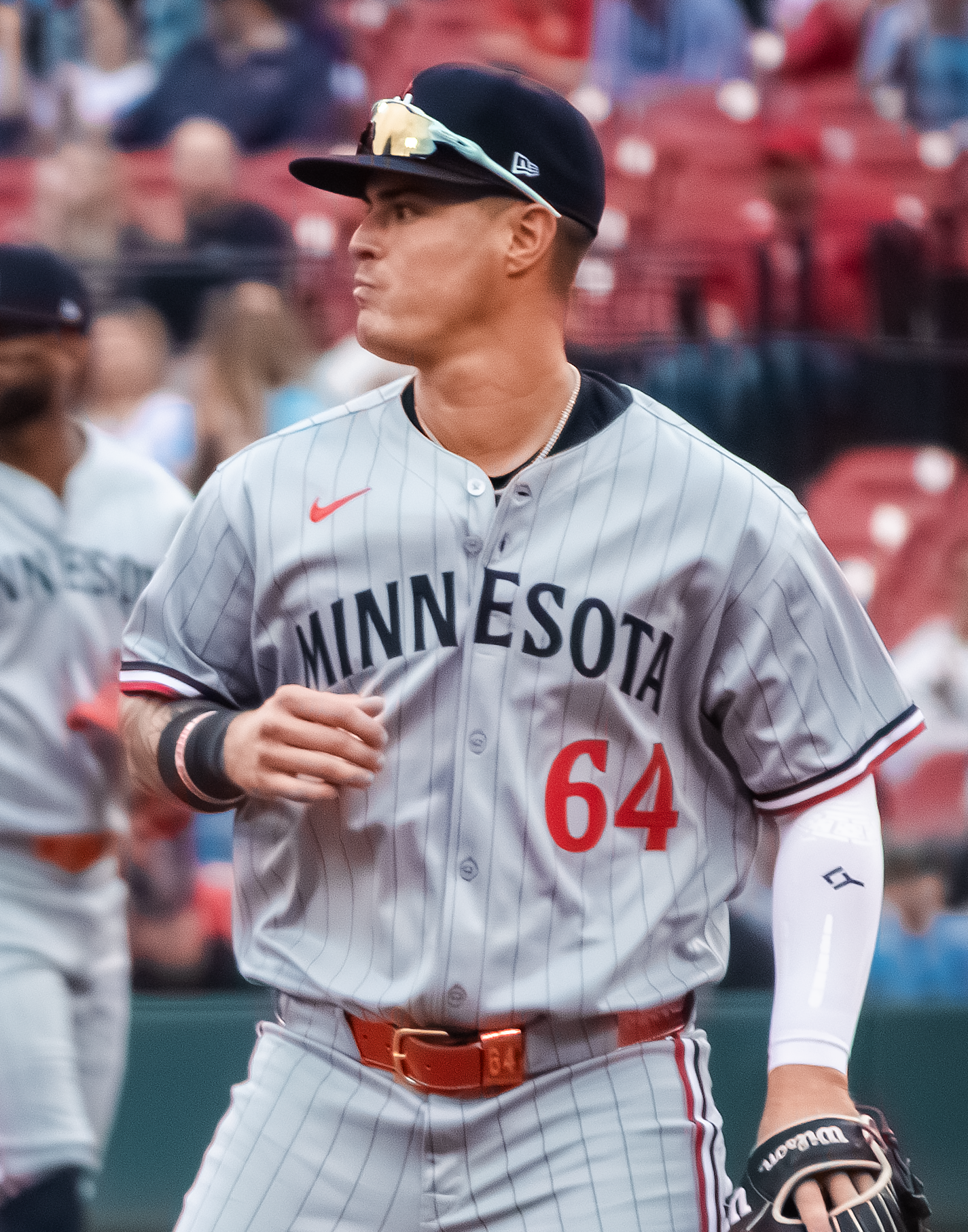
- Miranda with the Minnesota Twins in 2025

El Águila de Veracruz – No. 29
- Infielder
- Born: June 29, 1998 (age 28); Manatí, Puerto Rico
- Bats: Right Throws: Right

MLB debut
- May 2, 2022, for the Minnesota Twins

MLB statistics (through 2025 season)
- Batting average: .263
- Home runs: 28
- Runs batted in: 133
- Stats at Baseball Reference

Teams
- Minnesota Twins (2022–2025)

José Francisco Miranda (born June 29, 1998) is a Puerto Rican professional baseball infielder for El Águila de Veracruz of the Mexican League. He has previously played in Major League Baseball (MLB) for the Minnesota Twins.

== Career ==
=== Minnesota Twins ===
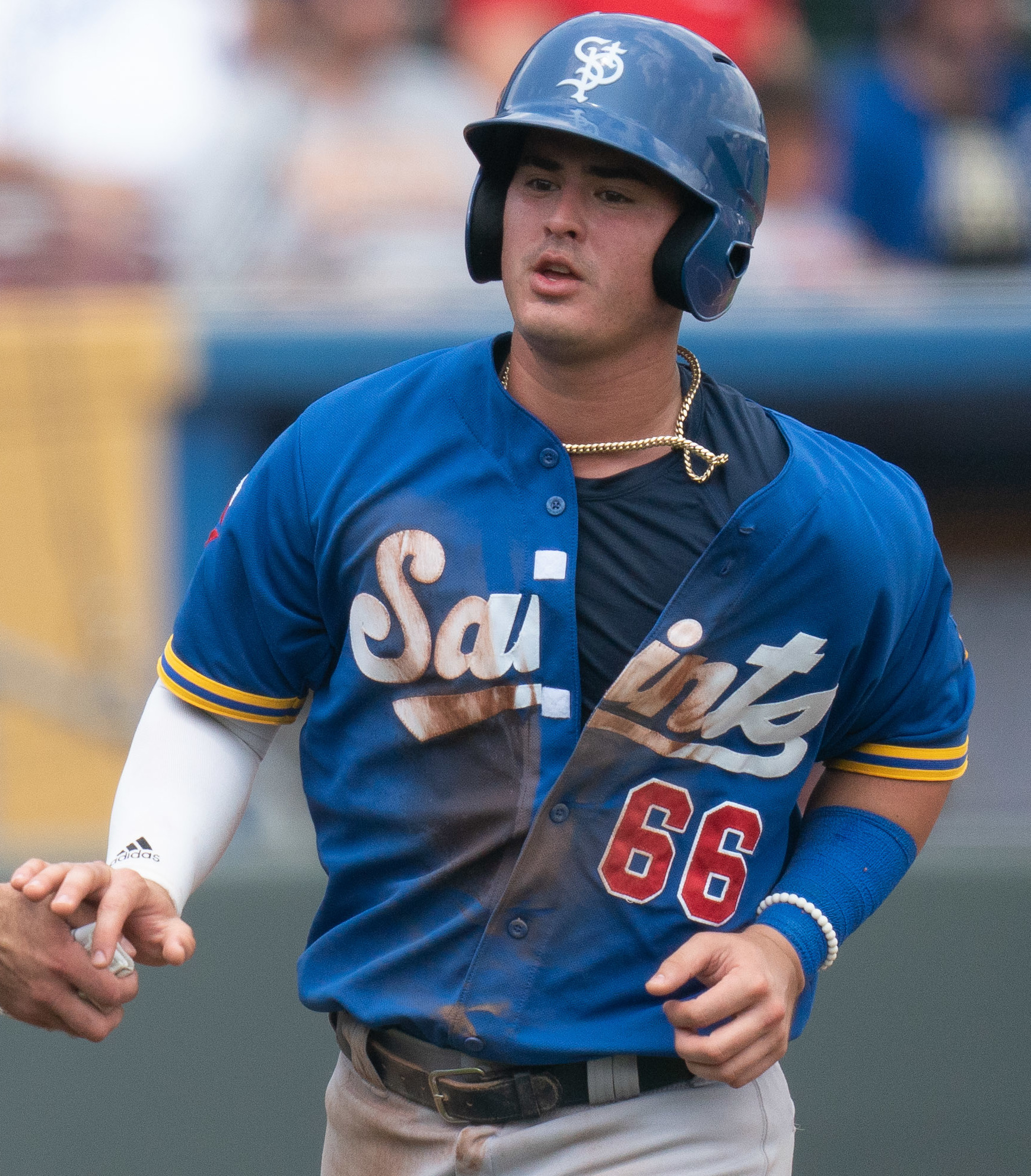
José Miranda, infielder with the St. Paul Saints (Triple-A) scores a run during a game against the Omaha Storm Chasers at Werner Park in Nebraska on July 20, 2021.

Miranda was drafted by the Minnesota Twins in the second round of the 2016 Major League Baseball draft out of Leadership Christian Academy in Guaynabo, Puerto Rico. He made his professional debut that year with the Gulf Coast Twins.

Miranda played 2017 with the Elizabethton Twins, 2018 with the Cedar Rapids Kernels and Fort Myers Miracle and 2019 with Fort Myers and the Pensacola Blue Wahoos. He did not play a game in 2020 due to the cancellation of the minor league season because of the COVID-19 pandemic. Miranda started 2021 with the Wichita Wind Surge before being promoted to the St. Paul Saints. In his first game with the Saints, he hit three home runs. That year, Miranda won the Twins Minor League Player of the Year award. He was selected to the 40-man roster following the season on November 19, 2021.

He opened the 2022 season back with St. Paul. On May 2, 2022, Miranda was called up to the major leagues for the first time and made his MLB debut that night versus the Baltimore Orioles. On May 6, Miranda hit his first career home run off of Zach Logue of the Oakland Athletics. Miranda won the rookie of the month in July where he had 13 runs, 24 hits, 2 doubles, 5 homeruns, and 19 RBI in 20 games played and slashed .353/.405/.603. Miranda started a 3–6 triple play in the fourth inning on August 22 when Texas Rangers batter Nathaniel Lowe lined out to him. Miranda then doubled Corey Seager on the first base bag and threw to shortstop Carlos Correa to put out Marcus Semien at second base.

On July 15, 2023, Miranda was placed on the injured list with a sore shoulder. The next day, he was shut down for at least a week after receiving a platelet-rich plasma injection in the same shoulder. He was transferred to the 60–day injured list on September 1. On September 13, it was announced that Miranda would undergo season–ending shoulder surgery.

Miranda was optioned to Triple–A St. Paul to begin the 2024 season. He was later recalled from Triple-A on April 8, 2024. Between July 3–6, 2024 against the Detroit Tigers and Houston Astros, Miranda had 12 hits in 12 straight at-bats, setting a franchise record, and tying a league record. In 121 total appearances for Minnesota, he slashed .284/.322/.441 with nine home runs and 49 RBI.

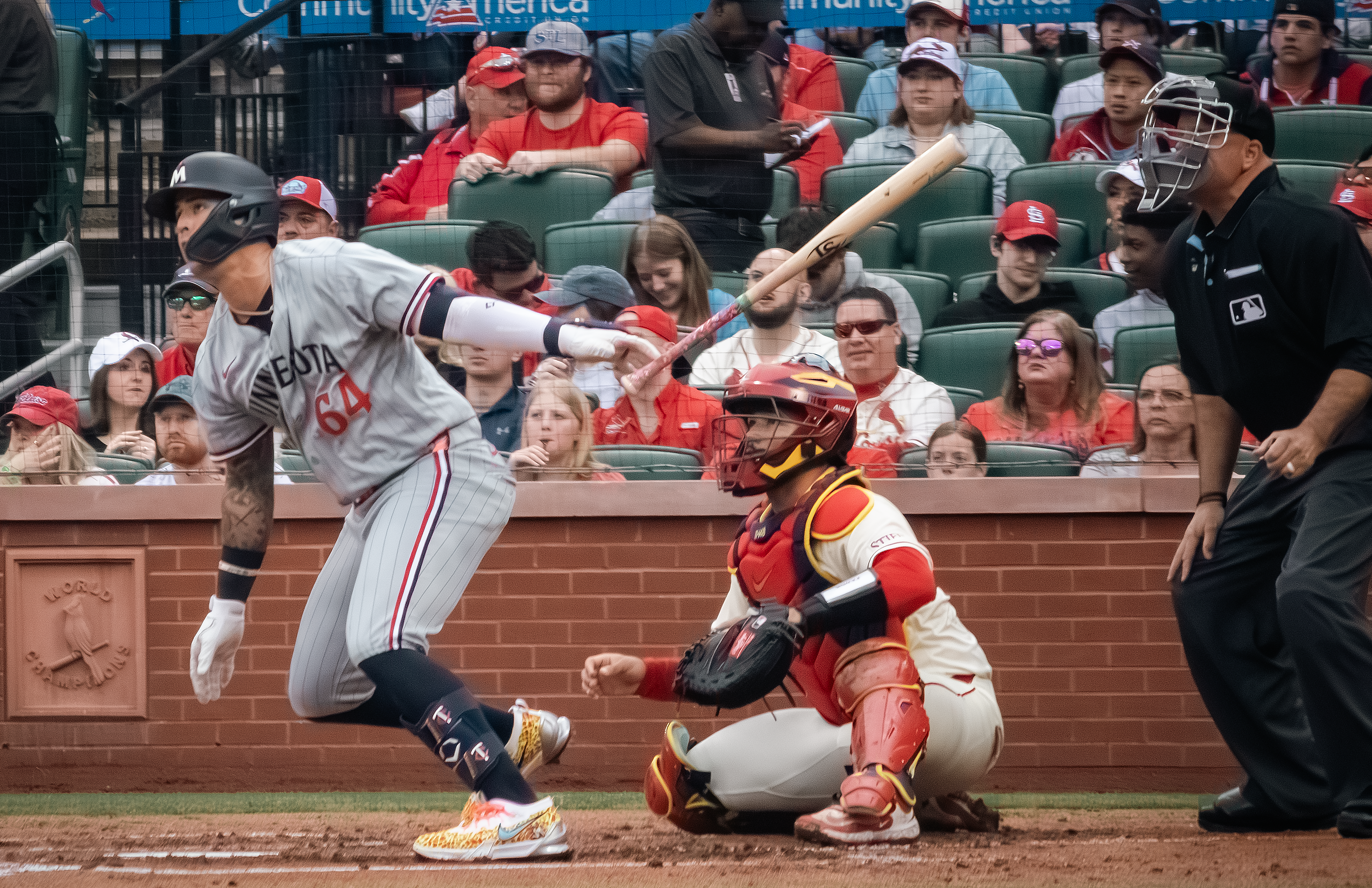
José Miranda in St.Louis, 2025.

Miranda played in 12 games for the Twins during the 2025 campaign, going 6-for-36 (.167) with one home run and five RBI. On November 6, 2025, Miranda was removed from the 40-man roster and sent outright to St. Paul; he subsequently rejected the assignment and elected free agency.

=== San Diego Padres ===
On December 19, 2025, Miranda signed a minor league contract with the San Diego Padres. He made 28 appearances for the Triple-A El Paso Chihuahuas, batting .268/.308/.482 with five home runs and 26 RBI. On May 20, 2026, Miranda was released by the Padres organization.

=== Sultanes de Monterrey ===
On July 1, 2026, Miranda signed with the Sultanes de Monterrey of the Mexican League. In 11 appearances for the Sultanes, he batted .147/.237/.147 with no home runs and three RBI. On July 16, Miranda was released by Monterrey.

=== El Águila de Veracruz ===
On July 17, 2026, Miranda signed with El Águila de Veracruz of the Mexican League.

== Personal life ==
His cousin is songwriter and actor Lin-Manuel Miranda.

== See also ==
- List of Major League Baseball players from Puerto Rico
