= Hitmaka discography =

- Studio albums: 3
- Extended plays: 1
- Singles: 10
- Music videos: 37
- Mixtapes As Albums: 25

This is the discography for producer and former rapper Hitmaka.

== Albums ==
=== Studio albums ===
Studio album, with selected chart positions
Title	Album details	Peak chart positions		
Title	Album details	US	US R&B	US Rap
Look What You Made Me	Released: August 12, 2008; Label: Yung Boss, Epic; Formats: CD, digital download	20	3	2
1-800-HIT-EAZY (with Eric Bellinger)	Released: February 12, 2021; Label: YFM, Atlantic, YFS, EMPIRE; Formats: CD, LP, digital download, streaming	—	—	—
Big Tuh	Expected: 2026; Label: YFM, Atlantic; Formats: CD, LP, digital download, streaming	To be released		

=== EP ===
Year	Album details	Peak chart positions		
Year	Album details	US	US R&B	US Rap
2007	Almost Famous: Released: July 24, 2007; Label: Yung Boss, Epic	32	5	2

=== Mixtapes ===
List of mixtapes with selected details
Title	Album details
Yung Boss Or Die Vol. 1 (Hosted by DJ Green Lantern & The Empire)	Released: April 18, 2008; Label: Yung Boss; Format: digital download
Passport Swag (Hosted by DJ Teknikz)	Released: May 19, 2008; Label: Yung Boss; Format: digital download; Retail mixtape
Yung Boss Or Die Vol. 2 (Hosted by DJ Nik Bean & The Empire)	Released: September 18, 2008; Label: Yung Boss; Format: digital download
Red Carpet Treatment (with Kidd Domination)	Released: November 8, 2008; Label: Yung Boss; Format: digital download
Yes We Can (with Kidd Domination)	Released: January 15, 2009; Label: Yung Boss; Format: digital download
Twitter Muzic Vol. 1 (Hosted by DJ Quote)	Released: April 14, 2009; Label: Yung Boss; Format: digital download
Twitter Muzic Vol. 2 (with Kidd Domination)	Released: May 12, 2009; Label: Yung Boss; Format: digital download
Back 2 Business (Hosted by DJ Ill Will)	Released: June 26, 2009; Label: Yung Boss; Format: digital download
Twitter Muzic Vol. 3 (Hosted by DJ Sean Mac)	Released: July 8, 2009; Label: Yung Boss; Format: digital download
Back 2 Business Vol. 2 (Hosted by DJ Ill Will)	Released: September 1, 2009; Label: Yung Boss; Format: digital download
The Show, The Afterparty & The Hotel (Hosted by Ray J Rob Holladay GhosttheGreat DJ Ill Will & DJ Rockstar)	Released: January 7, 2010; Label: Yung Boss; Format: digital download
Money Can't Buy Love (With K-Young &as The Dream Team) (Hosted by DJ Ill Will & DJ Rockstar Rob Holladay)	Released: May 5, 2010; Label: Yung Boss; Format: digital download
Groundwork (Hosted by DJ Woogie, Rob Holladay DJ Ill Will & DJ Rockstar)	Released: September 28, 2010; Label: Yung Boss; Format: digital download; Retail mixtape
The Love Project (Hosted by DJ Woogie)	Released: January 6, 2012; Label: Yung Fly Movement; Format: digital download
Mo Money Mo Condoms (Hosted by DJ Woogie & DJ Ill Will)	Released: July 20, 2016; Label: Yung Fly Movement; Format: digital download
Reality Check	Released: November 11, 2016; Label: Yung Fly Movement; Format: digital download

== Singles ==
=== As lead artist ===
Year	Title	Peak chart positions							Album
Year	Title	US				CAN	UK	NZ	Album
Year	Title	Hot 100	R&B	Rap	Pop	CAN	UK	NZ	Album
2007	"Sexy Lady" (featuring Junior)	18	16	6	31	—	—	—	Almost Famous EP and Look What You Made Me
2007	"Sexy Can I" (with Ray J)	3	4	—	6	20	66	10	All I Feel
2008	"Do That There" (featuring Dude 'n Nem)	—	—	124	—	—	—	—	Look What You Made Me
2008	"The Business" (featuring Casha)	33	6	5	72	—	—	26	Look What You Made Me
2010	"Sex In The City"	—	—	—	—	—	—	—	Non-album single
2019	"Thot Box" (featuring Meek Mill, 2 Chainz, YBN Nahmir, A Boogie wit da Hoodie & Tyga)	—	—	—	—	—	—	—	Big Tuh
2019	"Pack Loud" (featuring Wiz Khalifa, French Montana & Travis Scott)	—	—	—	—	—	—	—	Big Tuh
2021	"Only You" (with Eric Bellinger)	—	—	—	—	—	—	—	1-800-HIT-EAZY
2021	"Hit Eazy" (with Eric Bellinger)	—	—	—	—	—	—	—	1-800-HIT-EAZY
2021	"TRUTH HURTS" (with Eric Bellinger)	—	—	—	—	—	—	—	1-800-HIT-EAZY
2021	"Quickie" (with Queen Naija & Ty Dolla $ign)	—	—	—	—	—	—	—	Big Tuh
2022	"Down Bad" (with Fabolous & Jeremih featuring Ivory Scott)	—	—	—	—	—	—	—	Big Tuh
"—" denotes a recording that did not chart or was not released in that territory.

=== As featured artist ===
Year	Title	Album
2012	"Rock Bottom (King Los featuring Mickey Shiloh & Yung Berg)	Becoming King

== Guest appearances ==
- 2006: "Hit The Black/Slide In" – Shawnna (featuring Yung Berg)
- 2007: "Bitch Please" – Lil Wayne (featuring Yung Berg)
- 2007: "Lonely" – Collie Buddz (featuring Yung Berg)
- 2008: "Sexy Can I" – Ray J (featuring Yung Berg)
- 2008: "Karma" – Nipsey Hussle (featuring Yung Berg, Cap-1 & Question)
- 2008: "Feelin' On You" – K. Smith (featuring Yung Berg)
- 2008: "My Shawty" – Casha (featuring Yung Berg)
- 2008: "Cold (Remix)" – Alex Young (featuring Yung Berg)
- 2008: "Heels On" – Slim of 112 (featuring Yung Berg & D aka Deezo)
- 2009: "Un Poquito" – Pitbull (featuring Yung Berg)
- 2009: "Like Mine" – Kidd Domination (featuring Harlem's Cash)
- 2009: "I Do It Better" – Collie Buddz (featuring Yung Berg)
- 2009: "Go Stupid" – K-Young (featuring Yung Berg & Andre Lightskin)
- 2009: "285 (Drankin' N' Drivin) Remix" – Ludacris (featuring Yung Berg & Young Jeezy)
- 2009: "All Night Long" – Hot Dollar (featuring Pitbull, Yung Berg & K-Young)
- 2010: "Like Me" – Kay L (featuring DJ Quik & Yung Berg)
- 2010: "Out Of My Life" – Brooke Hogan (featuring Yung Berg)
- 2010: "What U Want" – Lil Scrappy (featuring Yung Berg & Stuey Rock)
- 2013: "Could It Be U" – Don Trip (featuring Yung Berg and Mia Rey)
- 2013: "Can We Kick It" – Jimi Productionz (featuring Yung Berg, Alli Davis & Dei Hamo)
- 2014: "Double Up" – DJ Infamous (featuring Yung Berg, Jeezy, Ludacris, Juicy J & The Game)

== Music videos ==
=== As lead artist ===
- 2007: "Sexy Lady" (featuring Junior)
- 2007: "Sexy Lady (Remix)" (featuring Jim Jones & Rich Boy)
- 2008: "Sexy Can I" (Ray J featuring Yung Berg)
- 2008: "Sexy Can I (2nd Version)" (Ray J featuring Yung Berg)
- 2008: "Do That There" (featuring Dude 'N Nem)
- 2008: "What It Do" (featuring J.F.K.)
- 2008: "The Business" (featuring Casha)
- 2008: "Get Money"
- 2008: "Outerspace"
- 2008: "Put It on Me"
- 2009: "Festyville"
- 2009: "6 In Tha Mornin"
- 2009: "Favorite Song"
- 2010: "Sex In The City"
- 2011: "Loving You Like Me"
- 2011: "The Cypher" (featuring Brisco, Young Chris, Ransom, Freddy P, Guyana, Ball Greezy, Ice Berg, Chad, Jordan Hollywood and Diego Cash)
- 2011: "So Amazing"
- 2011: "Derrick Rose" (featuring Marvo)
- 2011: "Burning Bridges" (featuring Sammie)
- 2012: "WPPD"
- 2012: "Redempition/Wait For You" (featuring Mia Rey and YD The Best)
- 2012: "Shawty U Can Get It" (featuring Mia Rey and Dricky Graham)
- 2014: "She's The One"
- 2015: "Masika's Interlude" (featuring Goldie)
- 2019: "Thot Box" (Dance Video) (featuring Meek Mill, 2 Chainz, A Boogie wit da Hoodie, Tyga and YBN Nahmir)
- 2019: "Thot Box" (Memoji Video) (featuring Meek Mill, 2 Chainz, A Boogie wit da Hoodie, Tyga and YBN Nahmir)
- 2019: "Thot Box" (Remix) (featuring Young MA, Dreezy, DreamDoll, Mulatto and Chinese Kitty)
- 2021: "Only You" (with Eric Bellinger)
- 2021: "Hit Eazy" (with Eric Bellinger)
- 2021: "Hype Beast" (with Eric Bellinger)
- 2021: "SERIOUS" (with Eric Bellinger)
- 2021: "Star Projectors" (with Eric Bellinger)
- 2021: "TRUTH HURTS" (with Eric Bellinger)
- 2021: "Quickie" (with Queen Naija and Ty Dolla $ign)
- 2022: "Down Bad" (with Fabolous and Jeremih featuring Ivory Scott)
- 2022: "Gunshot" (with Jim Jones featuring Beam)
- 2023: "Seen The Money" (with Jim Jones)
- 2023: "I Am" (with Jim Jones and Stefflon Don)
- 2023: "Status Update" (with Jim Jones featuring Goldiie)
- 2023: "If You Want Me to Stay" (with Jim Jones featuring Jeremih)

== Production credits ==
=== List of songs co-produced by Yung Berg/Hitmaka ===
- 2010: Lil Wayne – "John" (Polow da Don alongside Natown, Rob Holladay & Yung Berg as The Dream Team)
- 2012: Driicky Graham – "Snap Backs & Tattoos"
- 2013: Don Trip "She Want" (featuring Jae Fitz & Juicy J)
- 2013: Tamar Braxton – "The One" (K.E. on the Track alongside Yung Berg)
- 2013: Alley Boy – "Stack It Up" (Young Chop alongside Yung Berg)
- 2013: DJ Infamous – "Double Cup"
- 2014: Teairra Marí – "Deserve"
- 2014: Nicki Minaj – "Want Some More", "Favorite" (featuring Jeremih), "Shanghai"
- 2015: Yo Gotti – "Rihanna"
- 2015: Jeremih – "Giv No Fuks" (featuring Migos), "Worthy" (featuring Jhené Aiko)
- 2016: K. Michelle – "Ain't You"
- 2016: Kid Ink – "Nasty" (featuring Jeremih & Spice) (Smash David alongside Yung Berg)
- 2016: 4EY The Future – "No Time To Waste" (featuring Wale)
- 2016: Big Sean – "Bounce Back" (Smash David, Amarie Johnson, and Metro Boomin alongside Yung Berg)
- 2017: Jeremih – "I Think of You" (featuring Chris Brown and Big Sean)
- 2017: Kid Ink – "F with U" (featuring Ty Dolla $ign) (DJ Mustard and J Holt alongside Yung Berg)
- 2017: Gucci Mane – "Tone It Down" (featuring Chris Brown)
- 2017: Pia Mia – "I'm A Fan" (featuring Jeremih)
- 2017: Sevyn Streeter – "Anything You Want" (featuring Ty Dolla $ign, Jeremih and Wiz Khalifa) (RetroFuture alongside Yung Berg)
- 2017: Sevyn Streeter - "Soon as I Get Home" (RetroFuture alongside Yung Berg)
- 2017: Justine Skye – "Back For More" (featuring Jeremih) (AyoNKeys alongside Yung Berg)
- 2017: K. Michelle – "Birthday"
- 2017: Wiz Khalifa – "Something New" (featuring Ty Dolla $ign)
- 2017: Chris Brown – "Confidence" (Soundz, Cardiak and A1 alongside Yung Berg)
- 2017: Ty Dolla $ign – "Ex" (featuring YG) (Bongo ByTheWay and Ty Dolla $ign alongside Yung Berg)
- 2017: Ty Dolla $ign – "Droptop in The Rain" (featuring Tory Lanez) (Lee on the Beats alongside Yung Berg)
- 2017: Ty Dolla $ign – "Lil Favorite" (featuring MadeinTYO) (Prince Chrishan and A1 alongside Yung Berg)
- 2017: Ty Dolla $ign – "All The Time" (Johnny Stokes, A1Jovan, Prince Christian and A1 alongside Yung Berg)
- 2017: Kid Ink – "Swish" (featuring 2 Chainz) (Dre Moon and A1 alongside Yung Berg)
- 2017: Yo Gotti – "Oh Yeah" (featuring French Montana) (Ayo and Keys alongside Yung Berg)
- 2017: G-Eazy - "Crash & Burn" (featuring Kehlani) (Dakari, Rogét Chahayed, Cardiak alongside Yung Berg)
- 2018: Wiz Khalifa – "LetterMan" (808 Mafia alongside Yung Berg)
- 2018: Tinashe – "Me So Bad" (featuring French Montana and Ty Dolla $ign)
- 2018: Bri Steves – "Jealousy"
- 2018: Meek Mill – "Dangerous" (featuring Jeremih and PnB Rock)
- 2018: Ty Dolla $ign – "Pineapple" (featuring Gucci Mane and Quavo) (Cashmoney AP alongside Yung Berg)
- 2018: Tinashe – "Like I Used To"
- 2018: Tinashe – "Throw A Fit"
- 2018: The Bonfyre - "Ready To Love"
- 2018: Ty Dolla $ign – "Number"
- 2018: Ty Dolla Sign – "Simple" (featuring Yo Gotti)
- 2018: Ty Dolla $ign – "Drugs" (featuring Wiz Khalifa)
- 2018: MihTy — "The Light", "Goin Thru Some Thangz", "FYT" (featuring French Montana), "Perfect Timing", "New Level", "Take Your Time", "These Days", "Surrounded" (featuring Chris Brown and Wiz Khalifa), "Lie 2 Me" and "Ride It".
- 2018: A Boogie wit da Hoodie – "Come Closer" (featuring Queen Naija)
- 2018: G-Eazy – "1942" (featuring Yo Gotti and YBN Nahmir)
- 2018: G-Eazy – "Drop" (featuring Blac Youngsta and BlocBoy JB)
- 2018: Ty Dolla $ign – "Clout" (featuring 21 Savage)
- 2018: Ty Dolla $ign – "South Beach" (featuring Quavo and French Montana)
- 2018: Lyrica Anderson – "Rent" (featuring Blac Youngsta)
- 2018: YBN Nahmir – "Cake" (featuring Wiz Khalifa)
- 2018: PnB Rock – "ABCD (Friend Zone)"
- 2019: 2 Chainz – "Rule the World" (featuring Ariana Grande)
- 2019: K. Michelle – "Takes Two" (featuring Jeremih)
- 2019: Chris Brown – "Come Together" (featuring H.E.R.), "Emerald /Burgundy"
- 2019: Layton Greene – "Leave Em Alone" (featuring Lil Baby, City Girls and PnB Rock)
- 2019: Trouble – "She A Winner" (featuring City Girls)
- 2019: PnB Rock – "I Like Girls" (featuring Lil Skies)
- 2019: Teyana Taylor – "How You Want It?" (featuring King Combs)
- 2019: YFN Lucci – "All Night Long" (featuring Trey Songz)
- 2019: Asher Angel - "One Thought Away" (feat. Wiz Khalifa)
- 2019: Fabolous – "Choosy" (featuring Jeremih and Davido)
- 2019: DJ Pharris – "JUUG" (featuring Chief Keef and Jeremih)
- 2019: Tinashe – "Feelings"
- 2019: Tinashe – "Cash Race"
- 2019: Tinashe – "Link Up"
- 2019: King Combs – "Naughty" (featuring Jeremih)
- 2019: Fat Joe and Dre – "Hands On You" (featuring Jeremih and Bryson Tiller)
- 2019: Fat Joe and Dre – "Drive" (featuring Ty Dolla $ign and Jeremih)
- 2019: E-40 – "1 Question" (featuring Jeremih, Rick Ross and Chris Brown)
- 2019: Gucci Mane – "Hands Off" (featuring Jeremih)
- 2019: Tank – "Dirty (Remix)" (featuring Chris Brown, Feather and Rahky)
- 2019: Fabolous – "My Mind" (featuring Jacquees)
- 2019: Rubi Rose – "Hit Yo Dance" (featuring Yella Beezy and NLE Choppa)
- 2019: Tyla Yaweh - "I Think I Luv Her" (featuring YG)
- 2020: DreamDoll — "Who You Loving?" (featuring G-Eazy and Rahky)
- 2020: Tamar Braxton — "Crazy Kind of Love"
- 2020: Trey Songz — "Back Home" (featuring Summer Walker)
- 2020: O.T. Genasis — "Back To You" (featuring Chris Brown and Charlie Wilson)
- 2020: YFN Lucci — "Both of Us" (featuring Rick Ross and Layton Greene)
- 2020: YBN Nahmir - "2 Seater" (featuring G-Eazy and Offset)
- 2020: Lil Durk & King Von "Still Trappin'"
- 2020: T.I. "Pardon"
  (featuring Lil Baby)
- 2020: T.I. "Hit Dogs Holla"
  (featuring Tokyo Jetz)
- 2020: T.I. "Moon Juice"
  (featuring Snoop Dogg and Jeremih)
- 2020: T.I. "1/2 Ticket"
  (featuring London Jae and Conway the Machine)
- 2020: Lil Mosey "Jumping Out The Face"
- 2021: T.I. "Thank God"
  (featuring 21 Savage)
- 2021: Symba "Gotta Love It"
  (featuring Ty Dolla $ign)
- 2021: G-Eazy "Provide"
  (featuring Chris Brown and Mark Morrison), "Instructions"
  (featuring YG), "Now & Later"
  (featuring E-40, ShooterGang Kony & DaBoii)
- 2021: LIL XXEL "What U Want"
  (featuring Tyga and Coi Leray)
- 2021: Yung Bleu "Baddest"
  (featuring Chris Brown and 2 Chainz)
- 2021: Tink "Heat of the Moment", "Selfish"
  (with BLEU), "Chasin", "Rebel"
  (featuring Jeremih), "Regret", "Might Let You"
  (featuring Davido), "Dangerous", "FMB", "Signs (2021)",

"Have You Ever", "Mixed Feelings" & "On My Own"

- 2022: Tink "Goin Bad", "Switch", "Opposite", "Throwback", "Mine"
  (with Muni Long), "25 Reasons Interlude",

"Cum See Me"
(featuring Toosii), "Oooh Triflin"
(featuring Fabolous), "Balance", "Drunk Text'n"
(with Layton Greene), "News"
(with Russ), "Ghetto Luv"
(featuring G Herbo) & "Cum'n 2"

- 2022: Lakeyah "Mind Yo Business"
  (featuring Latto)
- 2022: Trina "Clap"
  (featuring Latto)
- 2023: Chloe Bailey "How Does It Feel"
  (featuring Chris Brown)
- 2023: Tink "Toxic"
- 2023: 2 Chainz and Lil Wayne "Transparency" (featuring Usher)
- 2023: Chris Brown - "Angel Numbers / Ten Toes", "Press Me" & "Stutter"
- 2024: Tink "Songs About U" (with Summer Walker)
- 2025: Bow Wow and Chris Brown - “Use Me”
- 2025: Tink "Can We Talk?" (featuring Bryson Tiller)
- 2025: Bryson Tiller "Last Call"
- 2025: Ludmilla "Calling Me" (featuring Luisa Sonza)

== Co-written songs ==
=== List of songs co-written by Yung Berg ===
- 2007: Fabolous – "Diamonds"
- 2012: Driicky Graham – "Snap Backs & Tattoos"
- 2013: Cassie – "Turn Up"
- 2013: T-Pain – "Bad Bitches Link-Up"
- 2014: Jason Derulo – "Kama Sutra"
- 2016: K. Michelle – "Ain't You"
- 2016: Big Sean – "Bounce Back"
- 2017: Gucci Mane – "Tone It Down"
- 2017: Justine Skye – "Back For More"
- 2017: Kid Ink – "Swish"
- 2017: Chris Brown – "Questions"
- 2018: Ty Dolla Sign – "Pineapple"
- 2018: Tinashe – "Like I Used To"
- 2018: Tinashe – "Throw a fit"
- 2018: A Boogie wit da Hoodie — "Startender"
- 2018: MihTy — "Imitate"
