= Detail production discography =

The following list is a discography of production by Noel "Detail" Fisher, an American hip hop record producer and recording artist. It includes a list of songs produced, co-produced and remixed by year, artist, album and title.

== Singles produced ==
List of singles produced, with selected chart positions and certifications, showing year released and album name
Title	Year	Peak chart positions										Certifications	Album
Title	Year	US	US R&B	US Rap	AUS	CAN	GER	IRE	NZ	SWI	UK	Certifications	Album
"Sexy Can I" (Ray J and Yung Berg)	2007	3	4	—	—	—	—	—	10	—	66	RIAA: Platinum	All I Feel and Look What You Made Me
"Gifts" (Ray J)	2008	—	65	—	—	—	—	—	—	—	—		All I Feel
"I'm So Paid" (Akon featuring Lil Wayne and Young Jeezy)	2008	31	47	—	15	—	—	—	—	—	59	RIAA: Platinum	Freedom
"Endz" (O'Mega Red featuring Detail)	2010	—	—	—	—	—	—	—	—	—	—		The Redtape Vol.3
"Tattoo Girl (Foreva)" (Detail featuring T-Pain, Lil Wayne and Travie McCoy)	2010	—	—	—	—	—	—	—	—	—	—		non-album singles
"SMH (Shakin' My Head)" (Detail featuring Flo Rida)	2010	—	—	—	—	—	—	—	—	—	—		non-album singles
"How to Love" (Lil Wayne)	2011	5	2	2	58	20	97	—	24	67	48	RIAA: 4× Platinum	Tha Carter IV
"Sweat" (Bow Wow featuring Lil Wayne)	2011	48	104	—	—	—	—	—	—	—	—		non-album singles
"I'm a Problem" (O'Mega Red featuring Detail)	2012	—	—	—	—	—	—	—	—	—	—		non-album singles
"Ice" (Kelly Rowland featuring Lil Wayne)	2012	88	24	—	—	—	—	—	—	—	—		non-album singles
"Show You" (Tyga featuring Future)	2013	—	56	—	—	—	—	—	—	—	—		Hotel California
"No Worries" (Lil Wayne featuring Detail)	2013	29	7	7	—	—	—	—	—	—	—		I Am Not a Human Being II
"Tapout" (Rich Gang featuring Lil Wayne, Birdman, Mack Maine, Nicki Minaj and Future)	2013	44	10	8	—	—	134	—	—	—	—		Rich Gang
"Ready" (B.o.B featuring Future)	2013	105	37	—	—	—	—	—	—	—	—		Underground Luxury
"Drunk in Love" (Beyoncé featuring Jay-Z)	2013	2	1	—	22	23	70	10	7	40	9	ARIA: Gold; RMNZ: Gold	Beyoncé
"We Dem Boyz" (Wiz Khalifa)	2014	43	10	4	—	—	—	—	—	—	—		Blacc Hollywood
"Lookin Ass" (Nicki Minaj)	2014	104	28	16	—	—	—	—	—	—	—		Young Money: Rise of an Empire
"I Luh Ya Papi" (Jennifer Lopez featuring French Montana)	2014	77	—	—	—	78	—	—	—	—	170		A.K.A.
"Pretend" (Tinashe featuring ASAP Rocky)	2014	117	34	—	—	—	—	—	—	—	—		Aquarius
"Selfish" (Future featuring Rihanna)	2017	37	13	—	37	28	—	78	17	51	25	ARIA: Gold; MC: Gold; RMNZ: Gold; RIAA: Gold	HNDRXX
"Make Love" (Gucci Mane and Nicki Minaj)	2017	78	33	22	—	—	—	—	—	—	—		Mr. Davis
"Changed It" (Nicki Minaj and Lil Wayne)	2017	71	29	18	—	—	116	—	—	—	—		non-album single
"No Pressure" (French Montana featuring Future)	2017	—	—	—	—	—	—	—	—	—	—		Jungle Rules
"—" denotes a recording that did not chart or was not released in that territory.

== 2005 ==
=== Ray J – Raydiation ===
- 01. "Raydiation (Intro)"
- 06. "Blue High Heels" (produced with Ray J)
- 07. "Melody"
- 09. "Quit Actin" (featuring R. Kelly & Shorty Mack)
- 10. "Exotic"
- 12. "Sexy" (featuring Mýa)
- 13. "In The Mood"
- 14. "Anytime"
- 15. "Centerview" (produced with Ray J)

=== Various artists – Roll Bounce (soundtrack) ===
- 05. "Quit Actin'" (R. Kelly & Ray J feat. Shorty Mack)

== 2007 ==
=== Bone Thugs-N-Harmony – T.H.U.G.S. ===
- 01. T.H.U.G.S.
- 03. "Nation Of Thugs"
- 04. "Wildin'"
- 08. "Sweet Jane"
- 10. "Don't Waste My Time"
- 11. "Young Thugs"
- 13. "So Many Places"

=== Mýa – Liberation ===
- 05. "No Touchin'"

== 2008 ==
=== Ray J – All I Feel ===
- 03. "Sexy Can I" (featuring Yung Berg)
- 04. "Gifts"
- 09. "It's Up To You"

=== Yung Berg – Look What You Made Me ===
- 03. "Sexy Can I" (with Ray J)

=== Marvin Winans Jr – Image of a Man ===
- 08. "U Know Love"

=== Akon – Freedom ===
- 06. "I'm So Paid" (featuring Lil' Wayne & Young Jeezy) (Produced with Akon)
- 11. "Birthmark" (Produced with Akon & Giorgio Tuinfort)
- 13. "Freedom" (Produced with Akon & Giorgio Tuinfort)
- 14. "I'm So Paid (Remix)" (featuring Lil' Wayne) (iTunes Bonus Track)

== 2009 ==
=== Hussein Fatal – Thugtertainment Soldiers ===
- 06. "Something Bout This Money"

=== Ray J – For the Love of Ray J ===
- 12. "Sexy Can I (Remix)" (featuring Sheek Louch)

=== Tha Realest – Witness Tha Realest ===
- 14. "Get It N"

=== Sean Kingston – Tomorrow ===
- 11. "Shoulda Let U Go" (featuring Good Charlotte) (produced with DJ Frank E & Drum Up)

=== Down AKA Kilo – Cholo Skate ===
- 03. "Certified Boss" (featuring DJ Quik & Detail)
- 09. "Her 2 Step" (featuring Detail)

== 2010 ==
=== O'Mega Red – The Redtape Vol.3 ===
- 04. "She Luvs It" (featuring Detail)
- 09. "Endz" (featuring Detail)

=== Lil Jon – Crunk Rock ===
- 11. "Get In Get Out" (produced with Lil Jon & Catalyst)

=== Travie McCoy – Lazarus ===
- 11. "Ms. Tattoo Girl" (featuring T-Pain) (Deluxe Edition bonus track)

=== Good Charlotte – Cardiology ===
- 13. "There She Goes"

== 2011 ==
=== New Boyz – Too Cool to Care ===
- 06. "Magazine Girl" (produced with H-Money)

=== Lil Wayne – Tha Carter IV ===
- 12. "How to Love" (produced with Drum Up)

Leftover

- "I Hate Love"

=== Romeo Santos – Formula, Vol. 1 ===
- 14. "All Aboard" (featuring Lil Wayne) (produced with RedOne and Taio Cruz)

=== T-Pain – RevolveR ===
- 02. "Bottlez" (featuring Detail)

=== Bow Wow ===
- 00. "Sweat" (featuring Lil Wayne) (produced with Bei Maejor)

== 2012 ==
=== Kelly Rowland ===
- 00. "Ice" (featuring Lil Wayne)

=== DJ Khaled – Kiss the Ring ===
- 09. "I Don't See 'Em" (featuring Birdman, Ace Hood & 2 Chainz)

=== Gucci Mane – Trap God ===
- 20. "Get Lost" (featuring Birdman)

=== Nelly – Scorpio Season ===
- 04. "Girl Drop That" (featuring Detail)
- 10. "Type of Shit I Be On"

== 2013 ==
=== Tyga – Hotel California ===
- 08. "Show You" (featuring Future)

=== Lil Wayne – I Am Not a Human Being II ===
- 02. "Curtains" (featuring Boo)
- 05. "No Worries" (featuring Detail)
- 12. "Romance"

=== Rich Gang – Rich Gang ===
- 02. "Million Dollar" (featuring Detail & Future)
- 03. "Tapout" (featuring Lil Wayne, Birdman, Mack Maine, Nicki Minaj & Future)
- 07. "Bigger Than Life" (featuring Chris Brown, Tyga, Birdman & Lil Wayne)
- 08. "100 Favors" (featuring Detail, Birdman & Kendrick Lamar)
- 10. "Burn the House" (featuring Detail)
- 13. "Sunshine" (featuring Limp Bizkit, Flo Rida, Birdman & Caskey)

=== Drake – Nothing Was the Same ===
- 05. "Own It"
- 11. "305 to My City" (featuring Detail)
- 13. "Paris Morton Music 2"

=== Nelly – M.O. ===
- 02. "Give U Dat" (featuring Future)
- 04. "Heaven" (featuring Daley)
- 06. "100K" (featuring 2 Chainz)

=== B.o.B – Underground Luxury ===
- 04. "Ready" (featuring Future)

=== Beyoncé – Beyoncé ===
- 03. "Drunk in Love" (featuring Jay-Z)
- 07. "Jealous"

== 2014 ==
=== Mario ===
- "Dodge the Bullet"

=== Future ===
- "I Be U"
- "Good Morning"

=== Ashanti – Braveheart ===
- 04. "Count"

=== Various artists – Young Money: Rise of an Empire ===
- 08. "Lookin Ass" (performed by Nicki Minaj)

=== Soulja Boy – Super Dope ===
- 09. "Fuck That Flo" (featuring Busta Rhymes)

=== Jennifer Lopez – A.K.A. ===
- 04. "I Luh Ya Papi" (featuring French Montana)
- 09. "Worry No More" (featuring Rick Ross)

=== Wiz Khalifa – Blacc Hollywood ===
- 02. "We Dem Boyz"

=== Tinashe – Aquarius ===
- 08. "Pretend" (featuring ASAP Rocky)

=== Nicki Minaj – The Pinkprint ===
- 20. "Mona Lisa"
- 21. "Put You in a Room"
- 20. "Wamables"

== 2015 ==
=== Mila J – The Waiting Game ===
French Montana – Casino Life 2: Brown Bag Legend

- 05. "Yay Yay"

Ray J and Lil Wayne – "Brown Sugar"

Sanaa Lathan Featuring Dej Loaf – "Emotional"

Big Sean Feat Detail and Pharrell – "What A Year"

== 2016 ==
=== Twenty88 – Twenty88 ===
- 05. "2 Minute Warning" (featuring Detail and K-Ci & JoJo)

== 2017 ==
=== Big Sean – I Decided. ===
- 12. "Inspire Me"

=== Future – HNDRXX ===
- 02. "Comin Out Strong" (featuring The Weeknd)
- 04. "Damage"
- 05. "Use Me"
- 08. "Fresh Air"
- 09. "Neva Missa Lost"
- 15. "Selfish" (featuring Rihanna)

=== Nicki Minaj & Lil Wayne ===
- "Changed It"

=== French Montana – Jungle Rules ===
- 10. "No Pressure" (featuring Future)

=== Miguel – War & Leisure ===
- 02. "Pineapple Skies"
