= Visionland (album) =

Studio album by YBN Nahmir
- Released: March 26, 2021
- Length: 48:53
- Label: Art@War; Atlantic
- Producer: Ashton Woodench; Bankroll Got It; Boe; Breezy Streets; Diego Ave; Drifty JB; Hendrix; GNP Beats; Go Grizzly; Hitmaka; HoodRixh; Jima Beats; John Lam; Kilo Keys; LR Beats; Madebykhwezi; Mannie II; Milan Modi; Mike Mixer; RJ; SantanaStarBeats; Saint Mino; Smash David; The Orphanage; YvngStreet

YBN Nahmir chronology
YBN: The Mixtape (2018)	Visionland (2021)

Singles from Visionland
- 1. "Opp Stoppa" Released: June 10, 2019; 2. "2 Seater" Released: March 19, 2020; 3. "Wake Up" Released: November 19, 2020; 4. "Fast Car Music (Stain)" Released: March 12, 2021

Visionland is the debut studio album by American rapper YBN Nahmir. The album was released on March 26, 2021, by Atlantic Records and Art@War, and features guest appearances from 21 Savage, Ty Dolla Sign, G Herbo, G-Eazy, Offset, E-40, Too Short, FatBoy SSE, and DaBoii. The album was critically panned and failed to chart in any territory and reportedly sold 4,000 copies in its first week of release in the United States.

== Release and promotion ==
On September 1, 2020, YBN Nahmir announced the album's title, announcing that it would be released on his 21st birthday, December 18, 2020. It was delayed for unknown reasons, but he then announced its cover art and release date along with the pre-order.

== Singles ==
YBN Nahmir released "Opp Stoppa" as the lead single from the album on June 10, 2019. It was followed up nine months later with the second single, "2 Seater", featuring fellow American rappers G-Eazy and Offset, on March 19, 2020. Eight months later, "Wake Up" was released as its third single on November 20, 2020. Nahmir then released the remix of "Opp Stoppa", which features fellow American rapper 21 Savage, on January 22, 2021. The final single, "Fast Car (Stain)", was released on March 12, 2021.

== Critical reception ==
Professional ratings
Review scores
Source	Rating
Pitchfork	5.3/10

Dylan Green of Pitchfork gave Visionland a rating of 5.3 out of 10, saying that "[Nahmir]'s missing the punchy enthusiasm of Flo Milli, the melodic sharpness of NoCap, or the vivid stoicism of OMB Peezy and brings little else to the table". He gave positive comments about the album's first track, calling it "one of Nahmir's best".

== Track listing ==
Visionland track listing
No.	Title	Writer(s)	Producer(s)	Length
1.	"Still (Family)" (with Ty Dolla Sign)	Nicholas Simmons; Tyrone Griffin, Jr.; Steve Harvey; Bobby Watson; Balewa Muhammad; Derrick Domingo, Jr.; Mary Brown	LR Beats	3:46
2.	"Regardless"	N. Simmons; Alejandro Suarez; Mino Drerup	Weskillinit; Saint Mino	2:08
3.	"Politics" (featuring G Herbo and DaBoii)	N. Simmons; Herbert Wright III; Wayman Barrow, Jr.; Reyes M. Gonsalves; Christian	GNP Beats	5:03
4.	"Opp Stoppa" (featuring 21 Savage)	N. Simmons; Shayaa Abraham-Joseph; Ashton Woodench	Woodench	2:15
5.	"Get It Crackin"	N. Simmons; Joel Banks; Taylor Banks; Dievo Avendano	Bankroll Got It; Diego Ave	2:20
6.	"Fast Car Music (Stain)"	N. Simmons; Adroaldo de Santana, Jr.	SantanaStarBeats	1:50
7.	"Prison"	N. Simmons; Moses McGee	HoodRixh	2:00
8.	"Lamb Truck"	N. Simmons; John Lam; Kevin Webb; Jackson Bowman	Lam; Hendrix; Boe	1:28
9.	"Fast Car Ending"	N. Simmons; Emmanuel Iledare; Kevin Kusi	Mannie II; Jima Beats	1:16
10.	"Wake Up"	N. Simmons; Donnie Katana; Iledare; Michael McWhite; Daniel Rosenfield	Katana; Mannie II^{[a]}; Mike Mixer^{[a]}	2:04
11.	"Belgium"	N. Simmons; Rayshawn Gordon; Christian	RJ	2:10
12.	"Make a Wish"	N. Simmons; Jordan Streeter	YvngStreet	2:42
13.	"Homework"	N. Simmons; Vu Dieu	Foreign Vu	2:17
14.	"Streets"	N. Simmons; Brain Anamayatana; Milan Modi; David Paich	Kilo Keys; Modi^{[a]}	1:50
15.	"WooWAM"	N. Simmons; Brandon Streeter; Paul Jones II	Breezy Streets	1:58
16.	"Soul Train"	N. Simmons; William Simmons; Khwezi Sifunda; Trevor Brown	MadebyKhwezi; The Orphanage	2:15
17.	"2 Seater" (featuring G-Eazy and Offset)	N. Simmons; Gerald Gillum; Kiari Cephus; Samuel Jimenez; Kevin Price; Christian Ward	Smash David; Go Grizzly; Hitmaka	3:50
18.	"Cashland" (featuring E-40 and Too Short)	N. Simmons; Earl Stevens; Todd Shaw; Gordon; Christian	RJ	3:35
19.	"Over Now" (featuring FatBoy SSE)	N. Simmons; Tyriq Kimbrough; Jalen Butler; Christian	Drifty JB	2:54
20.	"Opp Stoppa"	N. Simmons; Woodench	Woodench	1:05
Total length:				48:53

Notes

- ^{^[a]} signifies an additional producer.

== Personnel ==
Musicians

- YBN Nahmir – primary artist
- Ty Dolla Sign – primary artist (1)
- G Herbo – featured artist (3)
- DaBoii – featured artist (3)
- 21 Savage – featured artist (4)
- G-Eazy – featured artist (17)
- Offset – featured artist (17)
- E-40 – featured artist (18)
- Too Short – featured artist (18)
- FatBoy SSE – featured artist (19)

Technical

- Thomas "Tillie" Mann – mixing (1–16, 18–20)
- Dave Kutch – mastering
- Rafael "Fai" Bautista – engineering (1)
- Kyla Moscovich – background vocals (1)
- LR Beats – programming (1)
- Ben "Ben Great" Phillips – engineering (2, 10, 13, 18)
- Weskillinit – programming (2)
- Saint Mino – programming (2)
- GNP Beats – programming (3)
- Ashton Woodench – programming (4, 20)
- Bankroll Got It – programming (5)
- Diego Ave – programming (5)
- Eric Klem – recording (5)
- SantanaStar Beats – programming (6)
- Iledare – recording (6–9, 12, 14, 15)
- HoodRixh – programming (7)
- John Lam – programming (8)
- Hendrix – programming (8)
- Boe – programming (8)
- Mannie II – programming (9)
- Jima Beats – programming (9)
- RJ – programming (11, 18)
- YvngStreet – programming (12)
- Foreign Vu – programming (13)
- Kilo Keys – programming (14)
- Breezy Streets – programming (15)
- MadebyKhwezi – programming (16)
- The Orphanage – programming (16)
- Jaycen Joshua – mixing (17)
- Smash David – programming (17)
- Go Grizzly – programming (17)
- Hitmaka – programming (17)
- Darz – drum programming (18)
- Drifty JB – programming (19)
