= B96 Pepsi SummerBash =

Annual concert in Illinois, United States

- The official logo for the 2016 event
- Genre: Pop, hip-hop
- Locations: Rosemont, Illinois (2016)
- Years active: 1992-2019, 2021-present
- Founders: WBBM-FM
- Attendance: N/A
- Website: b96.cbslocal.com/summerbash/

The B96 Pepsi SummerBash is an annual concert typically held on a Saturday in June, in the Chicago area. First held in 1992 and presented by Chicago radio station B96, the concert has been title-sponsored by Pepsi in recent years. In 2016, the event was held at Allstate Arena in the suburb of Rosemont. Previously, the event was held at Toyota Park in Bridgeview from 2006 to 2015. In 2006, the SummerBash was the first non-soccer event held at the stadium. Other venues that have played host to the event include the First Midwest Bank Amphitheater in Tinley Park, Joliet Raceway, and Maywood Park, all in the suburban Chicago area. Noted for featuring several marquee performers in a day-long series of sets, the event is considered to be one of the premier annual radio station concerts in the U.S. by many in the radio industry, along with events such as the 102.7 KIIS-FM's Jingle Ball, Wango Tango, Z100's Jingle Ball, and rock station 105.7 The Point - St. Louis' Point Fest. The success of the annual SummerBash concerts allowed the station to also begin a holiday variation of the event called the B96 Jingle Bash.

There was no concert in 2020.

== 2006 ==
2006 was the first year in which the SummerBash was held at Toyota Park. Held on June 24, the lineup included performances from Mary J. Blige, Sean Paul, P!nk, Rihanna, T-Pain, Ne-Yo, and Ray J.

== 2007 ==
In 2007, SummerBash was held on Saturday, June 14 at Toyota Park. The headlining act was Akon, supported by acts such as Rihanna, T-Pain, Ciara, Ne-Yo, and Hilary Duff.

Other artists appearing at the 2007 SummerBash included MIMS, Gym Class Heroes, Paula DeAnda, and Dude 'n Nem. The 2007 edition of SummerBash was marred by several notable incidents, including a disturbance in the stands and between set performances that one critic described as "repetitive" and "like listening to a broken record", as well as short set lengths by both Rihanna and Akon, the latter despite being the event's headlining act.

== 2008 ==
2008 saw the event return to its previous date of the second Saturday in June, this time occurring on June 14. On an 83-degree day in Bridgeview, artists such as Natasha Bedingfield, Flo Rida, Cascada, Pitbull, Jesse McCartney, Danity Kane, and Ray J all provided supporting roles for headlining artist, T-Pain.

== 2009 ==
The 2009 SummerBash was held on Saturday, June 13, again at Toyota Park. Featured acts included Akon, Kelly Clarkson, LMFAO, the Black Eyed Peas, and Flo Rida.

The 2009 event gained extra attention on a national level when The Price is Right featured tickets to the event as one of the prizes in its "Showcase Showdown" grand prize game at the end of the show.

== 2010 ==
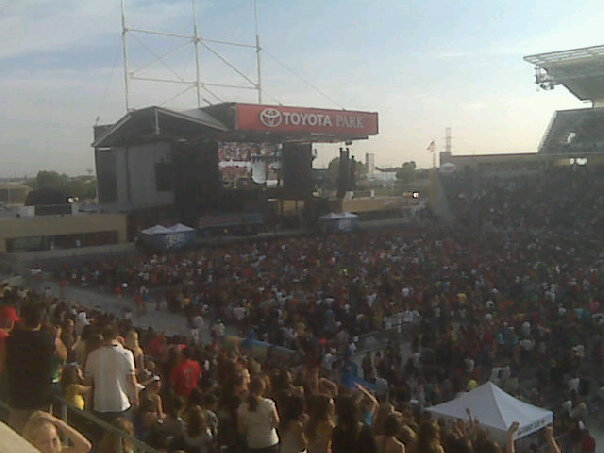
The concert stage at Toyota Park, as seen during the 2010 B96 Pepsi Summer Bash

Held on June 12 at Toyota Park, the 2010 SummerBash featured performances by Charice, JLS, Travis Garland, B.o.B, Taio Cruz, Cascada, New Boyz, Jason Derulo, Iyaz, T-Pain, and Ludacris. Celebrity blogger Perez Hilton was a guest host, as was Kevin Frazier from E!.

== 2011 ==
Held on June 11 at Toyota Park, the 2011 SummerBash featured performances by Joe Jonas, Far East Movement, Lupe Fiasco, Jay Sean, Big Time Rush, Keri Hilson, New Boyz, Chris Brown, and Pitbull.

== 2012 ==
Held on June 16, the 2012 SummerBash featured performances by Big Time Rush, The Wanted, Karmin, Austin Mahone, Sean Paul, Flo Rida, Gym Class Heroes, Mike Posner, Kat Graham, Havana Brown (musician), and Dev (singer).

== 2013 ==
Held on June 15, the 2013 SummerBash featured performances by Avicii, Zedd, Avril Lavigne, Demi Lovato, Macklemore & Ryan Lewis, Timeflies, Ne-Yo, Afrojack, Cher Lloyd and a special guest host appearance by Miley Cyrus. Surprise guests Krewella, Mike Posner, and Sammy Adams showed up as replacements for Ariana Grande, who was originally on the performance roster.

== 2014 ==
The 2014 SummerBash, held at Toyota Park on June 14, featured performances by Jennifer Lopez, Pitbull, Jason Derulo, Austin Mahone, Iggy Azalea, Icona Pop, Little Mix, Hot Chelle Rae, and G.R.L.

== 2015 ==
In 2015, the event was held at Toyota Park on June 20, featuring performances by Usher, Zedd, Nick Jonas, Flo Rida, Walk the Moon, Fifth Harmony, R5, Tove Lo, Natalie La Rose, Jake Miller, and Olly Murs.

== 2016 ==
The 2016 SummerBash was held in Allstate Arena on June 26. The lineup included Ariana Grande, Calvin Harris, Meghan Trainor, Bebe Rexha, Charlie Puth, Mike Posner, and Daya. Bebe Rexha filled in for Iggy Azalea as she was overseas for a business venture. Frankie performed at the festival before the SummerBash.

== 2017 ==
The 2017 SummerBash was held in the Allstate Arena on June 24. The lineup included Niall Horan, Kygo, Zedd, Camila Cabello, Jason Derulo, Hailee Steinfeld, Dua Lipa, Noah Cyrus, Cheat Codes, and Liam Payne as the very "special guest performer".

== 2018 ==
The 2018 event was held at the Allstate Arena on June 23 and featured performances by Halsey, Alessia Cara, Meghan Trainor, Bebe Rexha, Dua Lipa, 5 Seconds of Summer, Why Don't We, Liam Payne, and Bazzi.
