= Two-seater =

Two-seater or two-seat may refer to:

- a vehicle with two seats, usually one for the driver and one for a passenger
  - an aircraft with two seats, such as many trainers, fighters, gliders, and helicopters
  - a coupé, an automobile with usually two seats
    - a coupé with a 2+2 style, with two normal size seats in the front and two smaller seats in the back intended to be used occasionally or for children
  - a microcar designed for urban use and space optimisation like the vehicles registered in the L7e category.
  - a motorcycle designed to accommodate the rider/driver and another passenger rider
  - a tandem bicycle
  - a watercraft designed to accommodate two persons, such as a kayak with two cockpits
  - an item of furniture with two seats, such as a loveseat
  - a town with two seats, such as a lovetown

== Other uses ==
- "2 Seater" (song), by YBN Nahmir, 2020
- "2Seater", a song by Tyler, the Creator from the 2015 album Cherry Bomb
