= YBN (collective) =

American hip-hop collective

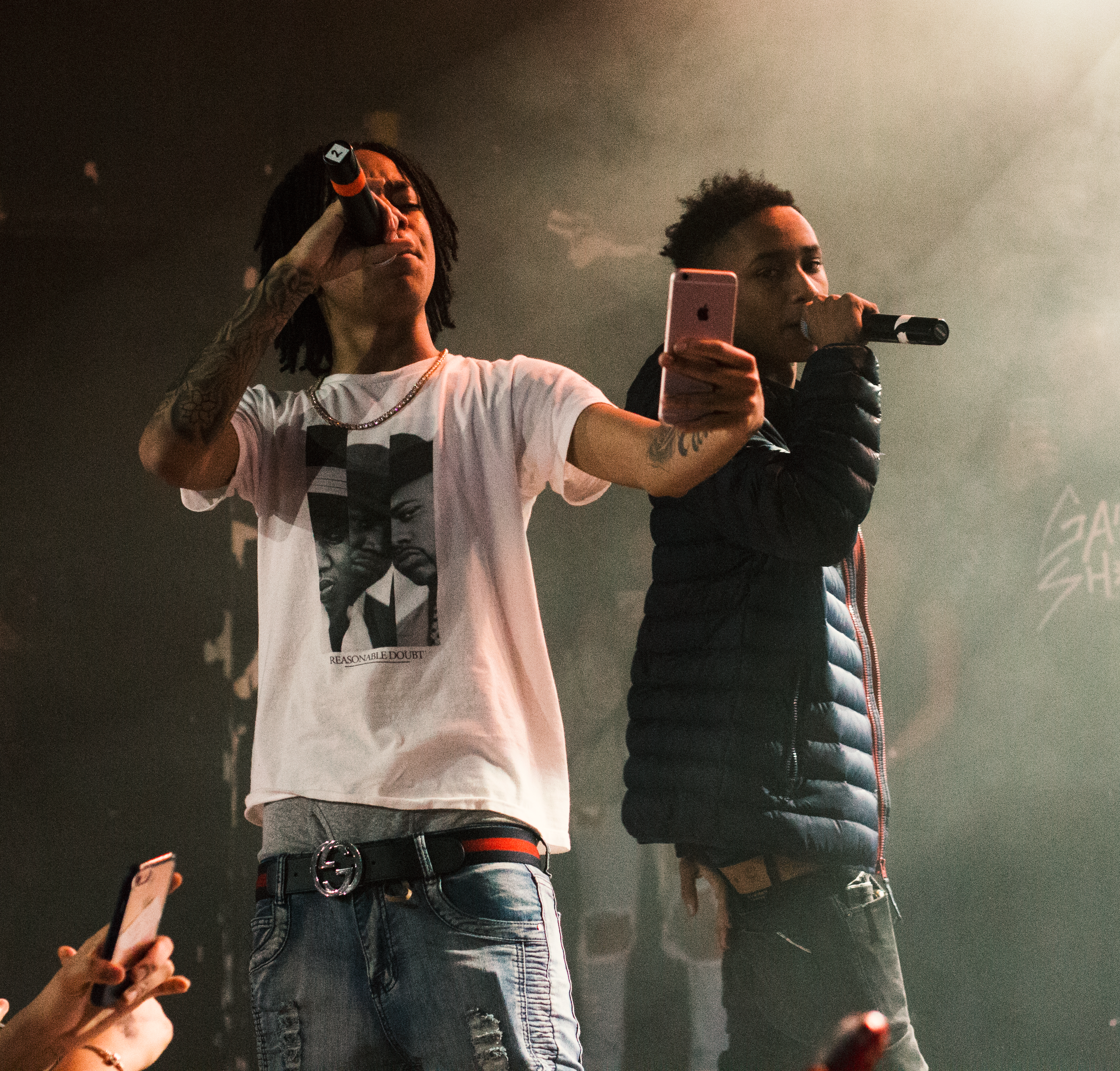
- YBN Nahmir (left) and YBN Glizzy performing together in January 2018

Background information
- Origin: Birmingham, Alabama, U.S.
- Genres: Hip hop; trap
- Years active: 2014–2020
- Labels: Atlantic; Art@War
- Past members: Cordae; YBN Nahmir; Almighty Jay; YBN Glizzy; YBN Filip; YBN Manny; YBN Walker; YBN Carl; YBN Dayday; YBN Blick; YBN Hardboy; YBN max ochuro; YBN Valley (deceased)
- Website: y-b-n.com

YBN (short for Young Boss Niggas) was an American hip-hop collective formed by Nick Simmons, who goes by the stage name YBN Nahmir. YBN was a collective of rappers, record producers, social media personalities, and promoters. The collective included members from Alabama, Texas, Gothenburg, California, Maryland, Connecticut, and Narberth, Pennsylvania.

On September 7, 2018, YBN released their only collaborative project, YBN: The Mixtape, which featured guest appearances from Gucci Mane, Wiz Khalifa, Lil Skies, Machine Gun Kelly, and Chris Brown.

== History ==
In 2014, Nick Simmons, better known as YBN Nahmir, met YBN Almighty Jay on the video game Grand Theft Auto V. Nahmir later introduced Almighty Jay to his close friend YBN Glizzy, whom he met on a San Andreas roleplay for Grand Theft Auto Online through an Xbox Looking for Group post.

YBN was originally a gaming collective where Nahmir and his friends played video games, recorded videos and uploaded their videos to YouTube and streamed on Twitch. In 2015, Nahmir and Almighty Jay decided to record a song after freestyling in Xbox Live group chats. The song, titled "Hood Mentality", was both of the artists' first song, and the start of the collective's move away from video games and towards music. In 2015, crew member YBN Valley died from a heart attack.

On September 18, 2017, Nahmir's debut single, "Rubbin Off the Paint", was released, and the music video premiered on WorldStarHipHop. The single featured production by Izak and went viral, peaking at number 46 on the Billboard Hot 100 chart. Nahmir used the financial success of the song to move himself to Los Angeles and help fellow friends in the collective also move to Los Angeles, marking the first time they had met in person.

Fellow members of the collective soon started to have viral songs, though none charted: YBN Almighty Jay's "Chopsticks" in November 2017, YBN Walker's "Gutta" in February 2018, and YBN NickyBaandz "Been Trippin" in April 2018.

YBN Nahmir and YBN Glizzy met Cordae Amari Dunston, better known as YBN Cordae, online in 2017. Though Cordae didn't play video games, he had been rapping longer than any other member of YBN and was older than the rest of the collective. He decided to formally join the collective in 2018 and, in May 2018, released a remix of Eminem's "My Name Is" that quickly went viral. He followed up with his breakout single, "Old Niggas", a remix and direct response to the song "1985 - (Intro to "The Fall Off)" by J. Cole. The song was mentioned by publications such as XXL, Complex and HipHopDX. The music videos for both songs premiered on Worldstarhiphop's YouTube channel.

The group announced their first world tour in July 2018, scheduled for fall 2018. The group's first full-length project, titled YBN: The Mixtape, which starred Nahmir, Almighty Jay, and Cordae, was announced in August 2018 and was released on September 7, 2018. It included the singles "Rubbin Off The Paint" (Nahmir), "Bounce Out With That" (Nahmir), "Chopsticks" (Almighty Jay), "Bread Winners" (Nahmir and Almighty Jay), and "Kung Fu" (Cordae).

On August 6, 2020, Nahmir took to Twitter to announce that the collective had officially disbanded. Cordae changed his stage name from YBN Cordae to “Cordae”.

== Past members ==
YBN consisted of:

- YBN Nahmir
- YBN Cordae
- YBN Almighty Jay
- YBN Manny
- YBN Nicky
- YBN Glizzy

== Discography ==
=== Mixtapes ===
List of mixtapes, with selected chart positions and details
| Title | Details | Peak chart positions | | | | Certifications |
| Title | Details | US | US R&B/HH | US Rap | CAN | Certifications |
|---|---|---|---|---|---|---|
| YBN: The Mixtape (with YBN Almighty Jay, YBN Cordae and YBN Nahmir) | Released: September 7, 2018; Label: Atlantic, Art@War; Formats: Digital download | 21 | 13 | 12 | 19 | RIAA: Gold; MC: Gold |

=== Singles ===
| Title | Year | Album |
|---|---|---|
| "Bread Winners" (with YBN Nahmir and YBN Almighty Jay) | 2018 | YBN: The Mixtape |
