= Prince Taee =

American rapper (born 2000)

- Also known as: Prince Taee
- Born: Deuntae Graham; July 1, 2000 (age 26); Inglewood, California, US
- Origin: Victorville, California, US; Las Vegas, Nevada, US
- Genres: Hip-hop
- Occupations: Rapper; singer; songwriter
- Years active: 2018–present
- Label: Atlantic Records

Deuntae Graham (born July 1, 2000), known professionally as Prince Taee, is an American rapper, singer, and songwriter from Las Vegas, Nevada.

== Early life ==
Born on July 1, 2000, Prince Taee is the eldest of six siblings. Taee was born in Inglewood, California his family then moved to Victorville, California and later settling in Las Vegas, Nevada in 2016.

== Career ==
=== Career and rise to popularity ===
In 2016, Prince Taee would start taking music seriously after gaining much popularity from his first record "Party". In 2019 Prince Taee landed his first deal with the independent label TML (Too Much Loyalty) based out of Los Angeles. In 2020 Prince Taee signed with Art@War and major record label Atlantic records. May 2020 Prince Taee releases "Free Crack" which featured My Crazy Ro and YBN Almighty Jay. After this record Taee followed up with another record entitled "Just My Type" featuring YK Osiris. April 9, 2021 Prince Taee releases "Braces" featuring YBN Nahmir.

== Personal life ==
Throughout his childhood Taee had music inspiration around him from his mother and step father. Prince Taee's biological father was not present but he took inspiration from his step father which was the grandson of the late Solomon Burke. In 2019 Prince Taee was shot in the leg in Los Angeles, California in a drive-by shooting.

== Discography ==
=== Singles ===
Title	Year	Album
"Party"	2016	Non-album single
"Just my type" (featuring YK Osiris)	2020	Non-album single
"Free Crack" (Featuring My Crazy Ro & YBN Almighty Jay	2020	Non-album single
"Braces" (featuring YBN Nahmir)	2021	Non-album single
