= Top of the World (Khwezi song) =

"Top of the World featuring Johnny Apple"

Single by Khwezi
- Released: 17 April 2015
- Recorded: 2014
- Genre: Pop
- Length: 3:31
- Label: Sony Music RCA
- Songwriters: Khwezi Sifunda; Johnny Apple
- Producer: Khwezi

"Top of the World" is a song by South African electronic music producer Khwezi and singer Johnny Apple. It was released on 17 April 2015 as a digital download in South Africa. Khwezi received his first award nomination as a solo artist when Top of the World was nominated for Song of the Year and Best Male at the OFM awards.

== Track listing ==
Digital download
No.	Title	Length
1.	"Top of the World"	3:31

== Charts ==
Chart (2015)	Peak position
South Africa (OFM (South Africa))	1
Zimbabwe iTunes	68

== Release history ==
Region	Date	Format	Label
South Africa	17 April 2015	Digital download	Sony Music Africa
