= Uncle Drew =

2018 film directed by Charles Stone III

- Theatrical release poster
- Directed by: Charles Stone III
- Written by: Jay Longino
- Produced by: Marty Bowen; Wyck Godfrey
- Starring: Kyrie Irving; Lil Rel Howery; Shaquille O'Neal; Chris Webber; Reggie Miller; Lisa Leslie; Erica Ash; J. B. Smoove; Mike Epps; Tiffany Haddish; Nick Kroll; Aaron Gordon
- Cinematography: Crash
- Edited by: Jeff Freeman; Sean Valla
- Music by: Christopher Lennertz
- Production companies: Summit Entertainment; Temple Hill Entertainment; Pepsi Productions
- Distributed by: Lionsgate
- Release date: June 29, 2018 (United States)
- Running time: 103 minutes
- Country: United States
- Language: English
- Budget: $18 million
- Box office: $46.7 million

Uncle Drew is a 2018 American sports comedy film directed by Charles Stone III and written by Jay Longino. It stars Kyrie Irving as the title character from his Pepsi Max advertisements that began airing in 2012, along with former NBA players Shaquille O'Neal, Chris Webber, Reggie Miller, and Nate Robinson, as well as former WNBA player Lisa Leslie. Lil Rel Howery, Erica Ash, J. B. Smoove, Mike Epps, Tiffany Haddish, Nick Kroll, and Aaron Gordon also star.

The film was released in the United States by Lionsgate on June 29, 2018, and received mixed reviews from critics, who praised the performances of the cast, but called the direction and screenplay "formulaic".

== Plot ==
In Harlem, Dax Winslow is the underappreciated basketball coach of the Harlem Money and their star player, Casper Jones. Dax spends lavishly to keep both his girlfriend, Jess, and Casper happy, despite being a clerk at Foot Locker. During practice Mookie Bass, Dax's longtime rival, arrives and taunts him about the upcoming Rucker Classic. In a dream sequence, it is revealed that Dax was an orphan who planned on becoming a basketball player, but was humiliated by Mookie after he had a shot blocked by him in their youth. The next day at work Casper demands expensive new shoes from Dax, who effectively bankrupts himself purchasing them. Despite this, Mookie successfully recruits Casper and the rest of Dax's team away from him, leading to a confrontation involving Dax forcibly trying to remove Casper's shoes that is filmed and shown on ESPN. Due to this humiliation, Jess dumps him and kicks him out of her apartment.

Dejected, Dax has little luck finding players for a new team until the cantankerous Angelo encourages him to seek out Uncle Drew, a well-remembered streetball legend who, along with his team, disappeared after missing the finals of the 1968 Rucker. After seeing a demonstration of Drew's prowess, Dax recruits him for the team, neglecting to inform him about the prize money. Drew agrees to join Dax under the condition that they recruit his original teammates.

They set off in Drew's van and recruit Preacher, who has since become an actual preacher, but incur the wrath of his wife Betty Lou who pursues them as they leave town. They next reunite with the partially blind Lights and wheelchair user Boots whose granddaughter, Maya, volunteers at the nursing home looking after them. They escape and make it to the karate dojo of Big Fella. Big Fella is reluctant to join the team, as he still holds a grudge against Drew, but Dax persuades him to join. After his credit card is declined at a gas station, Dax attempts to hustle the coach of a girls basketball team to earn money for fuel. Dax's team loses, but Drew offers up the money to help Dax after learning the real motive for the game, and Maya begins to appreciate him for the way he treats the elders.

Returning to Rucker Park, Drew gives each member of his team gear that restores their faith and abilities, but Big Fella still refuses to cooperate with Drew. During the first round, Big Fella and Drew tussle on the court, almost costing the team the win. Eventually, Drew acknowledges his mistake: sleeping with Big Fella's late wife before the big game. He admits that he too loved her and the two make amends.

Meanwhile, Dax learns that Mookie and Jess are dating, and begins falling for Maya. After learning about the tournament's prize money from Angelo, Drew angrily confronts Dax for misleading him to believe that he wanted to only have him on the team to help the community, but instead ending up using him to better his image and fix all of the trouble he's gotten himself in previously. As a result, this causes Dax to confess about his past with Mookie, causing Drew to forgive him. While playing in the semi-finals, Big Fella suddenly has a heart attack and is taken to the hospital. Betty Lou arrives but instead of chastising Preacher, she agrees to fill in as the team's fifth member.

Dax and his team, now renamed the Harlem Buckets, play against Mookie's team in the finals who are an even match for them. Late in the game Lights and Casper collide and are both injured, forcing Dax and Mookie to fill in. Dax still lacks self-confidence, but his teammates give him the advice he needs and he manages to make the game-winning shot, beating Mookie and earning everyone's respect. Returning to the hospital the team reunite with Big Fella, Dax uses the prize money to pay his medical bills, and ESPN now hails Dax as a hero.

During the credits Jess is shown trying to call Dax about getting back together, having dumped Mookie, but becomes increasingly distraught when he doesn't answer. She eventually curses at her phone and gives up.

== Cast ==
- Kyrie Irving as Uncle Drew, a streetball legend.
- Lil Rel Howery as Dax Winslow, a streetball team manager.
  - Ashton Tyler as Young Dax
- Shaquille O'Neal as Big Fella, Uncle Drew's former teammate who now runs a martial arts dojo.
- Chris Webber as Preacher, Uncle Drew's former teammate who is now a church minister.
- Reggie Miller as Wilbur "Lights" Wallace, Uncle Drew's former teammate who is legally blind.
- Nate Robinson as Boots, Uncle Drew's former teammate who has catatonic schizophrenia.
- Lisa Leslie as Betty Lou, Preacher's wife.
- Aaron Gordon as Casper Jones, a streetball player
- Erica Ash as Maya, Boots' granddaughter and Dax's love interest.
- J.B. Smoove as Angelo, a Harlem resident who remembers Uncle Drew.
- Mike Epps as Louis, a Harlem resident who is Angelo's friend.
- Tiffany Haddish as Jess, Dax's materialistic ex-girlfriend and Mookie's girlfriend. She is also a gold digger.
- Nick Kroll as Mookie Bass, Dax's longtime rival.
- Wesley Witherspoon as Mario, a streetball player.
- Barry Rohrssen as a referee.

Making cameo appearances as themselves are Sal Masekela, John Calipari, Justin Mathis, Bill Sizemore, Scoop Jackson, Pee Wee Kirkland, Earl Monroe, Chris Mullin, Bill Walton, George Gervin, Steve Nash, David Robinson, Jerry West, Dikembe Mutombo, NeNe Leakes, Rick Barry, Rick Ross, Scott Van Pelt and Ben Nethongkome.

== Production ==
On February 16, 2017, PepsiCo announced that it would partner Temple Hill Entertainment for the production of the film, featuring the character Uncle Drew from the Pepsi Max advertisements. On September 5, 2017, ESPN's SportsCenter revealed the cast. Lil Rel Howery said that Irving heard about his trade from the Cleveland Cavaliers to the Boston Celtics while filming.

== Music and soundtrack ==
The film's soundtrack, Uncle Drew: Original Motion Picture Soundtrack, was released by RCA Records on June 18, 2018. Many artists were featured on the album, including Wiz Khalifa, 2 Chainz, French Montana, Khalid, 21 Savage, Yo Gotti, ASAP Rocky, H.E.R., Kid Ink, Leikeli47, G-Eazy, and LunchMoney Lewis.

Track listing:

1. "Harlem Anthem" - ASAP Ferg
2. "1942" - G-Eazy featuring Yo Gotti and YBN Nahmir
3. "New Thang" - French Montana and Remy Ma
4. "Cocky" - ASAP Rocky, Gucci Mane and 21 Savage featuring London on da Track
5. "I Can Feel It" - GoldLink featuring H.E.R.
6. "Light Flex" - Tone Stith featuring 2 Chainz
7. "Chain Gang" - Leikeli47 featuring Clyde Guevara
8. "Ballin" - Logic
9. "Records" - Cousin Stizz
10. "Stronger" - Dipset featuring Drama
11. "I Need Your Lovin" - Nao
12. "Stay" - Khalid
13. "Us" - Kid Ink featuring Elley Duhé
14. "What's the Play" - Wiz Khalifa
15. "Clap Your Hands" - Grace
16. "Ridiculous" - Kyrie Irving featuring LunchMoney Lewis

== Reception ==
=== Box office ===
Uncle Drew grossed $42.5 million in the United States and Canada, and $4.1 million in other territories, for a total worldwide gross of $46.5 million.

In the United States and Canada, Uncle Drew was released alongside Sicario: Day of the Soldado, and was projected to gross $11–15 million from 2,742 theaters in its opening weekend. It made $6.1 million on its first day, including $1.1 million from Thursday night previews. It went on to debut to $15.5 million, finishing fourth at the box office, behind Jurassic World: Fallen Kingdom, Incredibles 2, and Sicario: Day of the Soldado. It fell 56% in its second weekend, to $6.7 million, finishing sixth.

=== Critical response ===
On review aggregation website Rotten Tomatoes, the film has an approval rating of 62% based on 100 reviews, and an average rating of 5.8/10. The website's critical consensus reads, "Kyrie Irving's crossover to comedy is amiable enough to score with basketball fans, but Uncle Drew is held back by formulaic direction and too much product placement." On Metacritic, which assigns a normalized rating to reviews, the film has a weighted average score of 57 out of 100, based on reviews from 27 critics, indicating "mixed or average reviews". Audiences polled by CinemaScore gave the film an average grade of "A" on an A+ to F scale.

David Ehrlich of IndieWire gave the film a "B−" and wrote: "At heart, Uncle Drew is a personality-driven film. The plot is spare, and the storytelling gets super janky whenever screenwriter Jay Longino is asked to manufacture a new obstacle. But as wince-inducing as it can be to watch the film stall for time, or use the Rucker prize money to muster up some hollow conflict, the climactic streetball showdown pays off." Variety's Peter Debruge praised the performances of the NBA players and makeup, while saying the film is never that surprising or funny, writing, "While it won't increase your appetite for zero-calorie sugar water one bit (oddly enough, Nike gets far more prominent on-screen placement), this affectionate basketball-themed comedy from sports-savvy director Charles Stone III comes across as an effective feature-length ad for the game itself."

=== Accolades ===
Year	Award	Category	Recipients	Result	Reference
2018	People's Choice Awards	Best Comedy Movie of 2018	Uncle Drew	Shortlisted	

== Uncle Drew PepsiMax advertisements ==
In 2012, PepsiCo embarked on an internet-based advertising campaign for Pepsi Max with the character "Uncle Drew" played by Kyrie Irving. The first advertisement was conceived as being in the form of a short film rather than an explicit commercial. During the advertising campaign, some of the shorts were edited down to 30 second segments which appeared both online and on television. The original short was wildly popular; it was reported to be the second most watched "advertisement" on YouTube that year and among the 50 most-viewed viral videos worldwide, garnering more than 22 million views. PepsiCo and its advertising agency Davie Brown Entertainment quickly rolled out another commercial, Uncle Drew: Chapter 2, this time co-starring future NBA teammate Kevin Love and opening with an extended cameo by basketball legend Bill Russell. Over the next few years two more chapters followed, including NBA and WNBA stars Maya Moore, Nate Robinson, Ray Allen, Baron Davis, and J.B. Smoove. Some of these players appeared in the 2018 feature-length movie. Each chapter ranged between 5 and 7 minutes in length. Collectively they received over 118 million views by mid 2020 on YouTube.

The intention of these shorts was to form the backbone of an advertising campaign but Pepsi decided not to be heavy handed with the product. Marc Gilbar, then a creative director at Davie Brown, described how product placement was sufficient for their goals "[We] put a couple of barrel coolers of Pepsi MAX on the outside of the court. It was a warm night, and they were free, so people naturally started drinking it. In some places it may have felt like it was placed there, and it was, but the people weren't acting." PepsiCo also owns the Gatorade brand which can be seen in the shorts and feature films.

Kyrie Irving was credited as writer and director in these productions as he developed the character's personality, improvised dialog, and blocked out a lot of scenes. Additionally, Gilbar and the Davie Brown team created the Uncle Drew universe, makeup artist Ed French came up with the character's look, and Jonathan Klein directed. Klein was reported to give up credit to Irving to make the shorts seem more intriguing. Gilbar went on to be involved with the production of the 2018 feature-length movie.

Year	Title	Cast		Synopsis
Year	Title	Actor	Character	Synopsis
2012	Uncle Drew	Kyrie Irving	Uncle Drew	Pepsi MAX went to a pick-up game in Bloomfield, NJ and some magical things happened
2012	Uncle Drew: Chapter 2	Kyrie Irving; Kevin Love; Bill Russell	Uncle Drew; Wes; Himself	Uncle Drew visits a basketball legend who sends him to Los Angeles to get his old team back together
2013	Uncle Drew: Chapter 3	Kyrie Irving; Maya Moore; Nate Robinson	Uncle Drew; Betty Lou; Lights	Uncle Drew visits an underground jazz club in downtown Chicago
2015	Uncle Drew: Chapter 4	Ray Allen; Baron Davis; Kyrie Irving; J.B. Smoove	Walt; Louis; Uncle Drew; Angelo	Uncle Drew is down in Miami putting in work and settling old scores

== See also ==
- List of basketball films
