= Rubbin Off the Paint =

2017 single by YBN Nahmir

Single by YBN Nahmir

from the album YBN: The Mixtape
- Released: September 18, 2017
- Genre: Gangsta rap; trap
- Length: 2:37
- Label: Atlantic; Art@War
- Songwriters: Nick Simmons; Hans Adam
- Producer: Izak

YBN Nahmir singles chronology
"Bail Out" (2017)	"Rubbin Off the Paint" (2017)	"Bounce Out with That" (2018)

Music video
- "Rubbin Off The Paint" on YouTube

"Rubbin Off the Paint" is the debut single by American rapper YBN Nahmir. It was originally released on Nahmir's SoundCloud account on August 21, 2017, but was released for digital download and streaming on September 18, 2017. The single peaked at number 46 on the US Billboard Hot 100, and was certified gold by the RIAA in May 2018. Since then, the single has been certified 2× platinum by the RIAA.

== Background ==
The song was recorded in Simmons' bedroom with a $50 Blue Snowball microphone and a sock covering it to act as a pop filter. The song was produced by a Swedish record producer Izak. After the success of the song, Simmons was pulled out of school due to his exceptional popularity and forced to start online classes. The song debuted at No. 79 on the Billboard Hot 100 and peaked at number 46.

== Music video ==
Simmons premiered the official music video for "Rubbin Off the Paint" on September 18, 2017, on WorldStarHipHop's YouTube channel. The video for the song was directed in one take due to Simmons having school the following day. The song quickly went viral with Simmons explaining it as "blowing up overnight." Its music video currently has over 221 million views on YouTube.

== Charts ==
=== Weekly charts ===
Chart (2017–2018)	Peak position
Canada Hot 100 (Billboard)	85
US Billboard Hot 100	46
US Hot R&B/Hip-Hop Songs (Billboard)	17

=== Year-end charts ===
Chart (2018)	Position
US Hot R&B/Hip-Hop Songs (Billboard)	63

== Certifications ==
Region	Certification	Certified units/sales
Canada (Music Canada)	Platinum	80,000^{‡}
New Zealand (RMNZ)	Gold	15,000^{‡}
United States (RIAA)	2× Platinum	2,000,000^{‡}
^{‡} Sales+streaming figures based on certification alone.
