= Opp Stoppa =

2019 single by YBN Nahmir

Single by YBN Nahmir

from the album Visionland
- Released: June 10, 2019
- Length: 1:05
- Label: Atlantic; Art@War
- Songwriters: Nicholas Simmons; Ashton Woodench
- Producer: Ashton Woodench

YBN Nahmir singles chronology
"Spunky" (2019)	"Opp Stoppa" (2019)	"Blowing Trees" (2019)

Music video
- "Opp Stoppa" on YouTube

Remix
- Cover art of the official remix featuring 21 Savage

Music video
- "Opp Stoppa (Remix)" on YouTube

"Opp Stoppa" is a song by American rapper YBN Nahmir, first released in June 2019. A sleeper hit, it went viral on TikTok in 2020 and was subsequently re-released on November 24, 2020. Two remixes of the song have since been released in 2021, the first featuring British-American rapper 21 Savage and the second featuring American rapper Lil Eazzyy. The song is also the lead single from YBN Nahmir's debut studio album Visionland (2021).

== Background ==
In an interview with XXL in May 2021, YBN Nahmir said that "Opp Stoppa" means "Something to use against another human being. Someone that's not on your side, I guess. Like, it could be like a gun, a sword, anything." According to him, "Opp Stoppa" revolved around his life but it "really don't connect to me like that anymore." He also shouts out to Chief Keef in the song. Nahmir revealed that the song was originally a freestyle rap and composed in 2018.

The song began trending on TikTok in 2020, eventually becoming the top song of the platform.

== Remixes ==
On January 22, 2021, an official remix of the song featuring 21 Savage was released following its popularity on TikTok. A second remix, which features Lil Eazzyy, was released on April 23, 2021.

== Music video ==
A music video of the original song premiered on June 10, 2019, on the YouTube channel of WorldStarHipHop.

The music video of the remix featuring 21 Savage was released on February 18, 2021. In it, YBN Nahmir throws a party in the front lawn of a house in the hood, with a card tables, box television set and an oven, from which a guest produces baked bird for the group.

== Charts ==
Chart (2021)	Peak position
Canada (Canadian Hot 100)	72
New Zealand Hot Singles (RMNZ)	30
US Billboard Hot 100	78
US Hot R&B/Hip-Hop Songs	29

== Certifications ==
Region	Certification	Certified units/sales
New Zealand (RMNZ)	Gold	15,000^{‡}
United States (RIAA)	Platinum	1,000,000^{‡}
^{‡} Sales+streaming figures based on certification alone.
