= The Business (Yung Berg song) =

Single by Yung Berg featuring Casha

from the album Look What You Made Me
- B-side: "Sexy Lady"
- Released: May 13, 2008
- Recorded: 2007–2008
- Genre: Hip-hop; R&B
- Length: 4:18
- Label: Epic; Koch
- Songwriters: Christian Ward; Casha Darjean; Robert Watson
- Producers: Yung Berg; Rob Holladay

Yung Berg singles chronology
"Do That There" (2008)	"The Business" (2008)	"Sex N' The City" (2010)

Casha singles chronology
"Sun Don't Shine" (2002)	"The Business" (2008)	"Kill the Lights" (2012)

"The Business" is the second official single (third overall) released from Yung Berg's debut and only album as a rapper, Look What You Made Me. The song contains a guest appearance from former Radio Killa signee Casha, and is produced by Rob Holladay and Yung Berg (now Hitmaka). It was released May 13, 2008. "The Business" peaked within the top 40 of the Billboard Hot 100 and received gold certification by the RIAA on November 11, 2008, for sales of 500,000 copies.

== Remix ==
The official remix features K-Young, Pleasure P, Twista, Cap 1, Maino and Jim Jones. Another remix features Raheem DeVaughn. The video shows Yung Berg with his "business woman", giving her "business" morning and night.

== Charts ==
=== Weekly charts ===
Chart (2008)	Peak position
New Zealand (Recorded Music NZ)	26
US Billboard Hot 100	33
US Hot R&B/Hip-Hop Songs (Billboard)	6
US Hot Rap Songs (Billboard)	5
US Rhythmic Airplay (Billboard)	6

=== Year-end charts ===
Chart (2008)	Position
US Hot R&B/Hip-Hop Songs (Billboard)	58
US Rhythmic (Billboard)	35

== Certifications ==
Region	Certification	Certified units/sales
United States (RIAA)	Gold	500,000^{^}
^{^} Shipments figures based on certification alone.
