= Snapbacks & Tattoos =

2012 single by Driicky Graham

Single by Driicky Graham
- Released: March 20, 2012
- Recorded: 2011
- Genre: Hip hop; pop rap
- Length: 3:29
- Label: eOne
- Songwriters: Nasir Graham; Christian Ward; Armond Redmen
- Producers: Yung Berg; Arch Tha Boss

Driicky Graham singles chronology
"Snapbacks & Tattoos" (2012)	"Shut It Down" (2013)

Music video
- "Snapbacks & Tattoos" on YouTube

Remix cover
- Cover art of the official remix.

"Snapbacks & Tattoos" is the debut single by American rapper Driicky Graham, released on March 20, 2012. The song was produced by Yung Berg and Arch Tha Boss. It is Graham's most successful song and appears on the soundtrack of the 2013 film Kevin Hart: Let Me Explain.

== Background ==
In an interview with BET, Driicky Graham stated the song came from him being inspired by his first tattoo, which was of his babysitter who had died. He added, "And, of course, snapbacks is just fashion that I see everybody wearing. It's not something even new — you can look at a movie like Juice or something like that and just see that snapbacks were in even back then. It's just something that's a part of our culture in general." With regard to the production, Yung Berg told AllHipHop:

The "Snapbacks and Tattoos" beat, I originally thought Big Sean should have had the record. We changed the beat like seven different times. The thing was, I didn't know what to do with it. I cut a mixtape verse to it – I didn't like it. So, I played it on my TV for Driicky when he was in Miami, and the rest is history. He left with the beat.

Berg also stated he did not have a chance to mix the record.

== Critical reception ==
Deen of Passion of the Weiss gave a favorable review of the song, writing "this is an excellent piece of pop rap genius. It's just catchy as all the fucks. The hook is great and so is the rapping (even if Driicky over reaches a bit on technique near the end of the first verse. Just chill bruh, you ain't got it like that yet). But the star of the show is really the beat. The production probably owes major debts to the shit Diplo did for Chris Brown and Bangladesh's crazed 808 experiments ('A Milli' et al.), but that's irrelevant. This shit is great. A little Swizzy, oops I meant busy at points, but I'd have a lot of difficulty resisting this shit after about 8 beers and in the presence of tits."

Complex included the song in their list "The 10 Worst Songs About Tattoos".

== Remixes ==
A remix of the song featuring American rapper Soulja Boy was released on June 8, 2012, which sees him boasting about his wealthy lifestyle involving traveling and women. The official remix was released on August 8, 2012, and features American rappers Roscoe Dash, French Montana and Cash Out. Rapper Bow Wow was planned to also appear on the remix, but his verse was cut.

== Charts ==
Chart (2012)	Peak position
US Billboard Hot 100	73
US Hot R&B/Hip Hop Songs (Billboard)	23
US Hot Rap Songs (Billboard)	12

== Certifications ==
Region	Certification	Certified units/sales
United States (RIAA)	Gold	500,000^{^}
^{^} Shipments figures based on certification alone.
