= 2 Seater (song) =

2020 single by YBN Nahmir featuring G-Eazy and Offset

Single by YBN Nahmir featuring G-Eazy and Offset

from the album Visionland
- Released: March 19, 2020
- Genre: Hip-hop; trap
- Length: 3:52
- Label: Atlantic; Art@War
- Songwriters: Nicholas Simmons; Gerald Gillum; Kiari Cephus; Christopher Dotson; Jacquez Lowe; Samuel Jimenez; Kevin Price; Chrishan Ward
- Producers: Go Grizzly; Smash David; Hitmaka

YBN Nahmir singles chronology
"Bac 2 Bac PT. 2" (2020)	"2 Seater" (2020)	"Is Hot!" (2020)

G-Eazy singles chronology
"Cruel Intentions" (2020)	"2 Seater" (2020)	"Lotto (Remix)" (2020)

Offset singles chronology
"Had Enough" (2019)	"2 Seater" (2020)	"Sticky (Offset Remix)" (2020)

Music video
- "2 Seater" on YouTube

"2 Seater" is a song by American rapper YBN Nahmir featuring fellow American rappers G-Eazy and Offset. It was released on March 19, 2020, as the second single from Nahmir's debut studio album Visionland.

== Background ==
The song is YBN Nahmir's second single released in 2020, with the first one being "Talkin" in January. Nahmir previously linked with G-Eazy on his April 2018 track "1942".

== Music video ==
The music video for the single was released on March 25, 2020. It was directed by Arrad.

== Critical reception ==
Jon Powell of Revolt called the song "perfect for the radio or club dance floors".

== Charts ==
Chart (2020)	Peak position
New Zealand Hot Singles (RMNZ)	32
