= Gifts (song) =

Single by Ray J

from the album All I Feel
- Released: June 12, 2008
- Recorded: 2008
- Genre: R&B
- Length: 3:23
- Label: Knockout/Deja 34/Songbook/CBE/Epic/Koch
- Songwriters: William Ray Norwood Jr., Noel Fisher
- Producer: Noel "Detail" Fisher

Ray J singles chronology
"You Know Me" (2008)	"Gifts" (2008)	"Keep It Playa" (2008)

"Gifts" is the second single from Ray J's album All I Feel. The video was released on June 12, 2008.

== Remix ==
A remix was released on July 1, 2008. The remix features Lil Wayne, Shorty Mack and Game.

== Charts ==
Chart (2008)	Peak Position
U.S. Billboard Hot R&B/Hip-Hop Songs	65
