= All I Feel =

Studio album by Ray J
- Released: April 8, 2008
- Length: 40:35
- Labels: Knockout; Deja34; Epic; Koch
- Producers: Christopher "Drumma Boy" Gholson; DJ Quik; Mario Myers; Charles "Chuck Heat" Henderson; Noel "Detail" Fisher; Rodney "Darkchild" Jerkins; Trackmasters; Darrin "Jeeky Man" Lockings; Jay "Waxx" Garfield; Fizzy Womack

Ray J chronology
Raydiation (2005)	All I Feel (2008)	For the Love of Ray J (2009)

Singles from All I Feel
- 1. "Sexy Can I" Released: October 23, 2007; 2. "Gifts" Released: June 12, 2008

"Sexy Can I"
Ray J featuring Yung Berg perform "Sexy Can I" from All I Feel and Look What You Made Me

All I Feel is the fourth studio album by American singer Ray J. It was released by his own label Knockout Entertainment in partnership with Deja34 Records, Epic Records and Koch Records on April 8, 2008. It is the second album by Ray J to be labeled with a Parental Advisory sticker. The album features the singles "Sexy Can I" featuring labelmate Yung Berg, and "Gifts", and was his only album with Koch Records.

== Conception ==
An article in the Los Angeles Times asserted that Ray J wanted to distance himself from his child star image from his days acting in Moesha, the sitcom that starred his older sister Brandy. Reporter Serena Kim noticed that the lyrics were becoming more "graphic" and sexually explicit.

== Critical reception ==
Professional ratings
Review scores
Source	Rating
About.com	2/5 stars
Artistdirect	4/5 stars
DJBooth.net	1/5 stars
Okayplayer	2/5 stars
USA Today	1.5/5 stars

All I Feel was panned by most music critics. Steve Jones of USA Today rated this album one-and-a-half stars out of a possible five, stating that the album "doesn’t leave much of an impression, even though Ray J tries hard to leave one". Okayplayer editor Jason Reynolds considered Ray J's sexual and drug content to be vulgar and "forced". Clover Hope of Billboard magazine gave this album a moderate review for the perception that Ray J "tries too hard" to "prove himself" to be grown up, "like a wannabe rapper in singer's clothing." In a positive review for AllMusic, editor Jim Allen wrote: "Ray J shows that he's all grown up on All I Feel. His fourth album finds him working every angle of contemporary R&B [...] Whatever the mode, his delivery is both effective and seemingly effortless."

== Commercial performance ==
The album debuted and peaked at number 7 on the US Billboard 200, with first week sales of 39,000 units. It marked Ray J's first top ten entry as well as his highest-charting album since This Ain't a Game (2001). All I Feel also opened at number one on Billboard's Top R&B/Hip Hop Albums chart, becoming his second top ten album on the chart as well as his first to reach the top spot.

== Track listing ==
All I Feel track listing
No.	Title	Writer(s)	Producer(s)	Length
1.	"Don't Wanna Be Right" (Intro)	Ray J; Earl Jackson; Carl Hampton; Homer Banks; Bailey Ricardo Adams	Drumma Boy	1:38
2.	"I Like to Trick"	Ray J; Mario Myers; Derelle Owens	Mario Myers	3:23
3.	"Sexy Can I" (featuring Yung Berg)	Ray J; Christian Ward; Victor Carraway; Noel "Detail" Fisher	Fisher	3:24
4.	"Gifts"	Ray J; Fisher	Fisher	3:23
5.	"Girl from the Bronx"	Charles Henderson	Henderson	3:28
6.	"Jump Off"	Atozzio Dishawn Towns	Rodney "Darkchild" Jerkins	3:53
7.	"Boyfriend"	Range; Apryl Williams; Samuel Barnes	Trackmasters	3:28
8.	"All I Feel"	Johnta Austin	Jerkins	4:28
9.	"It's Up to You"	Fisher	Fisher	3:27
10.	"Where You At" (featuring the Game)	D. Lockings; Terrell Taylor; Troy Thompson	DJ Quik	2:57
11.	"Real Nigga" (featuring Styles P)	Ray J; Arnold Mischkulnig; David Styles; Julian Garfield; Robert Perry	Jay Garfield	4:01
12.	"Good Girl Gone Bad" (featuring Shorty Mack)	Mischkulnig; Owens; Jamal Gerard Grinnage; Perry	Fizzy Womack	3:52
13.	"I Can Feel It" (Outro)	Ray J	Ray J	1:53

iTunes Store bonus track
No.	Title	Writer(s)	Producer(s)	Length
14.	"Good Times" (featuring Shorty Mack)	Ray J; Owens	Ray J	4:14

== Charts ==
=== Weekly charts ===
Weekly chart performance for All I Feel
Chart (2008)	Peak position
UK R&B Albums (Official Charts)	26
US Billboard 200	7
US Top R&B/Hip-Hop Albums (Billboard)	1

=== Year-end charts ===
Year-end chart performance for All I Feel
Chart (2008)	Position
US Top R&B/Hip-Hop Albums (Billboard)	84
