= 1942 (song) =

Single by G-Eazy featuring Yo Gotti and YBN Nahmir

from the album Uncle Drew (Original Motion Picture Soundtrack)
- Released: April 13, 2018
- Genre: Hip-hop
- Length: 3:33
- Label: RCA
- Songwriters: Gerald Gillum; Mario Mims; Nicholas Simmons; Melvin Moore; Jeremy Felton; Samuel Jimenez; Edgar Ferrera; Floyd Bentley; Christian Ward
- Producers: Smash David; SkipOnDaBeat; Hitmaka

G-Eazy singles chronology
"Sober" (2017)	"1942" (2018)	"Reverse" (2018)

Yo Gotti singles chronology
"Juice" (2017)	"1942" (2018)	"Wraith" (2018)

YBN Nahmir singles chronology
"Bounce Out with That" (2018)	"1942" (2018)	"Bread Winners" (2018)

Music video
- "1942" on YouTube

"1942" is a song by American rapper G-Eazy featuring fellow American rappers Yo Gotti and YBN Nahmir. The artists co-wrote the song with singer Jeremih, as well as its producers Hitmaka, Smash David and SkipOnDaBeat. It was released by RCA Records on April 13, 2018, as the second single for the soundtrack to the film Uncle Drew (2018).

== Music video ==
The music video premiered on May 17, 2018 on G-Eazy's Vevo account.

== Composition ==
"1942" features a "hypnotic and bouncy production" from Hitmaka and "a catchy hook" provided by Gotti. Lyrically, G-Eazy raps about ignoring the rules and doing whatever he wants.

== Personnel ==
Credits adapted from Tidal.

- Hitmaka – production
- Smash David – production
- SkipOnDaBeat – production
- Jeremih — songwriting
- Jaycen Joshua – mix engineering
- David Nakaji – engineering assistance
- Ben Milchev – engineering assistance
- Dakari – record engineering
- Brian White – record engineering

== Charts ==
Chart (2018)	Peak position
Canada Hot 100 (Billboard)	90
US Billboard Hot 100	70
US Hot R&B/Hip-Hop Songs (Billboard)	29
US Rhythmic Airplay (Billboard)	12

== Certifications ==
Region	Certification	Certified units/sales
Canada (Music Canada)	Platinum	80,000^{‡}
New Zealand (RMNZ)	Gold	15,000^{‡}
United States (RIAA)	2× Platinum	2,000,000^{‡}
^{‡} Sales+streaming figures based on certification alone.

== Release history ==
Region	Date	Format	Label	Ref.
Various	April 13, 2018	Digital download; streaming	RCA	
United States	May 29, 2018	Rhythmic contemporary radio	BPG; RVG; RCA	
United States	May 29, 2018	Urban contemporary radio	BPG; RVG; RCA	
