= Almost Famous: The Sexy Lady EP =

EP by Yung Berg
- Released: July 24, 2007 (U.S.)
- Genre: Hip hop
- Length: 27:23
- Label: Epic
- Producer: JFK; Rob Holladay; Danja

Yung Berg chronology
Almost Famous: The Sexy Lady EP (2007)	Look What You Made Me (2008)

Professional ratings
Review scores
Source	Rating
AllMusic	2/5 stars
RapReviews	7/10 stars

Almost Famous: The Sexy Lady EP is an extended play by American rapper Yung Berg. It was released on July 24, 2007, via Epic Records. The only single released from the EP was "Sexy Lady" featuring R&B singer Junior. The album debuted at number 32 on the U.S. Billboard 200, selling about 20,000 copies in its first week.

== Track listing ==
No.	Title	Producer(s)	Length
1.	"Sexy Lady" (featuring Junior)	Rob Holladay	3:50
2.	"Into It" (featuring JFK and Tony Loco)	JFK	3:49
3.	"Where Do We Go" (featuring Twista)	JFK	5:01
4.	"Almost Famous" (featuring Ms. Monet)	JFK	3:59
5.	"Sexy Lady (Remix)" (featuring Jim Jones and Rich Boy)	Rob Holladay	4:45
6.	"Painkiller" (featuring Nikki Flores)	Danja	5:59
Total length:			27:23

== Charts ==
Chart (2007)	Peak position
US Billboard 200	32
US Top R&B/Hip-Hop Albums (Billboard)	5
US Top Rap Albums (Billboard)	2
