= YBN Nahmir =

American rapper (born 1999)

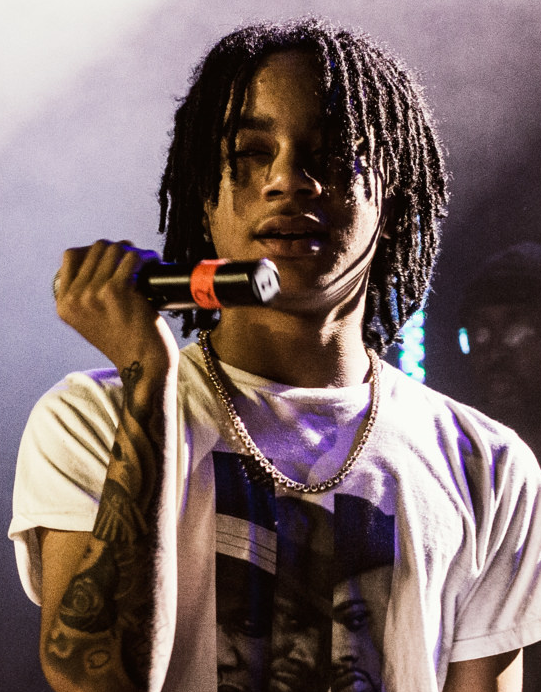
- YBN Nahmir performing in 2018

Background information
- Born: Nicholas Alexander Simmons; December 18, 1999 (age 26); Birmingham, Alabama, U.S.
- Genres: Southern hip-hop; trap
- Occupations: Rapper; singer; songwriter
- Years active: 2014–present
- Labels: Atlantic/Art@War (2018–2022); Def Jam (2022–2023); YBN Empire (2024–present)
- Formerly of: YBN
- Website: y-b-n.com

Nicholas Alexander Simmons (born December 18, 1999), known professionally as YBN Nahmir (Initialism for Young Boss Nigga Nahmir), is an American rapper. He was the de facto lead member of the short-lived hip hop collective YBN, and is best known for his 2017 single "Rubbin Off the Paint", which peaked at number 46 on the Billboard Hot 100. His 2018 single, "Bounce Out with That" peaked atop the Bubbling Under Hot 100 chart. His 2019 single, "Opp Stoppa" (remixed featuring 21 Savage), peaked at number 78 on the former chart and preceded the release of his debut studio album Visionland (2021), which was met with critical and commercial failure.

== Early life ==
Nicholas Simmons was born on December 18, 1999, in Birmingham, Alabama. He was raised in a home with his mother, his cousins and his aunt. Simmons attended Clay-Chalkville High School in Clay, Alabama, though dropped out following the success of "Rubbin Off the Paint;" he graduated in May 2018.

Simmons' interest in music started when he was fourteen years old and was gifted an Xbox 360 for Christmas. Simmons began to play the video game Rock Band (which he would later use to record his first song.) and eventually moved to playing Grand Theft Auto V and then started recording gameplay videos where he would generate a following on YouTube. During his time playing Grand Theft Auto V, Simmons would freestyle in Xbox Live parties and alongside numerous other friends, established the Young Boss Niggas collective.

== Career ==
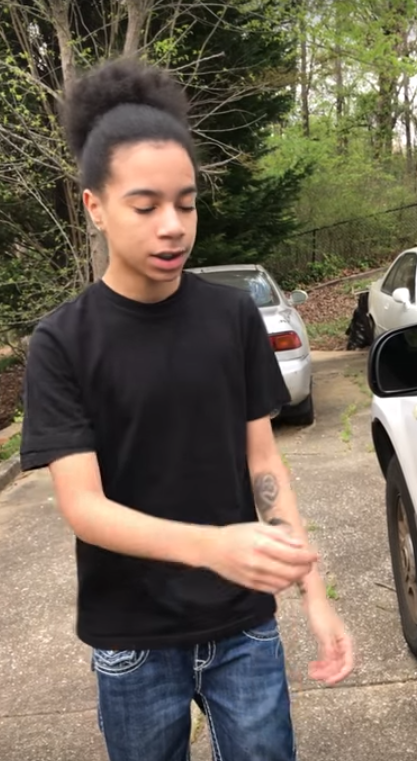
YBN Nahmir in April 2017 at the age of 17.

Simmons formed the hip hop collective YBN (an acronym for Young Boss Niggas) in Birmingham, Alabama in 2014 composed by him, YBN Almighty Jay, YBN Cordae, YBN Glizzy, his cousin YBN Manny, YBN Walker, YBN Nicky Baandz, YBN Malik, YBN Carl and YBN Dayday. Simmons uploaded his first song onto YouTube when he was fifteen with fellow YBN member, YBN Almighty Jay. The song, titled "Hood Mentality" was uploaded on March 21, 2015, to barely any reception. Simmons uploaded several more songs to YouTube before releasing his first mixtape on January 2, 2017, titled Believe In The Glo on SoundCloud. Simmons uploaded his second mixtape to SoundCloud on January 21, 2017. Simmons released "Rubbin Off the Paint" on September 18, 2017, to WorldStarHipHop's YouTube channel. The song quickly went viral with Simmons explaining it as "blowing up overnight." After the success of the song, Simmons began to skip school due to hot weather and exceptional popularity, and was forced to start online classes. The song debuted at 79 on the Billboard Hot 100 and peaked at 46.

In November 2017, Simmons was involved in controversy following his song being claimed by a record label after his manager sold the instrumental for the song to a third-party. In response, Simmons now has an in-house producer for his instrumentals who is a member of the YBN collective. Simmons released six more tracks in 2017. On January 23, 2018, Simmons released "Bounce Out with That" on Lyrical Lemonade's YouTube channel. The song wasn't available on streaming services for up to three days after the release of the music video. The song has accumulated over 159 million views on YouTube after its release. In April 2018, Simmons signed with Atlantic Records. He was later named as one of the members of XXL's "2018 Freshman Class" on June 12, 2018, competing in a cypher with Stefflon Don and Wifisfuneral.

On July 13, 2018, Simmons announced via Twitter he would do a Tour in Europe in the fall 2018 with Almighty Jay and Cordae. They would visit France, Germany, Poland, Sweden and more. The collective YBN released YBN: The Mixtape in 2018 with Gucci Mane, MGK and Lil Skies, between others. On March 22, 2019, he released "Baby 8". On June 10, 2019, he released a music video called "Opp Stoppa". On March 26, 2021, Simmons released his debut album Visionland.

On July 9, 2022, Simmons has confirmed to have signed a new recording deal with Def Jam Recordings, making him the second artist to draft instantly to the latter from Atlantic Records since Fabolous in 2006. In April 2025, he purchased a McDonald's location. In November 2025 YBN Nahmir performed at Rolling Loud India under the management of Jason Yang of Veneration Group and Veneration Touring.

== Musical style ==
Nahmir lists his main influences as rappers from the San Francisco Bay Area such as E-40. Talking on his influences in an interview with Billboard, Simmons stated that the lack of mainstream rappers from Birmingham made him listen to more artists from the West Coast such as Eazy-E and Tupac.

== Discography ==
=== Studio albums ===
List of studio albums, with selected details
Title	Details
Visionland	Released: March 26, 2021; Label: Atlantic, Art@War; Format: Digital download, streaming

=== Extended Plays ===
List of Extended Plays, with selected details
Title	Details
Faster Car Music	Released: August 19, 2022; Label: Def Jam; Format: Digital download, streaming

=== Mixtapes ===
List of mixtapes, with selected chart positions and details
Title	Details	Peak chart positions				Certifications
Title	Details	US	US R&B/HH	US Rap	CAN	Certifications
Head Honcho	Released October 5, 2015; Label: Self-released; Format: Digital download	—	—	—	—	
Believe in the Glo	Released: November 2, 2016; Label: Self-released; Format: Digital download	—	—	—	—	
#YBN	Released: January 21, 2017; Label: Self-released; Format: Digital download	—	—	—	—	
YBN: The Mixtape (with Almighty Jay, and Cordae)	Released: September 7, 2018; Label: Atlantic, Art@War; Formats: Digital download	21	13	12	19	RIAA: Gold; MC: Gold
"—" denotes a recording that did not chart or was not released in that territory.

=== Singles ===
==== As lead artist ====
List of singles as lead artist, with selected chart positions, showing year released
Title	Year	Peak chart positions					Certifications	Album
Title	Year	US	US R&B/HH	US Rap	CAN	NZ Hot	Certifications	Album
"I Got a Stick"	2017	—	—	—	—	—		Non-album singles
"Glizzy Hella Geekin"	2017	—	—	—	—	—		Non-album singles
"No Hook" (with YBN Almighty Jay)	2017	—	—	—	—	—		Non-album singles
"Bail Out"	2017	—	—	—	—	—		Non-album singles
"Rubbin Off the Paint"	2017	46	17	15	85	-	RIAA: 3× Platinum; MC: Platinum; RMNZ: Gold	YBN: The Mixtape
"Bounce Out with That" (solo or with Machine Gun Kelly)	2018	— (Note: "Bounce Out with That" did not enter the Billboard Hot 100, but peaked at number one on the Bubbling Under Hot 100 chart.)	47	—	76	—	RIAA: 2× Platinum; MC: 2× Platinum; RMNZ: Gold	YBN: The Mixtape
"Baby 8"	2019	—	—	—	—	—		Non-album singles
"Fuck It Up" (featuring City Girls and Tyga)	2019	—	—	—	—	—		Non-album singles
"Opp Stoppa" (solo or featuring 21 Savage)	2019	78	29	23	72	30	RIAA: 2× Platinum; RMNZ: Gold	Non-album singles
"Talkin"	2020	—	—	—	—	—		
"2 Seater" (featuring G-Eazy and Offset)	2020	—	—	—	—	32		Visionland
"I Remember"	2020	—	—	—	—	—		Non-album singles
"Pop Like This" (featuring Yo Gotti)	2020	—	—	—	—	—		Non-album singles
"Wake Up"	2020	—	—	—	—	—		Visionland
"—" denotes a recording that did not chart or was not released in that territory.

==== As featured artist ====
Title	Year	Peak chart positions			Certifications	Album
Title	Year	US	US R&B/HH	CAN	Certifications	Album
"Hi Bich (Remix)" (Bhad Bhabie featuring YBN Nahmir, Rich the Kid, and Asian da Brat)	2018	—	—	—		Non-album single
"1942" (G-Eazy featuring Yo Gotti and YBN Nahmir)	2018	70	29	90	RIAA: 2× Platinum; MC: Platinum; RMNZ: Gold	Uncle Drew
"Juveniles" (Wifisfuneral featuring YBN Nahmir)	2018	—	—	—		Ethernet
"Eastside" (Joose featuring YBN Nahmir)	2018	—	—	—		Non-album singles
"Big Chop" (Cuban Doll featuring YBN Nahmir)	2018	—	—	—		Non-album singles
"Run It Up" (DDG featuring Blac Youngsta, G Herbo, and YBN Nahmir)	2018	—	—	—		Sorry 4 the Hold Up and VALEDICTORIAN
"Spaz" (Bhad Bhabie featuring YBN Nahmir)	2018	—	—	—		Non-album singles
"Done with Her" (Khao featuring Gucci Mane, Lil Baby, Tabius Tate, and YBN Nahmir)	2019	—	—	—		Non-album singles
"I Might" (Lil Xan featuring Steven Cannon, YBN Almighty Jay, and YBN Nahmir)	2019	—	—	—		Non-album singles
"Thot Box" (Hitmaka featuring Meek Mill, 2 Chainz, A Boogie wit da Hoodie, Tyga, and YBN Nahmir)	2019	—	—	—		Big Tuh
"Braces" (Prince Taee featuring YBN Nahmir)	2021	—	—	—		Non-album single
"Victory" (Dvbbs featuring YBN Nahmir)	2021	—	—	—		Sleep
"Who Is That" (Kernald featuring YBN Nahmir)	2024	—	—			Non-album single
"—" denotes a recording that did not chart or was not released in that territory.
