= Khwezi Sifunda =

Khwezi
- Born: Khwezi Sifunda; Pietermartizburg, KwaZulu-Natal, South Africa
- Genres: Electronic, pop, hip hop
- Occupations: CEO, record producer, computer programmer
- Instruments: Keyboards, synthesizer, guitar
- Years active: 2008–present
- Label: Independent

Khwezi Sifunda, better known as Khwezi (born in Pietermartizburg, South Africa) is a South African computer programmer, internet entrepreneur, music producer and businessman.

== History ==
Khwezi is the founder and CEO of WeAreAfriKa. He gained popularity by being named as a feature artist on 5FM, South Africa's most popular radio station, as an artist on Rocking The Republic, a feature show on the radio station. Khwezi has worked with or written for notable artists/producers such as Rye Rye, Dej Loaf, DJ Chuckie, Makeba Riddick and Chris Brown.

On 1 June 2016 Khwezi founded "MBK" a London based company and is the CEO.

== Musical career ==
On 11 June 2014 he signed with Sony Music Entertainment's RCA Records. He released his debut single "Top of the World" on 17 April 2015. He got his first career number 1 record on May 24, 2015 when "Top of the World" reached the top spot on the OFM local music charts.

On 7 August 2015 he released the Babylon EP as a digital download on Sony Music.

Khwezi's track 'Feeling High', released on the independent American record label 'Bonfire Records' has gained over 2.1 million streams on streaming service Spotify.

== Awards and nominations ==
=== OFM Awards ===
Year	Nominee / work	Award	Result
2015	Khwezi	Song of the Year	Nominated

Metro FM Music Awards.

The Metro FM Music Awards are held annually by the South African Radio Station Metro FM.

Year	Nominee / work	Award	Result
2014	Danny K	Best RnB Album	Won

South African Music Awards

The South African Music Awards (SAMAs) are an annual award ceremony, run by the Recording Industry of South Africa (RiSA), where accolades are presented to members of South Africa's music industry.

Year	Nominee / work	Award	Result
2015	Toya Delazy	Best Pop Album	Nominated

== Discography ==
Title	Year	Artist	Writer	Producer	Remix
"All Eyes on Me"	2015	AKA			check
"Top of the World"	2015	Khwezi	check	check	
"Champions"	2015	Khwezi		check	
"Glasses to the Ceiling"	2015	Tumi Molekane			check
"My City feat. Cassper Nyovest"	2015	Toya Delazy			check
"Pushing On"	2014	The Kiffness			check
"Koma"	2014	DJ Switch			check
"Brown Eyes"	2014	Danny K			check
"Find a Way"	2014	The Kiffness			check
"He's Crazy"	2014	Goldfish			check
"Cheeky"	2014	Toya Delazy		check	
"Why Hate"	2014	Toya Delazy		check	
"U & Me (Jay Andromeda Remix)"	2014	ClassyMenace			check
"Don't Give Up feat. Paul Morrissey (Jay Andromeda Remix)"	2013	ClassyMenace			check
"Good Look”	2013	Danny K		check	
