= John (Lil Wayne song) =

Single by Lil Wayne featuring Rick Ross

from the album Tha Carter IV
- Released: March 24, 2011
- Recorded: 2011
- Genre: Hardcore hip-hop; trap
- Length: 4:47
- Label: Young Money; Cash Money; Universal Motown
- Songwriters: Dwayne Carter Jr.; William Roberts II; Christian Ward; Jamal Jones; Austin Owens; Robert Watson; Erik Ortiz; Kevin Crowe
- Producers: Yung Berg; Polow da Don; Ayo the Producer; Rob Holladay; J.U.S.T.I.C.E. League

Lil Wayne singles chronology
| "Bow Chicka Wow Wow" (2010) | "John" (2011) | "This Is What Rock n' Roll Looks Like" (2011) |

Rick Ross singles chronology
| "Can a Drummer Get Some?" (2011) | "John" (2011) | "Tupac Back" (2011) |

Music video
- "John" on YouTube

"John" is a song by American rapper Lil Wayne, and the second single from his album Tha Carter IV. The song features fellow American rapper Rick Ross, and it peaked at number 22 on the Billboard Hot 100. "John" was released on March 24, 2011, on iTunes. The song uses the hook from Rick Ross' song "I'm Not a Star" from his album Teflon Don. The song title is a reference to English musician John Lennon. Lil Wayne performed the song at 2011's MTV Video Music Awards to the riff of Black Sabbath song, Iron Man.

== Music video ==
The music video was released on VEVO on May 12, 2011. Birdman makes an appearance in the video, which was directed by Colin Tilley, who directed Chris Brown's "Look at Me Now," which also featured Wayne.

== Remixes ==
On May 11, rapper Ace Hood released a freestyle over the beat of "John," which was off his "Body Bag Vol. 1" mixtape. Another rapper Wiz Khalifa released a remix to "John" titled "Chuck". Rapper Chamillionaire freestyled a verse along with the original lyrics on his Badass Freemixes 2 mixtape. On December 26, Lil Wyte also released his own version on his Wyte Christmas mixtape. Tyga also released a version of the track titled "Well Done 2" on a mixtape along with the same name. Jim Jones also released a freestyle.

== Track listing ==
Digital single
| No. | Title | Writer(s) | Producer(s) | Length |
|---|---|---|---|---|
| 1. | "John" (featuring Rick Ross) | Dwayne Carter, Jr., William Leonard Roberts II | Ayo the Producer | 4:47 |

== Charts and certifications ==
=== Weekly charts ===
| Chart (2011) | Peak position |
|---|---|
| US Billboard Hot 100 | 22 |
| US Hot R&B/Hip-Hop Songs (Billboard) | 19 |
| US Hot Rap Songs (Billboard) | 12 |
| US Rhythmic Airplay (Billboard) | 30 |

=== Year-end charts ===
| Chart (2011) | Position |
|---|---|
| US Hot R&B/Hip-Hop Songs (Billboard) | 64 |

=== Certifications ===
| Region | Certification | Certified units/sales |
|---|---|---|
| United States (RIAA) | 2× Platinum | 2,000,000^{‡} |
^{‡} Sales+streaming figures based on certification alone.
