= Almighty Jay =

American rapper (born 1998)

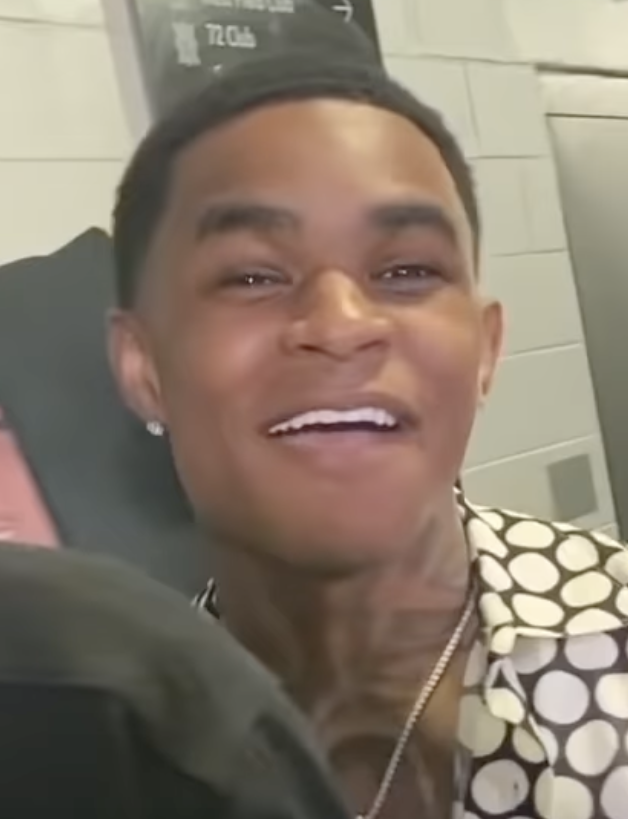
- Almighty Jay in 2021

Background information
- Born: Jay Gerard Bradley; August 6, 1998 (age 28); Galveston, Texas, U.S.
- Genres: Hip hop; trap
- Occupations: Rapper; actor; singer; songwriter; YouTuber
- Years active: 2015–present
- Labels: Atlantic; N2L
- Formerly of: YBN

Jay Gerard Bradley (born August 6, 1998), known professionally as Almighty Jay or jay! (formerly YBN Almighty Jay), is an American rapper. He was part of the YBN collective before their disbandment in August 2020. He is best known for singles such as "Chopsticks", "Bread Winners", and "No Hook".

== Career ==
Bradley started gaining traction after he released the singles "Chopsticks" and "No Hook", the latter of which featured fellow rapper and friend YBN Nahmir. Both tracks earned millions of views on YouTube.

In February 2018, Rich the Kid signed Bradley to his label, Rich Forever Music. In March 2018, he and Rich the Kid had a fall out when Rich the Kid released a song called Back Quick without Bradley's permission. In April 2018, he did an interview with DJ Akademiks saying he was never signed with the label.

== Personal life ==
Bradley started dating model Blac Chyna in February 2018, but they split in June that same year.

Bradley dated rapper DreamDoll from March to August 2019.

In March 2019, Bradley was attacked in New York City, where his money and chains were taken. He was also stomped on and stabbed several times. He reportedly received over 300 stitches after the incident, and addressed the attack on his track "Let Me Breathe".

== Discography ==
=== Mixtapes ===
| Title | Mixtape details | Peak chart positions | | | Certifications |
| Title | Mixtape details | US | US R&B/HH | CAN | Certifications |
|---|---|---|---|---|---|
| YBN: The Mixtape (with YBN Nahmir and Cordae) | Released: September 7, 2018; Label: Atlantic, Art@War; Format: Digital download, streaming | 21 | 13 | 19 | RIAA: Gold |
| Battling My Spirit | Released: March 5, 2021; Label: Atlantic; Format: Digital download, streaming | — | — | — | |

=== EPs ===
| Title | Album details |
|---|---|
| Almighty: The EP | Released: August 6, 2021; Label: N2L Records; Format: Digital download, streaming |

=== Singles ===
| Title | Year | Album |
|---|---|---|
| "No Hook" (with YBN Nahmir) | 2017 | Non-album single |
| "Bread Winners" (with YBN and YBN Nahmir) | 2018 | YBN: The Mixtape |
| "Chopsticks" (solo or remix featuring Rich the Kid) | 2018 | YBN: The Mixtape |
| "2 Tone Drip" | 2018 | YBN: The Mixtape |
| "Let Me Breathe" | 2019 | Non-album singles |
| "God Save Me" | 2019 | Non-album singles |
| "Spaceship" | 2019 | Non-album singles |
| "Red Light" (with DC the Don and DDG) | 2020 | Come As You Are |
| "Ooouuu" (featuring Blac Youngsta) | 2020 | Non-album single |
| "Come Home" (with 24hrs and Futuristic) | 2020 | Featuristic |
| "Shoutout to My Dentist" | 2020 | Battling My Spirit |
| "Bring Out the Hoochies" | 2020 | Battling My Spirit |
| "Battling My Spirit" | 2021 | Battling My Spirit |
