= Dude 'n Nem =

American hip hop group

- Origin: Chicago, Illinois
- Genres: Hip hop, ghetto house, Chicago house
- Years active: 1999–2013
- Label: RD Entertainment / The Orchard
- Members: Trygic; Upmost

Dude 'n Nem was an American hip hop duo consisting of Chicago rappers Trygic and Upmost.

The duo signed to TVT Records and released the single "Watch My Feet" in 2007. The single peaked at number 20 on the US Billboard Bubbling Under R&B/Hip-Hop Singles chart. Pitchfork Media listed "Watch My Feet" as the fiftieth best track of 2007. The song was also featured on the soundtrack to Need for Speed: ProStreet. Their debut studio album, Tinted Incubators, was released in October 2007. In 2008, the duo were featured on rapper Yung Berg's single "Do That There".

== Discography ==
=== Studio albums ===
List of studio albums
| Title | Album details |
|---|---|
| Tinted Incubators | Release: October 9, 2007 (US); Label: TVT; Formats: CD, digital download |

=== Singles ===
List of singles, with selected chart positions, showing year released and album name
| Title | Year | Peak chart positions | Album |
| Title | Year | US R&B | Album |
|---|---|---|---|
| "Watch My Feet"^{[A]} | 2007 | 120 | Tinted Incubators |
| "Do That There"^{[B]} (Yung Berg featuring Dude 'n Nem) | 2008 | 124 | Look What You Made Me |

=== Notes ===
- A "Watch My Feet" did not enter the Hot R&B/Hip-Hop Songs chart, but peaked at number 20 on the Bubbling Under R&B/Hip-Hop Singles chart, which acts as an extension to the R&B/Hip-Hop Songs chart.
- B "Do That There" did not enter the Hot R&B/Hip-Hop Songs chart, but peaked at number 24 on the Bubbling Under R&B/Hip-Hop Singles chart, which acts as an extension to the R&B/Hip-Hop Songs chart.
