= Bounce Out with That =

Single by YBN Nahmir

from the album YBN: The Mixtape
- Released: January 24, 2018
- Length: 1:37
- Label: Self-released
- Songwriter: Nicholas Simmons
- Producer: Hoodzone Productions

YBN Nahmir singles chronology
"Hi Bich (Remix)" (2018)	"Bounce Out with That" (2018)	"1942" (2018)

Music video
- "Bounce Out with That" on YouTube

"Bounce Out with That" is a song by American rapper YBN Nahmir. The track was released on January 24, 2018, and peaked at number one on the Bubbling Under Hot 100 chart and at number 76 on the Canadian Hot 100.

The track was certified Gold on August 16, 2018, and Platinum on December 14, 2018.

== Music video ==
The music video was released alongside the track on January 24, 2018, with guest appearances from the likes of PnB Rock, Fatboy SSE, and more. Lindsey India of XXL called the music video "turnt up".

== Critical reception ==
Mitch Findlay of HotNewHipHop called the song "a solid introduction for those looking to find out what YBN Nahmir is about", and said the instrumental was "bouncy".

== Charts ==
Chart (2018)	Peak position
Canada (Canadian Hot 100)	76
US Bubbling Under Hot 100 Singles (Billboard)	1
US Hot R&B/Hip-Hop Songs (Billboard)	47

== Certifications ==
Region	Certification	Certified units/sales
Canada (Music Canada)	2× Platinum	160,000^{‡}
New Zealand (RMNZ)	Gold	15,000^{‡}
United States (RIAA)	2× Platinum	2,000,000^{‡}
^{‡} Sales+streaming figures based on certification alone.
