= Driicky Graham =

American rapper

- Born: Nasir Frederick Graham; November 23, 1991 (age 34); Newark, New Jersey, United States
- Genres: Hip hop
- Occupations: Rapper, songwriter
- Years active: 2012–present
- Labels: E1 Music, YFM

Nasir Frederick Graham (born November 23, 1991), better known by his stage name Driicky Graham, is an American rapper. He was previously signed to E1 Music, but he is now independent.

== Early life ==
Driicky Graham was born Nasir Frederick Graham in UMDNJ hospital. He is the son of Derrick "The Sharpshooter" Graham, a former light middleweight boxing champion, and Joylette Bullock, an educator. Graham and his family grew up in Newark, New Jersey. His parents separated when he was two. At the age of seven, he moved with his mother to Oxford, North Carolina. In 1994, at the age of three, Graham appeared in the music video to the Lords of the Underground single "Tic Toc". This was his first experience in the industry which later inspired him to jump start his career in hip hop music.

== Music career ==
Graham began rapping at the age of 14, while always passionate about his craft, he did not view it as a serious career option until he signed to the independent record label Nu World Era Music Group when he turned 18. After building up a strong online following, Graham achieved commercial success in 2012 with his single "Snapbacks & Tattoos", which received airplay on radio stations. Following the success of "Snapbacks & Tattoos", many major record labels attempted to sign Graham, including Epic and Interscope: however, Graham instead decided to sign to independent label E1 Music His first mixtape, Ya Gotta Start Somewhere, was released on June 26, 2012. Graham also made an appearance on a BET Cypher during the 2012 BET Hip Hop Awards in October alongside ASAP Rocky, Angel Haze, Childish Gambino and Joey Badass His second mixtape, "The Experience Of Fred Neech" or "EFN" was released December 15, 2014.

== Discography ==
=== Albums ===
==== Studio albums ====
List of albums, with selected information
Title	Album details
Success by the Graham	Released: TBD; Label: E1 Music; Formats: CD, digital download

==== Mixtapes ====
List of albums, with selected information
Title	Album details
Ya Gotta Start Somewhere	Released: June 26, 2012; Label: Nu World Era, E1; Formats: Digital download

=== Singles ===
List of singles, with selected chart positions, showing year released and album name
Title	Year	Peak chart positions			Certifications	Album
Title	Year	US	US R&B	US Rap	Certifications	Album
"Snapbacks & Tattoos" (solo or remix featuring Roscoe Dash, French Montana and Cash Out)	2012	73	23	12	RIAA: Gold	Non-album single
"—" denotes a recording that did not chart.
