= Sexy Lady (Yung Berg song) =

Single by Yung Berg featuring Junior

from the album Almost Famous: The Sexy Lady EP and Look What You Made Me
- Released: April 3, 2007
- Recorded: 2007
- Genre: Hip-hop
- Length: 3:48
- Label: Koch; Epic; Poe Boy; Slip-n-Slide
- Songwriters: Christian Ward; Robert Watson; John Barry; Donald Black; Douglas Davis; Ricky Walters; Victor Molina
- Producer: Rob Holladay

Yung Berg singles chronology
"Sexy Lady" (2007)	"Sexy Can I" (2007)

"Sexy Lady" is the first single by Yung Berg. It appears on his Almost Famous: The Sexy Lady EP and his first album, Look What You Made Me. Released in 2007, it samples the London Symphony Orchestra's version of "Diamonds Are Forever", and the chorus is an interpolation of Millie Jackson's "Slow Tongue". The single entered the Billboard Hot 100 at number 99 and peaked at number 18. The music video includes cameos by actress Drew Sidora and singer Kat DeLuna. At the end of the video, Yung Berg's song "Where Do We Go" can also be heard.

== Remix ==
The official remix of the song features Jim Jones and Rich Boy. Another remix has DJ Khaled and appears on his EP. In the music video, Rich Boy has a different verse and there are cameos from Juelz Santana.

== Charts ==
=== Weekly charts ===
Chart (2007)	Peak position
US Billboard Hot 100	18
US Hot R&B/Hip-Hop Songs (Billboard)	16
US Hot Rap Songs (Billboard)	6
US Pop Airplay (Billboard)	23
US Rhythmic Airplay (Billboard)	12

=== Year-end charts ===
Chart (2007)	Position
US Hot R&B/Hip-Hop Songs (Billboard)	72
