= Sexy Can I =

2007 single by Ray J

Single by Ray J featuring Yung Berg

from the album All I Feel and Look What You Made Me
- Released: October 23, 2007
- Genre: R&B
- Length: 3:24
- Label: Knockout; Deja 34; Epic; Koch
- Songwriters: William Norwood; Christian Ward; Noel Fisher; Victor Carraway
- Producer: Detail

Ray J singles chronology
"Let's Play House" (2006)	"Sexy Can I" (2007)	"You Know Me" (2007)

Yung Berg singles chronology
"Sexy Lady" (2007)	"Sexy Can I" (2007)	"Do That There" (2008)

Audio sample
- file; help

"Sexy Can I" is the first single from Ray J's fourth studio album, All I Feel (2008). It was produced by Detail and features rapper Yung Berg, whose debut album Look What You Made Me also includes the track. The song was released on October 23, 2007, and peaked at number three on the US Billboard Hot 100.

== Chart performance ==
On the issue date of February 16, 2008, the single debuted on the Billboard Hot 100 at number 77 and climbed to peak at number 3 on the chart week of late 2007–2008 (after reaching the top 40 on February 19, 2008), spending over three months in the Billboard Top 10. It is both Ray J's and Yung Berg's first top five single on the Billboard Hot 100. It has been certified Platinum by the Recording Industry Association of America (RIAA). The official remix which features Sheek Louch is on the soundtrack to Ray J's reality show For the Love of Ray J.

== Music video ==
Professional basketball player Shaquille O'Neal makes a cameo in the music video. A second version of the video was shot of Yung Berg and Ray J performing the song, while a video model watches on a computer, in which the D.E.Y. appears. The music video was directed by R. Malcolm Jones and was filmed in Miami, Florida.

== Charts ==
=== Weekly charts ===
Chart (2008)	Peak position
Canada Hot 100 (Billboard)	20
New Zealand (Recorded Music NZ)	10
UK Singles (Official Charts)	66
US Billboard Hot 100	3
US Hot R&B/Hip-Hop Songs (Billboard)	4
US Pop Airplay (Billboard)	2
US Rhythmic Airplay (Billboard)	1

=== Year-end charts ===
Chart (2008)	Position
Canada (Canadian Hot 100)	80
UK Urban (Music Week)	8
US Billboard Hot 100	11
US Hot R&B/Hip-Hop Songs (Billboard)	30
US Mainstream Top 40 (Billboard)	23
US Rhythmic (Billboard)	3

== Certifications ==
Region	Certification	Certified units/sales
Canada (Music Canada)	Gold	20,000^{*}
New Zealand (RMNZ)	Platinum	30,000^{‡}
United States (RIAA)	Platinum	1,000,000^{*}
United States (RIAA) Mastertone	Gold	500,000^{*}
^{*} Sales figures based on certification alone.^{‡} Sales+streaming figures based on certification alone.

== Release history ==
Region	Date	Format(s)	Label(s)	Ref.
United States	October 23, 2007	Digital download	Koch	
United States	November 13, 2007	Rhythmic radio	Knockout; Koch	
United States	December 4, 2007	Contemporary hit radio	Koch; Epic	
