= Look What You Made Me =

Studio album by Yung Berg
- Released: August 12, 2008 (U.S.)
- Genre: Hip hop
- Length: 1:00:44
- Labels: Yung Boss; Koch; Epic
- Producers: Rob Holladay; JFK; Noel "Detail" Fisher; Boogz; Mr. Collipark; Xcel; Young Yonny

Yung Berg chronology
Almost Famous: The Sexy Lady EP (2007)	Look What You Made Me (2008)	Yung Boss Or Die Vol. 1 (2008)

Singles from Look What You Made Me
- 1. "Sexy Lady" Released: April 3, 2007; 2. "Do That There" Released: March 25, 2008; 3. "The Business" Released: May 13, 2008

Professional ratings
Aggregate scores
Source	Rating
Metacritic	55/100
Review scores
Source	Rating
AllMusic	3/5 stars
RapReviews	7/10 stars

Look What You Made Me is the debut studio album by American rapper Yung Berg.

Released on August 12, 2008 under Yung Boss Music Group, Epic Records and Koch Records, it is the only studio album to be released under the Yung Berg alias and also the only album that he has recorded as a performing rapper before transitioning to record production under the alias, Hitmaka.

Production was handled by Rob Holladay, Jason 'JFK' Fleming, Boogz, Detail, Mr. Collipark, Xcel and Young Yonny. It features guest appearances from Casha Darjean, Amerie, K. Young, Lloyd, Ray J, Trey Songz and Twista among others. The album debuted at #20 on the US Billboard 200 albums chart selling 19,000 copies in its first week.

== Singles ==
The first single from the album was "Sexy Lady" featuring Junior; peaking at #18 on the Billboard Hot 100 it was included on the prequel EP, Almost Famous (subtitled The Sexy Lady EP). Despite the single being released over sixteen months before the album, Berg confirmed in an interview with fellow Chicago native and radio personality DJ Z that it would still be included on the album.

"Sexy Can I"
Ray J featuring Yung Berg perform "Sexy Can I" from All I Feel and Look What You Made Me

The single "Sexy Can I" was included in the album even though it also is the first single from Ray J's fourth studio album All I Feel (released April 8, 2008), it peaked at #3 on the Hot 100, was certified 2× Platinum by the RIAA, and is the most successful single for both Ray J and Yung Berg to date.

Soon after, Berg released a promotional street single, entitled "Do That There", produced by fellow Chicagoan Xcel (known for producing Shawnna's "Gettin' Some"), it featured a sample from Dude 'n Nem's single "Watch My Feet" and had them credited as featured artists. It is Yung Berg's least successful single to date, only peaking at #125 on the Hot R&B/Hip-Hop Songs chart. Yung Berg said he hoped to release a remix featuring 50 Cent, Twista and Red Cafe. The intro of the song is a "diss" to the rapper Bow Wow. However, Yung Berg later said in an interview that they have ended their disagreement.

The second official single came on May 13, 2008, with the release of "The Business". Assisted by his first Yung Boss Music Group signee and former Candy Hill lead singer Casha, it has entered the Hot 100, charting at #33 so far.

== Track listing ==
No.	Title	Producer(s)	Length
1.	"Intro"		2:06
2.	"Look What You Made Me" (featuring K-Young)	Rob Holladay	4:20
3.	"Sexy Can I" (featuring Ray J)	Detail	3:25
4.	"Do That There" (featuring Dude 'n Nem)	Xcel	3:50
5.	"The Business" (featuring Casha Garcia)	Rob Holladay	4:13
6.	"Interlude"		1:11
7.	"Where Do We Go" (featuring Twista)	JFK	4:48
8.	"Sexy Lady" (featuring Junior)	Rob Holladay	3:48
9.	"One Night" (featuring Trey Songz)	JFK	3:41
10.	"Manager" (featuring Lloyd)	Mr. Collipark	3:55
11.	"Interlude"		1:55
12.	"If You Only Knew" (featuring Casha Garcia)	JFK	4:11
13.	"Outerspace"	Rob Holladay	3:49
14.	"Get Your Number" (featuring Amerie)	Boogz	4:48
15.	"Victory Lap" (featuring Eve & Collie Buddz)	Rob Holladay	10:44
Total length:			1:00:44

== Charts ==
Chart (2008)	Peak position
US Billboard 200	20
US Top R&B/Hip-Hop Albums (Billboard)	3
US Top Rap Albums (Billboard)	2

=== Singles ===
"Do That There"
Chart (2008)	Peak position
U.S. Billboard Bubbling Under R&B/Hip-Hop Singles	24
