= Hitmaka =

American record producer (born 1985)

Yung Berg
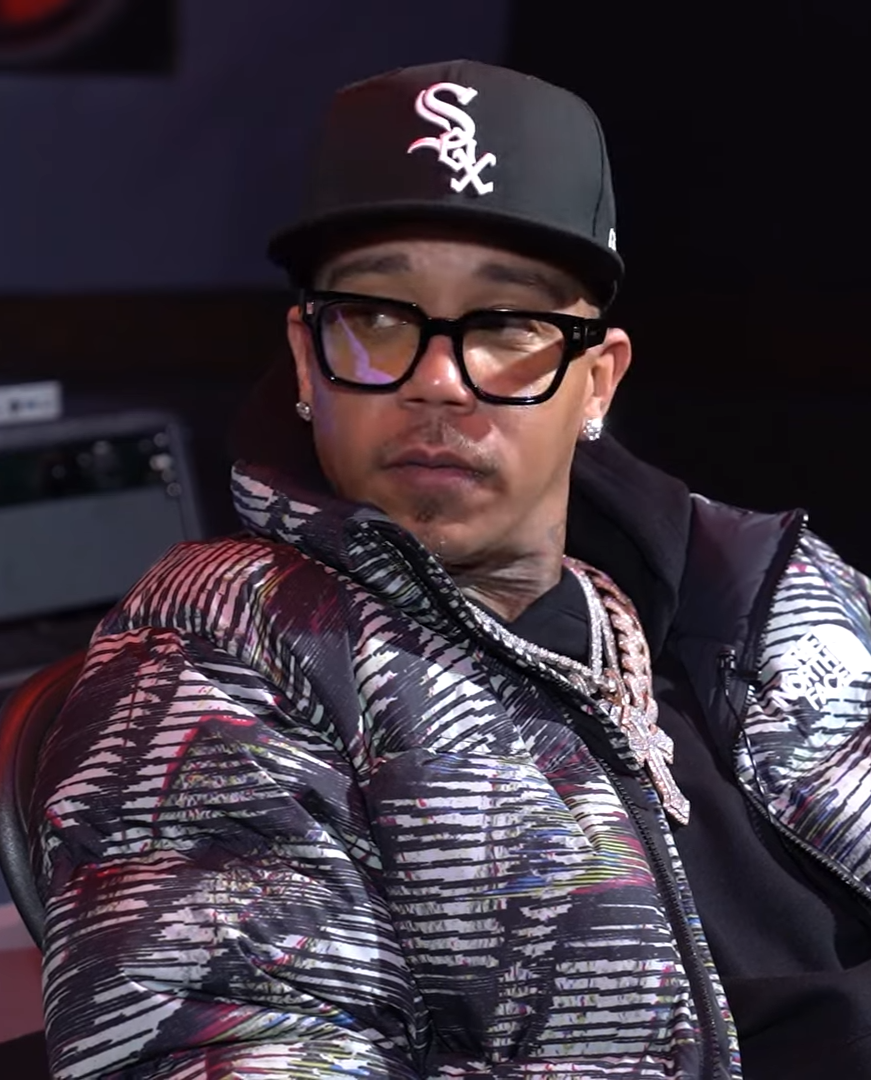
- Ward in 2024

Background information
- Also known as: Iceberg; Yung Berg
- Born: Christian Ward; September 9, 1985 (age 41); Chicago, Illinois, U.S.
- Genres: Hip-hop; trap; R&B
- Occupations: Record producer; rapper; songwriter; music executive
- Years active: 2001–present
- Labels: Makasound; Empire; Yung Fly Movement; Atlantic; Epic; Koch; Bloodline; Yung Boss
- Children: 2

Christian Ward (born September 9, 1985), known professionally as Hitmaka, is an American record producer.

Ward began rapping under the stage name Iceberg in 2001, at the age of 15. His career was cut short, due to his time at a military-based boarding school. Six years later, he signed with Epic Records and adopted the stage name Yung Berg. His 2007 debut single, "Sexy Lady", peaked at number 18 on the Billboard Hot 100, while its 2008 follow-up, "The Business", peaked at number 33. He was featured on Ray J's single, "Sexy Can I", that same year; the song peaked within the chart's top five; all of which preceded the release of his debut studio album, Look What You Made Me (2008), his only studio album to be released during his tenure as a rapper. Despite unfavorable critical reception, it peaked at number 20 on the Billboard 200. After releasing several follow-up mixtapes and singles that failed to chart, he transitioned from recording in favor of a career in music production by 2014.

Ward's production work was commercially successful. Since the 2010s, he has been credited on the Billboard Hot 100-top 40 singles "Bounce Back" by Big Sean, "John" by Lil Wayne, "Party" by Chris Brown, "Look Back at It" by A Boogie wit da Hoodie, "Dangerous" by Meek Mill, and "Plan B" by Megan Thee Stallion. In 2019, he was appointed the executive vice president of A&R at Atlantic Records. A year later, he was given the same position for Empire Distribution.

== Early life ==
Christian Ward was born on September 9, 1985, in Chicago, Illinois.

== Career ==
=== 2001–2005: Career beginnings and boarding school ===
In January 2001, Ward signed to rapper DMX's imprint, Bloodline Records. He made his debut on the soundtrack to the film, Exit Wounds, on the song, "Dog 4 Life" under the alias, Iceberg. In the next few months, his experiences with DMX became concerning including sexual intercourse, drug addiction and heavy cannabis or alcohol usage, resultant of a lack of guidance. Ward, despite the falling out, was gifted a puppy by the rapper.

After he failed to receive support from DMX, he remained a signed artist on Bloodline, but moved from a studio in Toronto, Ontario to Edgewater, New Jersey, to self-produce a planned studio album for the label, while working with other producers (including his former mentors, Boogz da Beast and Tricky Stewart). Ward would then receive pager messages from his now-estranged mother, demanding that he meet her at a Red Lobster in Chicago. At the time, he was in a studio session with the then-unknown LEP Bogus Boys and later at a shopping mall, buying clothing and jewelry. Upon visiting his mother at Red Lobster, he was tricked into being sent away in a van and shifted from Chicago's O'Hare International Airport to Spring Creek Lodge Academy, a now-closed military boarding school in Thompson Falls, Montana in July 2001. His father, who is no longer in contact with Ward, then demanded DMX to release him from his Bloodline imprint, out of concern that Ward's association would incite a controversial hip-hop criminal lifestyle, considering DMX's own legal issues. He initially failed the first test while at Spring Creek, but later improved a year and half later, before being released from the school in late 2002.

He moved to Los Angeles, California, after earning his GED in 2003; he previously attended Chicago Vocational High School and Curie Metropolitan High School. In 2005, Ward worked as a hype man and recording assistant for former Disturbing tha Peace member and fellow Chicagoan Shawnna.

=== 2007–2010: Rap career ===
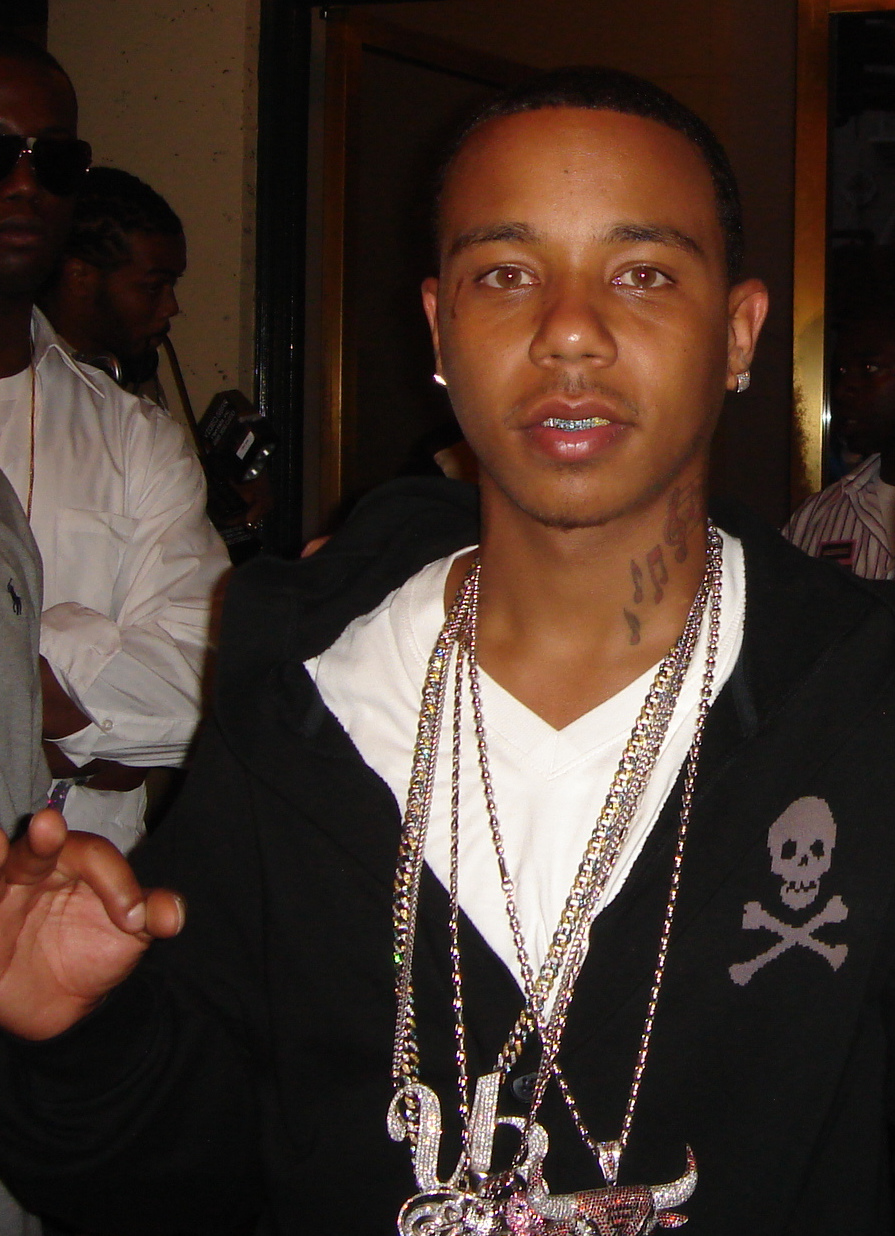
Ward in 2007

Released on April 3, 2007, Ward's debut single, "Sexy Lady", which featured R&B singer Junior, became a hit on Los Angeles urban radio. "Sexy Lady" peaked at number 18 on the Billboard Hot 100. Among many labels that approached him, he signed with Epic Records. Ward's six-track EP, Almost Famous: The Sexy Lady EP, was released on July 24, 2007. Later that year, Ward made a cameo in the music video for singer Kat DeLuna's debut single "Whine Up". Ward recorded a song with Lil Wayne and Brisco titled "Bitch Please", which was released in November 2007.

In December 2007, Ward released another single "Sexy Can I", a collaboration with singer Ray J. The first single for his debut album, "Do That There" (featuring Dude 'n Nem), was followed by "The Business" (featuring R&B artist Casha Darjean), which peaked at number 33 on the Billboard Hot 100. On August 12, 2008, Ward released his debut studio album and his only album as a rapper to date, Look What You Made Me. It would chart at number 20 on the Billboard 200 and at number two on the Top Rap Albums chart.

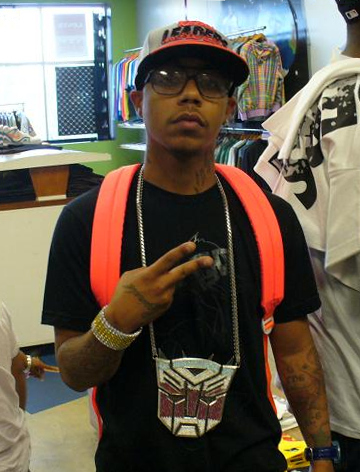
Ward in 2008

In December 2008, Ward began casting black women of certain skin tones "to showcase beauty of all races" for a potential reality show that he would host. The potentially-titled Back to Business was never released as planned. In 2009, Ward formed the production group, the Dream Team with his older brother, K-Young, and producer Rob Holladay.

=== 2010–present: Transition to production and success ===
In 2010, Ward quietly ended his rap career and focused more on producing songs for other artists. His major placement was in 2011, when he was credited (alongside Rob Holladay and Polow da Don) as the co-producer for rapper Lil Wayne's single, "John", featuring Rick Ross. He was later credited as producer or co-composer on other singles that followed: Driicky Graham's "Snapbacks & Tattoos" (2012), Tamar Braxton's "The One" (2013), and DJ Infamous' "Double Cup" (2014).

In mid-2014, Ward officially changed his alias to Hitmaka, referencing his revamp as a full-time music producer. His first outing under the Hitmaka alias was for Nicki Minaj's third studio album, The Pinkprint, which was released on December 15, 2014. Ward is credited as co-producer on the tracks "Want Some More", "Buy a Heart", and "Shanghai". Later that year, Ward appeared on the first season of the VH1 reality series, Love & Hip Hop: Hollywood, a California spinoff of the Love & Hip Hop franchise. The series loosely followed events in his personal life. On November 9, 2014, it was announced by VH1 that they had fired Ward from Love & Hip Hop: Hollywood, due to him being arrested for allegedly assaulting his fellow castmate and former girlfriend, Masika Kalysha.

Throughout the five-year span, he focused more on production throughout, producing and composing for Jeremih ("Giv No Fuks", "Worthy" and "I Think of You"), Chris Brown ("Party"), K. Michelle ("Ain't You"), Big Sean ("Bounce Back"), Kid Ink ("Nasty" and "F with U"), Ty Dolla Sign ("Ex" and "Pineapple"), A Boogie wit da Hoodie ("Look Back at It"), Meek Mill ("Dangerous") and 2 Chainz ("Rule the World"). He also produced a single, "Thot Box", featuring A Boogie wit da Hoodie, 2 Chainz, Tyga, YBN Nahmir and Meek Mill.

In August 2019, Ward was given the position of executive vice president of urban A&R at Atlantic Records. In late 2020, Ward helmed the executive production duties for rapper T.I.'s eleventh album, The L.I.B.R.A., upon its release that October. That same year, he (along with Cardiak) co-produced Trey Songz and Summer Walker's "Back Home", a title track from the former's eighth studio album, Back Home, which charted at number twelve on the Billboard Hot R&B/Hip-Hop Airplay chart.

On February 11, 2021, Ward released a collaborative album with singer-songwriter Eric Bellinger, 1-(800)-HIT-EAZY, which would be followed two years later by a sequel, Line 2, released on February 16, 2023.

Throughout 2021, he produced numerous tracks for singer/rapper Tink and collaborated with OG Parker to produce Yung Bleu's single, "Baddest". That September, he was appointed the vice president of A&R at Empire Distribution. Within this position, he reports to founder Ghazi Shami and president (Chris Brown's former manager) Tina Davis. In October 2022, he won a BET Hip Hop Award for Producer of the Year.

In 2023, Ward continued producing for various artists including Chloe Bailey ("How Does It Feel"), 2 Chainz and Lil Wayne ("Transparency"), Chris Brown ("Angel Numbers / Ten Toes") and in 2025, Bow Wow ("Use Me").

== Personal life ==
=== Legal issues ===
In October 2015, Ward was ordered to pay $100,000 in back child support for his child with Brandy Flint. The ruling was part of a default judgement after he failed to appear in an Illinois court to respond to charges. In December 2017, Ward was considered a delinquent parent by the Illinois Department of Healthcare and Family Services, which has published information on Ward's failure to pay child support. At the time, Ward's amount owed in past-due child support is $104,962 for one child.

=== Robbery victim ===
On August 23, 2008, it was reported that Ward had been ambushed in a robbery, which his signature "Transformers chain" was stolen. On December 16, 2011, Ward explained the altercation, saying "I was like 30 deep, I went in the club and I went to the back because I had the number one record at the time". Ward later claimed that the chain was not important to him.

On March 20, 2011, during an interview, Ward announced that he was done with wearing flashy jewelry stating,

On some real shit back in the day when I was buying those big ass chains and shit, I felt like that was a part of me being Yung Berg. But me growing up and being Christian, being Mr. Ward, and who I really I am, I toned down. I'm not going to be with the big gaudy chains because people would look and they would say 'Well, this nigga still ain't learn his lesson.' I learned my lesson. I'm going to have jewelry but it's going to be more upscale and common. It's not going to be catching just the nigga eye.

== Discography ==
Studio albums

- Look What You Made Me (as Yung Berg) (2008)

Collaborative albums

- 1-800-HIT-EAZY (with Eric Bellinger) (2021)
- 1-800-HIT-EAZY: Line 2 (with Eric Bellinger) (2023)
- The Purple Passion (with Icewear Vezzo) (2026)

== Filmography ==
=== Television ===
Year	Film	Role	Notes
2014	Love & Hip Hop: Hollywood	Himself	
