= Jealous (Beyoncé song) =

Song by Beyoncé released in 2013

Song by Beyoncé

from the album Beyoncé
- Released: December 13, 2013
- Recorded: 2013
- Studio: Jungle City and Oven (New York City)
- Genre: Pop; R&B
- Length: 3:04
- Label: Parkwood; Columbia
- Songwriters: Beyoncé Knowles; Noel "Detail" Fisher; Andre Eric Proctor; Lyrica Anderson; Brian Soko; Rasool Diaz; Jordy "Boots" Asher
- Producers: Detail; Beyoncé Knowles

Music video
- "Jealous" on YouTube

"Jealous" is a song by American singer Beyoncé from her fifth studio album, Beyoncé (2013). The song was written by Beyoncé, Detail, Andre Eric Proctor, Lyrica Anderson, Brian Soko and its additional producers Rasool Diaz and Boots. Lyrically, "Jealous" is a self-referential song discussing feelings of jealousy, suspicion, and revenge directed at a present love interest.

A music video for the song was directed by Beyoncé along with Francesco Carrozzini and Todd Tours and filmed in New York City in November 2013. It was released through the iTunes Store on December 13, 2013, on the album itself. The visual was shot as a sequel to the previous song on the album, "Partition" and it shows Beyoncé in different sets — alone at home waiting for her partner to come to dinner, at a party, and out in the streets in search for him. Beyoncé performed "Jealous" live at the 2014 MTV Video Music Awards during a medley consisting of songs from her self-titled album.

== Background ==
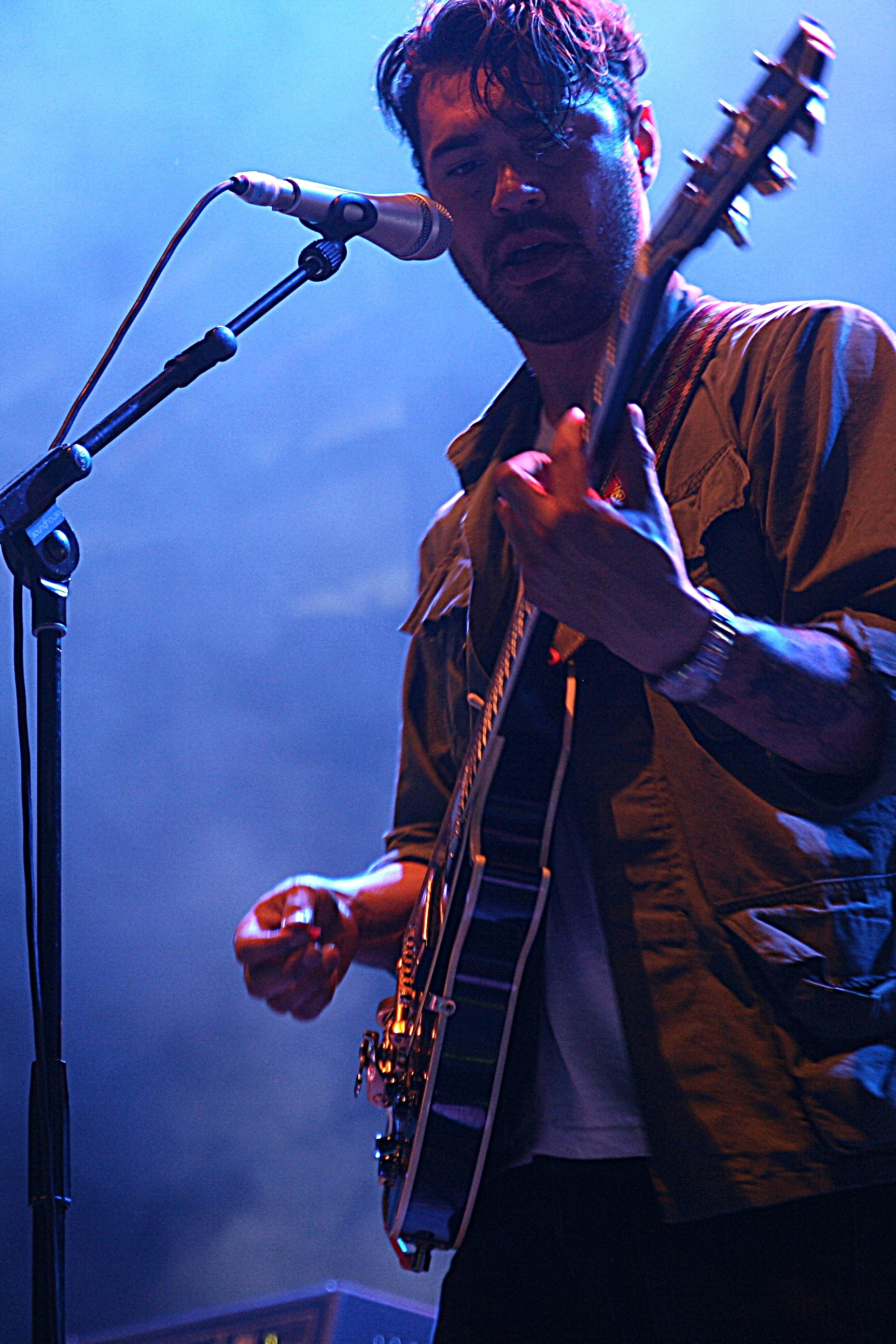
Hanni El Khatib's song "Roach Cock" served as an inspiration for "Jealous".

"Jealous" was written with Detail, Lyrica Anderson, Boots, Andre Eric Proctor, Brian Soko, and Rasool Diaz. Beyoncé and Detail also served as its producers with contributions by Boots, Hit-Boy, Hazebanga and Proctor who were credited as additional producers. Beyoncé further served as the vocal producer of the track which also included backing vocals sung by Boots. "Jealous" was recorded in New York City at Jungle City Studios and Oven Studios with guidance from Stuart White. The audio engineering was finished by Ramon Rivas and Rob Suchecki with assistance by Carlos Perezdeanda, while the mixing was done by Tony Maserati at Mirrorball Studios, North Hollywood, California. All instruments in the song were provided by Boots.

"Jealous" was initially conceived when Boots first saw it and the song consisted of "some drums and that synth". He added a "high" melody containing the lines "If you're keeping your promise I'm keeping mine" as he felt it seemed "like a shame something more melodic didn't happen in the song". When Beyoncé's creative team was widely searching for the concept of the song's music video, the singer sent a clip of a song called "Roach Cock" by Hanni El Khatib to Boots. Inspired by its feel, she requested from him to bring elements of that track to "Jealous". He added a "gnarly fuzz guitar ripping in the background" to the song also present in its final version. Beyoncé explained the meaning of "Jealous" on her iTunes Radio channel, "[It's] a song about being human. We all get jealous. It doesn't matter who you are. At some point, it's just inevitable."

== Composition ==
"Jealous" is a power ballad, further described as a "silky slow jam". Consequence of Sound writer Chris Bosman found elements of "slow down radio R&B to molasses RPMs" in its composition. The song opens with distant yelps heard in the background and continues with a slow beat which is distorted and contains an echoing sound throughout. A "wall of crashing sounds" and backing vocals are also heard. "Jealous" further displays "genre diversity, vocal range and a penchant of musical experimentation" while exploring a brooding beat by mixing different tones and styles throughout. Billboard writers Andrew Hampp and Erika Ramirez found the vibe of the song reminiscent to works by Lana Del Rey, Jeff Bhasker, and Emile Haynie due to its brooding beat. Michael Cragg from The Guardian also compared "Jealous" and its lyrics portraying romance with materials by Del Rey noting that it showed the singer as a "spurned lover". Chris Kelly of Fact noted that the song's theme about equality in relationships was similar to her single "If I Were a Boy" (2008). The Irish Times editor Una Mullally felt the song offered Robyn-esque sentiments and added that it recalls Beyoncé's own song, "Halo" (2008). Tim Finney from Complex felt that the singer adopted a conversational, "talk-over-the beat" vocal style in the song. Finney argued she adopted that style to convey "unmediated spontaneity or truth-telling", particularly during the "rueful admission" in the lines, "I know that I'm being hateful but that ain't nothin'."

"Jealous" is a self-referential song as Beyoncé tries to make her love interest envious. Lyrically, the song speaks about "promises, suspicion and potential revenge". Its lyrics illustrate a woman getting "fierce" when taken for granted as stated by Greg Kot of the Chicago Tribune. She questions the loyalty of her male love interest and he is believed to be cheating on her with another woman. Claire Lobendfeld of Complex interpreted the song as being about a person fighting with his own feelings of jealousy. She felt that instead of flirting with other people during a night out to make a lover jealous, the protagonist goes for a "downtrodden" direction and reconnects with old people from her past.

"Jealous"
An 18-second sample of the bridge of "Jealous" during which a brooding beat accompanies the singer's vocals as well as the distant yelps heard in the background.

The song opens with the singer using sexually explicit language to describe an evening at her home where she is cooking a meal for her love interest while being naked and alone, "I'm in my penthouse half-naked / I cook this meal for you naked". Idolator's Mike Wass interpreted these lines as showing the singer's "emotional shortcomings". The Atlantic editor Nolan Feeney felt that these lines showcased many of the singer's recurring themes present on her other albums — "the empowerment that comes with being a strong, independent woman, and the fulfillment that comes with love and marriage". Finney wrote that during the beginning of the song, Beyoncé seemed excited about her role as a wife in the kitchen, but afterwards as the events go wrong and she is left alone, the same role feels oppressive. The singer continues singing lines about jealousy and realizes her partner will not come: "I wish you were me/ So you could feel this feeling/ I never broke one promise, and I know when you're not honest." After the chorus, Beyoncé sings the lines "Sometimes I want to walk in your shoes, do the type of things I never ever do. I take one look in the mirror, and I say to myself, 'Baby girl, you can't survive like this.'" The protagonist can not tolerate the fact she has been underappreciated and goes on to put on a "freakum dress out my closet" (a reference to her own song "Freakum Dress" (2006)) and stay the night outside further singing about her own attractiveness. As she continues to describe her love–hate relationship detailing her emotions, Beyoncé sings the song's bridge:

And I hate you for your lies and your covers
And I hate us for making good love to each other
And I love making you jealous but don't judge me
And I know that I'm being hateful but that ain't nothing
That ain't nothing
I'm just jealous
I'm just human
Don't judge me

== Critical reception ==
Ludovic Hunter-Tilney from the Financial Times concluded the song was similar to Beyoncé's previously recorded ballads in the sense that it made her albums "uneven". However, he argued that "Jealous" had an "intriguing dynamic" between invincibility and vulnerability, with the latter being convincingly executed by the singer for the first time. Editor Caitlin White for the website The 405 found the song to offer a glimpse into the singer's flaws and insecurities. Similarly, James Montgomery writing for MTV News, felt that the song offered a view of the same states, adding, "she is not always perfect, a point she drives home on tracks like... 'Jealous'". A writer from the website Fuse concluded that the feeling of jealousy expressed in the song were rare for the singer, and added "we didn't even know [it] was an emotion she experienced". Mesfin Fekadu from the Associated Press noted the song to be "self-explanatory" and found the singer more honest than in her previous work. Kevin Fallon from The Daily Beast found the song's theme about jealousy to be relatable to many people and different from the rest of the album's central theme about sex. Claire Lobenfeld of Complex felt "Jealous" took the album from its risqué nature to a "softer side", further describing it as a "grown-up sequel to 'Freakum Dress'".

Erika Ramirez and Andrew Hampp of Billboard felt that the song mixed "uncanny" styles and noted that as the chorus starts, listeners "can see Beyonce singing this from the stage surrounded by smoke machines." USA Today writer Elysa Gardner wrote that in "Jealous" along with "Haunted", the singer "embodies success and privilege on the surface, but there is a sense that her contentment is fragile". Entertainment Weekly writer Nick Catucci observed that the song "treat[s] relationships with the same raw instinct that suffuses her sex songs" on the album. Writing for Clash magazine, Mike Diver praised Beyoncé's vocal performance noting, "When Beyoncé truly unleashes her vocals on ballad-tempo moments... 'Jealous', she immediately casts long shadows over singers who might have tried to shift her from the top table of pop". Brittany Spanos of The Village Voice described the song as a "grown up version" of "If I Were a Boy" with lyrics about "persistent mistrust". Latifah Muhammad of BET deemed the song a "distant cousin" to "If I Were a Boy" and stated that its turning point comes during several lines of the bridge.

Philip Sherburne of Spin magazine wrote "[w]hile we're getting hyperbolic, 'Jealous' is the most uplifting take on invidiousness" since the song "Suspicious Minds" (1968). Jon Pareles, a New York Times writer called it an "accusatory anthem". Slant Magazine's Sal Cinquemani described "Jealous" as a "standout" ballad while Rolling Stone's Jon Dolan hailed it as a "monster" ballad. Nick McCormick of The Daily Telegraph wrote that despite the song lacked a lift off, "there is something impressively dramatic about the restraint she maintains in a song of emotional tension". Jody Rosen of Vulture, lauded the line "freakum dress out my closet", but noted, "I want more of a melody from a wronged-woman's-revenge anthem, but I suspect it's a grower". Philadelphia Media Network writer Dan DeLuca gave a more mixed review for the song writing that it was part of the slower material of the album which showed Beyoncé was not flawless.

Nolan Feeney of The Atlantic argued that "Jealous" was both one of the album's best songs and one of singer's most notable songs overall. Feeney felt that its message was interesting, particularly during the bridge, "It's not exactly an apology, and it's not exactly an admission that she's somehow responsible for her date (Jay Z, presumably) not showing. But it is, by my count, only the second time in her solo career that Beyoncé has ever admitted that just maybe it's she who's in the wrong." He went on to say that by moving away from the big and "sweeping" statements present in some of her older material, towards personal narration, Beyoncé managed to effectively examine the themes and statements she explored throughout her career. Feeney concluded by stating: "It's not a breakup anthem, nor is it a declaration of undying love. It's angry, it's introspective, it's regretful, it's playful, it's loving, and it's everything in between."

== Music video ==
=== Background and release ===
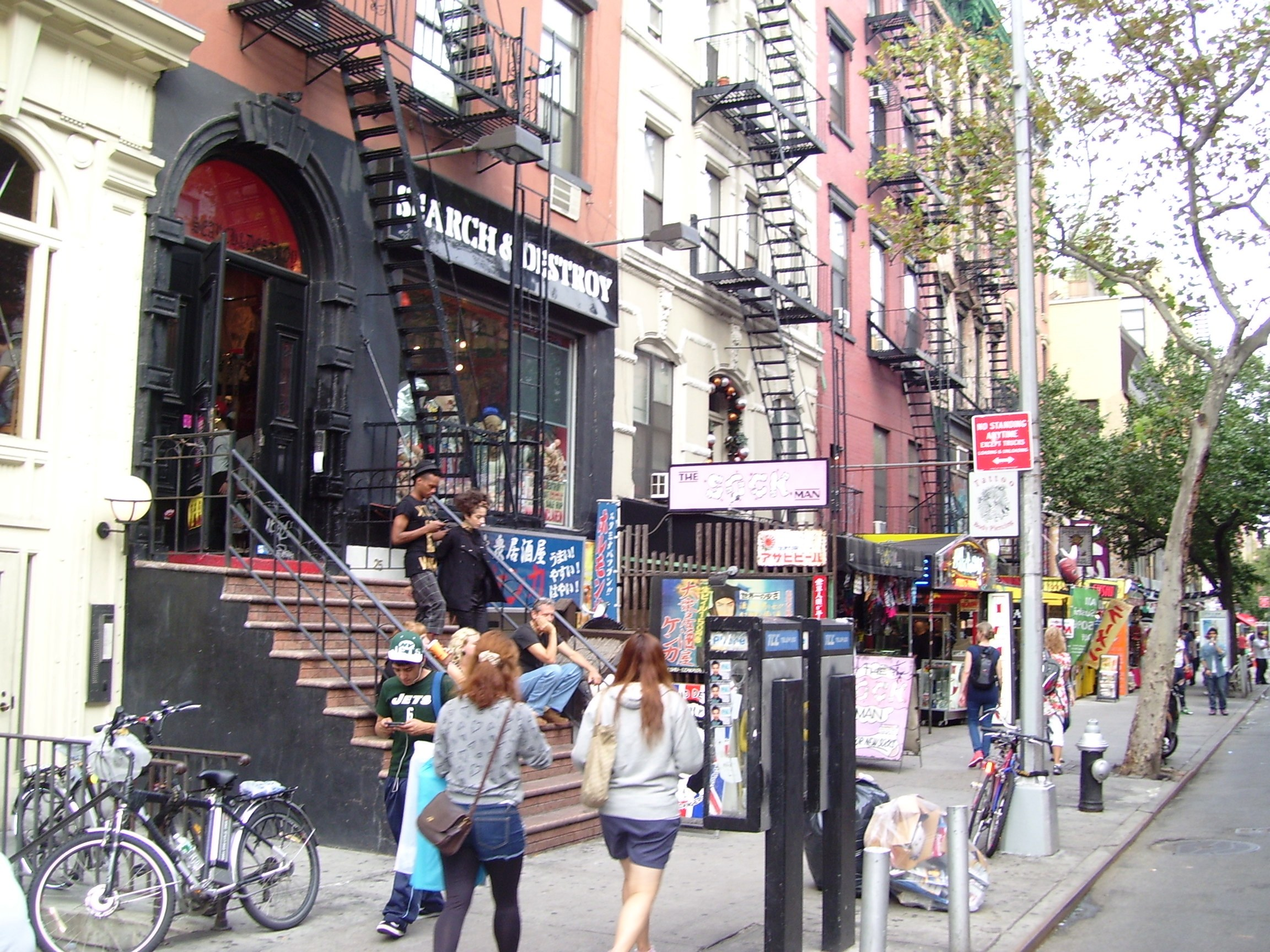
St. Mark's Place (pictured) served as one of the locations where the clip for "Jealous" was filmed.

A music video for "Jealous" was released on December 13, 2013, to iTunes Store on Beyoncé itself along with sixteen other music videos for every track on the album. Beyoncé served as a director for the video along with Francesco Carrozzini and Todd Tourso, the latter also serving as a creative director for the entire project. On November 24, 2014, the clip was also uploaded to the singer's Vevo account. It was shot in New York City, three weeks prior to its release, in November 2013. An image of Beyoncé while filming the video surfaced online the same month, showing her wearing a red leather trench coat with a matching lipstick and silver stiletto heels. Cinya Burton from E! praised her look as a "sexy getup". Beyoncé's team contacted Carozzini several days prior to the commencing of the shooting for the visual. Carozzini revealed that collaborating with the singer on the video was different than his previous efforts as the precise storyline of the clip was conceived and written by herself containing many references. When shooting the scenes on St. Marks, Beyoncé only got out of a car and her crew immediately started filming. Carozzini told MTV News:

"We really shot it — some people in the video did not know we were filming. I think the real idea of the video is in a moment like that — in a private moment like that, she can never be by herself... This song is not about someone who feels those emotions, it's about Beyoncé feeling those emotions. It's personal to her. It's her that cannot be by herself no matter where she goes or what she does, because she's who she is."

=== Synopsis ===
The video of "Jealous" was considered to be a sequel to the one for the previous clip on the album, "Partition". It opens with Beyoncé watching a man while he is sitting on a table in front of her, reading a newspaper. She stands up and the scene transitions to the singer walking down the stairs in a mansion, wearing a gown. It continues with Beyoncé, sitting alone at an arranged table for dinner, waiting for her love interest to come home. As she waits for him, at one point she angrily sweeps the crystal, dinnerware and candles from the table with her hands as he does not show up. Afterwards, she dresses in a red leather trench coat with a gold choker and goes outside to look for her man. She is seen on a street surrounded by various fans taking pictures of her. The scenes also transition to the singer being at a party in a bar, chatting with people, holding a drink in her hands and straddling a pinball machine. As the song nears its end, sped-up scenes of a car driving on different streets follows. During the end, Beyoncé runs to a man who is seen only from the back, dressed in a hooded coat. She embraces him with teary eyes, sighing with relief. Throughout the video, close-up shots of the singer are also featured, showing her expressions. Beyoncé is seen wearing a high-waist corset and a cropped lace top designed by Ulyana Sergeenko with her look being complete with an earring. She also wears a studded plate cuff, a chain, and a gold bracelet from jewelry by Eddie Borgo. During scenes at the party, she wears a sweatshirt designed by Givenchy.

=== Reception and analysis ===
A writer of The New York Times described the singer's look in the video as "bold". Lauren Cochrane from The Guardian also focused on the singer's look praising the attire she wore as "perfectly acceptable as dinner party" and praising her for wearing the corset with aplomb. An editor of Billboard felt that she "gets sexy" in the song's visual. A writer of the website Fuse praised the concept of the video, noting that "instead of crying into the steak she just made for her date, she puts on a leather trench coat and hits the town. Ultimately, she wins." Dan DeLuca of the Philadelphia Media Network noted that the video gave an opportunity to the singer to showcase her "dark side". Writing on behalf of Vanity Fair, Michelle Collins felt that the set was "bizzaro", similar to a set as in the film Sliding Doors (1998). She further found several of the scenes to accompany the song's lyrics and story. Melissa Locker from Time magazine wrote in her review that the video follows the steps of "Partition" while also being a "natural precursor to 'Irreplaceable,' at least in our imagination". Michael Zelenko from The Fader wrote that it served as a follow-up to "Partition" noting that in "Jealous", "Bey's lingering needs are transformed into a burning suspicion of infidelity".

Whitney Phaneuf from the website HitFix described the scene where the singer is seen sweeping the table as "one of her best diva moments". She also interpreted her character as a "scorned" woman and neglected wife. Similar sentiments were offered by Brenna Ehrlich of MTV News who felt that the man's role in the video was a neglectful and possibly cheating lover. Ehrlich went on to describe the mansion seen in the beginning of the video as Versailles-esque and felt that the singer unveiled her new alter ego, Yoncé, while seen at the party in a bar, flirting with other people. She concluded that despite the "emotional turmoil" featured throughout, the video ended on a hopeful note. John Walker, writing for the same publication, noted the singer managed to show real madness and jealousy, while "smashing up her home out of insecurity". A more mixed review came from Brent DiCrescenzo of the magazine Time Out who wrote in his review, "Walking down the street in a leather jacket. A car racing down roads at night. That's about it."

== Live performance and other version ==
During the 2014 MTV Video Music Awards, Beyoncé performed "Jealous" live during a medley consisting of songs from her self-titled album. She performed the song dressed in a bodysuit and was backed by a clip. In a review of the performance, Nadeska Alexis felt that the singer managed to emphasize "the weight of... [the] lyrics" while performing the song. Writing for Fuse, Hilary Hughes concluded that the rendition of the song was "enough to halt all conversation, silence all phones and pause the internet for a moment, as she got real right off the bat".

A remix of the song was released on April 2, 2015, featuring additional vocals from singer Chris Brown. According to Brown, it was originally recorded for "the Beyoncé collaboration album but it was never used".

== Credits and personnel ==
Credits are adapted from the singer's official website and the album's liner notes.

Song credits

- Writing — Noel "Detail" Fisher, Beyoncé Knowles, Lyrica Anderson, Andre Eric Proctor, Rasool Diaz, Brian Soko and Boots
- Production — Fisher and Knowles
- Additional production — Boots, Hit-Boy, Hazebanga and Proctor
- Vocals production — Knowles
- Recording — Stuart White; Jungle City Studios and Oven Studios, New York City
- Second engineering — Ramon Rivas and Rob Suchecki, assisted by Carlos Perezdeanda
- Backing vocals — Boots
- Instruments — Boots
- Audio mixing —Tony Maserati; Mirrorball Studios, North Hollywood, California
- Mix engineering — Stuart White, James Krausse and Justin Hergett
- Mix consulting — Derek Dixie
- Mastering — Tom Coyne and Aya Merrill; Sterling Sound, New York City

Video credits

- Directors — Knowles, Francesco Carrozzini, Todd Tourso
- Director of photography — Jackson Hunt
- Additional photography — Douglas E. Porter
- Executive producers —Erinn Williams, Jonathan Lia, Brian Welsh
- Producer — Brian Welsh
- Production company —Good Company, Parkwood Entertainment
- Stylist — Lysa Cooper
- Additional styling — Ty Hunter, Raquel Smith, B. Åkerlund, Tim White
- Production designer — Anthony Asaro
- Editor — Alexander Hammer
- Brand manager — Melissa Vargas
- Hair — Neal Farinah
- Make-up — Sir John
- Color correction — Ron Sudul for Nice Shoes
- Visual effects — Charlex
- Additional visual effects — The Artery
- Photography — Aviva Klein

== Certifications ==
Region	Certification	Certified units/sales
United States (RIAA)	Gold	500,000^{‡}
^{‡} Sales+streaming figures based on certification alone.
