= Dedication 4 =

Mixtape by Lil Wayne
- Released: September 3, 2012
- Genre: Hip-hop
- Length: 52:00
- Labels: Young Money, Aphilliates Music Group
- Producers: DJ Drama; The Beat Bully; Brian Soko; Chase Davis; Detail; DJ Khaled; DJ Spinz; Dre Proctor; EZ Elpee; Hit-Boy; Jahlil Beats; Kanye West; K.E. on the Track; Key Wane; Lifted; Mike Will Made It; Outkast; Rasool Diaz; Sarom; Sonny Digital; Streetrunner; Young Chop
- Compiler: DJ Drama

Lil Wayne chronology
Tha Carter IV (2011)	Dedication 4 (2012)	I Am Not a Human Being II (2013)

Dedication 4 is the eleventh mixtape by American rapper Lil Wayne. The mixtape, hosted by DJ Drama, was originally supposed to be released on August 15, 2012, but got delayed several times and was released on September 3, 2012. It is the fourth installment of Lil Wayne's Dedication series, following its predecessors The Dedication, Dedication 2 and Dedication 3. It's also the fourth installment of Lil Wayne's "Gangsta Grillz" series.

== Background ==
On July 15, 2012, Wayne announced that the mixtape will be released some time in August, 2012 stating "Dedikation 4 coming next month." DJ Drama revealed to MTV that Cortez Bryant told him that Wayne "had been mentioning it and was gearing up", and during a stop of Drake's Club Paradise Tour Bryant told him "it was a 100% go".

On August 1, 2012, Lil Wayne confirmed the release date of the mixtape when he called into DJ Drama's Hot 107.9 radio show. Wayne then also named three instrumentals ("Cashin Out", "I Don't Like" and "Burn") that he had already rapped over. On August 15, 2012, Mack Maine wrote that the release date of the mixtape got pushed back to a then unknown date. Maine also said that Lil Wayne would announce the new release date, and "something special" (which later turned out to be the track "No Lie") by stating "Announcement and something special will be delivered by @LilTunechi today....#stayTUNEd".

Lil Wayne later explained he didn't release Dedication 4 on August 15, because his friend and fellow rapper 2 Chainz released his debut album Based on a T.R.U. Story on August 14, and he wanted all the attention on 2 Chainz. The official artwork was released through Wayne's Facebook page on August 16, 2012. On August 17, 2012, Nicki Minaj confirmed that she features on the mixtape.

On August 24, 2012, Lil Wayne announced the mixtape would be released on August 30, 2012 by stating "D4 aug-30", however on August 30 it was confirmed by DJ Drama that the mixtape would be pushed back to September 3, 2012. The mixtape got pushed back again because Cortez Bryant wanted DJ Drama to properly set it up. On September 3, 2012, the mixtape was released for free download on multiple mixtape websites at 12:00PM EST which then got pushed back to 4:00PM EST and was finally release at 4:30PM EST.

== Critical reception ==
Professional ratings
Aggregate scores
Source	Rating
Metacritic	(60/100)
Review scores
Source	Rating
BET.com	3/5 stars
Billboard	(58/100)
Consequence of Sound	3/5 stars
Exclaim!	(mixed)
HipHopDX	(mixed)
Pitchfork	(5/10)
RapReviews	(4.5/10)
Rolling Stone	3.5/5 stars
The Washington Post	(average)
XXL	3/5 stars

Upon its release, Dedication 4 was met with mixed reviews from music critics. At Metacritic, which assigns a normalized rating out of 100 to reviews from mainstream critics, the album received an average score of 60, which indicates "mixed or average reviews" based on 7 reviews. Kevin Jones of Exclaim! said, "Wayne's current stylistic tack of relying entirely on rap metaphors, along with a thematic scope limited almost exclusively to sex and periodic sprinkles of king-of-the-hill braggadocio, leaves listeners awash in an endless streams of exhausting wordplay, with relatively few moments of genuine, smirk-inducing entertainment." William Ketchum III of HipHopDX said, "Dedication 4 won’t have the iconic, game-changing longevity that the series’ first two did, but it's still a snack-sized offering that offers glimpses of the New Orleans youngster who proclaimed himself as the "Best Rapper Alive" Regardless, seeing Dedication in the title will likely inspire listeners to turn up previous classics like "Cannon," "Georgia…Bush" and "Motivation." Jody Rosen of Rolling Stone said, "This summer, Lil Wayne told a radio station that rap had become "boring," and that he prefers to spend time on his skateboard. Yet on much of this mixtape, he sounds less bored than he has in years, drawling filthy, funny rhymes over beats borrowed from Rick Ross, 2 Chainz and more." Jayson Greene of Pitchfork said, "The worst I can say about Dedication 4 is that there isn't one moment where I wouldn't rather be listening to the often mediocre originals. There are a dozen or so good punch lines scattered on D4, enough to make it fun enough for one listen "

Nicki Minaj's verse on "Mercy" got attention particularly for the line "I'm a Republican voting for Mitt Romney" Then President Barack Obama responded to the line saying "She likes to play different characters. So I don’t know what’s going on there.”

== Track listing ==
All tracks were arranged by DJ Drama.

No.	Title	Original Instrumental	Length
1.	"So Dedicated" (featuring Birdman)	"So Sophisticated" (Rick Ross featuring Meek Mill)	2:44
2.	"Same Damn Tune"	"Same Damn Time" (Future)	3:06
3.	"Cashed Out"	"Cashin' Out" (Cash Out)	3:57
4.	"No Worries" (featuring Detail)	N/A	3:30
5.	"Mercy" (featuring Nicki Minaj)	"Mercy" (Kanye West featuring Big Sean, Pusha T & 2 Chainz)	4:48
6.	"Burn"	"Burn" (Meek Mill featuring Big Sean)	3:38
7.	"Amen" (featuring Boo)	"Amen" (Meek Mill featuring Drake)	3:18
8.	"Get Smoked" (Remix) (Lil Mouse featuring Lil Wayne)	"Get Smoked" (Lil Mouse)	3:49
9.	"My Homies Still" (performed by Young Jeezy, Jae Millz, and Gudda Gudda)	"My Homies Still" (Lil Wayne featuring Big Sean)	2:57
10.	"Green Ranger" (featuring J. Cole)	"Special Delivery" (G. Dep featuring P. Diddy)	3:21
11.	"Don't Like"	"I Don't Like (GOOD Music Remix)" (Chief Keef, Kanye West, Pusha T, Big Sean, & Jadakiss)	2:35
12.	"No Lie"	"No Lie" (2 Chainz featuring Drake)	2:31
13.	"Magic" (featuring Flow)	"Magic" (Future featuring T.I.)	2:34
14.	"Wish You Would"	"Wish You Would" (DJ Khaled featuring Kanye West & Rick Ross)	3:02
15.	"A Dedication"	"SpottieOttieDopaliscious" (Outkast)	6:10
Total length:			52:00
