= I Am Not a Human Being II =

Studio album by Lil Wayne
- Released: March 26, 2013
- Recorded: 2006–2012
- Genre: Hip-hop
- Length: 65:32
- Labels: Young Money; Cash Money; Republic
- Producers: Bryan "Baby Birdman" Williams (exec.); Cortez Bryant (exec.); Dwayne Carter (exec.); Mack Maine (exec.); Ronald "Slim Tha Don" Williams (exec.); A+; Brian Soko; Christian Stalnecker; Cool & Dre; David Banner; Detail; Diplo; Dre Moon; DVLP; ELEW; Fabian Marascuillo; Filthy; Hudson Mohawke; Juicy J; Lunice; Mike Banger; Mike Will Made It; Nikhil Seetharam; Sarom; Soulja Boy; Streetrunner; T-Minus

Lil Wayne chronology
Dedication 4 (2012)	I Am Not a Human Being II (2013)	Dedication 5 (2013)

Singles from I Am Not a Human Being II
- 1. "No Worries" Released: September 3, 2012; 2. "Love Me" Released: January 18, 2013; 3. "Rich As Fuck" Released: April 9, 2013

I Am Not a Human Being II is the tenth studio album by American rapper Lil Wayne. It was released on March 26, 2013, by Young Money Entertainment, Cash Money Records and Republic Records. Recording sessions took place during 2006 to 2012, with Lil Wayne serving as the records executive producers, alongside Ronald "Slim" Williams and Birdman, who enlisted a wide variety of record producers such as Cool & Dre, Mike Will Made It, David Banner, T-Minus, Diplo, Juicy J and Street Runner, among others. The album serves as the sequel to I Am Not a Human Being (2010), incorporating the elements of these hip-hop styles. The album was supported by three singles: "No Worries" featuring Detail, "Love Me" featuring Drake and Future, and "Rich As Fuck" featuring 2 Chainz; the latter of which peaked at numbers 29, 9 and 38 respectively, on the US Billboard Hot 100. It was the last album Lil Wayne released under Cash Money Records.

I Am Not a Human Being II was included as one of the multiples on "Most Anticipated Albums of 2013" lists. However, upon its release, the album received generally mixed reviews from music critics, who criticized its production and panned Wayne's lyrics. The album debuted at number two on the US Billboard 200, selling 217,000 copies in its first week. In September 2020, the album was certified double platinum by the Recording Industry Association of America (RIAA).

== Background ==
In January 2012, Birdman confirmed that the production was underway for the sequel to Lil Wayne's eighth album, I Am Not a Human Being (2010), titled I Am Not a Human Being II. Wayne later announced to MTV that he completed the album, while putting even greater attention to the quality control than its predecessor, and he said that he had to "rush" it to the finish from the original project before serving his time in jail after his sentence for the illegal possession of a weapon. I Am Not a Human Being II contains some of the unused materials from the earlier recording sessions that took place for Tha Carter III and IV. It was first originally planned for the fall 2012 release, but it was delayed until stating the release for February 19, 2013, I Am Not a Human Being II was eventually announced to be released on March 26. In January 2013, the album was included as one of the multiples on "Most Anticipated Albums of 2013" lists, such as the one by MTV and was on the twelfth place on the XXL's list.

== Music and lyrics ==
Much in the vein of Lil Wayne's earlier works, I Am Not a Human Being II addresses themes of drugs and sex. The album incorporates much of his traditional hip-hop styles, also experiments with rock-influenced elements. Described as extremely vulgar by Complex, the album contains 182 uses of the word "nigga", 102 uses of "bitch", 63 references to having sex, 39 mentions of marijuana and 38 references to shooting people among other numerous references to pills, codeine, getting fellatio, giving cunnilingus, and skateboarding. The themes of sex, violence, and drugs are all allegories in the album according to Carter and the producers which claim that it is a story about American struggles of singlehood, poverty, violence, disease, and physical pain.

== Artwork ==
In November 2012, Lil Wayne announced that Kanye West would be designing everything from the cover art to the album packaging. According to Wayne, West approached him about doing it because he "wanted to package a Wayne album". On January 30, 2013, the West-designed cover was released, featuring a red moth spread across a black background. On February 1, 2013, Wayne explained the cover saying, "he chose the moth butterfly thing because it has so many different stages of life, and it goes through so many forms and changes, and no one can figure it out, and it's always beautiful". On the day of the album's release DONDA, released an animated version of the album cover. Overall, the artwork was designed and directed by Kanye West and Joe Perez of DONDA. In December 2013, Complex positioned it at number 27 on their list of the best album covers of 2013.

== Singles ==
"Hot Revolver" was released on March 17, 2009, released as the second single from his seventh studio album, Rebirth (2010). The song, produced by American production duo Cool & Dre, features uncredited guest vocals from Dre. The song was originally intended to be included on Rebirth, however for unspecified reasons it was left off the final track listing. An extended version of the song with an extra verse from Wayne later leaked online on March 26, 2009. A re-recorded version of the song was later included as a bonus track on Wayne's tenth studio album I Am Not a Human Being II (2013), featuring no Auto-Tune and a new verse from Wayne.

"My Homies Still" was released on June 5, 2012. The track features guest vocals from a fellow American rapper Big Sean, with the production that was provided by Streetrunner and Sarom. The song was included on the deluxe version of "I Am Not a Human Being II". The music video premiered on July 16, 2012. Following its release to digital retailers in the United States, the song debuted at number 38 on the US Billboard Hot 100.

The lead single from the album, "No Worries", was released on September 3, 2012. The track features guest vocals from a Detail, who also contributed the production to this song. The track was also included on Lil Wayne's mixtape Dedication 4. Cortez Bryant explained that the song has been added to Dedication 4, because the mixtape has been pushed back several times. On November 21, 2012, the music video debuted on MTV. The song peaked at number 29 on the US Billboard Hot 100.

On December 30, 2012, "Love Me" featuring Drake and Future premiered. Production was handled by Mike WiLL Made It. It was first leaked online. "Love Me" was released for digital download on January 18, 2013, as the album's lead single. The song sold 1,000,000 copies and was certified platinum by the RIAA (RIAA). The song became a top ten hit, peaking at number 9 on the US Billboard Hot 100, becoming Lil Wayne's eighteenth top ten single on the chart. Producer Mike WiLL Made It, reveals that this instrumental for the track "Love Me" was intended to be for one of DJ Khaled's newest songs, before Khaled decided to send it to Wayne instead.

On January 6, 2013, this track, called "Rich As Fuck" featuring 2 Chainz, was leaked as an unmastered version and was originally set to be the next single from the album, but instead chose "Love Me" to be released as a second single. "Rich As Fuck" was released as the first promotional single from the album along with the pre-order of the album via the iTunes Store. The official version of the song was remastered and the first and second verse were switched around, compared to the leaked version. The song was sent to urban radio in the US on April 9, 2013, as the third single from the album. The music video directed by Parris, was released on March 22, 2013. The song has since peaked at number 38 on the Billboard Hot 100.

== Tour ==
On December 18, 2012, Lil Wayne announced that he would going on a European tour with Mac Miller and 2 Chainz during March 2013, in promotion for I Am Not a Human Being II. On March 5, 2013, Wayne stated that the tour would be postponed until October 2013, in order to be prepare better and able to be fully promote the album. The tour will feature 15 performances in 10 different countries over the month. On March 21, Lil Wayne announced that he would be headlining the second America's Most Wanted Tour, along with a fellow rapper T.I. T.I. explained that the tour will begin on July 5 through September 1, 2013. French Montana and 2 Chainz were later confirmed to join the tour, with others that were announced. The first America's Most Wanted Tour took place five years prior, featuring Young Jeezy, Soulja Boy, Pleasure P, Jeremih and Young Money, among others.

== Critical reception ==
Professional ratings
Aggregate scores
Source	Rating
AnyDecentMusic?	4.5/10
Metacritic	51/100
Review scores
Source	Rating
AllMusic	3/5 stars
The A.V. Club	C
Entertainment Weekly	B−
The Guardian	2/5 stars
Los Angeles Times	2/4 stars
MSN Music (Expert Witness)	A−
NME	3/10
Pitchfork	3.9/10
Rolling Stone	3/5 stars
Spin	6/10

I Am Not a Human Being II received generally mixed reviews from music critics. At Metacritic, which assigns a normalized rating out of 100 to reviews from mainstream critics, the album received an average score of 51, based on 23 reviews. Jody Rosen, writing in Rolling Stone, felt that Wayne is "half-interested" and lacks the "exhilarating surprise" of his previous work. Mikael Wood of the Los Angeles Times wrote that the album shows Wayne "streamlining his eccentricities", while Pitchfork's Jayson Greene panned his lyrics as an "undifferentiated slurry of interchangeable" dick jokes, drug references, and unconvincing puns, "none of them funny or creative". Alex Macpherson of The Guardian found his metaphors "laboured, tired or just remarkably offputting." Evan Rytlewski of The A.V. Club accused Wayne of having "bad taste" and rapping solely about oral sex, "a subject that tends to invite misplaced aggression and puerile humor".

Jon Caramanica of The New York Times called the album "less manic, less experimental, less unpredictable and, oddly, less consistent" than "drug-era Lil Wayne". Al Horner of NME said that "the chilling growl and imaginative Auto-Tune of hits like 'Got Money' replaced by tired punchlines and lazy hooks." Spin's Brandon Soderberg felt that the album was a continuation of "Wayne's steady creative decline", adding that "you're better off soaking in the good choices here and resigning yourself to enduring the bad ones." Dean Van Nguyen of PopMatters found the beats "dispensable" and said that they "mirror his own boredom with the project." Ken Capobianco of The Boston Globe said that, apart from the "potent" "Gunwalk" and "No Worries", the album is "both numbingly haphazard and inconsequential."

In a positive review, David Jeffries of AllMusic said that the album is an "indulgent jumble of a sideline release, but that doesn't mean Wayne isn't in fine form", and observed "stunning talent, true wit, and a John Holmes level of cocksure" from him. USA Today's Steve Jones found it "solid" and "often entertaining in the crass, lewd and rude way that's uniquely Wayne." MSN Music's Robert Christgau called it "progress" that the songs "deploy the P-word" sexually rather than pejoratively and felt that it suggests that, "unlike most rappers and related pop lifeforms who brag about sex, Weezy really seems to savor it ... A loose-lipped ship-sinker is what he was meant to be."

== Commercial performance ==
I Am Not a Human Being II debuted at number two on the US Billboard 200, selling 217,000 copies in the first week. This became Wayne's tenth US top-ten debut. In its second week, the album dropped to number five on the chart, selling an additional 68,000 copies. In its third week, the album dropped to number eight on the chart, selling 42,000 more copies. In its fourth week, the album remained at number eight on the chart, selling 31,000 copies. As of July 30, 2013, the album has sold 529,000 copies in the US. On September 25, 2020, the album was certified double platinum by the Recording Industry Association of America (RIAA) for combined sales and album-equivalent units of over two million units in the United States.

== Track listing ==
No.	Title	Writer(s)	Producer(s)	Length
1.	"IANAHB"	Dwayne Carter Jr.; Sebastian Nadal	ELEW	5:38
2.	"Curtains" (featuring Boo)	Carter Jr.; Noel Fisher; Sabrian Sledge; Eric Proctor; Brian Soko; Rasool Ricardo Diaz; Jermaine Preyan; Brian Williams	Detail; Dre Moon^{[a]}; Soko^{[a]}; Diaz^{[a]}	4:31
3.	"Days and Days" (featuring 2 Chainz)	Carter Jr.; Tauheed Epps; Andre Lyon; Marcello Valenzano; Barbara Ozen; Preyan; Williams	Cool & Dre	3:13
4.	"Gunwalk" (featuring Gudda Gudda)	Carter Jr.; Carl Lilly Jr.; Jordan Houston; Michael Foster; Preyan; Williams	Juicy J; Crazy Mike	4:31
5.	"No Worries" (featuring Detail)	Carter Jr.; Fisher, Diaz; Preyan; Williams; Proctor; Soko; Brian Smith	Detail; Dre Moon^{[a]}; Soko^{[a]}; Diaz^{[a]}	3:41
6.	"Back to You"	Carter Jr.; Fabio Marascuillo; Christian Stalnecker; Jamie Lidell	Marascuillo; Stalnecker^{[a]}	5:29
7.	"Trigger Finger" (featuring Soulja Boy)	Carter Jr.; DeAndre Way; Houston; Foster; Preyan; Williams	Juicy J; Crazy Mike	4:32
8.	"Beat the Shit" (featuring Gunplay)	Carter Jr.; Bigram Zayas; Matthew DelGiorno; Richard Morales	DVLP; Filthy^{[a]}	4:28
9.	"Rich As Fuck" (featuring 2 Chainz)	Carter Jr.; Epps; Tyler Williams; Nikhil Seetharam	T-Minus; Seetharam^{[a]}	3:43
10.	"Trippy" (featuring Juicy J)	Carter Jr.; Houston; Foster; Preyan; Williams	Juicy J; Crazy Mike	4:23
11.	"Love Me" (featuring Drake and Future)	Carter Jr.; Nayvadius Wilburn; Aubrey Graham; Michael Williams II; Asheton Hogan	Mike Will Made It; A+^{[a]}	4:13
12.	"Romance"	Carter Jr.; Fisher; Preyan; Williams	Detail	4:20
13.	"God Bless Amerika"	Carter Jr.; Lyon; Valenzano; Preyan; Williams	Cool & Dre	5:03
14.	"Wowzerz" (featuring Trina)	Carter Jr.; Way; Katrina Taylor	Soulja Boy	3:45
15.	"Hello" (featuring Shane Heyl)	Carter Jr.; Michael Cadahia; Shane Heyl	Mike Banger	4:02

Deluxe edition (bonus tracks)
No.	Title	Writer(s)	Producer(s)	Length
16.	"Lay It Down" (featuring Nicki Minaj and Cory Gunz)	Carter Jr.; Onika Maraj; Peter Pankey Jr.; Ross Birchard; Lunice Pierre II	Hudson Mohawke; Lunice; Diplo^{[a]}	4:05
17.	"Hot Revolver" (featuring Dre)	Carter Jr.; Lyon; Valenzano; Billie Joe Armstrong; Frank Wright III; Michael Pritchard	Cool & Dre	3:20
18.	"My Homies Still" (featuring Big Sean)	Carter Jr.; Sean Anderson; Nicholas Warwar; Raymond Diaz; Mike Aiello	Streetrunner; Sarom	4:06
Total length:				1:17:11

Target bonus track
No.	Title	Writer(s)	Producer(s)	Length
19.	"Shit Stains"	Carter Jr.; Lavell Crump	David Banner	4:17
Total length:				1:21:29

Notes

- ^{^[a]} signifies a co-producer.
- "Romance" is not included on the digital version or the Japanese version of the album.
- "Gunwalk" features uncredited vocals by Juicy J.

Samples credits

- "Days and Days" contains samples from Barbara Lynn's "Good Women."
- "Back to You" contains samples from Jamie Lidell's "Compass."
- "Hot Revolver" contains samples from Green Day's "Basket Case."
- "Trigger Finger" contains samples from Jesper Kyd's "Leonardo's Inventions, Part 1." from The Ubisoft Video Game Assassin's Creed II.
- "Lay It Down" heavily samples TNGHT's song "Easy Easy."

== Credits and personnel ==
Credits for I Am Not a Human Being II adapted from AllMusic.

- 2 Chainz - Featured Artist
- Lance "Fuze the Mc" Coleman - Digital Strategist
- A+ - Producer
- Danny Arrondo - Assistant Engineer
- Chris Athens - Mastering
- Joshua Berkman - A&R
- Sam Bohl - Mixing Assistant
- Boo - Featured Artist
- Brian Smith - Songwriter
- Brian Soko - Producer
- Cortez Bryant - Executive Producer
- Sean Buchanan - Assistant Engineer
- David Cabrera - Guitar
- Dre Moon - Producer
- Michael "Banger" Cadahia - Engineer, Producer
- Noel Cadastre - Assistant Engineer
- Dwayne Carter - Executive Producer
- Cool & Dre - Producer
- Crazy Mike - Producer
- Detail - Featured Artist, Producer
- Rascool Ricardo Diaz - Producer
- Alex Dilliplane - Mixing Assistant
- Drake - Featured Artist
- DVLP - Producer
- ELEW - Producer
- Colin Fichman - Assistant Engineer
- Filthy - Producer
- Future - Featured Artist
- Gudda Gudda - Featured Artist
- Gunplay - Featured Artist
- Shane Heyl - Featured Artist
- Patrick Joint - Assistant Engineer
- Juicy J - Featured Artist, Producer
- Lil Wayne - Primary Artist
- Mack Maine - Executive Producer
- Fabian Marascuillo - Mixing, Producer
- Stephen McDowell - Mixing Assistant
- Mike Will Made It - Producer
- Joe Perez - Art Direction, Graphic Design
- Andy Rodriquez - Assistant Engineer
- Fareed Salamah - Engineer
- Nikhil Seetharam - Producer
- Noah "40" Shebib - Engineer
- Soulja Boy - Featured Artist, Producer
- Christian "Davis" Stalnecker - Producer
- T-Minus - Producer
- Trina - Featured Artist
- Bryan "Baby Birdman" Williams - Executive Producer
- Ronald "Slim Tha Don" Williams - Executive Producer

== Charts ==
=== Weekly charts ===
Chart (2013)	Peak position
Australian Albums (ARIA)	43
Belgian Albums (Ultratop Flanders)	48
Belgian Albums (Ultratop Wallonia)	42
Canadian Albums Chart	5
Dutch Albums (Album Top 100)	52
French Albums (SNEP)	24
Japanese Albums Chart	5
Swiss Albums (Schweizer Hitparade)	35
UK Albums Chart	29
UK R&B Chart	2
US Billboard 200	2
US Top R&B/Hip-Hop Albums (Billboard)	2

=== Year-end charts ===
Chart (2013)	Position
US Billboard 200	38
US Top R&B/Hip-Hop Albums (Billboard)	10
US Top Rap Albums (Billboard)	7

Chart (2014)	Position
US Top R&B/Hip-Hop Albums (Billboard)	91

== Certifications ==
Region	Certification	Certified units/sales
Canada (Music Canada)	Gold	40,000^{^}
United States (RIAA)	2× Platinum	2,000,000^{‡}
^{^} Shipments figures based on certification alone.^{‡} Sales+streaming figures based on certification alone.

== Release history ==
Region	Date	Label
Australia	March 22, 2013	Republic Records
Germany	March 25, 2013	Republic Records
Ireland	March 25, 2013	Republic Records
United Kingdom	March 25, 2013	Island Records
Canada	March 26, 2013	Republic Records
United States	March 26, 2013	Young Money Entertainment, Cash Money Records, Republic Records
