= Drunk in Love =

2013 single by Beyoncé featuring Jay-Z

Single by Beyoncé featuring Jay-Z

from the album Beyoncé
- A-side: "XO" (double A-side)
- Released: December 16, 2013
- Recorded: 2012–2013
- Studio: Jungle City (New York City); Oven (New York City)
- Genre: Hip-hop; trap; R&B
- Length: 5:23
- Label: Parkwood; Columbia
- Songwriters: Noel Fisher; Shawn Carter; Andre Eric Proctor; Rasool Diaz; Brian Soko; Timothy Mosley; Jerome Harmon; Beyoncé Giselle Knowles-Carter
- Producers: Detail; Beyoncé Knowles

Beyoncé singles chronology
"Blow" (2013)	"XO" / "Drunk in Love" (2013)	"Part II (On the Run)" (2014)

Jay-Z singles chronology
"Know Bout Me" (2013)	"Drunk in Love" (2013)	"The Devil Is a Lie" (2013)

Music video
- Drunk in Love on YouTube

"Drunk in Love" is a song by American singer Beyoncé featuring American rapper Jay-Z. The duo wrote the song with the help of its producers Detail, Andre Eric Proctor, Rasool Diaz, Brian Soko, Timbaland, J-Roc and Boots. The song was released as a single from Beyoncé's fifth studio album, Beyoncé, on December 16, 2013. The song features prominent influences of trap music. Its lyrics, which depict female sexuality, are performed in a confident, salacious manner.

Many music critics called the song a follow up to Beyoncé's and Jay-Z's song "Crazy in Love" (2003). "Drunk in Love" peaked at number two on the US Billboard Hot 100 chart, spending eight weeks in the top ten. It peaked atop the airplay chart of South Africa and reached the top ten in France, Ireland, Lebanon, New Zealand, Portugal and the United Kingdom. At the 57th Annual Grammy Awards, "Drunk in Love" won Best R&B Song and Best R&B Performance.

The song's music video was directed by Hype Williams and shot in black-and-white in Golden Beach, Florida at a beach front manse. The visual features scenes of the pair singing the song together. "Drunk in Love" was performed by Beyoncé and Jay-Z at the 56th Grammy Awards. It was later added to the set lists of the second European leg of Beyoncé's The Mrs. Carter Show World Tour in 2013 and the pair's joint On the Run Tour in 2014. Numerous remixes and cover versions of the song were made, including an official remix with American rapper and collaborator of both artists, Kanye West. The music video won the Best Collaboration and was nominated for the Video of the Year at the 2014 MTV Video Music Awards.

== Conception and release ==
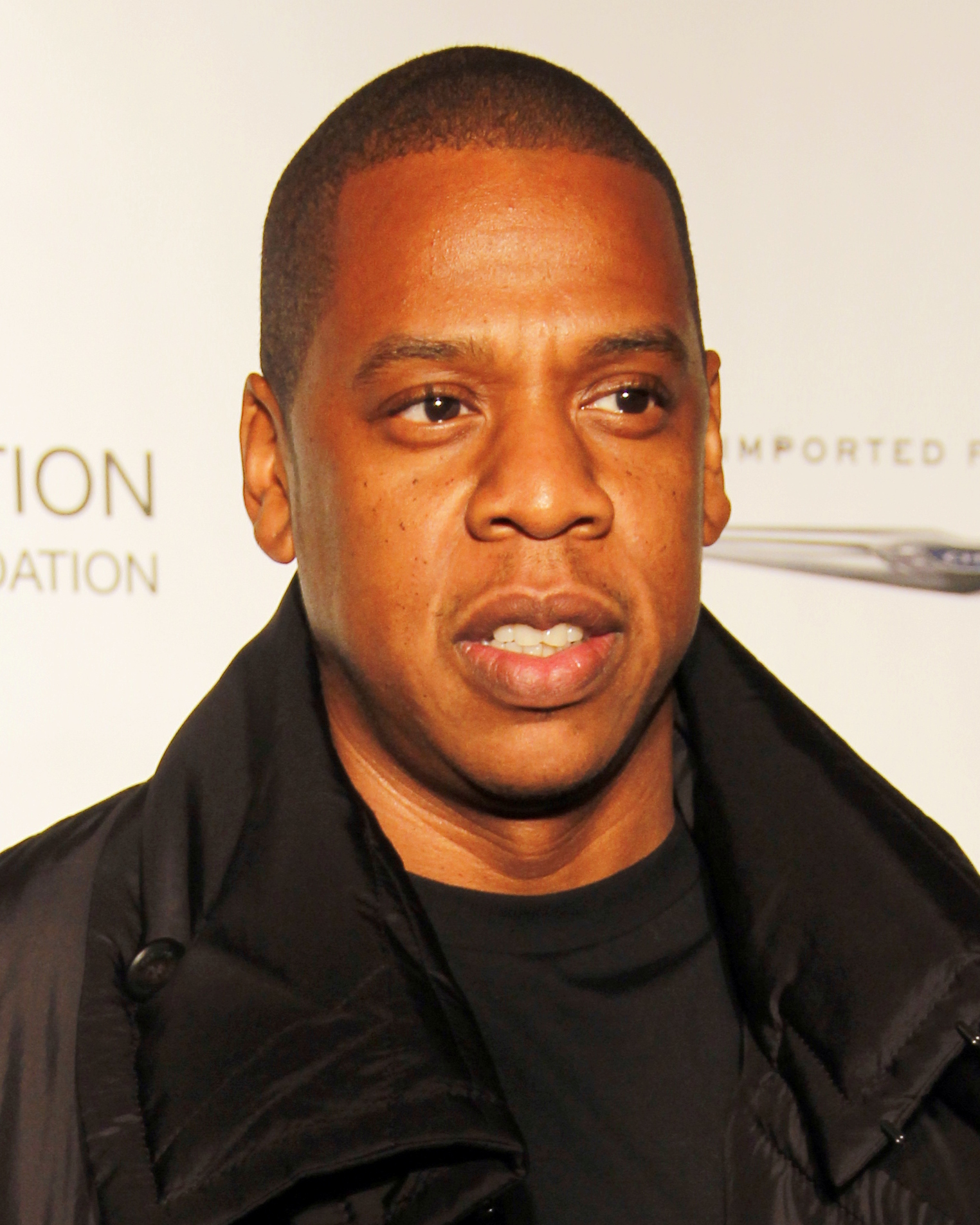
Jay-Z is credited as a co-writer and featured artist.

"Drunk in Love" was written by Beyoncé, Detail and Jay-Z at the end of 2012. Jay-Z also appears as the featured artist on the track. Production of the song was handled by Boots and Beyoncé as well as Detail. "Drunk in Love" was recorded at Jungle City Studios and at Oven Studios in New York City. Detail approached Beyoncé with a beat he had created called "Drunk" inspired by different situations from being affected by alcohol. Beyoncé further helped in the production of the song, adding elements that Detail had missed. She and Jay-Z later free-styled their verses for the song and Timbaland contributed keyboards. J-Roc, Dre Moon, Brian Soko and Rasool Ricardo Diaz contributed to the production of the song. Elaborating on the conception of the song, Beyoncé said: "We just kinda had a party. It was so great because it wasn't about any ego... we weren't trying to make a hit record, we were just having fun, and I think you can hear that in the record."

In 2014, rapper Future claimed that he had previously recorded a demo version of the song. He worked together with Detail who persuaded him to record vocals for the track as it would convince Beyoncé more easily to record it. Several days later, Detail informed Future that Beyoncé was in the studio recording "Drunk in Love". However, when the rapper was working on his second studio album Honest, he used the same melody of the demo version on a song called "Good Morning" as Beyoncé still hadn't released her version seven months after he was told that she worked on it. When Beyoncé released her album, the track was scrapped from the track listing of Honest.

"Drunk in Love" was subsequently included on Beyoncé's self-titled fifth studio album Beyoncé (2013) which was released on iTunes Store with no promotion having taken place beforehand. Following the album's release, Billboard reported that "Drunk in Love" would be sent to urban contemporary radio in the US exclusively. "XO" impacted CHR, hot adult contemporary and rhythmic contemporary radio in the US on December 16, 2013, as the first single from the album. "Drunk in Love" impacted urban contemporary radio stations on December 17, 2013, serving as one of the two lead singles from Beyoncé. On March 24, 2014, "Drunk in Love" was added to British radio station BBC Radio 1's C-List. A digital single, with "XO" as a double A-side, was released to streaming services such as Spotify, where the full Beyoncé album was not yet available to stream.

== Composition ==
'Drunk in Love'
A trap and R&B song, "Drunk in Love" features a heavy bass and explicit lyrics about love-making. Beyoncé uses a low vocal reminiscing a growl further adopting "eccentrical... wild" timbral shifts.

Musically, the song consists of bass, skittering drums, vague synthesizers, scintillating strings, finger snaps and a substantial amount of trap beats. Elements of hip hop music are also present in "Drunk in Love". Written in the key of A♭ major, the track contains a moderately slow tempo of 70 beats per minute, while also following a chord progression of Fm—B♭m—E♭—A♭. Beyoncé and Jay-Z's vocals range from D_{3} to E♭_{5}. Many contemporary critics viewed "Drunk in Love" as a sequel or an extension to Beyoncé's own 2003 collaboration with Jay-Z, "Crazy in Love". Jody Rosen from Vulture found trademark Timbaland synths in the song and further went on to describe its production as "skittering, blaring".

Keeping in with the most prominent theme of Beyoncé, "Drunk in Love" explores female sexuality. Its lyrics express "unbridled lust" and love-making with a wholly committed lover. As she sings about how much she likes sex with her partner, Beyoncé uses several double entendres, including the line, "grainin' on that wood", where she is supposedly referencing a surfboard. The singer displays much attitude through her vocal inflections that were described as "sassy" by critics. Her vocal performance in the song was described as conversational, half-sung half-rapped, "talk-over-the-beat" styled further conveying spontaneity and truth-telling. Her singing is further ornamented by Arabic-scale vocal arpeggios. Beyoncé's vocal performance in the song has been noted for containing a flow similar to rappers Drake and 2 Chainz. The Verge's Trent Wolbe felt that the song featured Animal Collective-esque vocal filtering.

On the bridge, Beyoncé sings about having drunken sex in the kitchen: "We woke up in the kitchen saying / How the hell did this shit happen / Oh baby, drunk in love, we be all night / Last thing I remember is our beautiful bodies grinding off in that club". The second verse of the song is half-rapped by her. Jay-Z later appears to provide his rapped verse as he relates having aggressive sex to Mike Tyson who was convicted of rape in 1992. Tyson also bit off a piece of Evander Holyfield's ear during a boxing match in 1997 which Jay-Z references: "Catch a charge I might / beat the box up like Mike / In '97 I bite." He then compares his relationship with Beyoncé to that of Ike Turner and Tina Turner. He forgoes subtlety as he raps, "Foreplay in a foyer, fucked up my Warhol/ Slid the panties right to the side/ Ain't got the time to take drawers off on sight... your breasteses is my breakfast". Similarly to Beyoncé, Jay-Z sings about the places they have had sex in their house. During his lines, he raps about "reppin' that Third", a reference to the Third Ward area located in Houston.

In 2014, Hungarian Romani folk singer Mitsou alleged Beyoncé, Jay Z and Timbaland had used samples of her singing "Bajba, bajba pelem" without compensating her. Mitsou was seeking unspecified damages and an end to distribution of the song. The lawsuit was dismissed in 2015, in a ruling that said that the song was a "constitutionally protected work of art" and the New York Civil Rights Law did not apply to it.

== Critical reception ==
The song garnered universal acclaim. Mikael Wood of the Los Angeles Times wrote that Beyoncé "trades terrifically raunchy come-ons with Jay Z [on 'Drunk in Love']; it's like an NC-17 sequel to their 2003 smash 'Crazy in Love'". Rob Sheffield of Rolling Stone chose the "sex song" as the album's best one, commenting that it is a "superb duet". Jon Dolan from the same publication also chose it as the album's best further comparing it with "Crazy in Love" with "100 percent more drunkenness". Andrew Hampp of Billboard called the track a "potential smash" as he praised its appeal to R&B radio stations and its "infectious, wailing of 'loooove' on the chorus". He also commended Beyoncé's and Jay-Z's rapped verses. Andrew Barker from Variety wrote in his review of Beyoncé, "a radio-ready pop single [is] buried somewhere within the Jay Z feature 'Drunk In Love,' yet Beyonce and Boots embellish it with enough strange grace notes and recitatives to create a much stranger monster than one might expect". Joey Guerra from the Houston Chronicle stated that Beyoncé was in "a fluid swagger" in "Drunk in Love".

Jody Rosen writing for Vulture described the song as an "appealing" record and one of the best collaborations between the duo throughout their careers. He concluded that "Jay's rap is goofy but not embarrassing." Nick Catucci of Entertainment Weekly termed Beyoncé's rap as "truculent" and noted that "Drunk in Love" is one of the few songs of the album that displays scale-busting. Kitty Empire of The Observer wrote that "Drunk in Love" finds Beyoncé "rapping lasciviously and making eyes at her husband. It's about 100 times better than that description allows for." Julia Leconte from Now praised the singer's "perfect" growling vocals. Chris Kelly of FACT magazine dubbed the song as the "requisite duet with Jay Z (whose Ike Turner-referencing verse caps off a year of cringeworthy efforts)". Pitchfork Media's Carrie Battan felt that the lines in which Beyoncé ad-libbed "surfboard" were "some of the most infectious snippets of pop music in 2013", elaborating "the single word serving as both shorthand for woman-on-top and a neat summation of an entire era of trends in rap cadence". Greg Kot of the Chicago Tribune described the track as a "frisky reverie". Likewise, Evan Rytlewski of The A.V. Club wrote:

The D'Angelo-indebted grind session 'Rocket' and frisky 'Drunk In Love' are similarly sexy, but they're not sexy like a glamour shot or a steamy video. They're sexy like an overeager, pre-shower quickie, or a hushed morning make-out session before the baby wakes up. These are the most unapologetically raunchy songs she's ever sung, and in many ways also the most romantic.

Philip Matusavage of musicOMH noted that though "Drunk in Love" does not have a chorus, it absolutely manages to be "thrilling", further writing that it is "packed with ideas and touches" which listeners would understand after repeated listens. Anupa Mistry of Spin considered the song to be one of Beyoncé's "elbows-up boom-trap anthems... ready to soundtrack both dive-bar antics and bottle-service quasi-sophistication." Philip Cosores of Paste highlighted that the track was highly evocative but found its lyrics to be "half-baked at best". Ryan Dennehy of AbsolutePunk wrote that "unconditional love has to be reciprocated to explain Jay Z's odious verse on 'Drunk in Love'". Stereogum's Tom Breihan criticized Jay-Z's "pretty bad" verse in the song. Philadelphia Media Network writer Dan DeLuca panned "Drunk in Love" as Beyoncé's biggest "misstep" due to Jay-Z's contribution.

Although being praised by media outlets, "Drunk in Love" sparked controversy for its lyrics referencing domestic violence. On the song, Jay-Z rapped the lyrics "I'm Ike, Turner, turn up / Baby no I don't play / Now eat the cake, Anna Mae / I said eat the cake, Anna Mae" which alludes to Tina Turner's abusive relationship with her former husband, Ike Turner. The lyric specifically refers to a scene from Tina Turner's biopic What's Love Got to Do with It (1993) in which Ike forced Tina to eat cake by pushing a piece of cake in her face. That particular scene was fabricated, but the film is loosely based on Tina Turner's real-life experience with a volatile husband. Rolling Stone's Rob Sheffield described the reference as "tasteless" in his review of the song and The Guardian writer Tshepo Mokoena called the song's lyrics "disturbing" and "distasteful". British radio station Bang Radio aired an edited version of the song excluding the lyrics.

=== Recognition and awards ===
In the annual Pazz and Jop mass critics poll of the year's best in music in 2013, "Drunk in Love" was ranked at number 162. The following year, "Drunk in Love" was ranked at number 21 on the same critics' poll. In 2014, the writers of Pitchfork placed the song at number 44 on their list of the 200 best songs of the decade so far, with editor Carrie Battan writing, "Someday, it will be heard as a brilliant ruse, a masterpiece of pop theater, or as simply a masterpiece, period." Rolling Stone ranked "Drunk in Love" at number one on its year-end list of the best songs in 2014. The magazine's writers described it as a "future-pop fantasy" and "the sexiest thing on the radio", further praising the singers for making "marriage sound ridiculously hot". By the end of 2019, the same magazine would list Drunk in Love as the 22nd best song of the 2010s, while NME would place it at number 59 on their decade-end countdown.

The song was nominated for Top R&B Song at the 2014 Billboard Music Awards. At the 2014 BET Awards, it won Best Collaboration and was nominated for Viewer's Choice, losing to "I Luv This Shit" by August Alsina and Trinidad James. At the 2014 Soul Train Music Awards, "Drunk in Love" was nominated in the category for Song of the Year. The track won two Grammy awards, in the categories for Best R&B Performance and Best R&B Song at the 57th Annual Grammy Awards in 2015.

== Commercial performance ==
In the US, "Drunk in Love" debuted at number 48 on the Hot R&B/Hip-Hop Airplay chart dated December 28, 2013. It was also the greatest gainer, with a 3.4 million audience impressions across 46 reporters. For the week ending January 4, 2014, the song soared to number nine on the airplay chart and went on to debut at number two on the Hot R&B/Hip-Hop Songs chart, the singer's highest debut on that chart with 61,000 downloads and 23.3 million audience impressions. Being attributed the greatest airplay gainer for the third consecutive week, the single moved to number six on the Hot R&B/Hip-Hop Airplay chart. "Drunk in Love" topped the chart for the week ending February 1, 2014, becoming Beyoncé's sixth number-one song on the Hot R&B/Hip-Hop Airplay chart. It spent eight consecutive weeks atop the chart. "Drunk in Love" also became Beyoncé's seventh number-one on the Hot R&B/Hip-Hop Songs chart and eighth number-one on the Rhythmic Songs chart.

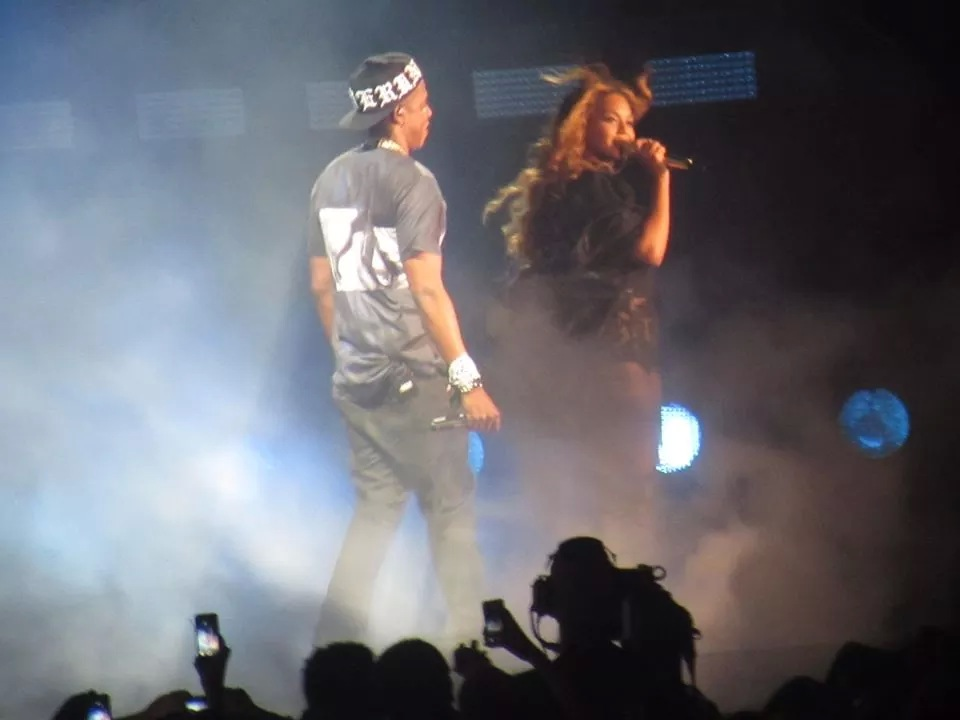
Beyoncé and Jay Z performing the song during the On the Run Tour (2014)

On the Billboard Hot 100, "Drunk in Love" debuted at number 12 for the week ending January 4, 2014 and equalled the performance of Beyoncé's 2006 single, "Ring the Alarm", for her highest debut position on the chart until 2016's "Formation". Following the couple's performance of the single at the 56th Annual Grammy Awards, it climbed to a new peak of number two (behind the Katy Perry single "Dark Horse"), becoming Beyoncé's first top 10 single since "Telephone" (2010) and her highest-charting song since "Single Ladies (Put a Ring on It)" (2008). "Drunk in Love" became her fifteenth top-ten Hot 100 single as a solo artist. The song spent eight consecutive weeks in the top ten and was certified platinum by the Recording Industry Association of America (RIAA) in April. In August 2022, "Drunk In Love" was certified six-times platinum by the RIAA denoting sales and streams of six million copies in the US, digital sales and streams included, making it Beyoncé's best selling single of the 2010s decade. On the Canadian Hot 100, the single peaked at number 22 and was certified quadruple-platinum by Music Canada for sales of 320,000 copies in the country.

Throughout February 2014, "Drunk in Love" peaked in the top-ten of several music charts, including France, where it is Beyoncé's longest charting song at 58 weeks. It peaked at number nine in Ireland and the United Kingdom, notching Beyoncé her seventeenth top 10 single on the UK Singles Chart as a solo artist. It become Beyoncé's sixteenth top-ten single in New Zealand, where it was certified gold for selling 7,500 digital copies that year. "Drunk in Love" was certified double platinum by the British Phonographic Industry (BPI) on January 14, 2022, for sales and streams of 1,200,000 units in the UK, making it Beyoncé's fifth best selling song in the region and her biggest seller of the decade. It received a triple platinum certification by the Australian Recording Industry Association (ARIA) in 2021 for sales of 210,000 copies. The single managed to top the airplay singles chart in South Africa from Entertainment Monitoring Africa on February 18, 2014.

== Music video ==
=== Background and synopsis ===
"[We were] much freer than anything I'd done in the past. We really just tried to trust our instincts, embrace the moment, and keep it fun... We were in Miami for Jay's concert, and it was just the two of us, on the beach, amazing weather, and one outfit! It's beautiful in its simplicity. If you want something to feel real and urgent, you can't overthink it."

— Beyoncé talking about the filming of the video for "Drunk in Love"

The video was filmed on August 15, 2013, in Golden Beach, Florida at a beach front manse that Beyoncé rented out for the shoot. It was directed by Hype Williams and shot in black-and-white; the clip depicts Beyoncé and Jay-Z "madly in love". The black-and-white shoot was meant to reference the work of fashion photographer Herb Ritts. Talking about the video in an iTunes Radio session, Beyoncé said, "The shoot was extremely effortless and spontaneous and we completely captured the energy of the song." She also went on to say that it was the most organic shoot she had ever done and further added: "I wanted to carry this idea of being in the moment and embracing mistakes and effortlessness into the video. I wish every video was like 'Drunk [in Love]'." The clip was first released on the iTunes Store on the visual album itself on December 13, 2013, which contained a previously filmed music video for every song and was later uploaded to Beyoncé's Vevo channel three days later, on December 16, 2013.

The visual is almost six and a half minutes long. As the video begins, waves are seen crashing on a night time beach. Nearly a minute later, Beyoncé appears; she is strolling on a beach at night and she seemingly carries a massive trophy while an eerie music is playing in the background. Sporting a sheer negligee that reveals her bra and panties beneath, she twists her body in the sand. The singer also dances seductively against a backdrop of smoke and mouths the song's lyrics, staring at the camera. Beyoncé is later joined by husband Jay-Z, who is wearing a T-shirt and a backwards baseball cap. He raps with his eyes down holding a glass with alcohol in his hand while Beyoncé mouths the words behind him, smiling. The last seconds of the video show Beyoncé dancing and it concludes with close-up shots of the singer's face.

=== Reception ===
On a review of the clip, Kory Glow of Rolling Stone wrote, "The video, as metaphorical as it is, perfectly captures the feeling of the track." A writer for DJ Booth described the video as an "equally steamy cinematic accompaniment" to the song. Carrie Battan of Pitchfork commented that the video "brings the #surfboard line into clear focus". Vanity Fair writer Michelle Collins described the scene where the singer sings the line "surfboard" as hilarious. An editor writing for Rap-Up commended the "intoxicating visuals". USA Today's Elysa Gardner felt that the clip was "sultry" showing the pair "romp and caress on a beach, recalling a night of connubial bliss that lasted into morning" as the song's lyrics. Gerrick D. Kennedy from the Los Angeles Times interpreted the scenes showing the trophy as representing the singer as a "trophy wife". Joe Lynch of Fuse compared Beyoncé's dancing in the sand with Madonna's visual for "Cherish" (1989). Brent DiCrescenzo of the magazine Time Out also felt that the video for "Cherish" strongly influenced the video for "Drunk in Love".

Jon Dolan from Rolling Stone described the video as the second most NSFW from the whole album. An editor from the website Consequence of Sound described Beyoncé's dancing as an R-rated version of Bo Derek's role in the film 10 (1978). In her review, Toronto Star's Malene Arpe called the video "porny". HitFix reviewer Whitney Phaneuf felt that Beyoncé was looking in the camera with pure lust concluding that when Jay-Z appears later, "it's clear that her gaze has been fixed on him". Claire Lobenfeld from Complex felt that the pair "get wet and wild" in the video further elaborating, "For an album that is rooted in love, marriage, and sex, unleashing a video featuring her and her husband frolicking euphorically on the beach is the best first taste." Slate's Forrest Wickman called the clip one of the simplest on the album and noted, "It's not the album's peak, musically or visually, but unconstrained by heavy choreography... it legitimately looks like they're having fun." Maura Johnston of Spin placed the video at number 5 on the magazine's list of the best music videos in 2013 saying that it was a "worthy addition" to the collaborations between Beyoncé and Jay-Z.

The video was nominated in the categories for Best Female Video and Best R&B Video at the 2014 MTV Video Music Awards Japan. It was also nominated for Video of the Year at the 2014 BET Awards. At the 2014 MTV Video Music Awards the video was nominated in the categories for Video of the Year and Best Collaboration, eventually winning the latter. At the 2014 Soul Train Music Awards the clip was nominated in the category for Video of the Year.

The music video on YouTube has received over 735 million views as of May 2024.

== Live performances ==
On January 26, 2014, the couple opened the 56th Annual Grammy Awards in Los Angeles, performing the song live together for the first time. The performance opened with Beyoncé sporting wet-look hair in a leotard and a leather basque, sitting on a chair with her back to the audience. She continued seductively dancing cabaret-style, singing and gyrating on the dark stage surrounded by smoke. Jay-Z appeared to rap his verses dressed in a suit and bow tie. The sexually charged performance ended with a kiss and the two walked off with their arms around each other. Beyoncé's chair dance received comparisons with scenes from the movie Flashdance, the song's music video and the video for "Partition"; VH1's Emily Exton felt that it was one of the best chair dances of all time. The duet was described as "scorching" and "chill inducing" with many critics considering the performance to be a show highlight; Lily Harrison of E! added that the pair "set the bar impossibly high". A Rolling Stone editor felt it was "near flawless". Nadeska Alexis writing for MTV News noted that when the singer started singing the first verses of the song, "you could almost taste the aroma of sex appeal in the air". A negative review came from Beverly Beckham of The Boston Globe who felt that the pair failed to showcase love in the lyrics and performance.

The performance sparked criticisms from some parents on social media who believed the performance was "provocative" and "inappropriate" due to its risqué nature; Melissa Henson, a representative of the Parents Television Council said in a statement that the performance was "suggestive" before adding, "We have seen pretty consistently enough inappropriate material [on awards shows lately], that a lot of parents have written these off." Contrastingly, writing for ThinkProgress, Alyssa Rosenberg said of the controversy: "This may not be the vision of marriage conservatives intended to try to promote [but] if marriage is a product that conservatives desperately want to sell, the smartest thing they could do right now is to hire Beyoncé and Jay-Z as a product spokescouple... they made marriage look fun, and sexy, and a source of mutual professional fulfillment." On public reaction to the sexual performance, Lavanya Ramanathan of The Washington Post wrote: "The Internet exploded, and it's not surprising. This is a couple who sat separately at awards ceremonies when they were dating several years ago." On February 1, 2014, the couple performed the song again during Jay Z's performance at the DirecTv pre-Super Bowl party. Christopher R. Weingarten of Rolling Stone referred to the pair's chemistry as the highlight of the event and said the performance was "smiles and hugs and laughs, with one of the most famous rappers in the world gladly playing hypeman" in contrast to the Grammy performance. Nekesa Mumbi Moody writing for the Associated Press felt that it was the set's highlight. At the 2014 MTV Video Music Awards on August 25, 2014, Beyoncé performed "Drunk in Love" live during a medley consisting of songs from her self-titled album. The performance featured the singer dressed in a bejeweled bodysuit and a singalong from the audience. She started the performance on a set of steps, with numerous dancers in headstands around her and went to the stage afterwards. Nadeska Alexis from MTV News commented that when the song opened, "the crowd really started to lose their composure". Writers of The Hollywood Reporter described the song's performance as "booty-popping".

The song was added to the set list and performed live during the second European leg of The Mrs. Carter Show World Tour in February and March 2014. For the performance, Beyoncé danced on a chair in a catsuit as kaleidoscope of lights illuminated her. Digital Spy's Robert Copsey felt that the track became a stadium sing-along like the other hits performed by the singer. Kitty Empire of The Observer wrote that the singer's ad libs made listeners feel like she "got tipsy and had the hots for her husband". Jay-Z joined her on stage to perform the song together at all six London shows of the leg, as well as at the final tour stop in Lisbon. A professionally recorded live performance of the song with Jay-Z from the tour aired on August 4, 2014, on Beyonce: X10, an HBO series documenting renditions of the song performed during The Mrs. Carter Show World Tour. Erin Strecker from Billboard felt that the choreography from the performance was "instantly iconic". Anna Silman of Variety praised the singer's different sparkling costumes and noted that overally, the rendition was "as sultry and showstopping as you'd imagine". "Drunk in Love" was part of the set list of Beyoncé and Jay-Z's co-headlining On the Run Tour (2014). For the performance of the song, Beyoncé performed a chair dance and was accompanied by Jay-Z for his part which contained a short snippet of Kanye West's "On Sight". While reviewing the opening concert of the tour, Rebecca Thomas writing for MTV News described the performance of the song as "intoxicating". Beyoncé also performed this song on her The Formation World Tour in 2016. In 2018, her and Jay-Z performed the song during their second co-headlining tour, the On the Run II Tour.

In 2023, Beyoncé performed the song as part of her viral private performance for the opening ceremony of Atlantis The Royal resort in Dubai, arranging a complex arabesque vocal riff as she ascended on a platform. The riff went viral on TikTok, prompting fans to challenge themselves to recreate it.

The song, along with "Thique" and "All Up in Your Mind", was included as a special act during the Renaissance World Tour that was only performed at the opening night of the tour, in Stockholm, and a select handful of dates later in the tour's run.

The song was performed during the Cowboy Carter Tour in Paris, France.

== Remixes ==
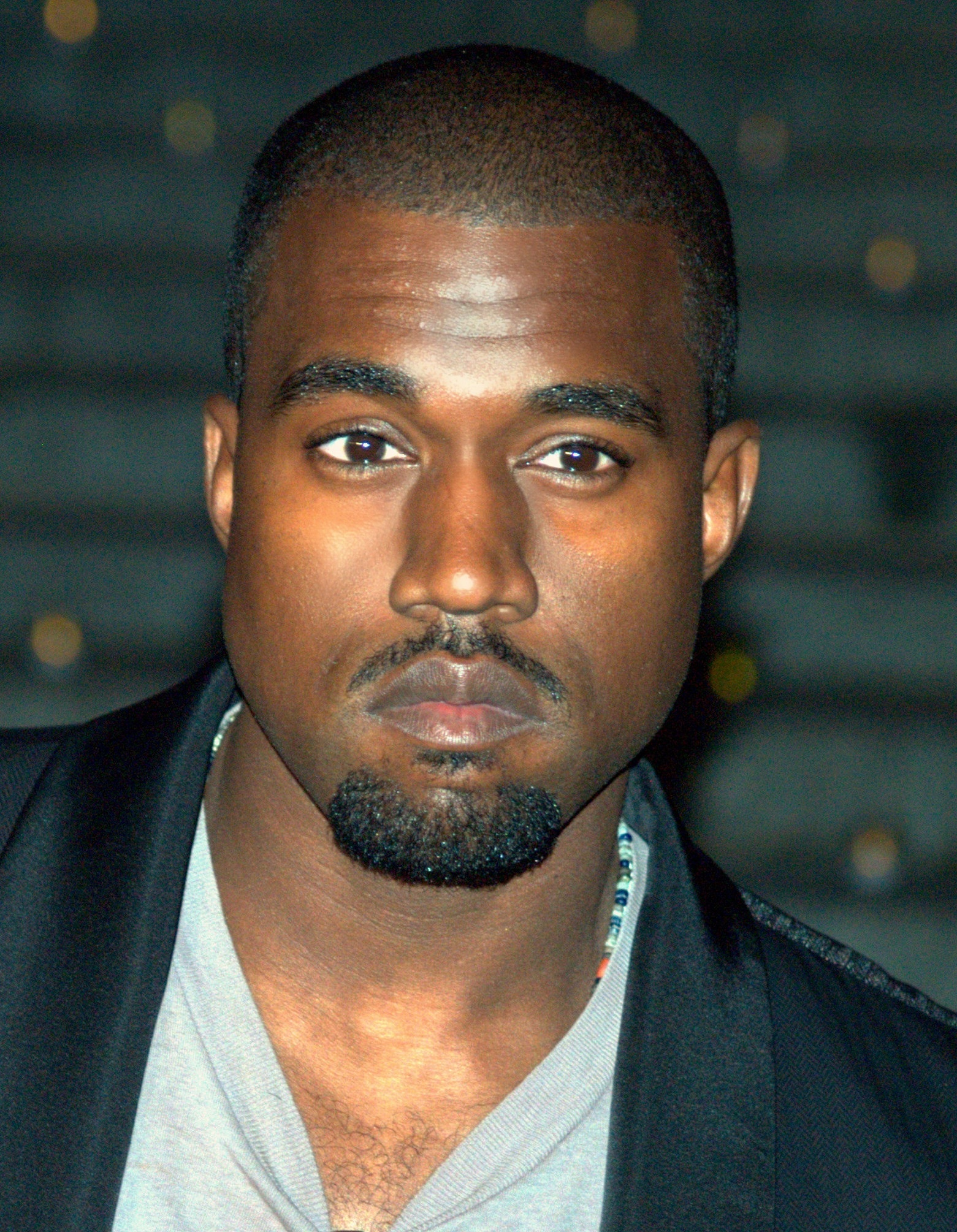
Kanye West (pictured) released an official remix of "Drunk in Love" in February 2014.

The popularity of the song has led to several remixes. In December 2013, American singer Rico Love and American rapper Plies released a remix of "Drunk in Love" in which they sang about their sex experiences. On January 16, 2014, English musician James Blake debuted a remix of the song on BBC Radio 1 using his alter ego Harmonimix considerably altering Beyoncé's voice. Future utilized Auto-Tune on his version of the song, which he released in late January 2014. At BBC Radio 1's Live Lounge, American rapper Angel Haze performed "Drunk in Love", substituting Jay Z's verses with new lines that discuss empowerment and braggadocio. They later released a studio version in April leaving some vocals by Beyoncé from the original; this version was noted for containing more aggression than their live rendition.

On January 27, 2014, DJ MeLo-X performed a remix with visuals at Sean Kelly Gallery in New York City. A video of the remix, titled "Drunk in Lust", was uploaded to YouTube as part of MeLo-X's five-song EP of unauthorized Beyoncé remixes called Yoncé-X. Beyoncé's label asked repeatedly for the remixes to be taken offline, but MeLo-X kept uploading them to new host sites. Eventually, Beyoncé herself watched "Drunk in Lust", and invited MeLo-X to collaborate with Jay-Z on their On the Run Tour. This led to further collaborations on her Lemonade album and subsequent tour.

On February 13, 2014, Detail released a seven-minute version of the song on which he worked for three weeks. It was titled "Drunken Love" and it included unreleased audio elements from the recording of the original song from which several variables of it existed. Pitchfork Media's Carrie Battan described his version as "chopped-up, stretched out, cathedral-ready". On February 14, 2014, American rapper Kanye West, frequent collaborator of Jay-Z, released the official remix of "Drunk in Love", featuring an explicit verse by himself and a slightly modified instrumental produced by himself and longtime collaborator Mike Dean. In his lines, West rapped about his wife Kim Kardashian and referenced the video for his own song, "Bound 2" (2013). A day after the release of the remix, Beyoncé uploaded a 30-second clip in which she played a cowgirl corralling horses as West's vocals played in the background. Miriam Coleman of Rolling Stone felt that West's rework was an "even raunchier spin on the already-adult-themed song". The remix version was later included on the track listing of the platinum edition of Beyoncé, released on November 24, 2014. Diplo produced an EDM-influenced remix of the song, which he released on February 15, 2014. Canadian singer The Weeknd and American rapper T.I. both released their respective remixes on the same date; the former's version featured lyrics about drug use and corruption. On February 18, 2014, American rapper Cassidy released a song titled "Surfboard", with the tag "Drunk in Love G-Mix", which heavily samples "Drunk in Love". On December 18, 2014, Tiësto released a remix of the song after playing it in DJ sets a few months earlier.

== Cover versions ==
English singer Katy B performed a medley of "Drunk in Love" and Tinashe's "Vulnerable" during Rinse FM sessions at London's Metropolis Studios in late February 2014. Sevyn Streeter covered the song live during a concert in March. Ed Sheeran also performed an acoustic cover version on the Elvis Duran and the Morning Show broadcast on April 11 and on 4Music on May 9, 2014. He had sung the beginning of the song for several seconds the month before during On Air with Ryan Seacrest and decided to fully cover it following fan demands. Alternative rock band Grouplove performed a rock-infused cover of the song at the 2014 Coachella Valley Music and Arts Festival. The writers of Billboard magazine described it as "earnest and uneven". Rita Ora covered "Drunk in Love" on May 25, 2014, during Radio 1's Big Weekend in Glasgow and on the French television show Le Before du Grand Journal the following day. In July 2014, Sia performed a cover of the song along with Ed Sheeran and Grouplove on the second episode of VH1's SoundClash. During her performance at the G-A-Y club in London in April 2014, British singer Lily Allen appeared wearing a black bikini and a blond wig emulating Beyoncé's look from the song's video, lip-syncing the lyrics for a drag performance. She appeared on the stage with a trophy in her hand, getting spilled with water from a bucket and danced in a similar way to the singer. Several media outlets and fans on social media alike called it a "mocking" of Beyoncé which Allen further denied on Twitter. For the album 'BBC Radio 1 Live Lounge 2014', singer Angel Haze recorded an acoustic cover of the song, including Jay Z's rap verses. The cover was highly praised by music critics. American rapper Liv included the "surfboard" line in her diss track "Sorry Mrs. Carter". Ariana Bacle of Entertainment Weekly described the reference as "a (disapproving) nod" to the original song, while The Daily Beast's Amy Zimmerman praised Liv for criticizing the effectiveness of Beyoncé's analogy. The mathcore band Oceans Ate Alaska covered "Drunk in Love" in 2014 for the compilation Punk Goes Pop Vol. 6.

In June 2024, musician Tanner Adell (who collaborated with Beyoncé earlier in the year on the song "Blackbiird" as part of her album Cowboy Carter) released a country-infused cover version of the song as part of Apple Music Nashville Sessions: Beyoncé Covered, a special collection of Beyoncé covers by up-and-coming Black country artists.

== Lawsuit ==
Hungarian singer Mónika Juhász Miczura filed for a lawsuit for using her song "Bajba, Bajba Pelem" in the beginning of the song.

== Credits and personnel ==
Credits adapted from Beyoncé's website.

Song credits

- Written by Noel Fisher, Beyoncé Knowles, Shawn Carter, Jordan Asher, Andre Eric Proctor, Timothy Mosley, Jerome Harmon, Brian Soko and Rasool Ricardo Diaz
- Beyoncé Knowles – vocals, production, vocal production
- Boots – additional production, additional vocals, instruments
- Stuart White – recording, mixing
- Ramon Rivas – assistant engineering
- Tony Maserati – mixing
- Tyler Scott – assistant mix engineering
- Justin Hergett – assistant mix engineering
- James Krausse – mix engineering
- Derek Dixie – mix consultation, additional sounds
- Tom Coyne – mastering
- Aya Marrill – mastering

Video credits

- Director – Hype Williams
- Creative director – Todd Tourso
- Director of photography – Jeffrey Kelly
- Executive producer – Erinn Williams
- Producer – Hype Williams
- Production company – Parkwood Entertainment, HW Worldwide LLC
- Stylist – Lysa Cooper
- Additional styling – TY Hunter, Raquel Smith
- Choreography – Kwasi Fordjour
- Editor – Josiah Spencer for Wild Child Editorial
- Brand manager – Melissa Vargas
- Hair – Neal Farinah
- Make-up – Francesca Tolot
- Nails – Lisa Logan
- Color correction – Wild Child
- Visual effects – Light of Day, Wild Child
- Photography – Mason Poole

== Charts ==
=== Weekly charts ===
Chart (2013–2014)	Peak position
Australia (ARIA)	22
Australia Urban (ARIA)	5
Belgium (Ultratop 50 Flanders)	13
Belgium (Ultratop Flanders Urban)	4
Belgium (Ultratop 50 Wallonia)	23
Canada Hot 100 (Billboard)	23
Canada CHR/Top 40 (Billboard)	15
Canada Hot AC (Billboard)	42
CIS Airplay (TopHit)	198
Czech Republic Airplay (ČNS IFPI)	83
Denmark (Tracklisten)	15
Europe (Euro Digital Songs)	8
Finland (The Official Finnish Charts)	19
France (SNEP)	9
Germany (GfK)	70
Ireland (IRMA)	10
Israel (Media Forest)	4
Italy (FIMI)	100
Japan (Billboard Japan Hot 100)	92
Lebanon (Lebanese Top 20)	5
Netherlands (Dutch Top 40)	36
Netherlands (Single Top 100)	39
New Zealand (Recorded Music NZ)	7
Portugal Digital Songs (Billboard)	9
Romania (Airplay 100)	75
Scotland (Official Charts Company)	13
Slovakia Airplay (ČNS IFPI)	46
South Africa Airplay (EMA)	1
South Korea International Singles (Gaon)	25
Suriname (Nationale Top 40)	1
Sweden (Sverigetopplistan)	16
Switzerland (Schweizer Hitparade)	40
UK Singles (Official Charts)	9
UK R&B (Official Charts Company)	3
US Billboard Hot 100	2
US Dance Club Songs (Billboard)	12
US Hot R&B/Hip-Hop Songs (Billboard)	1
US R&B/Hip-Hop Airplay (Billboard)	1
US Pop Airplay (Billboard)	13
US Rhythmic Airplay (Billboard)	1

==== Remix ====
Chart (2014)	Peak position
US Bubbling Under R&B/Hip-Hop Singles (Billboard)	5

=== Year-end charts ===
Chart (2014)	Position
Australia Urban (ARIA)	24
Belgium (Ultratop Flanders)	72
Belgium (Ultratop Flanders Urban)	13
Belgium (Ultratop Wallonia)	77
Canada (Canadian Hot 100)	93
France (SNEP)	47
Sweden (Sverigetopplistan)	86
Taiwan (Hito Radio)	38
UK Singles (Official Charts Company)	57
US Billboard Hot 100	35
US Hot R&B/Hip-Hop Songs (Billboard)	7
US Rhythmic (Billboard)	15

Chart (2015)	Position
Australia Urban (ARIA)	43

Chart (2016)	Position
Belgian Catalog Singles Chart (Wallonia)	99

== Certifications ==
Region	Certification	Certified units/sales
Australia (ARIA)	3× Platinum	210,000^{‡}
Canada (Music Canada)	4× Platinum	320,000^{‡}
Germany (BVMI)	Gold	150,000^{‡}
Italy (FIMI)	Gold	25,000^{‡}
New Zealand (RMNZ)	3× Platinum	90,000^{‡}
Portugal (AFP)	Gold	10,000^{‡}
Spain (Promusicae)	Gold	30,000^{‡}
United Kingdom (BPI)	2× Platinum	1,200,000^{‡}
United States (RIAA)	8× Platinum	8,000,000^{‡}
Streaming
Denmark (IFPI Danmark)	Platinum	2,600,000^{†}
^{‡} Sales+streaming figures based on certification alone.^{†} Streaming-only figures based on certification alone.

== Release history ==
Country	Date	Format	Label
France	December 16, 2013	Radio airplay	Sony Music Entertainment
United States	December 17, 2013	Urban contemporary radio	Columbia Records

== See also ==
- List of Billboard Hot 100 top 10 singles in 2014
- List of Billboard Rhythmic number-one songs of the 2010s
- List of number-one R&B/hip-hop songs of 2014 (U.S.)
- List of number-one singles of 2014 (South Africa)
- List of UK top 10 singles in 2014
