= Rasool Diaz =

American record producer

- Also known as: Sool, SoolGotHits
- Born: Rasool Ricardo Elijah Eugene Diaz; May 1, 1990 (age 36); Bloomington, Illinois, United States
- Genres: R&B; soul; hip hop
- Occupations: Songwriter; record producer
- Label: Warner Chappell Music Publishing
- Member of: The Order

Rasool Ricardo Elijah Eugene Diaz (born May 1, 1990), also known as SoolGotHits, is an American songwriter and record producer, best known for co-writing and co-producing Beyoncé's 2013 single "Drunk in Love" from her eponymous fifth album, winning a Grammy Award for Best R&B Song in 2015.

== Career ==
Diaz befriended fellow R&B/Hip-Hop producers Andre Eric Proctor and Brian Soko while attending university classes for sound engineering together in Tampa, Florida, and they decided to form production group "The Order" under the tutelage of record producer Detail. Each producer in the group works on their own music independently, before coming together to review and critique each other. After pitching their productions to a number of labels and artists, their first break came when "No Worries", one of their first co-written and co-produced songs, was placed onto Lil' Wayne's 2012 mixtape Dedication 4 and was chosen as a single.

== Selected songwriting and production credits ==
Credits are courtesy of Discogs, Tidal, Spotify, and AllMusic.

Title	Year	Artist	Album
"No Worries"	2012	Lil Wayne	Dedication 4 and I Am Not a Human Being II
"Curtains" (Featuring Boo)	2013	Lil Wayne	I Am Not a Human Being II
"100K" (Featuring 2 Chainz)	2013	Nelly	M.O.
"Ready" (Featuring Future)	2013	B.o.B	Underground Luxury
"Drunk in Love" (Featuring Jay-Z)	2013	Beyoncé	Beyoncé
"Jealous"	2013	Beyoncé	Beyoncé
"Standing on the Sun Remix" (Featuring Mr. Vegas)	2014	Beyoncé	Beyoncé: Platinum Edition
"Pretend" (Featuring ASAP Rocky)	2014	Tinashe	Aquarius
"Do Not Disturb" (Featuring Chris Brown)	2014	Teyana Taylor	VII
"Maybe" (Featuring Pusha T & Yo Gotti)	2014	Teyana Taylor	VII
"True Colors" (Featuring Nicki Minaj)	2014	Wiz Khalifa	Blacc Hollywood
"Wamables"	2014	Nicki Minaj	The Pinkprint
"Put You In A Room"	2014	Nicki Minaj	The Pinkprint
"4 My Dawgs" (Featuring Lil Wayne)	2015	Tyga	The Gold Album: 18th Dynasty
"All Right"	2016	Future	Purple Reign
"I'm So Real"	2017	Young Dolph	Bulletproof
"Yellow Tape" (Featuring 21 Savage)	2017	Yo Gotti	I Still Am
"LLC"	2018	Nicki Minaj	Queen
"Miami"	2018	Nicki Minaj	Queen
"123"	2018	Smokepurpp & Murda Beatz	Bless Yo Trap
"Do Not Disturb" (Featuring Lil Yachty and Offset)	2018	Smokepurpp & Murda Beatz	Bless Yo Trap
"Mayo"	2018	Smokepurpp & Murda Beatz	Bless Yo Trap
"Bumblebee"	2018	Smokepurpp & Murda Beatz	Bless Yo Trap
"Workin Me"	2018	Quavo	Quavo Huncho
"Champagne Rosé" (Featuring Madonna & Cardi B)	2018	Quavo	Quavo Huncho
"I'm Not Goin'" (Featuring Kevin Gates)	2018	Gucci Mane	Evil Genius
"Mama" (Featuring Kanye West & Nicki Minaj)	2018	6ix9ine	Dummy Boy
"Far Gone" (Featuring Lil Baby)	2018	Ski Mask the Slump God	Stokeley
"Guess Who"	2018	Ace Hood	Trust the Process II: Undefeated
"Lost & Found"	2019	Cordae	The Lost Boy
"Night Shift" (Featuring Lil Baby)	2019	Dave East	Survival
"Stevie"	2019	Smokepurpp	Deadstar 2
"Rebound" (Featuring Joey Badass)	2019	Tayla Parx	We Need to Talk
"Legendary" (Featuring Gunna)	2019	Tyga	Legendary
"Love to Fuck"	2019	Tyga	Legendary
"Hate on Me" (Featuring Lil Tjay)	2020	YG	My Life 4Hunnid
"Relentless"	2020	Polo G	The Goat
"Big Shit"	2020	A Boogie wit da Hoodie	Artist 2.0
"Too Far"	2020	Jidenna	Godfather of Harlem (soundtrack)
"Malibu" (Featuring Polo G)	2021	Migos	Culture III
"Antisocial" (Featuring Juice Wrld)	2021	Migos	Culture III
"Double Standards"	2021	Don Toliver	Life of a Don
"Mama's Hood"	2022	Cordae	From a Birds Eye View
"Solteiras Shake" (With DJ Gabriel do Borel)	2023	Ludmilla	Vilã
"Free My N****"	2023	Sexyy Red	Hood Hottest Princess

== Awards and nominations ==
Year	Ceremony	Award	Result	Ref
2014	BMI Awards	Most Performed R&B/Hip-Hop Song (No Worries)	Won	
2014	BMI Awards	Billboard Hot #1 R&B/Hip-Hop Song (Drunk in Love)	Won	
2014	BMI Awards	Billboard Hot #1 R&B/Hip-Hop Airplay (Drunk in Love)	Won	
2015	57th Annual Grammy Awards	Grammy Award for Best R&B Song (Drunk in Love)	Won	
