= Rich As Fuck =

Single by Lil Wayne featuring 2 Chainz

from the album I Am Not a Human Being II
- Released: April 9, 2013
- Recorded: 2012
- Genre: Hip hop
- Length: 3:40
- Label: Young Money; Cash Money; Republic
- Songwriters: Dwayne Carter; Tauheed Epps; Tyler Williams; Nikhil Seetharam
- Producers: T-Minus; Nikhil (co.)

Lil Wayne singles chronology
"Tapout" (2013)	"Rich As Fuck" (2013)	"Ready to Go" (2013)

2 Chainz singles chronology
"R.I.P." (2013)	"Rich As Fuck" (2013)	"We Own It (Fast & Furious)" (2013)

"Rich As Fuck" (edited for explicit album as "Rich As F**k" and for clean album as "Rich As F***") is a song by American hip hop recording artist Lil Wayne, sent to urban radio on April 9, 2013, as the third and final single from his tenth studio album, I Am Not a Human Being II (2013). The song, produced by T-Minus and Nikhil Seetharam, features a guest appearance from fellow rapper 2 Chainz. The song has since peaked at number 38 on the US Billboard Hot 100 and at number 11 on the Billboard Hot R&B/Hip-Hop Songs.

== Background ==
On January 6, 2013, the song "Rich As Fuck," featuring rapper 2 Chainz leaked unmastered and was originally set to be the second single from I Am Not a Human Being II, but "Love Me" was released as a single instead. On April 9, 2013, "Rich As Fuck" was released as the third and final single from the album. The official version of the song was remastered and the first and second verse were switched around, compared to the leaked version.

== Critical reception ==
"Rich As Fuck" was met with generally positive reviews from music critics. David Jefferies called the song "a winner with an enticing and eerie beat from T-Minus." Jody Rosen of Rolling Stone praised Lil Wayne's lyricism on the song and his "nimble musicality of his vocal tone and flow." Dean Van Nguyen of PopMatters said the "creeping funk beat on "Rich As Fuck" inspire Wayne to one of his sharpest flows on the album." Jon Hadusek of Consequence of Sound said the song had an old-school feel, and called the song I Am Not a Human Being's "finest moment." Jon Caramanica of The New York Times called 2 Chainz appearance on the song impressive. Brandon Soderberg of Spin also praised 2 Chainz for having a "charismatic presence on the song." Jayson Greene of Pitchfork Media said the Bay Area-influenced clap instrumental of the song work around him, not with him.

Complex ranked "Rich As Fuck" number 18 on their list of the 50 best songs of 2013, saying "The song might not push the limits of art, but when this comes on at the right time, it's the jam, and unlike a lot of the other big hits of the year, it didn't get played out."

== Music video ==
The music video was directed by Parris in early 2013, and was released on March 22, 2013 on MTV. The video was released on YouTube through his VEVO one day later, on March 23, 2013. The video is age-limited and needs verification for viewing.

== Chart performance ==
=== Weekly charts ===
Chart (2013)	Peak position
Belgium (Ultratop Flanders Urban)	46
US Billboard Hot 100	38
US Hot R&B/Hip-Hop Songs (Billboard)	11

=== Year-end charts ===
Annual chart rankings
Chart (2013)	Position
US Hot R&B/Hip-Hop Songs (Billboard)	28
US Rap Songs (Billboard)	21
US Streaming Songs (Billboard)	71

== Certifications ==
Region	Certification	Certified units/sales
United States (RIAA)	3× Platinum	3,000,000^{‡}
^{‡} Sales+streaming figures based on certification alone.

== Release history ==
Country	Date	Format	Label
United States	April 9, 2013	Urban radio	Young Money Entertainment, Cash Money Records
