= Trust the Process II: Undefeated =

Mixtape by Ace Hood
- Released: May 11, 2018
- Recorded: 2017–18
- Genre: Hip hop; trap
- Length: 73:49
- Label: Hood Nation; Empire
- Producer: 30 Roc; BeatsxKD; Big Korey; Bulletproof Beats; Chase the Money; DJ Montay; Foreign Teck; GT; Izze the Producer; Jazzfeezy; John G.; Kid Class; Kid Wond3r; Kilo Keys; M. Lee; Murda Beatz; Nik D; Nik Dean; OZ; Rasool Diaz; Scena; Tariq Beats; Twon Beatz; Wallis Lane; Yung Lan; Yung Sensei Wu

Ace Hood chronology
Trust the Process (2017)	Trust the Process II: Undefeated (2018)

Trust the Process II: Undefeated is a mixtape by American rapper Ace Hood. It was released on May 11, 2018, by Hood Nation and Empire Distribution. It features guest appearances from Slim Diesel and Scotty ATL. The production was handled by Foreign Teck, Murda Beatz, Wallis Lane, Kid Class, Chase the Money, Yung Lan, and OZ, among others. The mixtape was released on Ace Hood's thirtieth birthday. It is a sequel to Trust the Process, which was released the year prior.

== Track listing ==
No.	Title	Writer(s)	Producer(s)	Length
1.	"Intro (Earth Strong)"	Antoine McCollister		0:15
2.	"80's Baby"	McCollister; Montay Humphrey; Korey Roberson	DJ Montay; Big Korey	2:33
3.	"3 Bless"	McCollister; Jaswinder Singh; Mike Lee; Chris Meesen	Jazzfeezy; M. Lee; Scena	2:33
4.	"Undefeated"	McCollister; Alkhaaliq Omar Lawrence; Tranell Sims	Kid Wond3r; Trabeats	4:11
5.	"Beast Mode" (Intro)	McCollister		0:27
6.	"Beast Mode"	McCollister	Jay 808	2:53
7.	"Chosen"	McCollister; Izell Staton	Izze the Producer	3:02
8.	"Right On" (featuring Slim Diesel)	McCollister; Michael Hernandez; Nikolas Dean	Foreign Teck; Nik Dean	2:45
9.	"Fwea" (featuring Slim Diesel)	McCollister; Milan Modi; Brain Anamayatana; Paul Cabbin	Yung Lan; Kilo Keys; The Beat Plug; Cabbin	3:13
10.	"Live, Love, Shine"	McCollister; Modi; Anamayatana	Yung Lan; Yung Sensei Wu; Kilo Keys	3:22
11.	"Eye"	McCollister	Jay 808	3:29
12.	"Nobody Panic"	McCollister; Kevin Davis	BeatsxKD	3:17
13.	"Element"	McCollister	Jay 808; Coop The Truth	3:07
14.	"Tango"	McCollister; Hernandez; Altariq Crapps; Ozan Yildirim	Foreign Teck; Tariq Beats; OZ	1:41
15.	"Ace Hood – Speaks" (Interlude)	McCollister; Yildirim	OZ	0:43
16.	"Be Calm"	McCollister; Hernandez; Yildirim; Nik Frascona	Foreign Teck; OZ; Nik D	3:16
17.	"Devil Get Off Me" (featuring Slim Diesel)	McCollister	Kid Class	3:13
18.	"A Rose"	McCollister; Chase Rose	Chase the Money	3:00
19.	"Can't Keep Running"	McCollister	Bulletproof Beats	3:13
20.	"Testify"	McCollister; Hernandez; Garren Herron; Nima Jahanbin; Paimon Jahanbin	Foreign Teck; GT; Wallis Lane	2:54
21.	"Keep It the Same"	McCollister; Davis	BeatsxKD	1:51
22.	"When U Wake"	McCollister; Hernandez; N. Jahanbin; P. Jahanbin	Foreign Teck; Wallis Lane	2:15
23.	"Bag Play"	McCollister; Samuel Gloade; Antwon Hicks	30 Roc; Twon Beatz	3:12
24.	"Ace Hood – Questions" (Interlude)	McCollister		0:36
25.	"Real Until the End" (Interlude)	McCollister		1:42
26.	"Guess Who"	McCollister; Shane Lindstrom; Rasool Diaz	Murda Beatz; Diaz	3:06
27.	"They Said"	McCollister; Lindstrom; John Gonzalez	Murda Beatz; John G.	3:53
28.	"Each Other" (featuring Scotty ATL)	McCollister; Walter Williams		3:22
29.	"Outro (New Beginnings)"	McCollister		0:44
