= No Worries (Lil Wayne song) =

Single by Lil Wayne featuring Detail

from the album Dedication 4 and I Am Not a Human Being II
- Released: September 3, 2012
- Recorded: 2012
- Genre: Comedy hip hop
- Length: 3:42
- Label: Young Money; Cash Money; Republic
- Songwriters: Dwayne Carter; Noel Fisher; Andre Proctor; Rasool Diaz; Brian Soko; Jermaine Preyan; Bryan Williams; Brian Smith
- Producers: Detail; The Order

Lil Wayne singles chronology
"Celebration" (2012)	"No Worries" (2012)	"Bandz a Make Her Dance" (2012)

Detail singles chronology
"No Worries" (2012)

"No Worries" is a song by American hip hop recording artist Lil Wayne, released on September 3, 2012, as the lead single from his tenth studio album, I Am Not a Human Being II. It features vocals from Detail and was produced by Detail himself, along with the production team The Order.

== Background ==
The song was originally set to be Wayne's next single from his upcoming album. After many push backs on the release of his twelfth mixtape, he decided to include the song on Dedication 4 (2012), and was officially released September 3, 2012, as the first single from his then-upcoming tenth studio album I Am Not a Human Being II (2013). Complex named the song #50 on their list of best songs of 2012. The song was also featured on his greatest hits album I Am Music in 2023.

== Music video ==
The music video premiered on MTV on November 21, 2012, and then on BET's 106 & Park on November 26, 2012, and was directed by Colin Tilley. The video pays homage to the film Fear and Loathing in Las Vegas. It features a cameo appearance from rapper Birdman.

== Charts ==
=== Weekly charts ===
Chart (2012–2013)	Peak position
US Billboard Hot 100	29
US Hot R&B/Hip-Hop Songs (Billboard)	7
US Hot Rap Songs (Billboard)	7

=== Year-end charts ===
Chart (2012)	Position
US Hot R&B/Hip-Hop Songs (Billboard)	100

== Certifications ==
Region	Certification	Certified units/sales
United States (RIAA)	2× Platinum	2,000,000^{‡}
^{‡} Sales+streaming figures based on certification alone.
