= Sorry Mrs. Carter =

Single by Liv
- Released: August 4, 2014
- Recorded: 2014
- Genre: Hip hop
- Length: 3:44
- Label: Self-released
- Songwriter: Liv

"Sorry Mrs. Carter" is a song recorded by American rapper Liv. The song was released on August 4, 2014, through her YouTube and SoundCloud accounts. Promoted as an "open letter" to American singer Beyoncé, Liv wrote and recorded the song in response to Nicki Minaj's remix of the single "Flawless" (2013). It is an uptempo, hip hop song with lyrics that revolve around Liv's alleged relationship with rapper Jay Z and Beyoncé's image as a wife and role model. The track's lyrical content portrays Liv as the victim of Jay Z's advances and the object of Beyoncé's jealousy.

"Sorry Mrs. Carter" has received primarily negative feedback from critics, who found its message to be confusing, and viewed it as a marketing ploy. In the single's accompanying music video, Liv raps the lyrics while wearing risqué clothing. The video had over two million views in less than a week after its release. "Sorry Mrs. Carter" was listed by HipHopDX in the top ten of the most popular hip hop singles for two weeks in 2014.

== Background ==
American rapper Liv self-released "Sorry Mrs. Carter" on August 4, 2014, through her YouTube and SoundCloud accounts. She wrote the song as an "open letter" to American singer Beyoncé. During an interview with Entertainment Tonight, Liv explained that the she recorded the song and its accompanying music video after hearing the remix of Beyoncé's single "Flawless" (2013) featuring Nicki Minaj. Liv uploaded her song shortly after the release of the "Flawless" remix. Prior to the single's release, tabloids had frequently identified Liv as Jay Z's mistress.

Despite being phrased as an apology, the song was described as a diss track against Beyoncé by media outlets. Liv had previously criticized other celebrities, such as Kim Kardashian, Kanye West, and Kendrick Lamar, in her series of songs entitled "The Invasion". Bryan Goldberg of Bustle wrote that "The Invasion" portrays Liv as pursuing a "quest to dominate the hip-hop world and vanquish all of the celebrities she hates."

== Composition and lyrics ==
"Sorry Mrs. Carter" is an uptempo, hip hop song that lasts three minutes and 44 seconds. It features a sample from Outkast's single "Ms. Jackson" (2000). Tim Surrette of TV Guide noted that the song heavily relies on the sample. In the lyrics, Liv details her alleged relationship with rapper Jay Z. She also criticizes Beyoncé as a poor wife and role model for young women. Throughout the song, she portrays herself as a victim of Jay Z's flirtations and Beyoncé's jealousy. According to HipHopDX, the track consists of "sharp-edged criticism" towards both artists.

The song opens with spoken word prelude, which includes: "I was gonna respect you, but since you crossed over into my lane, it's time to check it." The lyrics contain references to Jay Z's songs "I Just Wanna Love U (Give It 2 Me)" (2000), "99 Problems" (2004), and "Girls, Girls, Girls" (2001), as well as Beyoncé's "Flawless", "Run the World (Girls)" (2011), "Single Ladies (Put a Ring on It)" (2008), and "Drunk in Love" (2013). Liv also alludes to rumors that Jay Z had a relationship with British singer Rita Ora. On the track, the rapper denies having an affair with Jay Z, but claims they share an emotional intimacy by rapping lyrics such as "F–k f–king to the top, me and Jay never screwed" and "We were attracted like magnets, us crossing paths was no accident." During the chorus, she sings "Sorry Mrs. Carter, this is for real" before criticizing Beyoncé's influence on women; the lyrics include, "Why don't you tell these girls how to be wives? Why don't tell these girls how to act around yo' husband?" The song ends with a second spoken word section, in which Liv advances that she could replace Beyoncé and says: "The invasion has begun."

== Critical reception ==
"Sorry Mrs. Carter" received primarily negative responses from music critics upon its release. Courtney Carter of The Huffington Post cited the song and its music video as examples of society's glorification of the side chick. She criticized Liv for promoting an alleged encounter with a married man as "her claim to fame" and "claim to self-esteem." TV Guide's Tim Surette described Liv's performance as worse than "a bunch of pots and pans clanging together." The single was described as "embarrassing" and a "trainwreck" by In Touch Weekly and Bustle.

Critics have also commented on the song's message. Ariana Bacle of Entertainment Weekly was confused over Liv's intentions for the song, questioning if the rapper was apologizing to Beyoncé about her flirtation with Jay Z or his alleged, inappropriate behavior with other women. Bacle chose the lyrics, "You got a good girl, why she messing with a bad guy?" as a point of confusion, in which the song transitions to become more "directed at Mrs. Carter-Knowles' decisions." In Touch Weekly's Carly Sitzer viewed the track as "ultra-confusing", and cast doubt on Liv's claims of being a victim and the object of Beyoncé's jealousy. Echoing this thought, Bustle's Kaitlin Reilly was critical of Liv's interpretation of herself as a victim in the song's lyrics.

The single has been considered a publicity ploy by media commentators. Inquisitr's Addam Corré expressed doubts over the authenticity of the song, and equated it to a publicity stunt. The recording was described as Liv's attempt to gain wider exposure by Boston Herald's Kevin O'Leary, who called her a "small-time rapper." The Miami Herald wrote that releasing a song about Beyoncé was "one surefire way to get publicity for your song." Beyoncé's fans reacted negatively to the single on social media. Following the release of Beyoncé's "Sorry" in 2016, it was speculated that Liv was the "Becky with the good hair" referenced on the track in response to "Sorry Mrs. Carter".

"Sorry Mrs. Carter" did earn some positive reviews. Amy Zimmerman of The Daily Beast called the song a "fantastic Garage band gem", and jokingly described Liv as either "totally insane or the future first female president". HipHopDX included it on the list of the top ten most popular hip hop singles for the weeks of August 9, 2014, and August 23, 2014.

== Music video ==
An accompanying music video for the single premiered on Liv's YouTube account on August 4, 2014. According to Sharifa Daniels of Vibe, the video was homemade, with the rapper being the main person behind its production. In the video, Liv wears risqué clothing while applying lip gloss and examining herself in a mirror. She is also shown dressed in a bikini and shawl, and drinking wine to symbolize the breakdown of Beyoncé's marriage to Jay-Z. She performs an "exaggerated eye roll" while mocking the "Surfbort" lyric from Beyoncé's "Drunk in Love". Images of tabloid covers featuring Liv, and headlines about her alleged affair with Jay-Z, are shown prominently throughout the video, with one of them including her interview with Life & Style. The clip ends with a panning shot across Liv's body. The video had over two million views in less than a week following its release.

Critical reception of the music video was negative. It was described as a "cringe video" by SPIN 1038's Georgie Crawford, and "that godawful video" by Cate Sutherland of Life & Style. Lauren Weigle of Heavy.com viewed the video as "just another log on the fire for the already fueled divorce rumors surrounding Jay Z and Beyoncé." It was called "such an obvious publicity stunt that it's cringeworthy" by Bustle's Kaitlin Reilly, who concluded by comparing the music video to a celebrity's sex tape.

== Release history ==
Country	Date	Format	Label
Worldwide	August 4, 2014	Video-sharing	Self-released
Worldwide	August 4, 2014	Streaming	Self-released
