= My Homies Still =

2012 single by Lil Wayne featuring Big Sean

Single by Lil Wayne featuring Big Sean
- Released: June 5, 2012
- Recorded: 2011
- Genre: Hip hop
- Length: 4:07 (single version); 3:51 (album version)
- Label: Young Money; Cash Money; Republic
- Songwriters: Lil Wayne; Big Sean; Streetrunner; Raymond Diaz; Mike Aiello
- Producers: Streetrunner; Sarom

Lil Wayne singles chronology
"I Can Only Imagine" (2012)	"My Homies Still" (2012)	"Pop That" (2012)

Big Sean singles chronology
"Till I Die" (2012)	"My Homies Still" (2012)	"As Long as You Love Me" (2012)

"My Homies Still" is a song by American rapper Lil Wayne featuring fellow American rapper Big Sean, released on June 5, 2012, as a standalone single. It was also included on the deluxe version of his tenth studio album I Am Not a Human Being II (2013). The song was produced by Streetrunner and Sarom. It reached number 38 on the Billboard Hot 100. A remix featuring Young Jeezy appears on Wayne's Dedication 4 mixtape.

== Background ==
In an interview with hip-hop magazine Complex on January 25, 2012, Cash Money Records co-founder Birdman revealed that Lil Wayne had finished recording material for an album titled I Am Not a Human Being II. The album would serve as a sequel to I Am Not a Human Being (2010), an album released whilst Wayne was serving a prison sentence for illegal possession of a weapon. Later, Wayne revealed to MTV that he had taken great care whilst recording the music for I Am Not a Human Being II and paid greater attention to quality control than he had whilst putting together the original I Am Not a Human Being, admitting he had "rushed" the recording of the latter in order to complete it before beginning his jail sentence. The first single from I Am Not a Human Being II, "My Homies Still", was premiered online on June 1, 2012: Universal Republic Records sent the song to digital retailers on June 5, 2012, and solicited the song to rhythmic contemporary radio stations on June 12, 2012.

== Dedication 4 version ==
"My Homies Still"

Song by Young Jeezy, Jae Millz and Gudda Gudda

from the album Dedication 4
- Recorded: 2011
- Genre: Hip hop
- Length: 2:57
- Label: Young Money
- Songwriters: Lil Wayne; Big Sean; Streetrunner; Raymond Diaz; Mike Aiello
- Producers: Streetrunner; Sarom

A different version of the song appeared on Lil Wayne's Dedication 4 mixtape performed by Young Jeezy, Jae Millz and Gudda Gudda instead of Lil Wayne and Big Sean. This version is slightly shorter than the original.

== Controversy ==
On May 23, 2012, American rapper Pusha T released a song titled "Exodus 23:1" (featuring singer and producer The-Dream), in which several of his lyrics appear to contain insults aimed at Wayne – igniting a feud between the two rappers. Two days later, Wayne premiered a song titled "Goulish" online, in which several of his lyrics directly insult Pusha T, including the song's opening line "Fuck Pusha T and everybody that love him". As both Pusha T and Big Sean are signed to the same record label – Kanye West's GOOD Music – members of the media speculated whether that, by association, Wayne was intending to insult Sean as well. The media also speculated that "My Homies Still" must have been recorded before the feud began, a belief which was later confirmed to be true by Young Money Entertainment president Mack Maine. Despite the feud, Maine confirmed that he would not delete Sean's vocals from the song, feeling that to do so would detract from the song's quality. In a later interview with Complex, Sean stated that he remained friends with both Pusha T and Wayne, and expressed his desire for the feud to end, calling it pointless and "weak".

== Writing and composition ==
"My Homies Still" is a hip hop song of four minutes and seven seconds in length. Wayne and Sean's lyrics on the song both contain numerous free association punchlines: Rick Florino, reviewing the song for Artistdirect, noted Sean's ability to adapt his flow for songs with certain styles, writing that Sean exudes "his own savoir-faire and style". The song's lyrics are backed by a "bouncy" and "spastic" production, which contains "chaotic 808-drumming" similar to that found on Sean's single "Dance (A$$)" from his debut album Finally Famous (2011). The line "go stupid", found in the chorus of "My Homies Still", is also interpolated from "Dance (A$$)". A reviewer for DJBooth felt Streetrunner and Sarom's production to be "the type of high energy, skittering beat that Wayne has made his trademark".

== Chart performance ==
For the chart issue dated June 16, 2012, "My Homies Still" debuted on the US Hot R&B/Hip-Hop Songs chart at number 60. The song peaked at number 20 for the chart issue dated August 18, 2012, in its ninth week on the chart. Following its release to digital retailers in the United States, "My Homies Still" debuted and peaked at number 38 on the US Billboard Hot 100 for the chart issue dating June 23, 2012.

== Music video ==
A music video for "My Homies Still", directed by Parris, premiered on the music show 106 & Park on July 17, 2012. The video, set mostly in a suburban environment, begins with several shots of white mannequins holding various poses, some with missing limbs. Wayne is then shown exiting a white house, and begins to walk through the garden: as he performs the song, the garden is shown to contain an elephant, a disassembled mannequin, and a woman in a blue dress sitting on a toilet. After a panda is shown dancing, the elephant then changes color to pink, and a man and dog are shown to have each other's heads superimposed onto each other's bodies. Big Sean now begins to perform his section of the song, and is seen sitting in a blue chair whilst moving down the street, alongside a skeleton sitting in a red chair.

After further shots of mannequins and a woman dressed in feathers trapped in a cage, Wayne and Sean appear upside down inside an unidentified room, whilst Wayne performs the next section of the song: bugs are seen crawling all over the walls of the room. This scene then alternates with shots of Wayne at night, on a skateboard – performing the song in both cases. Several female heads (although still seemingly alive) appear as trophies on the wall. The video then cuts to a group of people having dinner at a long table: upon the opening of a platter, Sean's head is seen on the platter as he raps his lyrics. Wayne, his daughter Reginae Carter and fellow rappers Birdman and Mack Maine are then shown in a cinema alongside 12 skeletons. The video ends with a return to the night scene, and Wayne skateboarding off into the distance.

== Track listing ==
- Digital download
1. "My Homies Still" (featuring Big Sean) – 4:07

== Charts ==
=== Weekly charts ===
Chart (2012)	Peak position
US Billboard Hot 100	38
US Hot R&B/Hip-Hop Songs (Billboard)	20
US Hot Rap Songs (Billboard)	16

=== Year-end charts ===
Chart (2012)	Position
US Hot R&B/Hip-Hop Songs (Billboard)	98

== Certifications ==
Region	Certification	Certified units/sales
United States (RIAA)	Platinum	1,000,000^{*}
^{*} Sales figures based on certification alone.

== Remix ==
The official remix for "My Homies Still" was released as the ninth track on Lil Wayne's Dedication 4 mixtape. The remix features guest verses from Young Money labelmates Jae Millz and Gudda Gudda, as well as Jeezy. Although this is the official remix to the single, Lil Wayne doesn't appear on this version of the song.

== Radio and release history ==
Country	Date	Format	Label
Australia	June 5, 2012	Digital download	Universal Records
Canada	June 5, 2012	Digital download	Universal Records
France	June 5, 2012	Digital download	Universal Records
Germany	June 5, 2012	Digital download	Universal Records
Ireland	June 5, 2012	Digital download	Universal Records
Netherlands	June 5, 2012	Digital download	Universal Records
New Zealand	June 5, 2012	Digital download	Universal Records
United Kingdom	June 5, 2012	Digital download	Universal Records
United States	June 5, 2012	Digital download	Universal Records
United States	June 11, 2012	Rhythmic contemporary radio	Universal Records
