= Brian Soko =

- Born: 1991 (age 33–34); Chiredzi, Zimbabwe
- Occupations: Record producer; songwriter
- Years active: 2003–present
- Labels: Anashe Media Group
- Member of: The Order
- Website: briansoko.com

Brian Soko (born 1991) is a Zimbabwean songwriter and record producer who is based in the United States. He won three awards at the 2014 edition of the Broadcast Music Inc (BMI) R&B/Hip-Hop Awards for composing Beyoncé's song, "Drunk in Love", in 2014 and a Grammy Award for his production work on the same song.

== Background ==
Soko was born in 1991 in Zimbabwe in the small town of Chiredzi before moving with his parents to South Africa where they stayed for a short while. They moved to Manchester, New Hampshire, in the United States, where he briefly played football before deciding to study sound engineering. He has two brothers named Prince Soko and Arnold Soko.

== Career ==
Soko started as a rapper and used to sell his beats online. He switched to make beats for others while he was still in high school. During his first year at Tampa in Florida, he met Dre Moon and Rasool Diaz, who were also interested in music production. From then on, they focused on making rhythm and blues and hip hop beats. Soko's first break with his friends, who became partners, was in 2012 after the release of Lil Wayne's "No Worries".

Soko, together with his partners (The Order), composed and produced Beyonce's "Drunk in Love" in 2013. He also worked on the first compilation album of the group, Rich Gang and wrote and produced "100 Favors" which features Kendrick Lamar, Birdman and Detail. Soko's vocals were featured for the first time on a track titled "E.F.T." which stands for electronic funds transfer, released by a Pretoria-based rapper Chad, formerly known as Chad Da Don. He also worked with South African hip hop artists such as Cassper Nyovest on his song, "Phumakim", K.O's "Mission Statement" and MaE. He has also worked with Tinashe.

In 2014, Soko launched a media management, marketing and production company, Anashe Media Group, focused on the African music sector with the help of his brothers, Arnold Soko who is a video director and Prince Soko. Anashe Media Group has opened branches in Nigeria with the help of Oladipo Tandoh, Angola, Congo and South Africa. The group has produced videos for Suki Yaki.

== Production discography ==
- "E.F.T" by Chad (Formerly Known As Chad Da Don)
- "Phumakim" by Cassper Nyovest
- "Drunk in Love" by Beyoncé featuring Jay-Z
- "Mission Statement" by K.O
- "No Worries" by Lil Wayne
- "Sgelekeqe" by DJ Vigilante
- "Lie 2 me" by Ma-e
- "Pretend" by Tinashe
- "100 Favours" featuring Kendrick Lamar, Detail and Birdman
- "True Colors" by Wiz Khalifa
- "Maybe" by Teyana Taylor
- "Tap Out" by Rich Gang

== Awards ==
=== Billboard Music Awards ===
Soko has received two Billboard Music Award nominations.

Year	Nominee / work	Award	Result
2014	Drunk In Love	Top R'n'B/Hip-Hop Song	Won

=== Grammy Award ===
Year	Nominee / work	Award	Result
2015	"Beyoncé's Drunk In Love"		
2015	"Beyoncé's Drunk In Love"	Best R'n'B Song	Won

- Most Performed Song 2014 R&B/Hip-Hop Award Song for Lil Wayne's "No Worries"
- Billboard No 1 Hot R&B/Hip-Hop Song for Beyoncé's "Drunk In Love"
- Billboard No 1 Hot R&B/Hip-Hop Airplay for Beyoncé's "Drunk In Love"
