= Detail (music producer) =

American record producer

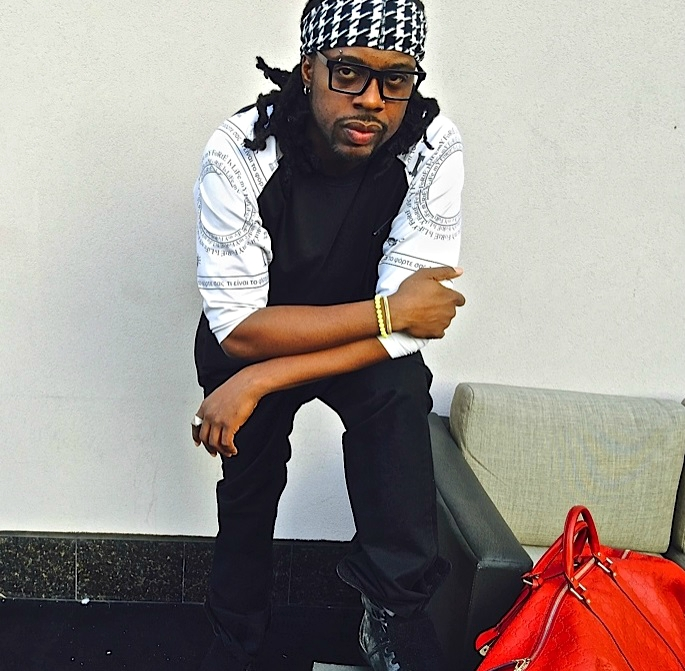

Background information
- Born: Noel Christopher Fisher; October 9, 1978 (age 48)
- Origin: Detroit, Michigan, United States
- Genres: Hip hop; R&B
- Occupations: Record producer; singer; songwriter; rapper
- Instruments: Vocals; digital audio workstation
- Years active: 2005–present
- Labels: Young Money; Cash Money; Republic; Dream City Music

Noel Christopher Fisher (born October 9, 1978), professionally known as Detail, is an American record producer, singer, songwriter and rapper. Hailing from Detroit, Michigan, Detail is best known for producing several hit singles, including "Sexy Can I" by Ray J, "I'm So Paid" by Akon, "How to Love" by Lil Wayne, "Drunk in Love" and "711" by Beyoncé, and "We Dem Boyz" by Wiz Khalifa. He released his debut studio album, Noel in December 2015.

== Life and career ==
In late 2005, he began to gain recognition in the music industry as a producer, after teaming up with American R&B singer Ray J to produce the bulk of his third album Raydiation. Since then he continued to produce tracks for Ray J, and expanded his catalog by working with other prominent artists such as Akon, the Pussycat Dolls, Lil Wayne, Beyoncé, Ashanti, Marques Houston, Lady Gaga, Brandy, Shorty Mack, Christina Aguilera, T-Pain, Jennifer Lopez, R. Kelly, Bone Thugs-n-Harmony, and Snoop Dogg.

Detail co-wrote and produced Lil Wayne's hit single "How to Love", for Wayne's 2011 album Tha Carter IV. The single was certified 4× Platinum by the Recording Industry Association of America (RIAA) and Detail subsequently signed to Wayne's Young Money Entertainment, as well as Cash Money Records, as a producer. Recently, he has produced the singles "Drunk In Love" for Beyoncé, "We Dem Boyz" for Wiz Khalifa and "I Luh Ya Papi" for Jennifer Lopez.

Detail received his first Grammy, when "Drunk In Love", performed by Beyoncé and Jay-Z, won Best R&B Song during the 57th Annual Grammy Awards.

In June 2016, Detail sued Drake for allegedly having his bodyguard assault him. His jaw was broken. Anthony Katz, a PR rep for Detail stated the producer’s insurance company is planning on taking legal action. The producer planned to release an official statement. The statement was never released.

== Sexual assault cases ==
In May 2018, two women named Kristina Buch and Peyton Ackley filed legal documents against Detail. Their allegations against him include multiple instances of mental and physical abuse and rape. The two women have since been granted restraining orders against him. The singer Jessie Reyez also revealed that her song "Gatekeeper" is about him.

Several other women have since joined Buch, Ackley, and Reyez in coming forward with similar allegations, including Bebe Rexha and Tinashe.

He was arrested on August 5, 2020, by the Los Angeles County Sheriff's Department and charged with raping five women and sexually assaulting another.

Currently, he is being held on bail of $6.3 million. Detail was arrested for incidents that took place between 2010 and 2018. Earlier, in 2011 he was accused of sexual assault and accused of holding a woman against her will and sexually assaulting her following a pre-Grammy party at his home in Canyon Country, California.

According to the source, the woman was a catering assistant and was hired to provide food for the party. TMZ reported that she said that after rebuffing Fisher's advances, he ripped off her clothes, locked her into a room and then raped her. She also stated that after she was able to escape Fisher, she told police and submitted to a rape kit.

Later, in 2018 another woman named Kristina Buch filed a lawsuit against Fisher alleging sexual assault. Buch, a model and aspiring singer, alleged that he raped her in Miami during a recording session and forced her to have sex in front of others. Furthermore, Peyton Ackley accused the music producer of forcing her to have sex with him in front of someone else and forcing her to record him having sex with Kristina. According to the Associated Press, Buch won her $15 million lawsuits in a default judgment because Fisher and his attorney did not respond to court summons or file any documents.

As of January 2025, Fisher remains in custody and stands charged with 26 counts of sexual assault related to claims from 11 different women. He has pleaded not guilty to 13 counts of rape, four counts of sodomy, four counts of oral copulation by force, three counts of assault, and one count each of rape and battery.

== Discography ==
=== Studio albums ===
List of albums, with selected chart positions
Title	Album details	Peak chart positions			Certifications
Title	Album details	US	US R&B	US Rap	Certifications
Noel	Released: December 11, 2015; Label: Dream City Music; Format: CD, digital download	—	—	—	
"—" denotes a recording that did not chart or was not released in that territory.

=== Compilation albums ===
List of albums, with selected chart positions
Title	Album details	Peak chart positions			Certifications
Title	Album details	US	US R&B	US Rap	Certifications
Rich Gang (with YMCMB)	Released: July 23, 2013; Label: Young Money, Cash Money, Republic; Format: CD, digital download	9	2	2	
"—" denotes a recording that did not chart or was not released in that territory.

=== Singles ===
==== As lead artist ====
List of songs, with selected chart positions, showing year released and album name
Title	Year	Peak chart positions			Album
Title	Year	US	US R&B	US Rap	Album
"Tattoo Girl (Foreva)" (featuring T-Pain, Lil Wayne and Travie McCoy)	2010	—	—	—	non-album singles
"SMH (Shakin' My Head)" (featuring Flo Rida)	2010	—	—	—	non-album singles
"—" denotes a recording that did not chart or was not released in that territory.

==== As featured artist ====
List of songs, with selected chart positions, showing year released and album name
Title	Year	Peak chart positions			Album
Title	Year	US	US R&B	US Rap	Album
"Endz" (O'Mega Red featuring Detail)	2010	—	—	—	The Redtape Vol.3
"I'm a Problem" (O'Mega Red featuring Detail)	2012	—	—	—	non-album singles
"Endz (Remix)" (O'Mega Red featuring Detail)	2012	—	—	—	non-album singles
"No Worries" (Lil Wayne featuring Detail)	2012	29	7	7	I Am Not a Human Being II
"All Night" (Tyhiem featuring Detail)	2015	—	—	—	
"—" denotes a recording that did not chart or was not released in that territory.

=== Guest appearances ===
List of non-single guest appearances, with other performing artists, showing year released and album name
Title	Year	Other artist(s)	Album
"Unbelievable"	2005	Ray J, Shorty Mack, Gangsta Girl	Raydiation
"Living Better Now"	2011	Game	Purp & Patron
"Bottlez"	2011	T-Pain	Revolver
"Nuthin'"	2011	T-Pain, E-40	Revolver
"305 to My City"	2013	Drake	Nothing Was the Same
"What a Year"	2015	Big Sean, Pharrell)	—N/a
"2 Minute Warning"	2016	Twenty88, K-Ci & JoJo	Twenty88

== Production discography ==
=== Singles produced ===
List of singles produced, with selected chart positions and certifications, showing year released and album name
Title	Year	Peak chart positions										Certifications	Album
Title	Year	US	US R&B	US Rap	AUS	CAN	GER	IRE	NZ	SWI	UK	Certifications	Album
"Sexy Can I" (Ray J and Yung Berg)	2007	3	4	—	—	—	—	—	10	—	66	RIAA: Platinum	All I Feel and Look What You Made Me
"Gifts" (Ray J)	2008	—	65	—	—	—	—	—	—	—	—		All I Feel
"I'm So Paid" (Akon featuring Lil Wayne and Young Jeezy)	2008	31	47	—	15	—	—	—	—	—	59	RIAA: Platinum	Freedom
"Endz" (O'Mega Red featuring Detail)	2010	—	—	—	—	—	—	—	—	—	—		The Redtape Vol.3
"Tattoo Girl (Foreva)" (Detail featuring T-Pain, Lil Wayne and Travie McCoy)	2010	—	—	—	—	—	—	—	—	—	—		non-album singles
"SMH (Shakin' My Head)" (Detail featuring Flo Rida)	2010	—	—	—	—	—	—	—	—	—	—		non-album singles
"How to Love" (Lil Wayne)	2011	5	2	2	58	20	97	—	24	67	48	RIAA: 4× Platinum	Tha Carter IV
"Sweat" (Bow Wow featuring Lil Wayne)	2011	48	104	—	—	—	—	—	—	—	—		non-album singles
"I'm a Problem" (O'Mega Red featuring Detail)	2012	—	—	—	—	—	—	—	—	—	—		non-album singles
"Ice" (Kelly Rowland featuring Lil Wayne)	2012	88	24	—	—	—	—	—	—	—	—		non-album singles
"Show You" (Tyga featuring Future)	2013	—	56	—	—	—	—	—	—	—	—		Hotel California
"No Worries" (Lil Wayne featuring Detail)	2013	29	7	7	—	—	—	—	—	—	—		I Am Not a Human Being II
"Tapout" (Rich Gang featuring Lil Wayne, Birdman, Mack Maine, Nicki Minaj and Future)	2013	44	10	8	—	—	134	—	—	—	—		Rich Gang
"Ready" (B.o.B featuring Future)	2013	105	37	—	—	—	—	—	—	—	—		Underground Luxury
"Drunk in Love" (Beyoncé featuring Jay-Z)	2013	2	1	—	22	23	70	10	7	40	9	ARIA: Gold; RMNZ: Gold	Beyoncé
"We Dem Boyz" (Wiz Khalifa)	2014	43	10	4	—	—	—	—	—	—	—		Blacc Hollywood
"Lookin Ass" (Nicki Minaj)	2014	104	28	16	—	—	—	—	—	—	—		Young Money: Rise of an Empire
"I Luh Ya Papi" (Jennifer Lopez featuring French Montana)	2014	77	—	—	—	78	—	—	—	—	170		A.K.A.
"Pretend" (Tinashe featuring ASAP Rocky)	2014	117	34	—	—	—	—	—	—	—	—		Aquarius
"Selfish" (Future featuring Rihanna)	2017	37	13	—	37	28	—	78	17	51	25	ARIA: Gold; MC: Gold; RMNZ: Gold; RIAA: Gold	Hndrxx
"Make Love" (Gucci Mane and Nicki Minaj)	2017	78	33	22	—	—	—	—	—	—	—		Mr. Davis
"Changed It" (Nicki Minaj and Lil Wayne)	2017	71	29	18	—	—	116	—	—	—	—		non-album single
"No Pressure" (French Montana featuring Future)	2017	—	—	—	—	—	—	—	—	—	—		Jungle Rules
"—" denotes a recording that did not chart or was not released in that territory.

== Awards and nominations ==
=== Grammy Awards ===
The Grammy Award are presented annually by the National Academy of Recording Arts and Sciences of the United States for outstanding achievements in the music industry. The awards were established in 1958. Detail received his first Grammy, when "Drunk in Love" performed by Beyoncé & Jay-Z won best R&B song during the 57th Annual Grammy Awards.

Year	Nominee / work	Award	Result
2015	"We Dem Boyz"	Best Rap Song	Nominated
2015	"Drunk in Love"	Best R&B Song	Won
2015	Beyoncé (as producer)	Album of the Year	Nominated

== See also ==
- MeToo movement
