= Jody Rosen =

American journalist and author

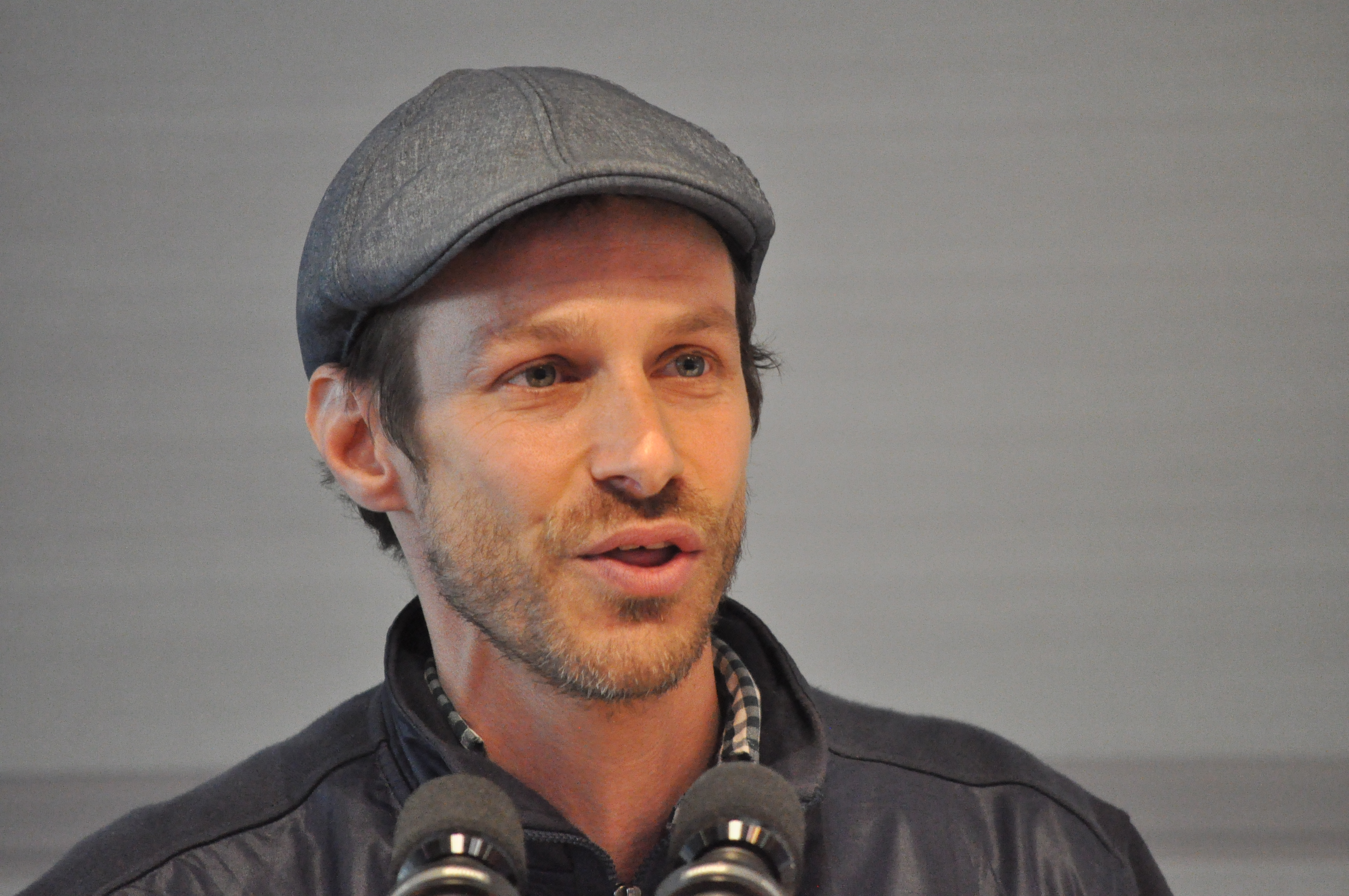
- Rosen in 2012
- Born: June 21, 1969 (age 57); New York City, U.S.
- Occupations: Journalist; author

Jody Rosen (born June 21, 1969 in New York City) is an American journalist and author. He is a contributing writer for The New York Times Magazine.

== Career ==
=== Journalism ===
Rosen served as critic-at-large for T: The New York Times Style Magazine, pop music critic for New York, music critic for Slate, before joining the Times magazine. He has also written for such publications as The New Yorker and Rolling Stone. His articles include a 2019 investigative exposé of the 2008 Universal Studios fire for The New York Times Magazine.

=== Books ===
Rosen is the author of White Christmas: The Story of an American Song and Two Wheels Good: The History And Mystery Of The Bicycle.

== Bibliography ==
- 2022 - Two Wheels Good: The History And Mystery Of The Bicycle; ISBN 978-0-804-14149-9
- 2007 - White Christmas: The Story of an American Song; ISBN 978-0-743-21876-4
