= Bhanned in the USA Tour =

2018–19 concert tour by Bhad Bhabie

- Tour by Bhad Bhabie
- Associated album: 15
- Start date: April 14, 2018
- End date: July 8, 2019
- Legs: 6
- No. of shows: 47 in North America; 6 in Oceania; 10 in Europe; 1 in Asia; 64 in total

The Bhanned in the USA Tour was the first concert tour by American rapper and Internet personality Bhad Bhabie. The tour began on April 14, 2018, in Santa Ana, California and concluded on July 8, 2019, in Amman, Jordan. The tour has promoted Bhabie’s music beginnings, her first singles and songs from her debut mixtape 15, and would often perform unreleased singles from the mixtape in the first legs in her tour, and towards the conclusion of the tour, she would perform singles that were later released in 2019 that were anticipated to be off her debut album.

== Background ==
On September 14, 2016, Bhabie and her mother, Barbara Ann Bregoli, appeared on the Dr. Phil show for the segment "I Want To Give Up My Car-Stealing, Knife-Wielding, Twerking 13-Year-Old Daughter Who Tried To Frame Me For A Crime" to discuss Bhabie's behavior. When Bhabie became aggravated at the laughter that the audience exhibited at her expense of stealing a crew member’s car on set, she responded to them by saying "Catch me outside, how about that?", jokingly challenging them to a fight outside the studio. Her accent made the phrase sound like "Cash me ousside how bout dah" which became a meme and Bhabie became known as the "'Cash Me Outside' Girl". After the clip was remixed by DJ Suede The Remix God into a song, ("Cash Me Outside") entered the Billboard Hot 100, Streaming Songs, and Hot R&B/Hip-Hop Songs charts in its March 4, 2017, issue. The song later turn led to a series of dance videos that were uploaded onto YouTube.

Later that year, she was nominated for the 2017 MTV Movie & TV Awards in the "Trending" category based on the catchphrase.

In early 2017, Bhabie was signed by music manager Adam Kluger and had begun to record music. Her first single "These Heaux" has been released on August 24, 2017, along with the singles "Whachu Know" & "Hi Bich" the following month.

On March 7, 2018, she announced her first tour entitled "Bhanned in the USA Tour" with American rapper Asian Doll. Later on multiple occasions she had announced more legs and had many shows cancelled for multiple reasons throughout both 2018 & 2019.

== Shows ==
Date	City	Country	Venue	Opening acts
Leg 1 - North America
April 14, 2018	Santa Ana	United States	The Constellation Room	Asian Doll
April 27, 2018	San Antonio	United States	Rock Box	Asian Doll
April 28, 2018	Dallas	United States	Trees Dallas	Asian Doll
April 29, 2018	Houston	United States	Scout Bar	Asian Doll; Chris Sails; Pe$o Pe$o
May 4, 2018	Miami	United States	The Hanger	Asian Doll; Elly Elz
May 5, 2018	Orlando	United States	The Beacham	Asian Doll; Elly Elz
May 6, 2018	Atlanta	United States	Hell at the Masquerade	Asian Doll; Elly Elz
May 8, 2018	College Park	United States	Milkboy Arthouse	Asian Doll
May 9, 2018	New York City	United States	S.O.B.’s	Asian Doll
May 10, 2018	Philadelphia	United States	NOTO	Asian Doll
May 11, 2018	Cambridge	United States	The Middle East	Asian Doll; WHYTRI
May 12, 2018	New Haven	United States	Toad's Place	Asian Doll
May 14, 2018	Toronto	Canada	The Mod Club	Asian Doll
May 15, 2018	Chicago	United States	Bottom Lounge	Asian Doll
May 16, 2018	Detroit	United States	Saint Andrew's Hall	Asian Doll
May 18, 2018	Indianapolis	United States	The Emerson Theater	Asian Doll
May 19, 2018	Minneapolis	United States	Cabooze Plaza	Asian Doll
May 22, 2018	Denver	United States	Cervante’s Other Side	Asian Doll; KingTae
May 25, 2018	Mesa	United States	Club Red	Asian Doll
May 26, 2018	San Diego	United States	Soma	Asian Doll
May 29, 2018	San Francisco	United States	Slim's	Asian Doll
May 30, 2018	Sacramento	United States	Harlow’s	Asian Doll
June 1, 2018	Portland	United States	Roseland Theater	Asian Doll
June 2, 2018	Spokane	United States	Knitting Factory Concert House	Asian Doll
June 3, 2018	Seattle	United States	Neumo's	Asian Doll
June 5, 2018	Vancouver	Canada	Venue - Vancouver	Asian Doll
June 14, 2018	West Hollywood	United States	Roxy Theatre	Asian Doll Pia Mia
Leg 2 - Europe
July 6, 2018	Barcelona	Spain	Sala Razzmatazz	BRYN; Ski Mask The Slump God
July 7, 2018	Gräfenhainichen	Germany	Splash! Festival	BRYN; Ski Mask The Slump God
July 8, 2018	Liège	Belgium	Les Ardentes	BRYN; Ski Mask The Slump God
July 9, 2018	Paris	France	La Maroquinerle	BRYN; Ski Mask The Slump God
July 11, 2018	London	England	O2 Academy Islington	BRYN; Asian Doll; Ski Mask The Slump Glod
July 12, 2018	Amsterdam	The Netherlands	Melkweg Oude Zaal	BRYN; Ski Mask The Slump God
July 13, 2018	Copenhagen	Denmark	Hafnia Zoo	BRYN; Ski Mask The Slump God
August 25, 2018	Birmingham	England	O2 Academy Birmingham	BRYN; Ski Mask The Slump God
Leg 3 - North America
September 1, 2018	Seattle	United States	Seattle Center	N/A
September 19, 2018	Los Angeles	United States	1720	N/A
November 16, 2018	San Luis Obispo	United States	The Fremont Theatre	N/A
November 17, 2018	Chico	United States	Senator Theatre	N/A
November 18, 2018	Santa Barbara	United States	Velvet Jones	N/A
November 20, 2018	Garden City	United States	Revolution Concert House + Event Center	N/A
November 30, 2018	Fresno	United States	Azteca Theater	N/A
December 1, 2018	Reno	United States	Jub Jub's	N/A
December 2, 2018	Sacramento	United States	Harlow's	N/A
Leg 4 - Oceania
December 7, 2018	Perth	Australia	Astor Theatre, Perth	Ketana
December 8, 2018	Eatons Hill	Australia	Grand Ballroom, Eatons Hill Hotel & Function Centre	Mollie Rose
December 9, 2018	Newtown	Australia	Enmore Theatre	BUSY
December 12, 2018	Melbourne	Australia	170 Russell	YO! MAFIA
December 13, 2018	Adelaide	Australia	HQ Complex	Morgen Wynn
December 15, 2018	Auckland	New Zealand	The Studio	N/A
Leg 5 - North America
February 8, 2019	San Diego	United States	BssMnt	Kris the $pirit
February 23, 2019	Montreal	Canada	Théâtre Corona	Kris the $pirit
February 24, 2019	Toronto	Canada	Phoenix Concert Theatre	Kris the $pirit
February 25, 2019	Winnipeg	Canada	The Garrick	Kris the $pirit
February 28, 2019	Edmonton	Canada	Union Hall	Kris the $pirit
March 1, 2019	Calgary	Canada	MacEwan Hall Ballroom	Kris the $pirit
March 2, 2019	Vancouver	Canada	Venue - Vancouver	Kris the $pirit
May 4, 2019	Austin	United States	Circuit of the Americas	Kris the $pirit
May 9, 2019	Edmonton	Canada	Union Hall	Kris the $pirit
May 10, 2019	Vancouver	Canada	Venue - Vancouver	Kris the $pirit
May 11, 2019	Calgary	Canada	MacEwan Hall Ballroom	Kris the $pirit
Leg 6 - Europe & Asia
July 3, 2019	Berlin	Germany	Bi Nuu	N/A
July 4, 2019	Frankfurt	Germany	Zoom	N/A
July 8, 2019	Amman	Jordan	Opera House	N/A

Notes:

1. Legs 2 and 6 were known as the Bhanned In Europe Tour.
2. The London and Birmingham shows in leg 2 however were known as the Bhanned In The UK Tour.
3. Leg 4 was known as the Bhanned In Australia Tour.
