= Unfuckwitable =

Unfuckwitable or Unfuckwittable may refer to:

== Albums and EPs ==
- Unfuckwitable, a 2017 mixtape by Ann Marie
- Unfuccwitable, a 2019 mixtape by Asian Doll
- Unfuckwitable, a 2021 EP by Babyface Ray

== Songs ==
- "Unfuckwitable", a song by DJ Desue, Curse and Sauce Money from the 2002 album The Art of War
- "Unfuckwitable", a song by Fabolous from his 2011 mixtape There Is No Competition 3: Death Comes in 3's
- "Unfuckwitable", a song by Smoke DZA from his 2016 mixtape George Kush da Button (Don't Pass Trump the Blunt)
- "Unfuckwitable", a song by Psalm One and Optiks from their 2020 EP Before They Stop Us
- "Unfuckwitable", a song by Zayn from his 2021 album Nobody Is Listening
- "Unfuckwittable", a song by Jamal from his 1995 album Last Chance, No Breaks
- "Unfuckwittable", a song by Kid Cudi from his 2013 album Indicud
- "Unfuckwitable", a song by Rylo Rodriguez from his 2023 album Been One
- "UnFuckWitAble", a song by Cassidy from his 2020 album Da Science
- "Unfuckwitable", a song by DJ Paul and Lord Infamous from the 2016 album YOTS: Year of the Six Pt. 2
- "Unfuckwittable", a song by Stunna Girl from her 2021 mixtape STUNNA THIS STUNNA THAT
