= List of Snapchat original programming =

Beginning in 2016, Snapchat began to produce its own original content called Snap Originals.

== Original programming ==
=== Comedy ===
Title	Genre	Premiere	Seasons	Status
Co-Ed	College, Coming of age	October 10, 2018	1 season, 8 episodes	Ended
Kappa Crypto	Comedy	December 15, 2018	1 season, 8 episodes	Ended
#Vanlife	Comedy	February 1, 2019	1 season, 8 episodes	Ended
Commanders	Comedy	September 1, 2019	1 season, 10 episodes	Ended
Denton's Death Date	Comedy	September 28, 2019	1 season, 10 episodes	Ended
Get Money	Comedy	March 20, 2020	1 season, 8 episodes	Ended
Death Hacks	Animation	August 29, 2020	1 season, 8 episodes	Ended
Everything's Fine	Comedy, bipolar disorder	May 22, 2021	1 season, 10 episodes	Ended
Total Badass Wrestling	Wrestling	July 17, 2021	1 season, 10 episodes	Ended
The Me and You Show	Sketch comedy	October 1, 2021	2 seasons	Ended

=== Drama ===
Title	Genre	Premiere	Seasons	Status
Class of Lies	Thriller	October 10, 2018	1 season, 12 episodes	Ended
V/H/S	Horror, Anthology	October 28, 2018	1 season, 4 episodes	Ended
Two Sides	Romance	June 29, 2019	3 seasons, 36 episodes	Pending
Dead of Night	Thriller	September 14, 2019	2 seasons, 20 episodes	Pending
The Dead Girls Detective Agency	Mystery	December 14, 2019	4 seasons, 40 episodes	Canceled
Players	Basketball	January 11, 2020	1 season, 8 episodes	Ended
Save Me	Thriller	February 1, 2020	1 season, 10 episodes	Ended
Action Royale	Action	October 9, 2021	1 season, 10 episodes	Pending
Breakwater	Young adult, sci-fi	February 12, 2022	1 season, 12 episodes	Ongoing

=== Unscripted ===
==== Docuseries ====
Title	Genre/topic	Premiere	Seasons	Status
Good Luck America	Politics	January 28, 2016	41 seasons	Indefinite hiatus
Vivian	Modelling	October 22, 2018	1 season, 8 episodes	Ended
Deep Creek	Reality	November 11, 2018	2 seasons, 10 episodes	Ended
Growing Up Is a Drag	Drag	December 17, 2018	1 season, 8 episodes	Ended
Bringing Up Bhabie	Internet celebrity	February 4, 2019	1 season, 12 episodes	Ended
Stranded	Ghost hunting	October 26, 2019	1 season, 8 episodes	Ended
VS The World	Popular culture	December 21, 2019	3 seasons, 24 episodes	Pending
Mind Yourself	Mental health	February 15, 2020	1 season, 10 episodes	Ended
Driven	Mental health	February 29, 2020	2 seasons, 19 episodes	Pending
Endless	Romance	February 29, 2020	4 seasons, 46 episodes	Pending
Nikita Unfiltered	Beauty, Trans culture	February 29, 2020	2 seasons, 20 episodes	Pending
The Honeybeez of ASU	Dance squad	April 25, 2020	1 season, 10 episodes	Ended
Road Trippin'	Travel documentary, comedy	July 18, 2020	1 season, 10 episodes	Ended
Queen of Stylez	Hairstyling, Trans culture	November 21, 2020	1 season, 8 episodes	Ended
Life by the Horns	Bull riding	February 20, 2021	1 season, 10 episodes	Ended
Swae Meets World	Music, fashion	April 17, 2021	1 season, 10 episodes	Ended
Twinning Out	Internet celebrity	May 15, 2021	1 season, 10 episodes	Ended
As I Am	Asian Americans	May 18, 2021	1 season, 6 episodes	Ended
Life's a Tripp	Social issues	June 4, 2021	1 season, 8 episodes	Ended
Lago Vista	High school	July 5, 2021	1 season, 30 episodes	Pending
Honestly Loren	Internet celebrity	August 7, 2021	1 season, 10 episodes	Pending
Meme Mom	Internet celebrity	September 18, 2021	1 season, 10 episodes	Pending
Addison Rae Goes Home	Internet celebrity	March 12, 2022	1 season, 10 episodes	Pending
Level Up with Steph Curry	Basketball	June 25, 2022	1 season, 6 episodes	Ongoing
Awaiting release
Run for Office	Politics	2022		

==== Reality ====
Title	Genre/topic	Premiere	Seasons	Status
Free Tuition with MK Asante	Social issues	August 8, 2020	1 seasons, 15 episodes	Pending
While Black with MK Asante	Racism against Black Americans	November 4, 2019	2 seasons, 18 episodes	Pending
Will from Home	Reality	April 3, 2020	2 seasons, 23 episodes	Ended
The Solution Committee	Social issues	September 21, 2020	1 season, 8 episodes	Ended
Coach Kev	Life coaching	October 10, 2020	1 season, 10 episodes	Ended
First Person	Climate movement	November 18, 2020	1 season, 12 episodes	Ended
Move It	Dance	December 16, 2020	1 season, 10 episodes	Ended
Fake Up	Make-up art optical illusions	December 26, 2020	2 seasons, 8 episodes	Pending
Ryan Doesn't Know	Self-help	January 30, 2021	1 season, 12 episodes	Ended
Phone Swap India	Dating game show	March 27, 2021	1 season, 12 episodes	Pending
Coming Out	Coming out	July 25, 2021	1 season, 6 episodes	Pending
Charlie Vs Dixie	Competition	November 13, 2021	1 season, 10 episodes	Renewed
Off Thee Leash with Megan Thee Stallion	Interview	February 19, 2022	1 season, 8 episodes	Pending
Awaiting release
Daring Simone Biles		Late 2022	1 season, 10 episodes	
La'Ron in a Million	Celebrity	2022		
Reclaim(ed)	Traditions, social issues	2022		

=== Continuations ===
These shows have been picked up by Snapchat for additional seasons after having aired previous seasons on another network.

Title	Genre	Prev. network(s)	Premiere	Seasons	Status
MTV Cribs	Docuseries	MTV	June 3, 2017	3 seasons, 21 episodes	Ended
Girl Code	Comedy	MTV	July 27, 2017	2 seasons, 24 episodes	Ended
Promposal	Docuseries	MTV	May 28, 2018	1 season, 4 episodes	Ended
