= 15 (mixtape) =

2018 mixtape by Bhad Bhabie

Mixtape by Bhad Bhabie
- Released: September 18, 2018
- Genres: Hip-hop; trap
- Length: 39:20
- Label: Atlantic
- Producers: 30 Roc; Bobby Kritical; Cheeze Beatz; DJ Chose; Eric Choice; Foreign Teck; Jack Shirak; Jo L’Z; P-Crisco; Pliznaya; Price; Ronny J; Taz Taylor; The Rascals; Win Crabtree

Singles from 15
- 1. "Hi Bich" Released: September 22, 2017; 2. "Gucci Flip Flops" Released: March 26, 2018; 3. "Trust Me" Released: June 14, 2018; 4. "Yung and Bhad" Released: August 30, 2018; 5. "Geek'd" Released: September 20, 2018

15 is the debut mixtape by American rapper Bhad Bhabie. It was released on September 18, 2018, by Atlantic Records. It features guest appearances from Lil Baby, Lil Yachty, Asian Doll, YG, City Girls and Ty Dolla Sign.

== Background ==
Bhad Bhabie was first discovered on the Dr. Phil show, where she said the phrase "cash me outside, how 'bout dah?" This later became a meme which went viral, turning her into an Internet star. She gained a following on Instagram and YouTube, and on August 23, 2017, TMZ leaked what would be her first song to chart on the Billboard Hot 100, "These Heaux". She became the second youngest female artist in music history to enter the Hot 100 with her debut single, debuting and peaking at 77, and a few days later, she was signed to Atlantic Records.

She later released "Hi Bich", which also charted on the Hot 100 at number 68, the highest new entry for that week. It was later certified Platinum by the RIAA. She released more singles over the course of eight months. On March 26, 2018, Bhabie released "Gucci Flip Flops", which reached a peak of 79 on the Hot 100, making her the youngest female to have three songs enter the Hot 100 since LeAnn Rimes. The single went on to be certified Platinum in the US, making it her first single to achieve Platinum status.

On April 14, 2018, she began her international tour Bhanned in the US with opener Asian Doll, where she previewed many songs like "Affiliated".

After she was nominated at the 2018 Billboard Music Awards for Top Rap Female Artist, she announced she would be releasing a single called "Trust Me" featuring Ty Dolla Sign, as well as a mixtape. She released the single a few weeks later, and while it failed to chart on the Hot 100, it peaked at number nine on the Bubbling Under R&B/Hip-Hop Singles chart. On August 14, 2018, she announced the release date for the mixtape, and released the first promotional single for the mixtape, "15 (Intro)". The fourth single featuring City Girls, “Yung and Bhad” was released on August 30.

The following month, she released the artwork for the mixtape, and a few days later she revealed the track list, announcing guest appearances from many rappers such as YG and Lil Baby. One day later she previewed the track "Thot Opps (Clout Drop)" on her social media, and the next day she released "Thot Opps (Clout Drop)" and "Bout That".

She released the music video for her collaboration with Lil Baby, "Geek'd", the mixtape's fifth and final single, on September 20.

== Critical reception ==
Professional ratings
Review scores
Source	Rating
AllMusic	3/5 stars
Pitchfork	5.5/10
The New York Times	Mixed

15 received mixed reviews. Writing for Pitchfork and rating the album a 5.5 out of 10, Michelle Kim stated that "Danielle Bregoli's leap from meme to rapper continues with her debut mixtape that leans heavily on mimicry and trails dreadfully behind the current sound of hip-hop. On 15, her first mixtape as Bhad Bhabie, Bregoli doesn't show much versatility past her well-established tough-girl character. She's successful in imitating the sound of today's rap hits; most of the songs on 15 come across like they're specifically engineered to be placed onto Spotify's 'RapCaviar' playlist."

AllMusic's Neil Yeung rated the mixtape a three out of five, stating that "for what it's worth, buried beneath the posturing and obnoxiousness lies a glimmer of promise. However, Bhad Bhabie requires some polishing and maturity if she's ever going to grow beyond a mere novelty."

For The New York Times, Jon Caramanica gave the album a mixed review and states that "On the entertaining if erratic 15, Bhad Bhabie raps like someone who is learning to rap in real time, which to be fair, she is. Her default mode is taunt, and she's effective at it [...] At its best, 15 is appealing both as straight-ahead hip-hop and also novelty — a rap album made by a rap fan given all the resources of an actual rapper."

== Track listing ==
Credits adapted from BMI and Tidal.

No.	Title	Writer(s)	Producer(s)	Length
1.	"15 (Intro)"	Danielle Bregoli; Leon Flowers; Alan Spencer	Pliznaya	2:20
2.	"Juice" (featuring YG)	Bregoli; Keenon Jackson; Norman Payne; Brittany Barber; Jacquez Lowe	DJ Chose	2:38
3.	"Gucci Flip Flops" (featuring Lil Yachty)	Bregoli; Miles McCollum; Samuel Gloade; Darryl McCorkell; Lowe; Robert Watson, Jr.; Lamont Porter	30 Roc; Cheeze Beatz	2:31
4.	"Affiliated" (featuring Asian Doll)	Bregoli; Misharron Allen; Danny Snodgrass, Jr.; Joel Abraham; Henry Nichols; Barber	Taz Taylor; Jo L'Z; Pharaoh Vice	2:26
5.	"Geek'd" (featuring Lil Baby)	Bregoli; Dominique Jones; Leon Thomas III; Kristopher Riddick-Tynes; Barber; Jocelyn Donald; Omari Massenburg	The Rascals	2:13
6.	"No More Love"	Bregoli; Payne; Christopher Frank; Barber; James Lavigne	DJ Chose; P-Crisco	2:01
7.	"Thot Opps (Clout Drop)"	Bregoli; Flowers; Barber	Pliznaya	1:44
8.	"Yung and Bhad" (featuring City Girls)	Bregoli; Caresha Brownlee; Jatavia Johnson; Flowers; Lowe	Pliznaya	2:50
9.	"Count It" (with Shirak)	Bregoli; Jack Shirak	Shirak	2:11
10.	"Famous"	Bregoli; Michael Hernandez; Win Crabtree; Barber; Spencer	Foreign Teck; Crabtree	2:47
11.	"Hi Bich"	Bregoli; Ronald Spence, Jr.; Nicholaus Williams; Lavigne	Ronny J	1:45
12.	"Shhh"	Bregoli; Flowers; Crabtree; Barber; Lavigne	Pliznaya; Crabtree	2:03
13.	"Trust Me" (featuring Ty Dolla Sign)	Bregoli; Tyrone Griffin, Jr.; Bobby Turner, Jr.; Barber; Kristopher Campbell	Bobby Kritical	3:13
14.	"Bout That"	Bregoli; Flowers; Crabtree; Barber; Lavigne	Pliznaya; Crabtree	1:59
15.	"Bhad Bhabie Story (Outro)"	Bregoli; Larry Jacks, Jr.; Eric Choice	Price; Choice	6:38
Total length:				39:20

== Credits and personnel ==
Credits adapted from Tidal.

=== Production ===
- Pliznaya – production (tracks 1, 7–8, 12, and 14)
- DJ Chose – production (tracks 2 and 6)
- 30 Roc – production (track 3)
- Cheeze Beatz – production (track 3)
- Jo L'Z – production (track 4)
- Pharaoh Vice – production (track 4)
- Taz Taylor – production (track 4)
- The Rascals – production (track 5)
- P-Crisco – production (track 6)
- Jack Shirak – production (track 9)
- Foreign Teck – production (track 10)
- Ronny J – production (track 11)
- Bobby Kritical – production (track 13)
- Price – production (track 15)
- Eric Choice – production (track 15)
- Win Crabtree – production (tracks 10, 12, and 14)

=== Technical ===
- Thierry Chaunay – engineering (track 11)
