= Gucci Flip Flops =

2018 single by Bhad Bhabie featuring Lil Yachty

Single by Bhad Bhabie featuring Lil Yachty

from the album 15
- Released: March 26, 2018
- Genre: Hip-hop; trap
- Length: 2:58
- Label: Atlantic
- Songwriters: Danielle Bregoli; Miles McCollum; Samuel Gloade; Darryl McCorkell; Jacquez Lowe; Robert Watson, Jr.; Lamont Porter
- Producers: 30 Roc; Cheeze Beatz

Bhad Bhabie singles chronology
"Hi Bich (Remix)" (2018)	"Gucci Flip Flops" (2018)	"Trust Me" (2018)

Lil Yachty singles chronology
"No Regrets" (2018)	"Gucci Flip Flops" (2018)	"Do Not Disturb" (2018)

Music video
- "Gucci Flip Flops" on YouTube

"Gucci Flip Flops" is a song by American rapper Bhad Bhabie featuring fellow American rapper Lil Yachty, released on March 26, 2018 as the second single from the former's debut mixtape 15 (2018). The song was produced by 30 Roc and Cheeze Beatz.

== Composition ==
The song sees the rappers rapping about them living luxuriously, over a "bouncy" trap instrumental. Bhad Bhabie targets her haters in the first verse, while Lil Yachty raps the second verse.

== Music video ==
A music video directed by Nicholaus Goossen was released on May 1, 2018. Shot in black and white, it uses a 1950s theme as well as inspiration from the sitcom Leave It to Beaver and the film Pleasantville. It depicts Bhad Bhabie as the daughter of a family watching television in their home. Bhabie and Yachty appear on the TV screen in color, rapping the song. While the parents are disgusted, their son is interested in the performance. A milkman (played by David Spade) arrives to make a delivery, but is cursed at and dismissed by Bhabie. By the end of the video, the family becomes fans of Bhad Bhabie, with their appearances changed. As of December 2025 the video has almost 230 million views.

== Remix ==
The official remix features American rappers Plies and Snoop Dogg. It was released on October 2, 2018.

== Charts ==
Chart performance for "Gucci Flip Flops"
Chart (2018)	Peak position
Canada Hot 100 (Billboard)	62
US Billboard Hot 100	79
US Hot R&B/Hip-Hop Songs (Billboard)	39

== Certifications ==
Certifications for "Gucci Flip Flops"
Region	Certification	Certified units/sales
Canada (Music Canada)	Gold	40,000^{‡}
New Zealand (RMNZ)	Platinum	30,000^{‡}
Poland (ZPAV)	Gold	25,000^{‡}
United Kingdom (BPI)	Silver	200,000^{‡}
United States (RIAA)	Platinum	1,000,000^{‡}
^{‡} Sales+streaming figures based on certification alone.
