= Bacc At It Again =

2019 single by Yella Beezy featuring Quavo and Gucci Mane

Single by Yella Beezy featuring Quavo and Gucci Mane

from the album Baccend Beezy
- Released: March 15, 2019
- Genre: Trap
- Length: 3:48
- Label: Hitco
- Songwriters: Markies Deandre Conway; Radric Davis; Quavious Keyate Marshall; Chris Rosser; Unknown writer
- Producer: Quay Global

Yella Beezy singles chronology
"Got Damn" (2019)	"Bacc At It Again" (2019)	"Rich MF" (2019)

Quavo singles chronology
"Lamb Talk" (2018)	"Bacc At It Again" (2019)	"Too Much Shaft" (2019)

Gucci Mane singles chronology
"With You" (2019)	"Bacc At It Again" (2019)	"Pineapple" (2019)

"Bacc At It Again" is a song by American rapper Yella Beezy featuring fellow American rappers Quavo and Gucci Mane, released as a single on March 15, 2019. The music video was released on April 15, 2019. The song debuted at number 94 on the US Billboard Hot 100, becoming Yella Beezy's second song to chart on the Hot 100 after his 2018 song "That's On Me", which reached number 56.

== Background ==
The song marks Yella Beezy's first official single after he was shot and hospitalized in October 2018.

== Music video ==
The music video, directed by Benny Boom, was released on April 25, 2019. It features a "futuristic" theme and appearances from all three rappers. The video features a cameo from American comedian D.C. Young Fly.

== Charts ==
Chart (2019)	Peak position
US Billboard Hot 100	78
US Hot R&B/Hip-Hop Songs (Billboard)	33
US Rhythmic Airplay (Billboard)	19

== Certifications ==
Region	Certification	Certified units/sales
United States (RIAA)	Gold	500,000^{‡}
^{‡} Sales+streaming figures based on certification alone.
