= Bringing Up Bhabie =

American reality web series

- Genre: Web series
- Developed by: Sergio Alfaro; Michaline Babieh; Kristy Wampole
- Creative director: Deja
- Starring: Danielle Bregoli; Barbara Ann; Frank Dellatto
- Original language: English
- No. of seasons: 1
- No. of episodes: 12

Original release
- Network: Snapchat
- Release: February 4 – February 19, 2019

Bringing up Bhabie is a Snapchat reality web series produced by Sergio Alfaro, Michaline Babich and Kristy Wampole that has been available on Snapchat since February 4, 2019. The first season had concluded on February 19 that same year. The series stars Bhad Bhabie, her mother Barbara Ann and her bodyguard Frank Dellatto. It follows the then 15-year-old's life behind the scenes and behind the music.

== Production ==
The idea for a show was first reported in March 2018, where the idea was pitched to multiple different cable networks before settling with Snapchat's new TV format, Snap Originals. Filming for the first season began in October 2018 and finished in December the same year, although footage from concerts from as early as April 2018 is seen to be used. The show reportedly received over 10 million views in its first 24 hours of airing when it premiered on February 4, 2019.

During September 2019, the show was renewed for its second season, due to air in summer 2020. In January 2020, TMZ reported seeing Bhabie outside filming for the second season of the show. The show was set to air in February 2020, but was pushed back due to Bregoli's social media hiatus, causing filming to take a break.

== Cast ==
=== Main cast ===
- Danielle Bregoli
- Barbara Ann
- Frank Dellatto

=== Recurring cast ===
- Dan Roof
- Adam Kluger
- Brittany B.

=== Guest cast ===
- Andrew "Drew" Grant
- Cache
- Asia
- Deja

== Episodes ==
No.	Title	Original release date
1	"America's Bhaddest teen holds nothing back"	February 4, 2019
2	"Dani vs. Mom... this is just the beginning"	February 5, 2019
3	"Can you ever trust your friends?"	February 6, 2019
4	"Bhad Bhabie's biggest regret"	February 7, 2019
5	"This can't be real. Or is it?"	February 8, 2019
6	"Will Dani apologise?"	February 11, 2019
7	"How embarrassing!"	February 12, 2019
8	"No one wants to do this!"	February 13, 2019
9	"Liar!"	February 14, 2019
10	"The end of Frank?"	February 15, 2019
11	"What's it like to be famous..."	February 18, 2019
12	"Behind the F***ing Scenes: Behind Bhabie... try not to lol!"	February 19, 2019
