= Flula Makes Five =

Flula Makes Five is a scripted sitcom podcast starring Flula Borg. It launched September 19, 2023. A second season started October 22, 2024.

The show's premise is that a family of four unwittingly purchases a house where a German techno DJ (Borg) holds a 100-year lease to their basement and the bottom shelf of their refrigerator.

Cast also features John Lehr, musicians Henri Cash and Julie Edwards, and Russell Horning, inventor of the flossing dance.

Notable guest stars on the series have included Andy Richter, Lauren Lapkus, Seth Green, David DeLuise, and Alaska Thunderfuck.

Joey Lawrence, Matthew Lawrence and Andrew Lawrence joined the cast in season two.

The series was created by Borg and writers Alex Hinton and Andy Wombwell.
