= With You (Jay Sean song) =

Single by Jay Sean featuring Gucci Mane and Asian Doll
- Released: 8 March 2019
- Genre: R&B
- Length: 3:15
- Label: Republic
- Songwriter(s): Kamaljit Singh Jhooti; Radric Delantic Davis; Misharron Jamesha Allen

Jay Sean singles chronology
"Cherry Papers" (2018)	"With You" (2019)	"Surma Surma" (2020)

Gucci Mane singles chronology
"Shoebox" (2019)	"With You" (2019)	"Bacc At It Again" (2019)

Asian Doll singles chronology
"With You" (2019)

"With You" is a song by English singer Jay Sean, featuring American rappers Gucci Mane and Asian Doll, from Sean's upcoming fifth studio album. The song was released on 8 March 2019.

== Background ==
It is Sean's first release under the label Republic. Sean re-signed with Republic after he left Cash Money in 2014.

== Music video ==
A lyric video of the song was released on YouTube on 7 March 2019. A music video was released on 23 April 2019.

== Charts ==
Chart performance for "With You"
Chart (2020)	Peak position
New Zealand Hot Singles (RMNZ)	30
Romania (Airplay 100)	53

== Certifications ==
Certification for "With You"
Region	Certification	Certified units/sales
New Zealand (RMNZ)	Gold	15,000^{‡}
^{‡} Sales+streaming figures based on certification alone.
