= Ms. Whitman =

2025 single by Bhad Bhabie

Single by Bhad Bhabie
- Released: February 25, 2025
- Genre: Hardcore hip-hop
- Length: 2:06
- Label: B.H.A.D. Music; Hitmaker
- Songwriters: Danielle Bregoli; Loopy Ferrell
- Producer: Young Pepo

Bhad Bhabie singles chronology
"Over Cooked" (2025)	"Ms. Whitman" (2025)	"OG Crashout" (2025)

Music video
- "Ms. Whitman" on YouTube

"Ms. Whitman" is a song by American rapper Bhad Bhabie, released on February 25, 2025. It is a diss track aimed at rapper Alabama Barker, the daughter of musician Travis Barker and stepdaughter of Kourtney Kardashian. Produced by Young Pepo, the song contains a sample of "Carnival" by ¥$.

== Background ==
Bhad Bhabie's feud with Alabama Barker began in December 2024 when Bhabie accused Barker in a now-deleted Instagram Story of entering a relationship with rapper Le Vaughn, whom Bhabie had been dating since 2020 and had a child with in 2024. Bhabie also alleged that Barker made overtures to Vaughn while she was undergoing chemotherapy for blood cancer. Barker denied the accusations, claiming it was Vaughn who first approached her and that he had been reaching out to her for more than a year and was unaware they were in a relationship. After much arguing on social media, Barker and Bhabie respectively released the songs "Vogue" on December 13 and "Mommy Mode" on December 20. The tracks are widely believed to contain veiled disses toward each other. Bhabie followed up with the song "Over Cooked" on January 27, 2025 in which she directly dissed Barker, accusing her of having relationships with rappers Soulja Boy and Tyga and having an abortion after being impregnated by the latter. Barker and the rappers in question denied the claims. On February 11, 2025, Barker responded with her song "Cry Bhabie", a direct diss toward Bhabie. In the song, Barker reasserts that Vaughn was the one pursuing her and also accuses Bhabie of being on pills. Bhabie responded with "Ms. Whitman", after teasing it in the previous week. The title is a reference to the character Alabama Whitman from the film True Romance, who is a sex worker.

Hours after releasing the song, Bhad Bhabie teased a brief snippet of an apparent guest verse from Kanye West for a remix. Later that evening, West clarified that his voice from the preview was actually AI-generated. He stated he was not involved in the feud, nor did he want to be, and that he only cleared the sample because "so many people try to stop me. They stop clearances and everything. It's been very difficult for me, so if somebody asks me for something, I always clear it."

== Content ==
The song finds Bhad Bhabie taking aim at Kourtney Kardashian in the beginning, claiming she has no friends because she steals others' boyfriends, before stating that Alabama Barker relies on her parents' money for clout and "That stanky pussy got you kicked out the Kardashian house (Ahahaha, stanky)". Bhabie also accuses Barker of stealing rapper Latto's flow and having sex with producer ATL Jacob to obtain his beats. She threatens violence against Barker if she uses Le Vaughn's name again, referencing the Chris Rock–Will Smith slapping incident. Bhabie again alleges that Barker became pregnant from Tyga and had an abortion, before bragging about her own musical achievements with a diss making fun of Soulja Boy's teeth. In addition, she accuses Barker of having sexual relationships with many men, including NFL players and rapper Jackboy. Later on, Bhabie calls her a "tramp" and makes a reference to the Draco Pistol along with that of rapper Drake and his song "God's Plan".

== Music video ==
The music video premiered alongside the single. It features a scene that sees Bhad Bhabie twerking on and around a drummer resembling Travis Barker.

== Charts ==
Chart performance for "Ms. Whitman"
Chart (2025)	Peak position
Australia Hip Hop/R&B (ARIA)	20
Canada Hot 100 (Billboard)	67
Global 200 (Billboard)	121
Greece International (IFPI)	80
Ireland (IRMA)	76
New Zealand Hot Singles (RMNZ)	3
UK Singles (Official Charts)	76
UK Hip Hop/R&B (Official Charts)	29
UK Indie (Official Charts)	22
US Billboard Hot 100	56
US Hot R&B/Hip-Hop Songs (Billboard)	17

== Certifications ==
Region	Certification	Certified units/sales
Canada (Music Canada)	Gold	40,000^{‡}
United States (RIAA)	Gold	500,000^{‡}
^{‡} Sales+streaming figures based on certification alone.
