= Hold My Mule =

Song by Shirley Caesar

Song by Shirley Caesar
- Genre: gospel
- Length: 8:42 (digital release)

"Hold My Mule" is a 1988 gospel song by Shirley Caesar.

Telling the story of an old man named Shoutin' John who boisterously praises God for his numerous blessings to the dismay of more conservative, "spiritually dead" clergy, the song earned newfound popularity in 2016 after DJ Suede the Remix God remixed the song into the Thanksgiving anthem "You Name It!" The success of the remix would contribute to the original song reaching No. 1 on the Hot Gospel Songs chart on Billboard.

== Synopsis ==
As a lead-in to the song, Caesar tells the story of "Shoutin' John," an 86-year-old man who one day chooses to attend a church that is "spiritually dead." It opposes boisterous behavior among the congregation, including speaking in tongues and dancing, not out of theological opposition but out of fear it may embarrass the "dignitaries" that attend the church. Shoutin' John attends a service at this church and begins celebrating all over the sanctuary; an angry clergyman attempts to stop him by tackling him, but Shoutin' John gets back up and resumes dancing, eventually getting the entire congregation excited.

After the service, the concerned clergy of the church decide to visit Shoutin' John at his home, with the intent of warning him that if he does not stop his boisterous behavior, he will be barred from attending the church. When they arrive, they find that Shoutin' John owns a large and successful farm, which he still plows by hand. Shoutin' John then explains that he has received an abundance of blessings from God: his children are all healthy, none have died young nor faced legal troubles, and at age 86, he is still in good enough physical health to work his farm and to dance. Because of that, he insists that even if the church expels him, he is obligated to give praise to God for His blessings, asks the clergy to "hold my mule" as he begins dancing and praising God at that moment.

Albertina Walker and Milton Brunson are credited as featured artists on the record.

== DJ Suede the Remix God rendition ==
"You Name It!"

Single by DJ Suede the Remix God featuring Shirley Caesar
- Released: November 11, 2016
- Genre: Trap
- Length: 2:17
- Songwriters: Keenan Webb; Shirley Caesar

DJ Suede the Remix God singles chronology
"Rudolph" (2016)	"You Name It!" (2016)	"Cash Me Outside" (2017)

In 2016, DJ Suede the Remix God released a remix, consisting of a portion of the story where Shoutin' John lists the items that grow on his farm:

Look! I got beans, greens, potatoes, tomatoes, lamb, ram, hogs, dogs, chickens, turkeys, rabbits—you name it!

Under the title "You Name It!," the song went viral, (initially on Vine and Musical.ly) as part of DJ Suede's effort to create a Thanksgiving-themed Internet challenge to dance to the remix, with the help of Chris Brown. It proved to be DJ Suede's breakthrough hit, peaking at number 15 on the Bubbling Under Hot 100. In the wake of DJ Suede's remix, the original recording shot to the top of the Hot Gospel Songs chart, peaking at number one on December 10, 2016. Billboard noted that despite the uptick in interest in the song, it did not receive a corresponding rise in airplay on radio stations, in part because Caesar was focusing her efforts on more recent singles. The song has since been reused in November 2020 and November 2021 on TikTok's Thanksgiving-themed dance and challenge videos.

== Chart performance ==
=== Shirley Caesar version ===
Chart	Year	Peak position	Source
Billboard Hot Gospel Songs	2016	1	

=== You Name It! (DJ Suede the Remix God remix) ===
Chart	Year	Peak position	Source
Billboard Bubbling Under Hot 100	2016	15	
