= Doll SZN Reloaded =

EP by Asian Doll
- Released: April 8, 2020
- Recorded: 2019
- Genre: Hip hop
- Producer: Jarvis; Epikh Pro

Asian Doll chronology
Fight Night (2019)	Doll SZN Reloaded (2020)

Singles from Doll SZN Reloaded
- 1. "Come Find Me" Released: April 1, 2020

Doll SZN Reloaded is an EP by American rapper Asian Doll. It was released independently on April 8, 2020. The EP features a guest verse from King Von.

== Singles ==
"Come Find Me" was released on April 1, 2020 and served as the lead single. A music video directed by Dead Fly Films was released on the same day.

== Track list ==
Credits adapted from Tidal.

All tracks are written by Asian Doll.

No.	Title	Writer(s)	Producer(s)	Length
1.	"Come Find Me"	Misharron Allen	Jarvis	2:41
2.	"Lame N****z Pt 2"			2:11
3.	"Wet Wet"		Epikh Pro	2:24
4.	"Roll Call"		Epikh Pro	1:24
5.	"Time is Ticking"			2:00
6.	"Pull Up" (featuring King Von)			2:57
7.	"Problem"			2:48
