= Shirley Caesar =

American gospel singer (born 1938)

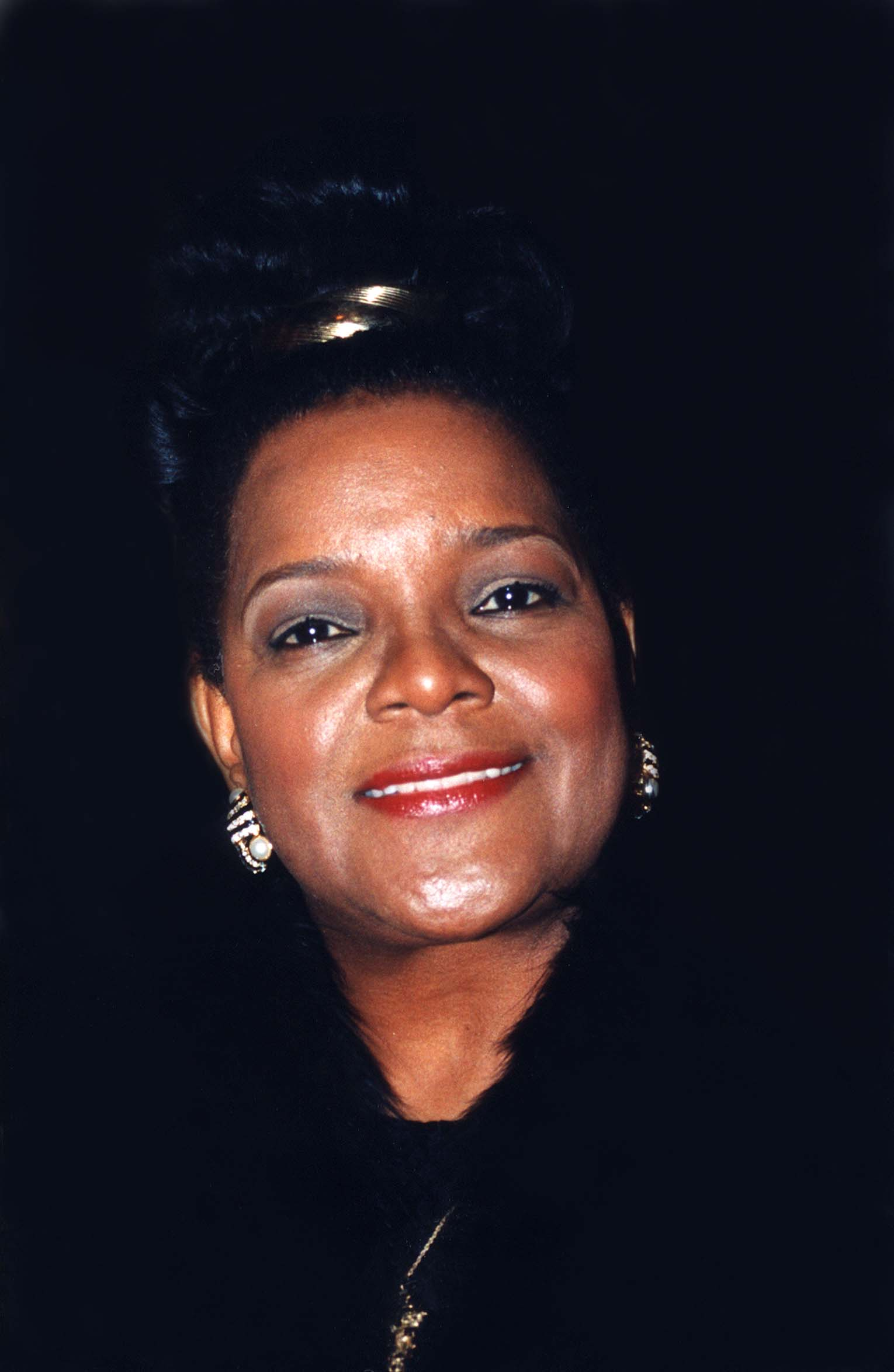
- Caesar in 1997

Background information
- Also known as: Pastor Shirley Caesar; The Queen of Gospel; The First Lady of Gospel
- Born: Shirley Ann Caesar; October 13, 1938 (age 87); Durham, North Carolina, U.S.
- Genres: Gospel; Christian hip hop
- Occupation: Singer
- Years active: 1951–present
- Labels: Artemis Gospel; Light Records
- Website: www.shirleycaesar.com

Shirley Ann Caesar-Williams (née Caesar; born October 13, 1938), known professionally as Shirley Caesar, is an American gospel singer. Her career began in 1951, when she signed to Federal Records at the age of 12. Throughout her seven decade career, Caesar has often been referred to as the "First Lady of Gospel Music" and "The Queen of Gospel Music". Her accolades include 12 Grammy Awards (along with the Grammy Lifetime Achievement Award), 15 Dove Awards, and 14 Stellar Awards.

Caesar has released over 40 albums. She has participated in over 16 compilations and three gospel musicals, including Mama I Want to Sing. Her record sells exceed over 2.2 million albums, making her one of the top-selling gospel artists. She has made several notable televised appearances, and performed at the White House for President George H. W. Bush. Caesar also gave a speech on the evolution of gospel music to the US Treasury Department. In 2026, after 75 years of recording, she won her 12th Grammy Award in the Best Gospel Performance/Song category for "Come Jesus Come" with CeCe Winans.

Her honors include the SESAC Lifetime Achievement Award and the Rhapsody & Rhythm Award from the National Museum of African American Music, along with a star on Hollywood Walk of Fame. Caesar has also been inducted into the Gospel Music Hall of Fame.

== Early life ==
Caesar was born in Durham, North Carolina. She is the 10th of 13 children. All of her siblings are now deceased. Her father Jim Caesar was a well known local gospel singer. He died suddenly when Shirley was seven years old. Her mother Hallie Caesar was partially disabled due to a lame leg. Caesar had a special bond with her mother and took care of her until her death in 1986.

== Career ==
Caesar first began singing and performing for family and friends. She began singing as Baby Shirley Caesar all over the Carolinas as invitations poured in. She could only perform on weekends due to being in school during the weekdays. Her professional music career began in 1958 at 19, when she approached Albertina Walker about joining The Caravans, one of the most popular gospel groups at that time. Albertina wanted the vocally talented young Caesar in her group after hearing her sing a solo. Caesar decided to halt her education to join the group.

Caesar recorded and performed with Albertina Walker, Cassietta George, Inez Andrews, Delores Washington, Josephine Howard, Eddie Williams, and James Herndon while in the Caravans. Her biggest hit with the Caravans was the song "Sweeping Through the City" followed by "No Coward Soldier". After 8 years with the Caravans, she decided to leave after being offered a solo recording contract with Hob Records. Her first LP on the Hob label was entitled I'll Go, backed up by the Institutional Radio Choir and includes the classics "Oh Peter, Don't Be Afraid" and "Choose Ye This Day".

Other hits soon followed, with recordings such as "Satan, We're Gonna Tear Your Kingdom Down", "God's Not Dead, He's Yet Alive" and the classic "Don't Drive Your Mama Away". In 1971, she won her first Grammy Award for her recording of "Put Your Hand in the Hand of the Man", and in 1975, her recording of the song "No Charge" became an instant hit and her first gold record. Although she had success she wanted to reach larger audiences and felt this wasn't being achieved with Hob Records; she decided not to renew her record contract with them which ended that same year.

To reach more people with her music, Caesar signed with a secular record label called Roadshow Records in 1977 and released the debut album entitled First Lady. The producer of the album titled the album First Lady because Caesar was the first female to ever record on the label. The album contained songs with strong gospel lyrics, but many within the gospel community felt that the music itself was "too worldly," and many gospel DJs refused to play it on their radio station. One song, however, "Faded Rose", later became a Caesar classic. Overall, the album sold poorly, but the "First Lady" title caught on within the gospel industry, and concert announcers, DJs and gospel promoters everywhere started introducing her as "The First Lady of Gospel Music", a title that has been associated with her ever since.

The second and final album she recorded for Roadshow was From the Heart in 1978. It was poorly received for the same reason. Caesar searched for a gospel label and decided to sign with Word Records in 1980 and went on to win several more Grammy Awards during the next several years and beyond. She stayed with Word for many years and recorded some of the biggest hits of her career such as "God's Got It All in Control", "Hold My Mule" (which later went viral as a Thanksgiving-related Internet meme under the title "You Name It"), "He's Working It Out for You", "Jesus, I Love Calling Your Name" and "You're Next in Line for a Miracle".

She has made a name for herself on the gospel music circuit, making guest appearances on the Bobby Jones gospel show and other popular television shows. Caesar credits Albertina Walker as her mentor and "Queen of Gospel Music".

Between 1981 and 1995, she received seven Dove Awards for Black Gospel Album of the Year for Live at the G.M.W.A., Celebration, Christmasing, Sailin‘, Live ... In Chicago, Go and Rejoice. She received two Black Gospel Song of the Year Awards for "He's Working It Out for You" and "Hold My Mule". She has performed with Patti LaBelle, Whitney Houston, Dorothy Norwood, Faith Evans, Dottie Peoples, Arnold Houston, Kim Burrell, John P. Kee, Kirk Franklin, Tonex, and Tye Tribbett, among others.

Caesar is also an actress. She acted in movies, such as Why Do Fools Fall in Love (1998) with Larenz Tate and Little Richard, Fighting Temptations (2003) with Beyoncé and Cuba Gooding Jr., and The Unseen (2005) with Steve Harris. She acted in an episode of The Good News in 1998 as Aunt Shirley. Caesar appeared on The Parkers in 2004.

In 2014, her song "Teach Me Master", which originally appeared on her 1972 album Get Up My Brother, was sampled by Dutch producer Bakermat as "Teach Me". It reached number 22 on the UK Singles Chart. In 2016, she found herself back at the very top of the gospel Billboard chart with her CD release Fill This House.

== Education in later life ==
After many years, Caesar finally accomplished her dream of completing her education. She had first enrolled at North Carolina College in 1956 to study business education, but left two years later to pursue her music career. She returned to school and graduated with honors from Shaw University with a Bachelor of Science degree in Business Administration in 1984. She also spent time studying at the Divinity School of Duke University and has received honorary doctorates from Shaw University and Southeastern University.

== Personal life ==
Caesar married Bishop Harold I. Williams in June 1983. The couple were co-pastors of the 1,500-member Mount Calvary Word of Faith Church in Raleigh, North Carolina until his death on July 4, 2014. While she does not have children of her own, she has two stepchildren from her husband.

Caesar is a member of Delta Sigma Theta sorority. She cites her mother as a strong influence in her decision to give so selflessly of herself. Caesar has committed a sizable portion of all concert sales to her outreach ministries. Recently, she has cut back on preaching and has appointed an executive pastor at her church, and he provides weekly sermons to the congregation while Caesar serves as senior pastor, but Caesar continues to record and perform in concert all over the country.

She continues to hold her annual outreach ministries conference. The outreach ministry provides food, clothing, shelter, toys for children, and financial assistance to those in need. She opened an eponymous store and uses the profits to help others during the holiday season.

When asked what would she still like to accomplish, she says: "I would like to do more acting...."

== Discography ==
=== Albums ===
List of studio albums + compilation albums, with selected chart positions.
Title	Details	Peak chart positions		
Title	Details	US	US Gospel	US R&B/HH
First Lady	Released: December 14, 1977; Format: Cassette, LP	—	—	36
From the Heart	Released: May 1, 1978; Format: LP	—	—	—
Jesus, I Love Calling Your Name	Released: October 1983; Format: LP, CD	—	2	—
Sailin'	Released: June 1984; Format: LP, CD	—	1	—
Celebration	Released: December 1985; Format: LP, CD	—	3	—
Her Very Best	Released: March 1987; Format: LP, CD	—	22	—
Go	Released: 1987; Format: LP, CD	—	—	—
Live in Chicago	Released: March 1988; Format: CD	—	1	—
I Remember Mama	Released: November 1989; Format: CD	—	2	—
He's Working it Out for You	Released: December 1991; Format: CD	—	1	95
Stand Still	Released: September 1993; Format: CD	—	3	—
Shirley Caesar Live...He Will Come	Released: July 1995; Format: CD	—	6	—
Christmasing	Released: November 1996; Format: CD	—	37	—
Just a Word	Released: July 1996; Format: CD	—	—	—
A Miracle in Harlem	Released: April 29, 1997; Format: CD	—	5	—
Christmas with Shirley Caesar	Released: October 20, 1998; Format: CD	—	13	—
Hymns	Released: October 30, 2001; Format: CD	—	4	—
You Can Make It	Released: August 2002; Format: CD	—	7	—
Greatest Gospel Hits	Released: August 26, 2003; Format: CD	—	4	—
Shirley Caesar & Friends	Released: September 23, 2003; Format: CD	—	6	—
I Know the Truth	Released: September 6, 2005; Format: CD	—	3	—
After 40 Years...Still Sweeping Through the City	Released: November 6, 2007; Format: CD	—	8	—
The Definitive Gospel Collection	Released: May 20, 2008; Format: CD	—	38	—
A City Called Heaven	Released: November 24, 2009; Format: CD	—	8	—
The Ultimate Collection	Released: January 11, 2011; Format: CD	—	4	—
Giving & Sharing: A Christmas Collection	Released: September 20, 2011; Format: CD	—	36	—
Platinum Gospel: Shirley Caesar	Released: October 11, 2011; Format: CD	—	41	—
Good God	Released: March 26, 2013; Format: CD	168	4	—
Harvest Gospel	Released: October 15, 2013; Format: CD	—	14	—
Timeless Gospel Classics: Inspirational/Gospel Vol. 2	Released: May 4, 2015; Format: CD	—	17	—
Fill This House	Released: June 3, 2016; Format: CD	—	1	—

=== Charting singles ===
==== As lead artist ====
List of charted singles, with year, album and chart positions
Title	Year	Peak chart positions				Album
Title	Year	US	US Gospel	US R&B /HH	JAM Air.	Album
"No Charge"	1975	91	—	40	*	No Charge
"Hold My Mule" (featuring Albertina Walker and Milton Brunson)	1988	—	1	—	*	Live in Chicago
"I Remember Mama" (Ult version)	1989	—	—	—	3	I Remember Mama
"I Know the Truth (Lies)"	2005	—	10	—	*	I Know the Truth
"Sweeping Through the City"	2007	—	26	—	*	After 40 Years...Still Sweeping Through The City
"Nobody" (featuring J. Moss)	2009	—	16	—	*	A City Called Heaven
"Favor"	2010	—	18	—	*	A City Called Heaven
"God Will Make a Way"	2013	—	3	—	*	Good God
"It's Alright, It's Ok" (featuring Anthony Hamilton)	2016	—	7	—	*	Fill This House
"Fill This House"	2016	—	21	—	*	Fill This House
"—" denotes a recording that did not chart or was not released in that territory. "*" denotes that the chart did not exist at that time.

==== Guest appearances ====
Title	Year	Peak chart positions	Album
Title	Year	US Bub.	Album
"You Name It (#UNameIt Challenge)" (DJ Suede the Remix God featuring Shirley Caesar)	2016	15	Non-album single

== Awards and nominations ==
=== BET Awards ===
The BET Awards are awarded annually by the Black Entertainment Television network. Caesar has received 3 nominations.

Year	Award	Nominated work	Result
2007	Best Gospel Artist	Herself	Nominated
2009	Best Gospel Artist	Herself	Nominated
2024	Dr. Bobby Jones Best Gospel/Inspirational Award	"Award All of the Glory"	Nominated

=== GMA Dove Awards ===
The Dove Awards are awarded annually by the Gospel Music Association. Caesar has received 16 awards from 34 nominations.

Year	Category	Work	Result
1981	Inspiration Black Gospel Album of the Year	Rejoice	Won
1982	Traditional Black Gospel Album of the Year	Go	Won
1984	Traditional Black Gospel Album of the Year	Jesus, I Love Calling Your Name	Nominated
1985	Traditional Black Gospel Album of the Year	Sailin'	Won
1986	Traditional Black Gospel Album of the Year	Celebration (as producer)	Won
1987	Traditional Black Gospel Album of the Year	Christmasing	Won
1989	Traditional Black Gospel Album of the Year	Live... In Chicago	Won
1989	Traditional Black Gospel Recorded Song of the Year	"Hold My Mule"	Won
1990	Long Form Video of the Year		Nominated
1994	Contemporary Black Gospel Recorded Song of the Year	"Stand Still"	Nominated
1994	Traditional Black Gospel Recorded Song of the Year	"Stand Still"	Nominated
1994	Traditional Black Gospel Album of the Year	Stand Still	Nominated
1995	Traditional Black Gospel Recorded Song of the Year	"He's Working It Out For You"	Won
1995	Traditional Black Gospel Album of the Year	Live at GMWA	Won
1996	Traditional Gospel Recorded Song of the Year	"Patiently Waiting"	Nominated
1996	Traditional Gospel Album of the Year	Live... He Will Come	Won
1997	Traditional Gospel Album of the Year	Just A Word	Won
1997	Traditional Gospel Recorded Song of the Year	"Just A Word"	Nominated
1998	Traditional Gospel Recorded Song of the Year	"You're Next In Line For A Miracle"	Nominated
1998	Traditional Gospel Album of the Year	A Miracle In Harlem	Won
1999	Traditional Gospel Album of the Year	Christmas with Shirley Caesar	Won
2000	Gospel Music Hall of Fame	Herself	Inducted
2001	Traditional Gospel Album of the Year	You Can Make It	Won
2001	Contemporary Gospel Recorded Song of the Year	"Rejoice"	Nominated
2002	Traditional Gospel Recorded Song of the Year	"Steal Away To Jesus"	Nominated
2002	Traditional Gospel Album of the Year	Hymns	Won
2004	Traditional Gospel Album of the Year	Shirley Caesar & Friends	Nominated
2006	Traditional Gospel Album of the Year	I Know The Truth	Nominated
2006	Traditional Gospel Recorded Song of the Year	"I Know The Truth (Lies)"	Nominated
2009	Traditional Gospel Album of the Year	Still Sweeping Through The City After 40 Years	Nominated
2011	Traditional Gospel Album of the Year	A City Called Heaven	Nominated
2011	Traditional Gospel Recorded Song of the Year	"Favor"	Nominated
2016	Traditional Gospel Recorded Song of the Year	"It's Alright, It's Ok" (with Anthony Hamilton)	Nominated
2017	Gospel Music Hall of Fame	Herself	Honored
2025	Gospel Worship Recorded Song of the Year	"Come Jesus Come" (with Cece Winans)	Won
2026	Song of the Year	"Come Jesus Come" (with CeCe Winans)	Pending
2026	Duo/Chorus Group of the Year	"Come Jesus Come" (with CeCe Winans)	Pending

=== Grammy Awards ===
The Grammy Awards are awarded annually by the National Academy of Recording Arts and Sciences. Caesar has won 1 honorary award and 12 awards from 29 nominations.

Year	Category	Work	Result
1972	Best Soul Gospel Performance	"Put Your Hand In The Hand Of The Man From Galilee"	Won
1979	Best Soul Gospel Performance, Contemporary	"Reach Out and Touch"	Nominated
1981	Best Soul Gospel Performance, Contemporary	Rejoice	Won
1982	Best Soul Gospel Performance, Traditional	Go	Nominated
1984	Best Soul Gospel Performance, Female	Jesus, I Love Calling Your Name	Nominated
1985	Best Soul Gospel Performance, Female	Sailin'	Won
1985	Best Soul Gospel Performance By A Duo Or Group	"Sailin' on the Sea of Your Love" (with Al Green	Won
1985	Best Soul Gospel Performance By A Duo Or Group	"Rejoice" (with Anne Caesar Price)	Nominated
1986	Best Soul Gospel Performance, Female	Martin	Won
1987	Best Soul Gospel Performance, Female	Celebration	Nominated
1987	Best Soul Gospel Performance By A Duo, Group, Choir Or Chorus	"Jesus Is Mine" (with Albertina Walker	Nominated
1988	Best Soul Gospel Performance, Female	"The Lord Will Make A Way"	Nominated
1989	Best Soul Gospel Performance, Female	Live... In Chicago	Nominated
1991	Best Traditional Soul Gospel Album	I Remember Mama	Nominated
1992	Best Traditional Soul Gospel Album	He's Working It Out For You	Won
1994	Best Traditional Soul Gospel Album	Stand Still	Won
1996	Best Traditional Soul Gospel Album	Shirley Caesar Live - He Will Come	Won
1997	Best Gospel Album By A Choir Or Chorus	Just A Word	Won
1998	Best Traditional Soul Gospel Album	A Miracle In Harlem	Nominated
2000	Best Traditional Soul Gospel Album	Christmas with Shirley Caesar	Won
2001	Best Traditional Soul Gospel Album	You Can Make It	Won
2002	Best Traditional Soul Gospel Album	Hymns	Nominated
2004	Best Traditional Soul Gospel Album	Shirley Caesar and Friends	Nominated
2005	Best Gospel Performance	"The Stone"	Nominated
2006	Best Traditional Soul Gospel Album	I Know The Truth	Nominated
2011	Best Traditional Gospel Album	A City Called Heaven	Nominated
2017	Best Gospel Album	Fill This House	Nominated
2017	Best Gospel Performance/Song	"It's Alright, It's Ok"	Nominated
2017	Grammy Lifetime Achievement Award	Herself	Honored
2026	Best Gospel Performance/Song	"Come Jesus Come" (with CeCe Winans)	Won

=== NAACP Image Awards ===
The NAACP Image Awards are awarded annually by the National Association for the Advancement of Colored People (NAACP). Caesar has won 2 awards from 7 nominations.

Year	Award	Nominated work	Result
1987	Outstanding Gospel Artist	Herself	Won
1997	Outstanding Gospel Artist	Herself	Nominated
1999	Outstanding Gospel Artist	Herself	Nominated
2002	Outstanding Gospel Artist - Traditional	Herself	Won
2004	Outstanding Gospel Artist	Shirley Caesar and Friends	Nominated
2010	Outstanding Gospel Album	A City Called Heaven	Nominated
2014	Outstanding Gospel Album - (Traditional or Contemporary)	Good God	Nominated

=== Soul Train Awards ===
The Soul Train Music Awards are awarded annually. Caesar has received 1 award from 11 nominations.

Year	Award	Nominated work	Result
Soul Train Music Awards
1987	Best Gospel Album - Solo	Celebration	Nominated
1988	Best Gospel Album - Solo	Her Very Best	Nominated
1989	Best Gospel Album	Live In Chicago	Nominated
1993	Best Gospel Album	He's Working It Out For You	Won
1994	Best Gospel Album	Stand Still	Nominated
1996	Best Gospel Album	He Will Come	Nominated
2013	Best Gospel/Inspirational Performance	"God Will Make A Way"	Nominated
2023	Best Gospel/Inspirational Song	"All the Glory"	Nominated
Soul Train Lady of Soul Awards
1996	Best Gospel Album	Shirley Caesar Live... He Will Come	Nominated
1998	Best Gospel Album	A Miracle In Harlem	Nominated
2001	Best Gospel Album	You Can Make It	Nominated

=== Stellar Awards ===
The Stellar Awards are awarded annually by SAGMA. Caesar has received 1 honorary award and 14 competitive awards from 27 nominations.

Year	Category	Work	Result
1986	Trailblazer Award	Herself	Honored
1987	Traditional CD of the Year	Celebration	Won
1987	Traditional Female Vocalist of the Year	Celebration	Won
1988	Traditional Female Vocalist of the Year	What A Difference	Won
1989	Traditional Female Vocalist of the Year	Live In Chicago	Won
1991	Traditional Female Vocalist of the Year	Herself	Won
1993	Traditional Female Vocalist of the Year	He's Working It Out For You	Won
1993	Traditional Album of the Year	He's Working It Out For You	Won
1995	Traditional Album of the Year	Stand Still	Won
1997	Traditional Female Artist of the Year	Herself	Won
1998	Albertina Walker Female Artist of the Year	A Miracle In Harlem	Won
1998	Traditional Female Artist of the Year	A Miracle In Harlem	Won
1998	Traditional Album of the Year	A Miracle In Harlem	Won
2002	Traditional Female Vocalist of the Year	You Can Make It	Won
2002	Traditional Female Vocalist of the Year	Artist of the Year	Nominated
2002	Traditional Female Vocalist of the Year	Female Vocalist of the Year	Nominated
2007	Traditional Female Vocalist of the Year	I Know The Truth	Won
2007	Female Vocalist of the Year	I Know The Truth	Nominated
2009	Female Vocalist of the Year	After 40 Years... Still Sweeping Through the City	Nominated
2011	Traditional CD of the Year	A City Called Heaven	Nominated
2011	Traditional Female Vocalist of the Year	A City Called Heaven	Nominated
2011	Music Video of the Year	"Playground in Heaven"	Nominated
2014	Albertina Walker Female Vocalist of the Year	Good God	Nominated
2014	Traditional Female Vocalist of the Year	Good God	Nominated
2017	Albertina Walker Female Vocalist of the Year	Fill This House	Nominated
2017	Contemporary CD of the Year	Fill This House	Nominated
2017	Traditional Female Vocalist of the Year	Fill This House	Nominated
2026	Duo/Chorus Group of the Year	"Come Jesus Come" (with CeCe Winans)	Nominated

=== Miscellaneous honors ===
Year	Organization	Category	Work	Result
2010	North Carolina Music Hall of Fame		Herself	Inducted
2016	National Museum of African American Music	Rhapsody & Rhythm Award	Herself	Honored
2016	Hollywood Chamber of Commerce	2,583rd star on the Hollywood Walk of Fame	Herself	inducted
2021	Black Music & Entertainment Walk of Fame		Herself	Inducted
2025	Missouri Gospel Music Hall of Fame		Herself	Inducted

- Caesar is a recipient of a 1999 National Heritage Fellowship from the National Endowment for the Arts, which is the United States' highest honor in the folk and traditional arts.
- Caesar performed for President Barack Obama and Michelle Obama at the White House in 2015, along with Aretha Franklin.
