= Bhad Bhabie =

American rapper and internet personality (born 2003)

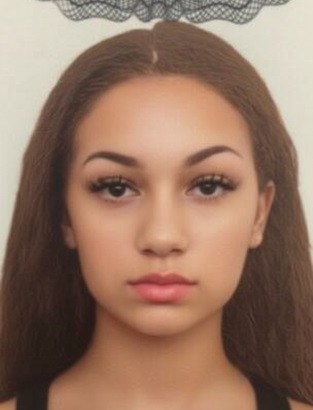
- An undated photograph of Bhad Bhabie

Background information
- Born: Danielle Marie Bregoli; March 26, 2003 (age 23); Boynton Beach, Florida, U.S.
- Genres: Hip-hop; trap
- Occupations: Rapper; songwriter; media personality
- Years active: 2016–present
- Labels: Atlantic; B.H.A.D. Music
- Partner: Le Vaughn (2020–2025)
- Children: 1
- Website: bhadbhabie.com

Danielle Marie Bregoli (born March 26, 2003), known professionally as Bhad Bhabie (pronounced "bad baby"), is an American rapper, songwriter, and media personality. She gained viral recognition after appearing on the talk show Dr. Phil in 2016, when her one-liners and catchphrases briefly became Internet memes.

Bregoli's 2017 debut single, "These Heaux", peaked at number 77 on the Billboard Hot 100 and made her the youngest female rapper to have a song enter the chart. She then signed with Atlantic Records to re-release the song and its follow-up singles, "Hi Bich" and "Gucci Flip Flops" (with Lil Yachty), both of which received platinum certifications by the Recording Industry Association of America (RIAA) and preceded her debut mixtape, 15 (2018). She self-released her 2025 single "Ms. Whitman", which entered the Billboard Hot 100 and several international charts.

== Life and career ==
=== 2003–2015: Early life and background ===
Bhad Bhabie was born Danielle Marie Bregoli in Boynton Beach, Florida. Her parents, Ira Peskowitz and Barbara Ann Bregoli, dated for a year before Barbara became pregnant, then separated when Danielle was an infant. She is of Ashkenazi Jewish descent through her father and Italian descent through her mother. Bregoli was raised in a Catholic household primarily by her mother and has only recently reconciled with her father, a deputy at the Palm Beach County Sheriff's Office.

=== 2016–2017: Dr. Phil appearance, rehab, and legal issues ===
On September 14, 2016, Bregoli and her mother Barbara Ann were interviewed on Dr. Phil for a segment titled "I Want to Give Up My Car-Stealing, Knife-Wielding, Twerking 13-Year-Old Daughter Who Tried to Frame Me for a Crime". They appeared on the show to discuss Bregoli's behavior, which included stealing a crew member's car while the episode was being filmed. When Bregoli became irritated by the audience's laughter, she told them, "Catch me outside, how about that?", challenging them to a fight outside the studio. Her affected accent made the phrase sound like "Cash me ousside, how bow dah", which became a meme, and Bregoli became known as the "'Cash Me Outside' Girl". On February 10, 2017, Bregoli reappeared on the show without a studio audience. Her first appearance on the show, and the catchphrase it spawned, inspired a single based on the clip ("Cash Me Outside"), which was recorded by DJ Suede The Remix God and entered the Billboard Hot 100, Streaming Songs, and Hot R&B/Hip-Hop Songs charts in its March 4, 2017, issue. The song then led to a series of dance videos uploaded to YouTube.

Bregoli and her mother sued three companies for "infringing her intellectual property rights" by using her catchphrase without permission. She also threatened to sue Walmart for using her catchphrase on T-shirts. She was nominated for the 2017 MTV Movie & TV Awards in the "Trending" category based on the catchphrase.

After appearing on Dr. Phil, Bregoli spent time at the Turn-About Ranch, a facility for "troubled teens" in Escalante, Utah. She was later arrested and pleaded guilty to charges of grand theft, cannabis possession, and filing a false police report, for which she was sentenced to five years' probation in July 2017, but the probation ended in March 2018 after she hired a new lawyer. In March 2021, Bregoli uploaded a video to her YouTube channel in which she says she experienced and witnessed abuse at the Turn-About Ranch. She accused staffers of forcing her to sit still for three days straight without being allowed to sleep, using physical restraint on other teenagers, and ignoring reports of bullying. She also criticized Dr. Phil for sending teenagers to the facility. In an April 2021 interview with NewsNation, he said he was unaware of the ranch's actions and did not get progress reports from it. Bregoli responded with a video in which she said the ranch sends progress reports directly to the show.

=== 2017–2018: Career beginnings and 15 ===
In early 2017, Bregoli was signed by music manager Adam Kluger and initially received industry backlash.

"Everybody got weird," he says. "I wasn't even mad that they were bashing Danielle, because everyone was bashing Danielle at the time. I was like: 'You really don't believe that I know what I'm doing? Don't bet the horse, bet the jockey.'"

Bregoli released her first single "These Heaux" (pronounced "hoes") on August 24, 2017. The song reached number 77 on the Billboard Hot 100, making Bregoli the youngest female rap artist to debut on the music chart. Its success prompted Atlantic Records to sign Bregoli to a multi-album recording contract. In September, she remixed the Kodak Black song "Roll in Peace" and Tee Grizzley and Lil Yachty song "From the D to the A". On September 22, she released "Hi Bich", which reached number 68 on the Billboard Hot 100, and the next day "Whachu Know", as a single alongside the video, which received over 3 million views in 24 hours. On November 30, she released another single, "I Got It", followed by "Mama Don't Worry (Still Ain't Dirty)" in December. In the latter, she rapped about her past, and that her appearance in Dr. Phil should be forgotten. This theme was echoed in the video for "Both of Em", in which she buried her old self in a shallow grave. In "Hi Bich (Remix)" she collaborated for the first time with other artists, including YBN Nahmir, Rich the Kid, and Asian Doll (in the video, YBN Nahmir was replaced by MadeinTYO for unknown reasons).

On March 26, 2018, she celebrated her birthday with a new song release, "Gucci Flip Flops", featuring Lil Yachty. Two days later, she received a gold certification from the RIAA for her single "Hi Bich". In mid-April, she released a freestyle called "Who Run It".

Her first tour across North America and Europe, together with Asian Doll, began on April 14, 2018. On May 2, the video for "Gucci Flip Flops" was released. The song then became a moderate hit and debuted at number 80 on the Billboard's Hot 100; it peaked with one upward position on the chart. Bregoli was nominated for a 2018 Billboard Music Award in the Best Female Rap Artist category, along with Cardi B and Nicki Minaj.

On June 14, Bregoli released the single "Trust Me" featuring Ty Dolla Sign. On July 26, she released the video for "Trust Me", featuring guest appearances by Theo Von and Bella Thorne.

On August 14, Bregoli released her debut mixtape, 15. It featured guest appearances by Lil Yachty, Ty Dolla $ign, YG, Lil Baby, City Girls, and Asian Doll. The next day, she received a gold certification from the Recording Industry Association of America for her single "Gucci Flip Flops". On August 30, Bregoli released the single "Yung and Bhad" featuring City Girls. Two days before the release of her debut mixtape, she released a video for Thot Opps (Clout Drop) and Bout That. On September 18, she released 15. She released the single "Geek'd" featuring Lil Baby, with a video released two days later. Other album tracks such as "No More Love", "Famous", "Count It" and "Shhh" were presented as video shorts on YouTube. On October 17, she released "Juice" featuring rapper YG. Its accompanying video followed, with a guest appearance by UFC Women's Featherweight Champion Cris Cyborg; YG did not appear in the video.

On November 6, Bregoli embarked on a tour spanning the Western U.S., New Zealand, and Australia. It was received favorably, with praise for Bregoli's stage presence.

On November 16, controversy arose when Bregoli threw her drink at, and attempted to assault, Iggy Azalea while attending Cardi B's Fashion Nova launch party. Bregoli told paparazzi that she had done it due to comments Azalea made on Instagram. Azalea responded with a series of tweets condemning Bregoli.

=== 2019–2023: Bringing Up Bhabie and expansion ===
In January 2019, Bregoli released two singles: "Babyface Savage" featuring Tory Lanez and "Bestie" featuring Kodak Black. The song also charted on Canada and on the Bubbling Under Hot 100 in the US, extending her record of the youngest female to have more entries in over 20 years. The music video reached 20 million views in under two months. "Bestie"'s music video, directed by Michael Garcia, was published on February 25 and praised for its visuals and storyline. It featured product placement by multiple brands and had a cameo appearance from late rapper DMX.

In the same month, she announced an endorsement deal with Copycat Beauty, where she will promote the brand's products on her social media and music videos. She reportedly made a percentage of the sales for the six-month deal—an estimated total of US$900,000. The deal was successful, as the company's sales spiked, reaching 500,000 on its first day.

Bregoli also released the trailer of her reality show, Bringing Up Bhabie, which detailed her daily life and musical career. The show was published on Snapchat as a Snap Original. The first season had 12 episodes, and TMZ reported ratings of over ten million unique viewers in its first 24 hours. The publication also reported she was set to earn over US$10 million in 2019. During September 2019, the reality show was renewed by Snapchat for a second season due to air in summer 2020, but later delayed due to the COVID-19 pandemic and canceled later that year.

During April and May 2019, Bregoli released a remix of "Bestie" by Spenda C Nola Bounce and a radio version of the song with Megan Thee Stallion. She released the version with Megan in order for her song to be played on the radio as radio stations were boycotting Kodak Black at the time. Bregoli also released the double singles "Lotta Dem" and her song "Spaz", which features YBN Nahmir. The making of the "Spaz" music video was recorded for her Snapchat show Bringing Up Bhabie.

The following month, she released the single "Get Like Me", which features NLE Choppa. On August 22, 2019, she announced the release of her mobile game Ride or Die, which features Bregoli as an animated character where the player has to get her to run from the police.

In December 2019, a video of Bregoli wearing box braids was posted to Instagram, causing controversy over cultural appropriation and her subsequent decision to go on a social media hiatus. In February 2020, she ended her hiatus with a freestyle to Nicki Minaj's song "Yikes" and another song called "$" with Lil Gotit. On April 22, she released the single "That's What I Said", a track addressing her critics.

On March 17, 2020, actress Skai Jackson filed a restraining order against Bregoli following a heavily documented feud in which Bregoli sent Jackson death threats and repeatedly harassed Jackson's mother on social media. Jackson dropped the restraining order on June 15.

In June, Bregoli entered a 31-day rehab facility for childhood trauma and addiction to prescription medication. She received support from celebrities such as Demi Lovato, Blac Chyna and Charli XCX.

In October, she released her second single of 2020, "Do It Like Me", which quickly went viral on the social media platform TikTok.

In April 2021, shortly after her eighteenth birthday, Bregoli opened an OnlyFans account, earning over $1 million in revenue in the first six hours, including over $757,000 from subscriptions, $267,000 from message payments, and $5,000 in tips. She later demonstrated evidence of earnings of more than $50 million, which was initially met with skepticism. By September 2024, Bhad Bhabie earned $1,489,374 per month on OnlyFans and remained the highest-paid creator on the platform; however, by September 2025 she had fallen to fourth-highest-paid, earning upwards of $1.3 million a month.

On April 4, TMZ reported that she and Paris Hilton were collaborating on a troubled teen program to focus on abuse experienced by teens at camps.

In September 2021, she launched her own record label, Bhad Music, where she planned to release her upcoming debut EP. On September 17, she released her first single of 2021, "Miss Understood", which peaked at 8 on the Billboard Digital Song Sales Chart. It is scheduled to be the lead single of her upcoming debut EP.

=== 2024–present: Return to music ===
In December 2024, Bregoli and Alabama Barker (the daughter of American musician Travis Barker) were engaged in a feud after Bregoli accused Barker of stealing her then-boyfriend, Le Vaughn. At the time, Bregoli was undergoing chemotherapy and had just had a baby with him. The two went back and forth on social media, exchanging jabs, and Bregoli released a diss track titled "Over Cooked". Barker denied Bregoli's claims, and in the same month she released her own diss track, "Cry Bhabie". Still in the same month, Bregoli released another diss track, "Ms. Whitman", which sampled the beat from Kanye West's song "Carnival".

== Personal life ==
Bregoli dated rapper Le Vaughn from 2020 to February 2025. They have a daughter, born in March 2024. In July 2024, Bregoli accused Vaughn of domestic violence, posting security footage of him slamming her onto the ground; she later deleted the post. In March 2025, Vaughn was shot in his little finger at Sam's Hofbrau, a strip club on Olympic Boulevard in Los Angeles. Later that month, Bregoli left California for safety reasons, saying three gunmen had tried to break into her home.

On November 8, 2024, Bregoli revealed her blood cancer diagnosis after social media noticed her drastic weight loss.

Bregoli began undergoing cosmetic procedures when she was 16 years old, beginning with silicone injections to her buttocks. In January 2025, Bregoli wrote on Instagram that she had undergone rhinoplasty to remove the hump from her nose. In 2024, she had fillers in her chin, lips, and cheeks dissolved. She spent $40,000 on veneers in 2019.

== Discography ==
=== Mixtapes ===
List of mixtapes, with selected details
Title	Mixtape details
15	Released: September 18, 2018; Label: Atlantic; Format: Digital download, streaming

=== Singles ===
List of singles as lead artist, with selected chart positions, showing year released and album name
Title	Year	Peak chart positions							Certifications	Album
Title	Year	US	US R&B/HH	CAN	IRE	NZ Hot	UK	WW	Certifications	Album
"These Heaux"	2017	77	34	57	—	—	—	—	RIAA: Gold	Non-album single
"Hi Bich"	2017	68	29	66	—	—	— (Note: "Hi Bich" did not enter the UK Singles chart, but peaked at number 88 on UK's Streaming chart.)	—	RIAA: Platinum; MC: Gold	15
"Whachu Know"	2017	—	—	—	—	—	—	—		Non-album singles
"I Got It"	2017	—	—	—	—	—	—	—		Non-album singles
"Mama Don't Worry (Still Ain't Dirty)"	2017	—	—	—	—	—	—	—		Non-album singles
"Both of Em"	2018	—	—	—	—	—	—	—		Non-album singles
"Gucci Flip Flops" (featuring Lil Yachty)	2018	79	39	62	—	—	—	—	RIAA: Platinum; BPI: Silver; MC: Gold; RMNZ: Platinum	15
"Trust Me" (featuring Ty Dolla Sign)	2018	—	— (Note: "Trust Me" did not enter the Hot R&B/Hip-Hop Songs chart, but peaked at number nine on the Bubbling Under R&B/Hip-Hop Singles chart.)	—	—	—	—	—		15
"Yung and Bhad" (featuring City Girls)	2018	—	—	—	—	—	—	—		15
"Geek'd" (featuring Lil Baby)	2018	—	—	—	—	—	—	—		15
"Babyface Savage" (featuring Tory Lanez)	2019	— (Note: "Babyface Savage" did not enter the Billboard Hot 100 Songs chart, but entered the Bubbling Under Hot 100 Singles chart.)	— (Note: "Babyface Savage" did not enter the Hot R&B/Hip-Hop Songs chart, but peaked at number eight on the Bubbling Under R&B/Hip-Hop Singles chart.)	78	—	—	—	—		Non-album singles
"Bestie" (featuring Kodak Black or Megan Thee Stallion)	2019	—	— (Note: "Bestie" did not enter the Hot R&B/Hip-Hop Songs chart, but peaked at number eight on the Bubbling Under R&B/Hip-Hop Singles chart.)	—	—	—	—	—	RIAA: Gold; RMNZ: Gold	Non-album singles
"Spaz" (featuring YBN Nahmir)	2019	—	—	—	—	—	—	—		Non-album singles
"Lotta Dem"	2019	—	—	—	—	—	—	—		Non-album singles
"Get Like Me" (featuring NLE Choppa)	2019	—	—	—	—	—	—	—		Non-album singles
"That's What I Said"	2020	—	—	—	—	—	—	—		Non-album singles
"Do It Like Me"	2020	—	—	—	—	—	—	—		Non-album singles
"Miss Understood"	2021	—	—	—	—	—	—	—		Non-album singles
"Bi Polar"	2021	—	—	—	—	—	—	—		Non-album singles
"22" (Remix) (with Lil Candy Paint)	2021	—	—	—	—	—	—	—		Non-album singles
"Mommy Mode"	2024	—	—	—	—	—	—	—		Non-album singles
"Over Cooked"	2025	—	—	—	—	—	—	—		Non-album singles
"Ms. Whitman"	2025	56	17	67	76	3	76	121	RIAA: Gold; MC: Gold	Non-album singles
"OG Crashout"	2025	—	—	—	—	27	—	—		Non-album singles
"Yams" (with YKNiece)	2025	—	—	—	—	—	—	—		Non-album singles
"—" denotes a title that did not chart, or was not released in that territory.

=== Promotional singles ===
List of promotional singles, showing year released and album name
Title	Year	Album
"15 (Intro)"	2018	15
"Bout That"	2018	15
"Thot Opps (Clout Drop)"	2018	15
"$" (featuring Lil Gotit)	2020	Non-album promotional single

=== Guest appearances ===
Title	Year	Other artist(s)	Album
"Cash Me Outside" (Note: "Cash Me Outside", entered the Hot R&B/Hip-Hop Songs chart, the Canadian Hot 100, and the Billboard Hot 100, having peaked on every chart at number thirty, seventy-nine, and seventy-two respectively.)	2017	DJ Suede the Remix God	Non-album single
"Playboy Style"	2018	Clean Bandit, Charli XCX	What Is Love?
"Whatcha Gon Do"	2019	Benzi, Rich the Kid, 24hrs	Non-album singles
"Vibe Check"	2022	Olivia Lunny	Non-album singles
"Hoe" (Benjamin Elgar featuring Bhad Bhabie)	2025	Benjamin Elgar	Non-album singles

=== Music videos ===
Title	Year	Artist(s)	Director(s)
'"These Heaux"	2017	Bhad Bhabie	GOOD BOY SHADY
"Hi Bich" / "Whachu Know"	2017	Bhad Bhabie	Ronny J
"I Got It"	2017	Bhad Bhabie	—N/a
"Mama Don't Worry (Still Ain't Dirty)"	2017	Bhad Bhabie	—N/a
"Both of Em"	2018	Bhad Bhabie	—N/a
"Hi Bich (Remix)"	2018	Bhad Bhabie (featuring Rich The Kid, Asian Doll and MadeinTYO)	—N/a
"Gucci Flip Flops"	2018	Bhad Bhabie (featuring Lil Yachty)	Nicholaus Goosen
"Trust Me"	2018	Bhad Bhabie (featuring Ty Dolla $ign)	Nicholaus Goosen
"Thot Opps (Clout Drop)" / "Bout That"	2018	Bhad Bhabie	Nicholaus Goosen
"Geek'd"	2018	Bhad Bhabie (featuring Lil Baby)	Nicholaus Goosen
"No More Love" / "Famous" (Short Video)	2018	Bhad Bhabie	Nicholaus Goosen
"Count It"	2018	Bhad Bhabie and $hirak	Nicholaus Goosen
"Juice"	2018	Bhad Bhabie (featuring YG)	Cris Cyborg
"Babyface Savage"	2019	Bhad Bhabie (featuring Tory Lanez)	—N/a
"Bestie"	2019	Bhad Bhabie (featuring Kodak Black)	D. A. Doman
"Get Like Me"	2019	Bhad Bhabie (featuring NLE Choppa)	—N/a
"Babyface Savage" (TikTok Dance Compilation Video)	2019	Bhad Bhabie (featuring Tory Lanez)	—N/a
"That's What I Said"	2020	Bhad Bhabie	Go Grizzly
"Ms. Whitman"	2025	Bhad Bhabie	Apex Visions
"OG CRASHOUT"	2025	Bhad Bhabie	Apex Visions
"Hoe"	2025	Benjamin Elgar (featuring Bhad Bhabie)	Benjamin Elgar
"Yams"	2025	Bhad Bhabie (featuring YK Niece)	Loopy Ferrell

== Filmography ==
- Dr. Phil (2016–2017; 2 appearances)
- Bringing Up Bhabie (2019; main cast)
- Drugstore June (2024; cameo)

== Tours ==
=== Headlining ===
- Bhanned in the USA Tour (2018–2019)
- The 2020 Tour (2020; cancelled)

== Awards and nominations ==
Year	Association	Category	Result
2018	Billboard Music Awards	Top Rap Female Artist	Nominated
