= Fill This House =

Studio album by Shirley Caesar
- Released: June 3, 2016
- Studio: C-Town Sound, Cleveland; G&M, Durham; Ocean Way, Nashville; River Rock, Minneapolis; Timeless, New York City
- Genre: Gospel
- Label: Light, eOne

Shirley Caesar chronology
Good God (2013)	Fill This House (2016)

Fill This House is an album by Shirley Caesar. It earned Caesar a Grammy Award nomination for Best Gospel Album.

== Track listing ==
1. "It’s Alright, It’s Ok" (feat. Anthony Hamilton)
2. "He Won’t Fail You"
3. "Survive This" (feat. Hezekiah Walker)
4. "Fill This House"
5. "Need Him Now"
6. "Mother Emanuel"
7. "Prayer Changes Things"
8. "Be Happy (I Command U to Live)"
9. "Sow Righteous Seeds (Hymn)"
10. "Sow Righteous Seeds"
11. "Prayer Works"

== Charts ==
Chart (2016)	Peak position
US Independent Albums (Billboard)	22
US Top Gospel Albums (Billboard)	1
