= Harold Ivory Williams =

American bishop (1921–2014)

Bishop Harold Ivory Williams (April 20, 1921 - July 4, 2014) was the senior prelate of the Mount Calvary Holy Churches of America Inc. from 1972 - 2009.

He was married to the gospel singer Shirley Caesar.

== Early life ==
Harold I. Williams was born April 20, 1921, in Denton, Maryland and attended the Frederick Douglass High School. He gained his B.A. Degree from Coppin State College, as well as a Master of Divinity and a Doctorate of Ministry from Howard University in Washington, D.C.

Williams also took post-graduate studies at the St. Mary's Seminary in Baltimore, Maryland.

== Career ==
Williams joined the Mount Calvary Holy Church at the age of 16.

In 1949, he pastored his first church in Washington D.C., Mount Calvary Holy Church #1. Mt. Calvary later merged with the Christ is the Answer Church pastored by Rev. Alfred Owens to become Greater Mt. Calvary Holy Church. The church, with over 4000 members, is also the national headquarters for Mt. Calvary Holy Churches of America, Inc. In 1958, Williams co-founded the Mount Calvary Holy Temple in Baltimore, Maryland with his mother, Ethel Williams, and his first wife, Amanda Williams.

In 1972, Williams was appointed the Sr. Bishop and Overseer of the Mount Calvary Holy Churches of America, Inc., which has grown to over 60 churches in the United States and abroad since 1948.

Williams was also a member of the Ministers' Conference of Baltimore and Vicinity; the Baltimore Clergy In Action; the Pastor's Conference; the Pentecostal Ministers Alliance; and the Bishop's Council International.

== Personal life ==
Williams and Amanda Williams were married for 35 years before her death, and were the parents of two children, Harold Ivory Williams Jr, and Hope Ivy Mason. He also had two grandchildren.

He married Shirley Caesar in 1983. The couple were co-pastors of the 1,500-member Mount Calvary Word of Faith Church in Raleigh, North Carolina until his death.
