= That's On Me (Yella Beezy song) =

2017 song by Yella Beezy

Single by Yella Beezy

from the album Lite Work, Vol. 2 and Ain't No Goin' Bacc
- Released: October 31, 2017
- Genre: Hip hop; trap
- Length: 3:39
- Label: Independent
- Songwriter: Deandre Conway
- Producer: Shun On Da Beat

Yella Beezy singles chronology
"Favors" (2017)	"That's On Me" (2017)	"Up One" (2018)

Music video
- "That's On Me" on YouTube

"That's On Me" is a song by American rapper Yella Beezy, released independently on October 31, 2017, as the second single from his second mixtape Lite Work, Vol. 2 (2017). The song was sent to radio on July 23, 2018. It is considered his breakout hit. Following its peak at number 56 on the Billboard Hot 100, Beezy was signed to L.A. Reid's Hitco record label.

The official remix of the song was released on October 26, 2018. It features vocals from American rappers 2 Chainz, T.I., Rich the Kid, Jeezy, Boosie Badazz and Trapboy Freddie, and appears on Yella Beezy's third mixtape Ain't No Goin' Bacc (2018).

== Charts ==
=== Weekly charts ===
Chart (2017–2018)	Peak position
US Billboard Hot 100	56
US Hot R&B/Hip-Hop Songs (Billboard)	25

=== Year-end charts ===
Chart (2018)	Position
US Hot R&B/Hip-Hop Songs (Billboard)	82

== Certifications ==
Region	Certification	Certified units/sales
United States (RIAA)	Gold	500,000^{‡}
^{‡} Sales+streaming figures based on certification alone.
