= Promposal (TV series) =

American reality docuseries

- Genre: Reality
- Country of origin: United States
- Original language: English
- No. of seasons: 1
- No. of episodes: 8

Production
- Executive producers: Adam Gonzalez; Nina L. Diaz
- Cinematography: John Valkos
- Production company: New Remote Productions

Original release
- Network: MTV
- Release: May 14 – July 4, 2017

Promposal is an American reality docuseries that premiered on MTV on May 14, 2017, after season 10 of My Super Sweet 16. Every episode features a teenager asking for someone to be their prom date using elaborate stunts or themed fashion and choreographies.

== Episodes ==
| No. | Title | Original release date | U.S. viewers (millions) |
|---|---|---|---|
| 1 | "Promposal Pep Rally" | May 14, 2017 | 0.27 |
| 2 | "Panic at the Promposal" | May 21, 2017 | 0.19 |
| 3 | "Sky High Promposal" | May 29, 2017 | 0.31 |
| 4 | "Enchanted Promposal" | June 5, 2017 | 0.36 |
| 5 | "Prompocalypse" | June 12, 2019 | 0.24 |
| 6 | "I'd Dive for Prom" | June 21, 2017 | N/A |
| 7 | "Promposal on Pointe" | June 28, 2017 | N/A |
| 8 | "Top of the World Promposal" | July 4, 2017 | N/A |
