= Cash Me Outside (song) =

2017 single by DJ Suede the Remix God

Single by DJ Suede the Remix God
- Released: January 24, 2017
- Recorded: September 14, 2016
- Genre: Trap
- Length: 2:06; 2:57 (extended version)
- Label: Empire
- Songwriters: Keenan Webb; Danielle Bregoli; Phillip McGraw

DJ Suede the Remix God singles chronology
"You Name It!" (2016)	"Cash Me Outside" (2017)	"Game Over (Super Mario World)" (2017)

Bhad Bhabie singles chronology
"Cash Me Outside" (2017)	"These Heaux" (2017)

Audio
- "Cash Me Outside" on YouTube

"Cash Me Outside," or Cash Me Ousside, stylized as "Cash Me Outside (#CashMeOutside)" is a song by American producer DJ Suede the Remix God. It samples a viral video clip from the TV show Dr. Phil featuring then-13-year-old Danielle Bregoli, who is now known as the rapper Bhad Bhabie, saying "Cash me outside, how 'bout that?". The song was released on January 24, 2017.

== Background and composition ==
On January 24, 2017, YouTube channel TrapMusicHDTV uploaded the original remix to YouTube. The remix was one of the biggest driving forces in the virality of the novel "Cash me outside" meme, which originated from a Dr. Phil clip featuring then-13-year-old Danielle Bregoli, hollering quotes such as "Cash me outside", and "How bout dat". The quotes are layered on top of a trap percussion with an electric piano, trumpet MIDIs, heavy bass, snaps, and needle scratches, among other sounds.

== Reception ==
In the issue dated February 25, 2017, "Cash Me Outside" debuted on the Bubbling Under Hot 100 at number 22 before debuting on the Billboard Hot 100 at number 88 the next week, later going on to peak at number 72, and spending 3 weeks on the Hot 100 in total, making it DJ Suede's highest-charting song, and third charting song following the success of "I Got Skills" and "You Name It! (#UNameItChallenge)," which peaked at number 4 and number 15 respectively, on the Bubbling Under Hot 100, both back in December 2016. "Cash Me Outside" also entered other Billboard charts, such as Hot R&B/Hip-Hop Songs, Streaming Songs, and international charts such as the Canadian Hot 100. The song, at the time, was likely most intriguing for fusing Bregoli's "gangster" or "savage" additude with a trap beat. Suede was invited to talk to Rolling Stone about internet fame.

Suede was sued in 2018 by Danielle and her mother for not paying revenue for the remix.

== Charts ==
Chart (2017)	Peak position
Canadian Hot 100	79
US Billboard Hot 100	72
US Billboard Hot R&B/Hip-Hop Songs	30
