= Cuban Doll =

American rapper and social media influencer (born 1998)

- Also known as: Cuban Da Savage, Cuban Doll
- Born: Taylor Williams; May 12, 1998 (age 27)
- Origin: Dallas, Texas, U.S.
- Genres: Hip hop; trap; drill
- Occupation: Rapper
- Years active: 2015–present

Taylor Williams, better known as Cuban Doll, Cuban Da Savage or simply Cuban, is an American rapper and social media influencer.

== Early life ==
Williams was born on May 12, 1998, in Dallas, Texas, where she was raised alongside a younger sibling and an older sibling.

== Career ==
Cuban Doll became known with the release of her single "Rat B*tch" in July 2017. She has since released albums such as Aaliyah Keef (2017) Cuban Link (2017), and Karma (2019), along with popular songs such as "Walk Thru", "Nights Like This," "Naggin," "Money Talk" and "Bankrupt" featuring Lil Baby and Lil Yachty.

== Discography ==
Albums

- Cuban Link (2017)
- Aaliyah Keef (2017)
- Karma (2018)
- Savage Life (2019)
- Savage Doll (2022)
- All or Nothing (2023)
