= Yella Beezy =

American rapper and convicted murderer (born 1991)

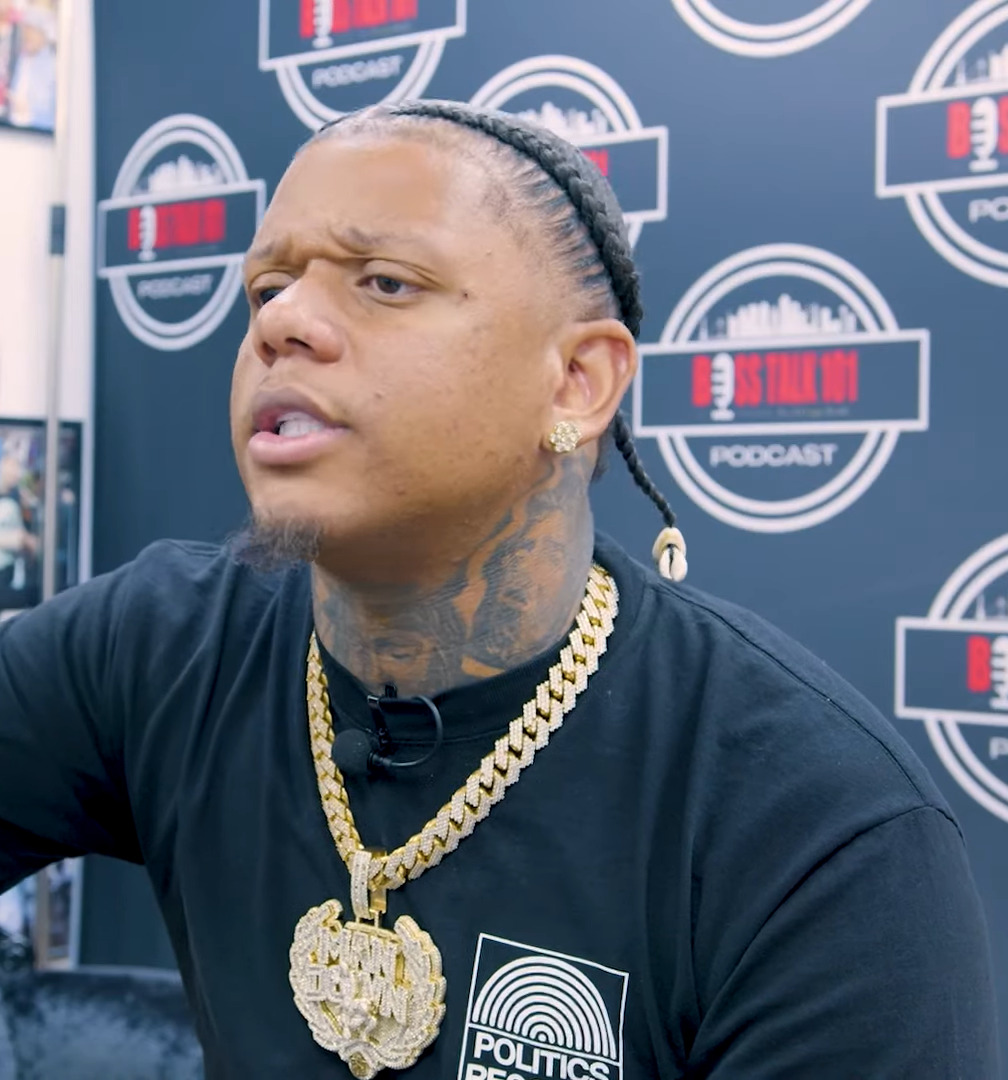
- Yella Beezy in 2025

Background information
- Born: Markies Deandre Conway; October 21, 1991 (age 35)
- Genres: Southern hip-hop; trap
- Occupations: Rapper; singer; songwriter
- Years active: 2006–2026
- Labels: Hitco; PMG; Asylum
- Criminal information
- Status: Incarcerated since November 11, 2026
- Conviction: Capital murder
- Penalty: Life imprisonment without the possibility of parole

Markies Deandre Conway (born October 21, 1991), better known by the stage name Yella Beezy, is an American rapper and convicted murderer from Dallas, Texas. He is best known for his 2017 single "That's On Me", which entered the Billboard Hot 100 and received gold certification by the Recording Industry Association of America (RIAA). His 2019 single, "Bacc At It Again" (with Quavo and Gucci Mane), also did so. On November 11, 2026, Conway was found guilty of capital murder by a Dallas County jury in connection with the 2020 killing of fellow rapper MO3 (Melvin Noble). The jury unanimously convicted Conway of capital murder for remuneration, and he was sentenced to life imprisonment without the possibility of parole.

== Early life ==
Conway was born and raised in the Oak Cliff neighborhood of Dallas, Texas. When Conway was 12, his father was murdered at their home on Mother's Day. Throughout his childhood he played basketball and football and his original aspiration was to become a professional football player. He attended Obanion Middle School in Garland and later graduated from Lancaster High School.

== Career ==
=== 2017–present: Billboard success and charting mixtapes ===
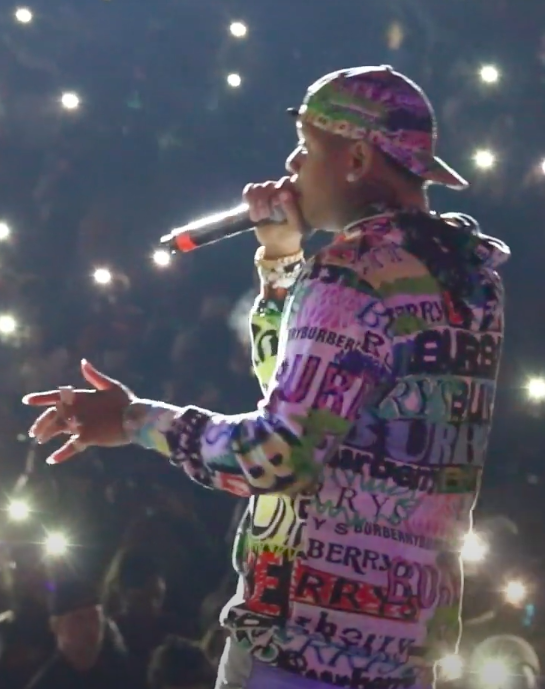
Yella Beezy performing at a concert in 2018

Conway began writing song lyrics and rapping at the age of 13. He was inspired by artists such as Boosie Badazz and Kevin Gates. At the age of 14 he released his first mixtape, Mash Mode Overload. In 2012, his second mixtape, Lil Yella Mane, was released. Conway's first hit single came in 2015 with "Trap in Designer" off of his mixtape Broke Nights Rich Days.

In 2017, Yella Beezy released his mixtape Lite Work, Vol. 2. It featured the song "That's On Me", which peaked at number 56 on the Billboard Hot 100 and also led to Yella Beezy getting signed by Chris Turner (A&R) to L.A. Reid's label Hitco.

In 2018, the mixtape Ain't No Goin Bacc was released. It included the hits "What I Did" (featuring Kevin Gates), "Up One" (featuring Lil Baby) and a remixed version of "That's On Me" (featuring 2 Chainz, T.I., and Boosie Badazz). That same year, Yella Beezy began earning fame from opening for Jay-Z and Beyoncé in Dallas and Houston during the On the Run II Tour.

In 2019, the mixtape Baccend Beezy was the first mixtape by Yella Beezy that was released under his label Hitco. The mixtape featured the hit singles "Bacc At It Again" (featuring Quavo and Gucci Mane) and "Restroom Occupied" (featuring Chris Brown).

He was featured on American rapper and model Rubi Rose's single "Hit Yo Dance" featuring NLE Choppa.

=== 2018 shooting ===
On October 14, 2018, Conway was shot on the Sam Rayburn Tollway in Lewisville, Texas at around 3:30 AM. Reports say that his vehicle was fired at 3 times. Conway was hospitalized and survived, while the shooter was never officially identified.

== Legal issues ==
Conway was arrested in Dallas on February 14, 2021, for possession of a firearm and was later released from jail on the same day he was booked. On August 11, 2021, the rapper was arrested again on drug charges.

Conway was arrested in Plano, Texas, on November 5, 2021, for charges of sexual assault and possession of a weapon. Later that year, the sexual abuse charges were dismissed.

On March 20, 2025, Conway was arrested by Dallas County Texas in connection with felony capital murder-for-hire charges of rapper MO3 in the State of Texas vs. Conway, Markies (Case #F-25-00154). A Dallas County grand jury would formally indict Conway on a murder charge which alleged that he hired a hitman to murder MO3, whose real name was Melvin Noble.

On September 4, 2026, a Dallas County jury found Kewon White, who was alleged to have been hired by Conway to carry out the murder of Noble, guilty of capital murder.

On November 11, 2026, Conway was found guilty of capital murder by a Dallas County jury in connection with the November 2020 killing of rapper MO3 (Melvin Noble). Prosecutors alleged that Conway hired Kewon White to carry out the killing, reportedly paying him $40,000. Conway was sentenced to life imprisonment without the possibility of parole.

== Discography ==
=== Mixtapes ===
Title	Details	Peak chart positions	
Title	Details	US	US R&B/HH
Lite Work	Released: October 7, 2016; Label: Pressplay; Format: Digital download, streaming	—	—
Broke Nights Rich Days	Released: February 3, 2017; Label: Pressplay; Format: Digital download, streaming	—	—
Lite Work, Vol. 2	Released: November 21, 2017; Label: Hitco; Format: Digital download, streaming	—	—
Ain't No Goin' Bacc	Released: November 16, 2018; Label: Hitco; Format: Digital download, streaming	76	37
Baccend Beezy	Released: July 19, 2019; Label: Hitco; Format: Digital download, streaming	91	43
I'm My Brother's Keeper (with Trapboy Freddy)	Released: May 8, 2020; Label: Hitco, 300; Format: Digital download, streaming	—	—
Bad Azz Yella Boy	Released: August 5, 2022; Label: Profit Music Group; Format: Digital download, streaming	—	—

=== Singles ===
==== As lead artist ====
List of singles as lead artist, with selected chart positions, showing year released and album name
Title	Year	Peak chart positions				Certifications	Album
Title	Year	US	US R&B/HH	US Rap	US Main. R&B/HH	Certifications	Album
"Trap in Designer"	2015	—	—	—	—		Broke Nights Rich Days
"Goin Through Some Thangs"	2016	—	—	—	—		Lite Work
"Favors"	2017	—	—	—	—		Lite Work, Vol. 2
"That's On Me" (solo or with 2 Chainz, T.I., Rich the Kid, Jeezy, Boosie Badazz, and Trapboy Freddy)	2017	56	26	23	3	RIAA: Gold	Ain't No Goin' Bacc
"Up One" (solo or remix featuring Lil Baby)	2018	—	—	—	29		Ain't No Goin' Bacc
"Bacc At It Again" (with Quavo and Gucci Mane)	2019	78	30	24	6	RIAA: Gold	Baccend Beezy
"Rich MF"	2019	—	—	—	—		Non-album single
"Restroom Occupied" (with Chris Brown)	2019	— (Note: "Restroom Occupied" did not enter the Hot 100, but peaked at number 9 on the Bubbling Under Hot 100.)	—	—	9		Baccend Beezy
"Ay Ya Ya Ya" (featuring Ty Dolla Sign)	2019	—	—	—	—		TBA
"Headlocc" (featuring Young Thug)	2020	—	—	—	11		TBA
"Solid" (featuring 42 Dugg)	2020	—	—	—	—		TBA
"On Fleek" (featuring Gunna)	2020	—	—	—	—		TBA
