= DJ Suede the Remix God =

American producer

- Also known as: Remix God Suede
- Born: Keenan Maurice Webb; November 14, 1990 (age 35); Douglas, Georgia, U.S.
- Genres: Hip-hop; trap
- Occupations: Record producer; songwriter
- Label: Empire

Keenan Maurice Webb (born November 14, 1990), also known as DJ Suede the Remix God (or simply Remix God Suede), is an American hip-hop record producer and songwriter.

== Early life and career ==
Keenan Maurice Webb was born on November 14, 1990, in Douglas, Georgia, where he also was raised. He kickstarted his interest in production at the age of 12, working on beats and remixes in his spare time. After graduating college, he gained attention on Vine, achieving a viral post with his remix of an iPhone 6 ringtone, which was shared across numerous social media platforms. Since the first viral remix, Webb has consistently released remix-after-remix, sampling familiar sounds or pop culture references.

== Career ==
Suede peaked at fame in late-2016 and early-2017 when he earned himself three charting Billboard songs, with "You Name It!," a Thanksgiving theme song which sampled vocals from the "Hold My Mule" sermon sung by Pastor Shirley Caesar, and received heavy promotion from Chris Brown to be turned into the #UNameIt challenge, "I Got Skills," a collaboration with the Backpack Kid, Russell Horning, and his most popular, "Cash Me Outside," which spent three weeks on the Hot 100, peaking at number 72. His other notable non-charting songs include a remix of "You About To Lose Yo Job" by Eklectik, in collaboration with IMarkkeyz. The video was originally created by Johnniqua Charles during a video of her being arrested at a nightclub by a security guard. The remix became a popular meme used during 2020 Black Lives Matter movements and the 2020 United States presidential election and was used on a skit on Saturday Night Live to mock Donald Trump's loss to Joe Biden.

Since going viral, Suede has produced music for YoungBoy Never Broke Again, Young Thug, Migos, 2 Chainz, Megan Thee Stallion, and Juicy J, to name a few.

== Discography ==
=== Instrumental albums ===
Title	Album details
Remix God Suede Instrumentals, Vol. 1	Released: January 27, 2019; Label: Self-released; Format: Digital download, streaming
Lofi Vibez, Vol. 1	Released: September 12, 2022; Label: Self-released; Format: Digital download, streaming
Instrumental Tape, Vol. 1	Released: December 11, 2022; Label: Self-released; Format: Digital download, streaming
Respect the Hustle Vol. 1 Instrumentals	Released: April 13, 2023; Label: Self-released; Format: Digital download, streaming

=== Charted singles ===
List of singles (Note: Only charting singles are listed here.)
Title	Year	Peak chart positions			Album
Title	Year	US	US R&B /HH	CAN	Album
"You Name It!" (featuring Shirley Caesar)	2016	— (Note: "You Name It!" did not enter the Hot 100, but peaked at number 15 on the Bubbling Under Hot 100 extension chart.)	—	—	Non-album singles
"I Got Skills" (featuring Russell Got Barzz)	2016	— (Note: "I Got Skills" did not enter the Hot 100, but peaked at number 4 on the Bubbling Under Hot 100 extension chart.)	—	—	Non-album singles
"Cash Me Outside"	2017	72	30	79	Non-album singles
