= Brittany B. =

American songwriter from California

- Also known as: Bee-B
- Born: Brittany Chikyra Barber; Compton, California, U.S.
- Genres: Hip hop; R&B
- Occupations: Songwriter; singer
- Years active: 2011–present
- Label: ONErpm
- Website: brittanybmusic.com

Brittany Chikyra Barber is an American singer and songwriter from Compton, California. She released her debut mixtape, AfterHours and its follow-up, HelloSummer, both in 2016. As a songwriter, she has been credited on singles and albums for artists including Ghostface Killah, Queen Naija, Chris Brown, Chrisette Michele, John Legend, YG, Kash Doll, Tyla Yaweh, Eric Bellinger, and Ledisi, among others. She has co-written the songs "No Interruptions" by Chris Brown, "Let Love Rule" by Ledisi, and several for Bhad Bhabie.

In 2019, Barber was featured in the sixth season of Love and Hip Hop: Hollywood as a recurring cast member, and made crossover appearances on the tenth season of Love & Hip Hop: Atlanta. She also co-starred in the 2023 BET film IMANI.

== Early life ==
Brittany B. was born and raised in Compton, California, United States. She has two younger brothers. She attended Centennial High School and played basketball. She began singing at a young age in church choir, which sparked her interest in becoming a singer.

== Musical career ==
Barber got her start performing background vocals at local venues in Hollywood, California. She then met Terrace Martin, who took notice of her budding talent. She worked on his Locke High 2 album, contributing backing vocals to its songs "Love", "Lithium", and "We Just Keep it Hood". She then began gaining recognition in Los Angeles.

In 2014, Barber signed a publishing deal with Spirit Music Group after co-writing the song "Can't Stop" by Theophilus London featuring Kanye West. Afterward, she began touring with Chrisette Michele for the latter's "Lyricist Opus" tour, and guest appeared on the reality show R&B Divas LA. In 2016, she began working on respective albums for Ledisi and John Legend. In 2021, she signed with Ultra Publishing.

On February 14, 2016, Barber released the mixtape AfterHours. The following month, she signed with Empire Distribution. Barber released the extended play HelloSummer on Independence Day of that year. Due to the success of her solo EP's, Barber began working on her debut studio album. During this time, she received film and television syncs on shows such as FX's Atlanta and TV One's Bad Dad Rehab film. She continued writing and received a call from an executive at Warner Music Group to begin working with Danielle Bregoli. Barber co-wrote her first single, "These Heaux", which debuted at number 77 on the Billboard Hot 100, making Bhad Bhabie the youngest female rap artist to enter on the chart.

Barber starred in the sixth season of Love & Hip Hop: Hollywood as a recurring cast member, and made crossover appearances on the tenth season of Love & Hip Hop: Atlanta. The season primarily focused on her career and rivalry with Lyrica Anderson, among other members. One such conflict is Barber's estranged relationship with her drug addicted mother. Barber also uttered the line: "You said it was on sight", which went viral online.

In 2022, Barber served as a music supervisor for AMC/ALLBLK's show Á La Carte, for its first two seasons. Barber scored and composed music for this series, which performed well with the network earned a renewal in 2023. She also composed music for the film Family Portrait on the AMC network as well.

In 2022, Barber signed with ONErpm as a recording artist and adopted the stage name Bee-B. She released her album Ghetto Feng Shui in November 2022, which peaked at number 100 on the R&B iTunes charts. In 2023, she won Best R&B Album at the 65th Annual Grammy Awards for her work on Robert Glasper's Black Radio III.

== Discography ==
=== Studio albums ===
- Ghetto Feng Shui (as Bee-B) (2022)
- Villain Origin Story (as Bee-B) (2025)

=== Extended plays ===
- AfterHours (2016)
- HelloSummer (2016)
- Finally (2016)
- Urban Nostalgia (2018)

== Songwriting discography ==
- "No Interruptions" – Chris Brown
- "Perfect Stranger" – Ledisi ft. Kenny Latimore
- "Impala" – Iyla ft. Symba
- "Out of My Hands" – Robert Glasper ft. Jennifer Hudson
- "Shine" – Elaine
- "I'm Her" – Queen Naija ft. Kiana Ledé
- "No Lames" – Kash Doll ft. Summer Walker
- "Headline" – Eric Bellinger ft. Kehlani
- "Let Love Rule" – Ledisi
- "Give You More" – Ledisi ft. John Legend
- "Spaz" – Bhad Bhabie ft. YBN Nahmir
- "Adderall" – Tyla Yaweh
- "Wraith Skating" – Tyla Yaweh ft. PnB Rock
- "Mama Don't Worry (Still Ain't Dirty)" – Bhad Bhabie
- "Geek'd" – Bhad Bhabie ft. YG
- "These Heaux" – Bhad Bhabie
- "Bad Chick" – FX's Atlanta TV Show (2016)
- "Shadow Of A Doubt" – Freddie Gibbs (2015)
- "Who Knows" & "Whatcha Think About" – Jovanie (2015)
- "Sex You" – Lyrica Anderson ft. Wiz Khalifa (2015)
- "Make Us One" – Chrisette Michelle
- "Can't Stop" – Theophilus London ft. Kanye West (2014)
