= Unfuccwitable =

Mixtape by Asian Da Brat
- Released: May 3, 2019
- Recorded: 2018
- Genre: Hip hop
- Length: 36:51
- Label: 1017 Eskimo; Alamo
- Producer: SK Beats; Tasha Catour; YUNG GLIZZY; Antwain Fox; Cartier Sosa; Zillasuper; KashBeats; Ameen Shakir; Take a Daytrip; BeatsByJeff; Bankroll Got It; DJ Moon; Dupri; Extendo; Yung Lan; OG Parker; 1Mind; Tee Romano; CVRE

Asian Da Brat chronology
So Icy Princess (2018)	Unfuccwitable (2019)	Fight Night (2019)

Unfuccwitable (stylized in all caps) is the seventh mixtape by American rapper Asian Doll, released under her "Asian Da Brat" moniker. It serves as the only mixtape released under the Asian Da Brat name. It was released on May 3, 2019 by 1017 Eskimo and Alamo Records. The mixtape features guest verses from Smooky MarGielaa, Stunna 4 Vegas, Calboy, PnB Meen, Yung Mal, Smokepurpp and Lil Durk.

== Singles ==
"Grandson," with a video starring King Von, was released as a promotional single on December 17, 2018.

"Draco" featuring Smokepurpp was released as the mixtape's lead single on April 24, 2019.

"Tweakin" was released as the mixtape's second single on May 1, 2019.

== Track listing ==
Credits adapted from Qobuz.

No.	Title	Writer(s)	Producer(s)	Length
1.	"Proud of Me" (featuring Smooky MarGielaa)	Misharron Allen; Dustin John Martin; Toumani Diabate	SK Beats	2:12
2.	"Eskimo Flow"	Allen; Tasha Catour	Allen; Catour	2:03
3.	"Tweakin"	Allen; Martin	SK Beats	2:27
4.	"I Love It" (featuring Stunna 4 Vegas)	Allen; Khalick Antonio Caldwell; Antwain Fox	YUNG GLIZZY; Fox; Cartier Sosa	3:27
5.	"Superman" (featuring Calboy)	Allen; Calvin Woods, Jr.; Issac Smith; Kingsley Izenwata	ZillaSuper; KashBeats	2:47
6.	"Gucci Clothes" (featuring Pnb Meen)	Allen; Martin; Ameen Shakir	SK Beats; Shakir	2:33
7.	"Double Burger"	Allen; Denzel Baptiste; David Biral	Take a Daytrip	3:01
8.	"Grandson"	Allen; Martin	SK Beats	3:07
9.	"Geek'd" (featuring Yung Mal)	Allen; Jamal Braud	BeatsByJeff	2:13
10.	"Shhhh"	Allen; Matthew Banks; Joel Banks; Taylor Banks	Bankroll Got It	2:08
11.	"Draco" (featuring Smokepurpp)	Allen; Omar Pineiro; Martin; Corey Moon	DJ Moon	2:44
12.	"You FU"	Allen; Regis Bell; Mike Crook; Spencer Anderson	Dupri; Extendo	2:19
13.	"Traumatized (Remix)" (featuring Lil Durk)	Allen; Durk Banks; Milan Modi	Yung Lan	3:04
14.	"Did for the Streets Freestyle"	Allen; Banks; Joshua Parker; McCulloch Sutphin; Terrence Williams; Jun Ha Kim	OG Parker; 1Mind; Tee Romano; CVRE	2:46
Total length:				36:51
