= These Heaux =

Single by Bhad Bhabie
- Released: August 24, 2017
- Recorded: 2017
- Genre: Hip-hop; trap
- Length: 2:20
- Label: Atlantic
- Songwriters: Danielle Bregoli; Armando Hernandez; Brittany Barber; Larry Jacks Jr.
- Producer: Mando Fresh

Bhad Bhabie singles chronology
"Cash Me Outside" (2017)	"These Heaux" (2017)	"Hi Bich" (2017)

Music video
- "These Heaux" on YouTube

"These Heaux" (pronounced "these hoes") is the debut solo single recorded by American rapper Bhad Bhabie. It was released on August 24, 2017, as the rapper's debut single and she subsequently became the youngest female rapper to have a single debut on the Billboard Hot 100, after the song peaked at number 77.

== Background ==
The song debuted on the US Billboard Hot 100 chart at number 77 in the week of September 23, 2017. It also made Bhabie the third-youngest solo artist of all time to chart on the Hot 100, behind JoJo and Stevie Wonder. Learning about her song's chart position on Spotify just a spot below Taylor Swift's much more publicized "Look What You Made Me Do" in streaming services, Bhabie told TMZ "[Swift's] someone who's been well-known for a long time and I'm someone who's just getting into the music game, and it's kinda crazy how I can just be one below her." The song also appeared to reference rapper Tyga and his repossessed Maybach vehicle as well as her father.

The song's title originates from the -eaux suffix as the plural form of nouns ending in -eau in the French language and is also a common ending for historically Louisiana Cajun surnames like Boudreaux and Thibodeaux.

== Music video ==
The official music video, directed by Good Boy Shady, was posted to Bhabie's YouTube channel on August 30, 2017. In the video, Bhabie cruises around the streets of Venice, California, mocking her "haters" who protest. A lookalike of Kylie Jenner appeared in the video.

== Charts ==
Chart (2017–2018)	Peak position
Canada Hot 100 (Billboard)	57
US Billboard Hot 100	77
US Hot R&B/Hip-Hop Songs (Billboard)	34

== Certifications ==
Region	Certification	Certified units/sales
United States (RIAA)	Gold	500,000^{‡}
^{‡} Sales+streaming figures based on certification alone.
