= Boudreaux =

Boudreaux is a surname of French origin and is a common name among Cajuns. Notable people with the surname include:

- Donald J. Boudreaux (born 1958), American professor of law and economics
- Gail Koziara Boudreaux (born 1960), American businesswoman in the healthcare industry
- John Boudreaux (1936–2017), American drummer
- John "Buddy" Boudreaux (1917–2015), American big band and jazz musician from Baton Rouge, Louisiana
- Monk Boudreaux (born 1941), American chief of the Mardi Gras Indians in Louisiana
- Parker Boudreaux (born 1998), American professional wrestler
- Randy Boudreaux, American country-music songwriter and producer

== Fictional characters ==
- Bella Donna Boudreaux, an assassin in the Marvel Comics's X-Men

== See also ==
- Boudreaux's Butt Paste, an American skin cream that started out as a diaper rash remedy
- Boudreaux and Thibodeaux, traditional Cajun jokes
- Boudreau
