= Asian Doll =

American rapper (born 1996)

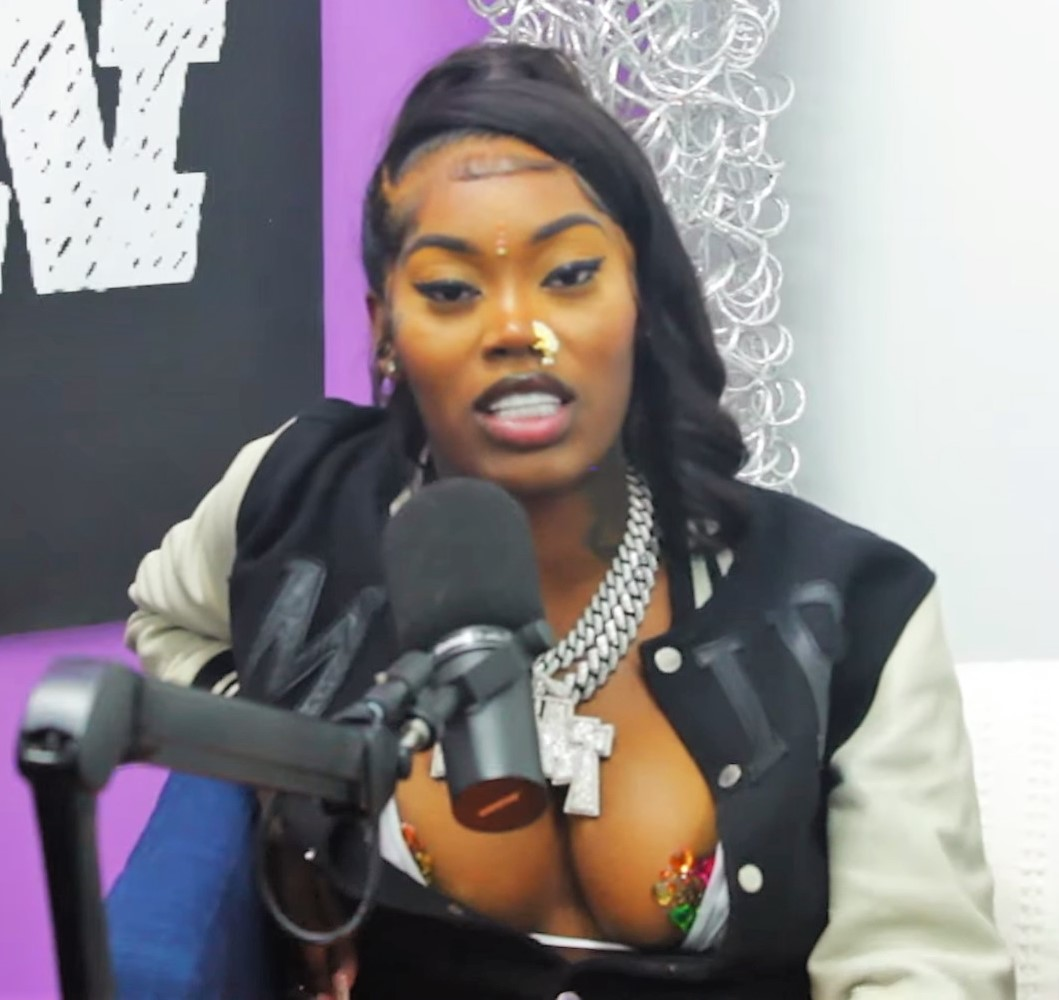
- Asian Doll in 2022

Background information
- Also known as: Asian Da Brat
- Born: Misharron Jermeisha Allen; December 7, 1996 (age 29)
- Origin: Dallas, Texas, U.S.
- Genres: Hip-hop; trap; drill
- Occupation: Rapper
- Years active: 2015–present
- Labels: Doll Gang; 1017 Eskimo; Alamo
- Partner: King Von (2018; died 2020)

Mi'Sharron Jermeisha Allen (born December 7, 1996), known professionally as Asian Doll (also known as Asian Da Brat, or simply Asian), is an American rapper. A Dallas native, she was the first female artist to sign with Gucci Mane's 1017 Eskimo Records.

== Early life ==
Allen was born on December 7, 1996, to LaKeithia Lewis and Michael Allen, and was the second daughter of four children. Raised in the south side of Dallas in an area known as Park Row, Allen's family struggled with poverty and her father was in and out of prison. Allen had her first run-in with the law when she was 12 years old. Allen attended Skyline High School and dropped out in the 12th grade.

== Career ==
=== Career beginnings ===
Her music career began with the release of Da Rise of Barbie Doll Gang Empire on December 16, 2015 and the attention from Black-owned social media blogs. Other projects include Drippin in Glo (2016), Project Princess Vol. 1 (2016), OuttaSpace (2017), Kill Bill, Vol. 1 (2017), and Doll SZN (2018).

On June 13, 2018, Allen became the first female artist signed to Gucci Mane's 1017 Eskimo Records. Her first project with 1017 was So Icy Princess (2018). In 2019, Allen went on to release her eighth and ninth mixtapes, UNFUCCWITABLE and Fight Night.

In January 2020, Allen left her contract with 1017. On April 8, 2020, Allen released Doll SZN Reloaded, her first independently released project since signing with 1017. Allen became a company owner.

=== 2022–2023: Let's Do a Drill and Let's Do a Drill 2 ===
On July 22, 2022, Asian Doll released her album Let's Do a Drill. The 20-track project brings in features from fellow drill rappers Bandmanrill, 2rare, Dsturdy, TaTa, Iffy Foreign, Big TG, YBC Frizzy, EBK Dada, Dougie B, Shani Boni, Mula Gzz, Ivorian Doll, Kyle Richh, Jenn Carter, Miah Kenzo, Sosa Geek, Velly Osama, and Bory3000. Asian Doll also collaborated with fellow Texas-born rapper Tay Money on Down South.

On November 7, 2022, Asian Doll released the single Come Outside prior to releasing her tenth mixtape. The mixtape, Let's Do a Drill 2 was released on February 24, 2023. Also known as, Let's Do a Drill 2: Solo Edition, the project contains features on only one of its 12 tracks.

=== Television ===
She was cast in the Zeus Network reality show, Baddies season 5 (Baddies Caribbean).

== Public image ==
In an attempt to distance herself from a group of female rappers using the stage name Doll, Allen changed her name to Asian Da Brat in 2019. The name Asian Da Brat was supposedly a reference to the veteran female rapper from Chicago, Da Brat, whose debut studio album Funkdafied was the first platinum-certified record by a female rapper. In an April 2019 interview on Hot97, Allen stated that Da Brat was a reference to the brand of girls' toys known as Bratz Dolls.

== Personal life ==
In January 2021, Allen opened up about suffering depression due to the death of King Von, with whom she was in an on-and-off relationship before his death. A few days later, she appeared on an episode of Taraji P. Henson's show Peace of Mind with Taraji to discuss his death. Allen has five tattoos dedicated to Von. In 2025, Allen gave birth to a daughter. She got engaged on December 7, 2025. On June 25, 2026, Allen announced that she is pregnant with her second child.

=== Legal issues ===
In June 2018, Allen was arrested in New York City after getting into a fight. She was released a few hours later.

On September 4, 2020, Allen was arrested in Georgia, U.S., on drug charges. She was released on bond four days later.

In October, 2022, Allen was once again arrested in Douglas County, Georgia, due to failing to appear for the charges stemming from her September 2020 arrest as well as driving 20 miles per hour over the posted speed limit and not having a valid Texas driver's license.

== Discography ==
=== Studio albums ===
- Let's Do a Drill (2022)
- Let's Do a Drill 2 (2023)
- Da Hardest Doll (2024)

=== Mixtapes ===
- Da Rise of Barbie Doll Gang Empire (2015)
- Drippin in Glo (2016)
- Project Princess Vol. 1 (2016)
- Outtaspace (2017)
- Kill Bill, Vol. 1 (2017)
- Doll SZN (2018)
- So Icy Princess (2018)
- Unfuccwitable (2019, as Asian Da Brat)
- Fight Night (2019)

=== Extended plays ===
- Doll SZN Reloaded (2020)

=== Singles ===
As lead artist
2016

- "No Flockin Remix"
- "Poppin" (feat. PnB Rock)
- "Barbie Everywhere"

2017

- "Road Runner"
- "Bless"
- "Chun-Li Challenge"

2018

- "Savage Barbie"
- "So Icy Princess Intro"
- "1017" (feat. Gucci Mane & Yung Mal)
- "First Off"

2019

- "Grandson"
- "Draco (feat. Smokepurpp)
- "Tweakin'
- "Fleek"
- "Cravin (feat. Yella Beezy)
- "Stank Walk"
- "Truth"

2020

- "Come Find Me"
- "Open Heart"
- "Pull Up" (feat. King Von)
- "Nunnadet Shit"

2021

- "Back In Blood"
- "Twice"
- "Nunnadet Shit (Remix)" (feat. DreamDoll, Rubi Rose, Dreezy & Ivorian Doll)
- "Don't Let Me Go"
- "No Exposing"

2022

- "Viral"
- "Baby" (feat. Sheemy)
- "Fell In Love"
- "Talk Facts" (feat. Sheemy & Mula Gzz)
- "To The Moon Freestyle"
- "Get Jumped" (feat. Bandmanrill)
- "Obsessed" (feat. Sheemy)
- "Motherless Child"
- "Prettiest Problem" (feat. DAMU UP)
- "Come Outside"
- "Sky Falling"

2023

- "Fix Up"
- "Where the Fun N****s At?"
- "Together Forever"
- "Mama Freestyle"
- "Beef With Me"
- "Cant Hang"

2024

- "Standing On Business" (with Cuban Doll)
- "F****d Who?"
- "Love Me" (feat. EKT 40 & 2rare)
- "Choppaz" (with PD DASHMAN)
- "Where the Fun N****s At? Remix" (feat. Gloss Up)

2025

- "Crash Out"

As featured artist
2018

- "Serena Williams" (Manny Baby feat. Asian Doll)
- "Hi Bich (Remix)" (Bhad Bhabie feat. YBN Nahmir or MadeinTYO and Rich The Kid)
- "Next to Me" (Cash Kidd feat. Asian Doll)
- "My N****s" (Oblock Gunz feat. Asian Doll)
- "Gangsta" (Honey Oso feat. Cuban Doll & Asian Doll)
- "Double Back" (YBN Nahmir feat. Asian Doll and Cuban Doll)
- "Move Ova" (ILuvMuny feat. Asian Doll)
- "Affiliated" (Bhad Bhabie feat. Asian Doll)

2019

- "With You " (Jay Sean & Gucci Mane)
- "Wigs" (A$AP Ferg feat. City Girls)
- "Fire Right There" (9lokkNine)

2020

- "Tour" (Blueface feat. NLE Choppa, 9lokkNine Sada Baby and Kiddo Curry)
- "Twerk War" (Six3 feat. Asian Doll)
- "Das Me" (Big Mali feat. Asian Doll)
- "Let Her" (PnB Meen feat. Asian Doll)
- "BLUE FACE" (Jay Gwuapo feat. Asian Doll)
- "WHAT IT DO" (Action Pack feat. Asian Doll)

2021

- "Doom" (Blac Chyna featuring Asian Doll)
- "We Da Opps" (Casino Jizzle feat. Asian Doll)
- "IRDGAF" (GSAMBO feat. Asian Doll)
- "Queen Of The Trap" (Million Dollar Mag feat. Asian Doll )
- "Life of a Hitta" ($hyfromdatre feat. Asian Doll)
- "Back to Back" (NCG Kenny B feat. Asian Doll)
- "Fish Tank" (Millyz feat. Asian Doll)

2022

- "Occasion" (Jenn Carter feat. Asian Doll)
- "Shake Dat" (Miah Kenzo feat. Asian Doll)
- "Don't Breathe Remix" (EBK Dada feat. YBC Frizzy and Asian Doll)
- "He Ain't Mine" (Kelow LaTesha feat. Asian Doll)
- "Slangin Iron" (BC Jay feat. Asian Doll)
- "Child's Play" (Dee Billz feat. TaTa & Asian Doll)

2023

- "Upside/Down (Asian Doll Remix)" (Elia Berthoud feat. Asian Doll)
- "Dat Knocka" (Leeky Jack feat. Asian Doll)
- "With The Mandem (Top5 feat. WhyG & Asian Doll)
- "Hit'em with Precision" (Seven-O Beretta feat. Asian Doll, Vex Grant & Kloudy)
- "Say Day" (Pablo Domo feat. Asian Doll)

2024

- "Not You" (Ty Uzi feat. Asian Doll & Klass Murda)
- "Ran Down" (Leek Lavell feat. Asian Doll)
