= Adam Kluger =

American music manager

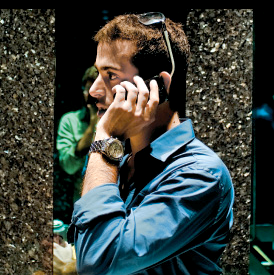
- Occupation: Advertising executive / Music Manager
- Website: Kluger Companies homepage

Adam Kluger is an American music manager, and the founder and CEO of the Kluger Agency, an agency that arranges product placements in music videos and on musical recordings.

== Early life ==
Kluger grew up in Tampa, Florida. Between 2004 and 2006 Kluger attended Santa Fe College in Gainesville, Florida and attended a certificate program in music business and production in Los Angeles, taking classes on topics including royalties and audio engineering. In 2008 he formed his own boutique advertising firm, focusing on product placement in music videos and song recordings called the Kluger Agency.

== Career ==
Kluger's first client was Interscope Records, who hired Kluger to find placement for the artist Lady Gaga for one of her first music videos, before her album The Fame launched the artist's career. Kluger placed the brand Vixen's Visions at the tail end of the video "Beautiful, Dirty, Rich". His next placement was for the brand Drank in a series of hip hop videos. The success of his business plan caused some controversy among music industry observers. A Wired magazine blog, for example, criticized the concept of having artists paid for using brand names in their songs, writing that if an artist chooses to use product names in their songs they should not be compensated.

Kluger works out of his offices in Los Angeles. In addition to being CEO of his own company, he manages musical artists individually. While not all of Kluger's clients are known, it was reported that his clients have included Lady Gaga, Kesha, Britney Spears, and Jennifer Lopez, in addition to artists like Christina Aguilera, Beyoncé and Eminem.

Kluger is also responsible for discovering and managing controversial social media star Bhad Bhabie, who signed a multimillion-dollar recording contract with Atlantic Records in 2017. She currently holds the record as the youngest female rapper of all time to chart on the Billboard Hot 100, and has subsequently reached multi-platinum sales status. His work has been used as a case study in several books and articles on music marketing.

In 2012 Forbes named Kluger one of their 30 most influential people in the music industry under the age of 30, citing that he brought in more than five million dollars a year in net revenues. The magazine has also interviewed Kluger in response to current events pertaining to the music and entertainment industries, as has Us Weekly. He had previously been nominated for the Billboard 30 under 30 in the music industry in 2011.

In 2019 Kluger launched Nontra Records, an independent record label and management company that manages several musical acts such as Lil Yachty and Bhad Bhabie. In 2021 Kluger launched Scoop Investments which together with his celebrity clients made its first investment of US$1 Million into Jewish dating app Lox Club. In 2021 Variety listed Kluger as one of the new leaders of Hollywood in its annual Hollywood New Leaders List

In 2025 Kluger launched Run Fast Racing, a celebrity horse racing venture along with partners Lil Wayne, Rauw Alejandro, and Lil Yachty. The company owns racehorses that compete in the USA.
