= Floss (dance) =

Dance move and Internet meme

- A 2018 GIF of a man doing the floss
- Etymology: Back-and-forth movement is similar to the use of dental floss
- Year: 2010s–present
- Origin: United States

The floss is a dance and an Internet meme in which a person repeatedly swings their arms, with clenched fists, from the back of their body to the front, on alternating sides.

== Etymology ==
The name comes from the moves themselves, which involve "a lot of fast arms and hip swings as though using a huge, invisible piece of dental floss".

== History ==
An earlier instance of the dance being promoted on the internet was in a 2014 clip uploaded by the YouTube channel JStuStudios, run by content creators Justin Stewart and Andrew Scites. Stewart and Scites have performed the dance, called "The Squeege" in televised appearances, such as The Meredith Vieira Show. The earliest instance of the dance was published October 18, 2010 by the YouTube channel Ryan Mayall (MayAllLove13). Videos of the dance on social media achieved viral popularity after 14-year-old Russell Horning, known as "the backpack kid", performed the dance in an August 2016 video. Horning was invited to participate in a live Saturday Night Live performance of Katy Perry's song "Swish Swish" in May 2017. It has since become a trend among children and younger teens, and has been performed by celebrities in videos. The floss has been featured in The Simpsons, and in television shows airing on virtually every major children's television channel.

Flossing was featured in the 2017 video game Fortnite Battle Royale by Epic Games, as an emote that can be performed by the player's in-game character and was a limited-time reward in Battle Pass Season 2. Flossing became popular in schools due to the popularity of Fortnite. It was approved by various parents and administrators, being considered inoffensive. In December 2018, Horning's mother filed a lawsuit against Epic Games for copyright infringement of the dance. In response, Playground Games removed a similar dance emote in their 2018 racing video game Forza Horizon 4, to avoid possible litigation.
