= Hi Bich =

Single by Bhad Bhabie

from the album 15
- Released: September 22, 2017
- Recorded: 2017
- Genre: Hip-hop; trap
- Length: 1:44
- Label: Atlantic
- Songwriters: Danielle Bregoli; Ronald Spence, Jr.; Nicholaus Williams; James Lavigne
- Producer: Ronny J

Bhad Bhabie singles chronology
"These Heaux" (2017)	"Hi Bich" (2017)	"Whachu Know" (2017)

Audio video
- "Hi Bich" on YouTube

Music video
- "Hi Bich / Whachu Know" on YouTube

"Hi Bich" (/haɪ bɪtʃ/ "hi, bitch") is a song by American rapper Bhad Bhabie. It was released on September 22, 2017, as the lead single from her debut mixtape 15, and it peaked at number 68 on the Billboard Hot 100 on October 21, 2017. The single went gold on March 28, 2018, and platinum on October 20, 2020. It was ranked 101st on The Fader's "101 Best Songs of 2017".

== Music video ==
The official music video, which was directed by Iqbal Ahmed was posted to Bhabie's YouTube channel on September 21, 2017. In the music video, Bhabie is shown as the defendant in a court case. Chaos breaks out in the court room, and in the next scene she is shown strapped into an electric chair and appears to be electrocuted. In the following scene, Bhabie is seen in a wedding dress in the back of a white Porsche being pulled by a white stallion. The video appears in the same upload as the music video for her next single, "Whachu Know". As of December 2024, the video has over 230 million views on YouTube.

== Remix ==
On February 1, 2018, a remix of Hi Bich was posted to WorldStarHipHop's official YouTube channel. The remix featured Rich the Kid, YBN Nahmir, and Asian Doll. The music video was originally intended to feature Nahmir, but he was removed from the video before its initial release due to a scheduling conflict and replaced with rapper MadeinTYO.

== Charts ==
Chart (2017–2018)	Peak position
Canada Hot 100 (Billboard)	66
US Billboard Hot 100	68
US Hot R&B/Hip-Hop Songs (Billboard)	29

== Certifications ==
Region	Certification	Certified units/sales
Canada (Music Canada)	Gold	40,000^{‡}
United States (RIAA)	Platinum	1,000,000^{‡}
^{‡} Sales+streaming figures based on certification alone.
