= Ray J discography =

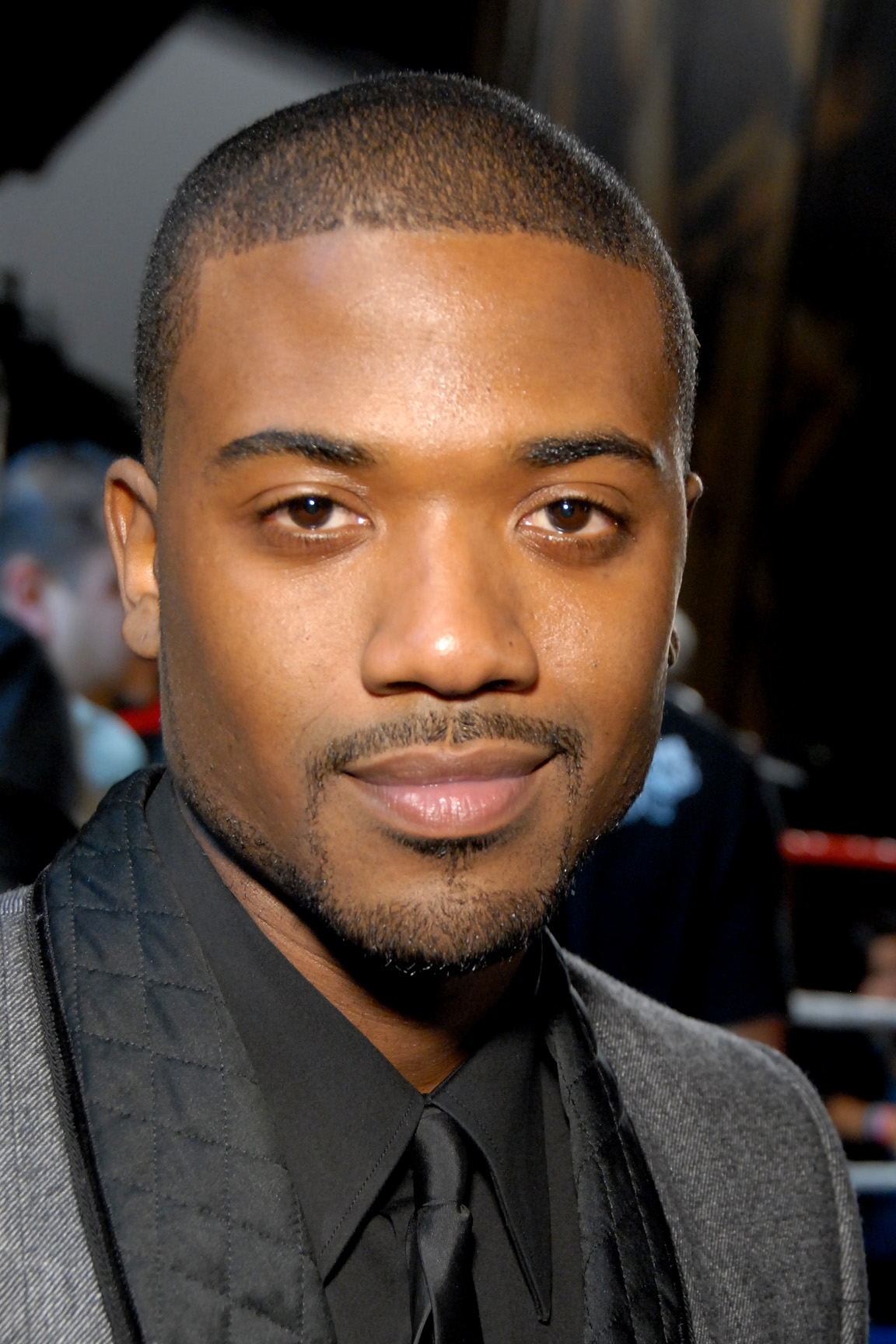
- Ray J in 2011
- Studio albums: 5
- Soundtrack albums: 2
- Compilation albums: 1
- Singles: 26
- Mixtapes: 2

This is the discography of R&B singer-songwriter Ray J.

== Albums ==
=== Studio albums ===
List of studio albums, with selected chart positions
Title	Album details	Peak chart positions			
Title	Album details	US	US Ind.	US R&B	UK
Everything You Want	Released: March 25, 1997; Label: Elektra, Asylum; Formats: CD, LP, cassette	—	—	56	—
This Ain't a Game	Released: June 19, 2001; Label: Knockout, Atlantic; Formats: CD, LP, cassette, digital download	21	—	9	—
Raydiation	Released: September 20, 2005; Label: Knockout, Sanctuary; Formats: CD, LP, cassette, digital download	48	—	13	144
All I Feel	Released: April 8, 2008; Label: Knockout, Deja34, Epic, Koch; Formats: CD, LP, digital download	7	1	1	—
Raydemption	Released: December 30, 2022; Label: Knockout; Formats: Streaming, digital download	—	—	—	—
"—" denotes a recording that did not chart or was not released in that territory.

=== Soundtrack albums ===
List of soundtrack albums, with selected chart positions
Title	Album details	Peak chart positions
Title	Album details	US R&B
For the Love of Ray J	Released: March 24, 2009; Label: Knockout, E1; Formats: CD, digital download	53
A Family Business	Released: June 19, 2011; Label: Saguaro Road, Time–Life, Knockout; Formats: CD, digital download	—

=== Visual albums ===
List of visual albums, with selected details
Title	Album details
Raydemption	Released: September 8, 2017; Label: Knockout

== Mixtapes ==
List of mixtapes, with selected information
Title	Album details
Smoke Cloud TMG & OHB (with The Mob Group)	Released: November 30, 2016; Label: TMG; Formats: Digital download
Burn My Name (with Chris Brown)	Released: June 19, 2017; Label: CBE, 916% Entertainment; Formats: Digital download

== EPs ==
List of extended plays, with selected information
Title	EP details
Progression	Released: December 18, 2018; Label: RU Listening, 17 Inc, Lookhu Inc.
Emerald City	Released: December 13, 2019; Label: XVII Inc; Format: Digital download, streaming

== Singles ==
=== As lead artist ===
List of singles as lead artist, with selected chart positions and certifications, showing year released and album name
Title	Year	Peak chart positions											Certifications	Album
Title	Year	US	US R&B	AUS	BEL (FL)	CAN	FRA	GER	NLD	NZ	SWI	UK	Certifications	Album
"Let It Go"	1997	25	17	85	—	—	—	—	—	10	—	—		Everything You Want
"Everything You Want"	1997	83	29	—	—	—	—	—	—	33	—	—		Everything You Want
"That's Why I Lie"	1998	—	—	—	—	—	—	—	—	22	—	71		Dr. Dolittle soundtrack
"Another Day in Paradise" (with Brandy)	2001	—	—	11	7	—	11	2	6	29	3	5	ARIA: Gold; BEA: Platinum; BVMI: Gold; IFPI SWI: Gold; SNEP: Silver; BPI: Silver	Urban Renewal
"Wait a Minute" (featuring Lil' Kim)	2001	30	8	—	—	—	—	72	75	—	80	54		This Ain't a Game
"Formal Invite" (featuring Pharrell)	2002	—	54	—	—	—	—	—	—	—	—	—		This Ain't a Game
"Keep Ya Head Up"	2002	—	— (Note: "Keep Ya Head Up" did not enter the Hot R&B/Hip-Hop Songs chart, but peaked at number seven on the Bubbling Under R&B/Hip-Hop Singles chart.)	—	—	—	—	—	—	—	—	—		This Ain't a Game
"One Wish"	2005	11	3	49	54	29	74	73	—	20	—	13		Raydiation
"What I Need"	2005	—	58	—	—	—	—	—	—	—	—	—		Raydiation
"Sexy Can I" (featuring Yung Berg)	2007	3	4	—	—	20	—	—	—	10	—	66	RIAA: Platinum; MC: Gold	All I Feel
"Gifts"	2008	—	65	—	—	—	—	—	—	—	—	—		All I Feel
"Sexy Ladies" (featuring Truth and Shorty Mack)	2009	—	71	—	—	—	—	—	—	—	—	—		For the Love of Ray J
"Can We Fall in Love?"	2009	—	—	—	—	—	—	—	—	—	—	—		For the Love of Ray J
"One Thing Leads to Another" (featuring Pitbull)	2010	—	—	—	—	—	—	—	—	—	—	—		Non-album singles
"Last Wish"	2010	—	54	—	—	—	—	—	—	—	—	—		Non-album singles
"Talk to Me" (with Willie Norwood and Brandy)	2011	—	—	—	—	—	—	—	—	—	—	—		A Family Business
"Turnin' Me On"	2011	—	—	—	—	—	—	—	—	—	—	—		A Family Business
"Bananaz" (featuring Rick Ross)	2011	—	63	—	—	—	—	—	—	—	—	—		Non-album singles
"I Hit It First" (featuring Bobby Brackins)	2013	51	11	—	—	—	—	—	—	—	—	132		Non-album singles
"Never Shoulda Did That"	2014	—	—	—	—	—	—	—	—	—	—	—		Non-album singles
"ATM" (featuring Dria and Migos)	2014	—	—	—	—	—	—	—	—	—	—	—		Non-album singles
"Brown Sugar" (featuring Lil Wayne)	2015	—	—	—	—	—	—	—	—	—	—	—		Non-album singles
"Curtains Closed"	2015	—	—	—	—	—	—	—	—	—	—	—		Non-album singles
"Be with You"	2016	—	—	—	—	—	—	—	—	—	—	—		Non-album singles
"Famous" (featuring Chris Brown)	2016	—	—	—	—	—	—	—	—	—	—	—		Non-album singles
"How Did I Know"	2017	—	—	—	—	—	—	—	—	—	—	—		Non-album singles
"Feeling Like Love" (featuring Kid Ink)	2018	—	—	—	—	—	—	—	—	—	—	—		Non-album singles
"Who You Came With" (featuring Chris Brown and Young M.A.)	2018	—	—	—	—	—	—	—	—	—	—	—		Non-album singles
"Think of Me"	2018	—	—	—	—	—	—	—	—	—	—	—		Non-album singles
"Melody"	2018	—	—	—	—	—	—	—	—	—	—	—		Non-album singles
"Right On Time" (featuring Flo Rida, Brandy and Designer Doubt)	2018	—	—	—	—	—	—	—	—	—	—	—		Non-album singles
"Progression"	2019	—	—	—	—	—	—	—	—	—	—	—		Progression EP
"Hallelujah" (featuring Snoop Dogg)	2019	—	—	—	—	—	—	—	—	—	—	—		Non-album single
"Rewind" (featuring Designer Doubt, Truth and Ironik)	2019	—	—	—	—	—	—	—	—	—	—	—		Progression EP
"Party's Over" (solo or featuring K. Michelle)	2020	—	—	—	—	—	—	—	—	—	—	—		Emerald City EP
"Hurt You"	2020	—	—	—	—	—	—	—	—	—	—	—		Raydiation X
"Wish" (with Mak Sauce)	2022	—	—	—	—	—	—	—	—	—	—	—		Non-album singles
"You" (with Kelly Anthony)	2023	—	—	—	—	—	—	—	—	—	—	—		Non-album singles
"On Top" (with Bobby Brackins & P-Lo )	2023	—	—	—	—	—	—	—	—	—	—	—		Non-album singles
"Throwing Stacks" (with Sukihana)	2024	—	—	—	—	—	—	—	—	—	—	—		Non-album singles
"—" denotes a recording that did not chart or was not released in that territory.

=== As featured artist ===
List of singles as featured artist, with selected chart positions and certifications, showing year released and album name
Title	Year	Peak chart positions					Certifications	Album
Title	Year	US	US Pop	US R&B	US Rap	US Rhyth.	Certifications	Album
"Beds" (Lil' Fizz featuring Ray J)	2007	—	—	—	—	—		Payday EP
"You Know Me" (2 Pistols featuring Ray J)	2008	—	—	—	—	38		Death Before Dishonor
"Keep It Playa" (Boss Hogg Outlawz featuring Ray J)	2008	—	—	— (Note: "Keep It Playa" did not enter the Hot R&B/Hip-Hop Songs chart, but peaked at number ten on the Bubbling Under R&B/Hip-Hop Singles chart, which acts as an extension to the Hot R&B/Hip-Hop Songs chart.)	—	—		Back by Blockular Demand: Serve & Collect II
"Tie Me Down" (New Boyz featuring Ray J)	2009	22	23	42	5	4	RIAA: Platinum	Skinny Jeans and a Mic
"Blockstars" (DJ Kayslay featuring Yo Gotti, Jim Jones, Busta Rhymes and Ray J)	2009	—	—	—	—	—		More Than Just a DJ
"Thug Luv" (DJ Kayslay featuring Maino, Papoose, Red Café and Ray J)	2010	—	—	— (Note: "Thug Luv" did not enter the Hot R&B/Hip-Hop Songs chart, but peaked at number 16 on the Bubbling Under R&B/Hip-Hop Singles chart.)	—	—		More Than Just a DJ
"143" (Bobby Brackins featuring Ray J)	2010	76	—	—	19	—	RIAA: Gold	Live Good .5
"All We Know" (DJ Absolut featuring Ace Hood, Ray J, Swizz Beatz, Bow Wow and Fat Joe)	2013	—	—	—	—	—		Non-album singles
"Baddest Chick" (Ian Carey & Doron featuring Ray J and Kardinal Offishall)	2013	—	—	—	—	—		Non-album singles
"Lit Again" (Trey Songz with Feather featuring NIA and Ray J)	2025	—	—	—	—	—		TBA
"—" denotes a recording that did not chart or was not released in that territory.

=== Promotional singles ===
List of promotional singles, showing year released and album name
Title	Year	Album
"Keep Sweatin'" (featuring Fat Joe)	2005	Raydiation
"Quit Actin'" (featuring Shorty Mack and R. Kelly)	2005	Raydiation
"WellsFargo" (featuring Knotch, Truth and Luvaboy TJ)	2016	Smoke Cloud
"Smoke Cloud" (featuring Lil Twist)	2016	Smoke Cloud
"Caddi (Real Life Playa)" (featuring Payso)	2016	Non-album singles
"Toast"	2017	Non-album singles

== Guest appearances ==
List of non-single guest appearances, with other performing artists, showing year released and album name
Title	Year	Other artist(s)	Album
"Ray J Prelude"	2001	none	Urban Renewal
"Bout It"	2001	Willie Norwood, Brandy	Bout It
"Have Thine Own Way"	2001	Willie Norwood	Bout It
"Die Without You"	2002	Brandy	Full Moon
"Let's Go"	2008	Styles P	Super Gangster (Extraordinary Gentleman)
"She Freaky"	2008	Unk, Blazed	2econd Season
"Sweat"	2009	DJ Drama, Fabolous, La the Darkman	Gangsta Grillz: The Album (Vol. 2)
"Peep'n Game"	2009	Tha Realest	Witness Tha Realest
"You Heard of Us"	2010	DJ Kayslay, Sheek Louch, Styles P	More Than Just a DJ
"Blockstars" (Remix)	2010	DJ Kayslay, Busta Rhymes, Sheek Louch, Rick Ross, Papoose, Cam'ron, Vado	More Than Just a DJ
"Breakfast in Bed"	2010	Dorrough	Get Big
"Remember When"	2010	Gucci Mane	The Appeal: Georgia's Most Wanted
"Call the Police"	2010	Twista	The Perfect Storm
"Ready to Roll"	2011	Shorty Mack, TKO	A Family Business
"Sorry Baby Daddy"	2017	Brianna Perry	N/A
"Curious"	2018	Daz Dillinger	Dazamataz

== Soundtracks ==
Year	Song	Film/TV series
1997	"Let It Go"	Set It Off
1998	"That's Why I Lie"	Dr. Dolittle
2005	"Quit Actin" (with R. Kelly & Shorty Mack)	Roll Bounce
2010	"Can We Fall in Love?"	For the Love of Ray J 2
2010	"Spotlight"	Island of Fantasy
2010	"The Business of Family" (with Brandy)	Brandy and Ray J: A Family Business

== Other songs ==
- 2016: "Cut It Out" (with Jay Sean)
