= Everything You Want =

Everything You Want may refer to:

- Everything You Want (film), a 2005 film aired on ABC Family
- Everything You Want (Ray J album)
  - "Everything You Want" (Ray J song)
- Everything You Want (Vertical Horizon album)
  - "Everything You Want" (Vertical Horizon song)
