= Sweet Sugar =

Sweet Sugar may refer to:

- Sweet Sugar, nickname of Bradley Pryce
- Sweet Sugar (film), 1972 women in prison film, starring Phyllis Davis and Ella Edwards
- "Sweet Sugar", 1980 song from The Sky's the Limit (The Dynamic Superiors album)
- "Sweet Sugar", 1995 song by Uriah Heep from Sea of Light (album)
- "Sweet Sugar", 2008 song by One Night Only from album Started a Fire

== See also ==
- Sweet (disambiguation)
- Sugar (disambiguation)
- Brown Sugar (disambiguation)
- Sweet Brown Sugar (disambiguation)
- Sugar Is Not Sweet, Thai film
