= For the Love of Ray J (album) =

Soundtrack album by Ray J
- Released: March 24, 2009
- Length: 46:13
- Labels: Knockout; E1
- Producers: Ray J (exec.); Keith Crouch; Warren G; DJ Montay; Mr. Lee; Poli Paul; Clarence "Doc Bob" Ross; Robert "Fastrack" Waters; Darryl Cooper; Will "June Official" Dicks; Larry Allen; Ron Holden; Noel "Detail" Fisher

Ray J chronology
All I Feel (2008)	For the Love of Ray J (2009)	A Family Business (2011)

Singles from For the Love of Ray J
- 1. "Sexy Ladies" Released: February 6, 2009

For the Love of Ray J is the soundtrack album from American R&B singer-songwriter Ray J's same-titled reality show. It was released on March 24, 2009, by Knockout Entertainment and E1 Music. The track "Keep It Playa" also appears on Boss Hogg Outlawz's second album, Back by Blockular Demand: Serve & Collect II and "She's Freaky" also appears on Unk's second album, 2econd Season. The first official single, and music video "Sexy Ladies" was released in April 2009.

== Critical reception ==
Professional ratings
Review scores
Source	Rating
Allmusic	2.5/5 stars
Artistdirect	3/5 stars

AllMusic editor Jon O'Brien found that "unsurprisingly, this official soundtrack to the series suggests the self-proclaimed Lothario still only has one thing on his mind, with an endless supply of seductive slow jams and drop-top anthems, packed with slicker than slick chat-up lines and suggestive come-ons that seem tailor-made for wooing the televised bevy of female admirers supposedly vying for his affections [...] For the Love of Ray J is nowhere near as cringe-worthy as his show of the same name, but despite its subject matter, it's an undeniably clichéd affair which lacks both passion and any genuine sense of emotion."

== Track listing ==
For the Love of Ray J track listing
No.	Title	Writer(s)	Producer(s)	Length
1.	"For the Love of Ray J"	Norwood, Jr.	Doc Bob	4:00
2.	"Sexy Ladies" (featuring TruthKO & Shorty Mack)	Owens; Norwood, Jr.; Kowlessar	Keith Crouch; Ray J	3:17
3.	"Crush" (featuring Warren G)	Griffin; Powel; Williams	Warren G	3:58
4.	"Paradise" (featuring TruthKO)	Kowlessar; Kowlessar	Fastrack	4:20
5.	"Sex in the Rain" (featuring Shorty Mack)	Norwood, Jr.; Kid Springs Owens	Doc Bob; Keith Crouch	4:46
6.	"She Freaky" (featuring Unk)	Humphrey; Jones; Platt; Roberson; Simmons	DJ Montay	3:50
7.	"Keep It Playa" (featuring Slim Thug & Boss Hogg Outlawz)	Carson; Riley; Thomas	Mr. Lee	3:59
8.	"She Got Me Like (Ahh Shit)" (featuring Bubba Sparxxx)	Jones; Mathis; Poli; Stamps	Poli Paul	3:35
9.	"Dirty Samantha" (featuring Shorty Mack)	Norwood, Jr.; Owens	Darryl Cooper	2:55
10.	"Good Times" (featuring Shorty Mack)	Norwood, Jr.; Owens	Ray J	4:08
11.	"Apocalypse Soul" (featuring Willie Norwood)	Norwood	Larry Allen; Ron Holden	3:39
12.	"Sexy Can I (Remix)" (featuring Sheek Louch)	Carraway; Fisher; Norwood, Jr.; Ward	Noel "Detail" Fisher	3:47

== Charts ==
Chart performance for For the Love of Ray J
Chart (2009)	Peak position
US Top R&B/Hip-Hop Albums (Billboard)	53
