= For the Love of Ray J season 1 =

For the Love of Ray J
- Season 1
- The cast of For the Love of Ray J
- Starring: Ray J
- No. of episodes: 12

Release
- Original network: VH1
- Original release: February 2 – April 27, 2009

Season chronology
- Next → Season 2

For the Love of Ray J was a dating show on VH1 that featured hip hop singer Ray J. The program had a format similar to Flavor of Love, I Love New York, and Rock of Love with Bret Michaels. One source noted that it would "be produced by the same geniuses" as those shows, 51 Minds. In reference to the series, Ray J said:

I've been in this game a long time... I've been with a lot of women but I'm ready to get out. I want to do this show to find a ride or die chick, a chick that makes me want to get out of the game.

The show, which premiered on February 2, 2009, followed Ray J and his entourage of female suitors to clubs in Los Angeles, to Las Vegas where they partied with his friends, and to Ray's childhood home where they met his family and older sister Brandy Norwood.

According to one commentator, the concept of the show involved pampering the contestants with "upscale trips throughout the series" and Ray J being "so in love" he had "already given participating girls names like Cashmere, Unique and Hot Cocoa."

== Contestants ==
Nickname	Real Name	Hometown	Age	Eliminated	Reason For Nickname
Cocktail	Joanna Hernandez^{[n]}	Sacramento, California	26	Winner	She works part-time as a cocktail waitress
Unique	Danielle Pastorino	Cleveland, Ohio	23	Runner-up	The girls felt that her personality was very unusual
Danger	Monica Leon	San Francisco, California	21	Episode 11^{[w4]}	She has a tattoo of a tiger on her face and Ray J felt that she was dangerous
Chardonnay	Christa Nolley	Atlanta, Georgia	22	Episode 8	Her favorite drink is Chardonnay
Feisty	Elizabeth Mendez	Miami, Florida	22	Episode 7	Her feisty personality
Cashmere	Leah Minor	Valencia, California	23	Episode 6^{[w3]}	Ray J thought she had nice skin so he said he wanted to wear her as a scarf
Lil Hood	Chelsey Fatula	Orlando, Florida	21	Episode 5^{[w2]}	The girls felt that she was a little hood, but in a cute way
Stacks	Summer Smith	Atlanta, Georgia	24	Episode 5^{[w]}	The girls said she had a big butt
Caviar	Elizabeth Ahmed	Kyiv, Ukraine	21	Episode 4	She was born and raised in Russia
Stilts	Sharee Caldwell	Northridge, California	26	Episode 3	She's very tall
Atomic Bomb	Jerri Vega	Brooklyn, New York	21	Episode 2	Ray J said her look was explosive
Genuine	Jillian Campbell	Chicago, Illinois	25	Episode 2	The girls felt that she was acting very genuine
Naturalle	Keyonna Patterson	Indianapolis, Indiana	24	Episode 1	Her breasts are all natural and Her name is Black Barbie
Hot Cocoa	Ja'Wanna Waddy	Brooksville, Florida	30	Episode 1	Ray J felt that she could warm him up inside

Contestant Notes

- ^{^[n]}Joanna "Cocktail" was on the first season of The Bad Girls Club. In episode 15, she was brought on the show and stayed for the remaining 7 episodes.
- ^{^[w]} Stacks withdrew from the competition because of family matters.
- ^{^[w2]} Lil' Hood left because she felt she was being disrespected.
- ^{^[w3]} Cashmere withdrew from the competition because she couldn't handle it anymore
- ^{^[w4]} Danger was asked to leave by Ray J because he feared for her health and safety, as well as that of himself and the other contestants.

== Call-out order ==
#	Contestants	Episodes									
#	Contestants	1	2	3	4	5	6	7	8	11	
1	Atomic Bomb	Danger	Danger	Chardonnay	Cashmere	Cashmere	Unique	Cocktail	Cocktail	Cocktail	Cocktail
2	Cashmere	Caviar	Cocktail	Cocktail	Chardonnay	Chardonnay	Danger	Chardonnay	Unique	Unique	Unique
3	Caviar	Cocktail	Chardonnay	Danger	Cocktail	Cocktail	Chardonnay	Danger	Danger	Danger	
4	Chardonnay	Unique	Feisty	Stacks	Danger	Danger	Feisty	Unique	Chardonnay		
5	Cocktail	Feisty	Unique	Unique	Feisty	Feisty	Cocktail	Feisty			
6	Danger	Atomic Bomb	Cashmere	Feisty	Lil' Hood	Unique	Cashmere				
7	Feisty	Lil' Hood	Stacks	Lil' Hood	Stacks	Lil' Hood					
8	Genuine	Stacks	Stilts	Cashmere	Unique	Stacks					
9	Hot Cocoa	Stilts	Lil' Hood	Caviar	Caviar						
10	Lil' Hood	Genuine	Caviar	Stilts							
11	Naturalle	Cashmere	Atomic Bomb								
12	Stacks	Chardonnay	Genuine								
13	Stilts	Naturalle									
14	Unique	Hot Cocoa									

The contestant won Ray J's love.
The contestant went on a group date with Ray J.
The contestant went on an individual date with Ray J.
The contestant was eliminated.
The contestant quit the competition.
The contestant won a date with Ray J, but was eliminated.
The contestant was eliminated at the beginning of the elimination ceremony.
The contestant won a date with Ray J, but quit the competition.
The contestant was going to receive a glass, but quit the competition.
The contestant lost a challenge, but got to join the winning team on the date due to Ray J's choice.
The contestant was eliminated outside of the elimination ceremony.

- Episode 4 Ray J told the girls that everyone was safe except Caviar; names are alphabetical.
- Episode 5 Because Stacks and Lil Hood quit, Ray J did not eliminate any of the remaining girls; names are alphabetical.
- Episode 6 Ray J told Cashmere that she could pick up the glass if she wanted to stay, but she could not handle the pressure and left.
- Episode 9 Ray J said that he needed to meet the girls' parents before he could make a decision.
- Episode 10 was a recap episode.
- Episode 11 Ray J decided to eliminate Unique and he chose to pick Cocktail.
- Episode 12 This was a reunion show. Ray J and Cocktail are going to try to maintain a relationship.

== Episodes ==
=== A Tall Glass of Chardonnay ===
First aired February 2, 2009

Multi-platinum hip-hop artist Ray J has traveled the world and lived the life of a superstar, but now he's ready to find true love. 14 lovely women join Ray at an exclusive concert in Hollywood where Ray performs his hit single "Sexy Can I". After the stunning performance, they are whisked away to Ray J's palatial mansion and treated to a sumptuous dinner, as well as more and more drinks. After one-on-one interviews marked by stripper splits, drunkenness and tears, Ray sends two of the girls home.

— VH1 episode summary

- Bottom Three: Naturalle, Hot Cocoa, Chardonnay
- Eliminated: Hot Cocoa, Naturalle

Episode Notes

- Ray J's godsister Lil B will help him make the decisions along the way.
- Chardonnay does the splits for Ray J in front of everyone and he almost eliminates her, because he thought she was too forward with her sexual side.
- Ray J gives the girls glasses of champagne.

Reasons For Elimination

- Naturalle: Ray J felt that she was there more for her acting career, than trying to be with him
- Hot Cocoa: Ray J felt that she didn't make an effort to get to know him

=== Video Thrilled the Radio Star ===
First Aired February 9, 2009

Because Ray is on the road as a performer so much, he's looking for a woman who can keep him interested and entertained while he's away from home. So Ray challenges his ladies to impress him with a "video chat." Almost all of the ladies do just that, but the three that impressed him the most go on a sexy yacht date where he learns from them that one of the girls in the house may still have a boyfriend at home. At eliminations, Ray realizes not just one, but two more girls aren't fit to stay in the house and must go home.

— VH1 episode summary

- Challenge: Video Thrilled
- Challenge Winners: Danger, Cocktail, Chardonnay
- Bottom Three: Atomic Bomb, Caviar, Genuine
- Eliminated: Atomic Bomb, Genuine

Episode Notes

- During the video chat challenge, Chardonnay made herself a human banana split, with her putting the ice cream over her body, doing the split, and eating a banana.
- The challenge winners were automatically picked first by Ray J to stay in the house longer.

Reasons for Elimination

- Atomic Bomb: Ray J felt that she didn't open up to him.
- Genuine: Ray J felt that she was confusing him, first she saying she didn't like being in front of the camera, later mentioning she wanted to be an actress.

=== The Foxes are Feuding ===
First aired February 16, 2009 (2.254M viewers)

Ray J's house has quickly become divided between the diva/party girls and the darling/conservative girls. In search of a girl who really knows him, Ray creates a challenge to test the girls - The Foxy Feud Challenge. Ray splits the girls into the two cliques in the house - the Divas and the Darlings - to see who's been paying attention. Pushed to know the most about Ray, one team easily wins the challenge. The captain of the winning team and Ray go out for a personal and romantic evening that goes perfectly until she reveals information that shocks Ray and makes him think about what he is really looking for. At eliminations, the situation becomes tense when some girls are called out and another girl is sent home.

— VH1 episode summary

- Guest Star: Tommy Davidson
- Challenge: Foxy Feud

Divas: Lil Hood, Feisty, Chardonnay, Cocktail, Caviar
Darlings: Danger, Unique, Cashmere, Stilts, Stacks

- Challenge Winners: Darling/Conservative Girls
- Captain Winner: Stilts
- Bottom 2: Stilts & Caviar
- Eliminated: Stilts

Episode Notes

Ray J has the girls play a game called "Foxy Feud" which is a parody of Family Feud.

Reasons for Elimination

- Stilts: Ray J found out that she is still legally married.

=== There's Something about Larry ===
First Aired February 23, 2009

Ray's down to 9 girls, so he challenges them to see if they can be a part of his musical life with a Motown-inspired singing challenge! The girls will be judged on singing ability, choreography, style and overall performance. One girl's questionable relationship is revealed and another's advances prove too much for Ray's taste -- and yet another young lady is sent packing.

— VH1 episode summary

- Guest Star: Big Boy (of Power 106), Willie Norwood
- Challenge: Motown competition
- Winners: Lil Hood, Cashmere, Cocktail
- Eliminated: Caviar

Episode Notes

- While Ray J was serenading Cocktail on their solo date, Cocktail started tearing up, realizing that Ray J might have a connection with her and Cocktail starting to fall in love with him.
- Ray J was suspicious about Caviar talking on the phone with Larry so he called in and found out the real truth.

Reason For elimination

- Caviar: Ray J found that Larry managed 395 girls around the world and found that Caviar is here only for exposure.

=== The Squeaky Wheel Gets the Oil ===
First Aired March 2, 2009 (2.434M viewers)

A lot of tension has been building in the house between the girls so Ray decides everyone needs to blow off some steam for the next challenge. With the help of renowned boxing trainer Jack Mosley, the girls get a lesson in boxing basics before they take on one another in some very intense ring fighting! The winning team gets a night at a hot dance club with Ray for some fun and craziness. Feeling the freedom of getting out of the house some of the girls get a little too loose on the date...leading Ray to once again weed through the girls who are there for the wrong reasons.

— VH1 episode summary

- Guest Star: Jack Mosley
- Challenge: Boxing Competition (Pink vs. Blue)

Pink Team: Lil Hood, Cocktail, Danger, Chardonnay
Blue Team: Feisty, Stacks, Unique, Cashmere

- Challenge Winners: Pink Team, Feisty^{[r]}
- Challenge Losers: Blue Team (except for Feisty)
- Quit: Stacks^{[w]}, Lil' Hood^{[w2]}

Episode Notes

- ^{^[r]} Ray let Feisty go on the date because the rest of her team quit the challenge and she was the only one to participate, and win, before they quit. He felt her teammates were unfair.
- ^{^[w]} Stacks left the competition due to family matters and Ray understood
- ^{^[w2]} Lil' Hood left because she felt she was being disrespected.

=== Bad Girls, Bad Girls Whatcha Gonna Do? ===
First aired March 16, 2009 (2.701M viewers)

Tensions continue to rise as the cliques in the house clash even further. Ray asks to find out about the girls' passions and it turns out that four of them love to be scantily clad, no matter what they're doing. Later Ray takes all the girls out on a date and finds out a shocking secret about one girl's past. The next day, Ray takes two girls on a steamy pool date, and one girl is pushed to her emotional limit, leading to a stunning tear-filled ending.

— VH1 episode summary

- Challenge: Show Ray something each girl is passionate about so he can get to know them better.
- Challenge Winner: Feisty and Unique
- Withdrew: Cashmere

Reason For withdrawal

- Cashmere: Cashmere felt the pressure amongst the other girls coming back on her for outing Cocktail's involvement in 6 episodes of The Bad Girls Club (later in the first season, credited as Joanna Hernandez, a golddigger, which Ray forgave as part of Cocktail's past) built up to a level that was too much for her to handle. The wine glass was there for the taking, but Ray was not about to pick it up and hand it to her, and she couldn't bring herself to take it, which qualifies as a voluntary withdrawal.

=== Rock and Roll All Night, and Feisty Every Day ===
First aired March 23, 2009 (2.346M viewers)

If Ray is going to choose one of the girls to be his one and only, she's going to have to not only work well with children but also cook a mean meal. So Ray sets up a challenge to test just that, he asks the girls to cook and raise money for his favorite charity -- The Norwood Kids Foundation. Things of course spiral out of control but a winning team emerges and they are treated to a special date where Ray learns even more about the other girls. Backstabbing and general sneakiness prevail as another girl is sent home for ultimately being the wrong girl for Ray.

— VH1 episode summary

- Challenge: The Norwood Kids Foundation Pancake Challenge.
- Challenge Winner: Cocktail, Chardonnay, Unique
- Bottom 2: Unique, Feisty
- Eliminated: Feisty

Reason for Elimination

- Feisty: Ray J felt that Feisty was just a party girl and was always drunk.

=== To Tell the Truth ===
First aired March 30, 2009

To help with his next challenge Ray invites someone he trusts the most to ask the toughest questions of all the girls through a lie detector test. When the truth is laid bare, everyone is shocked by what they hear and nothing in the house will be the same. At eliminations Ray explains that everyone has a past and instead of eliminating one for a checkered past she is celebrated for her honesty — but still another girl is sent home, but this time not for the usual reasons.

— VH1 episode summary

- Guest Star: Brandy
- Challenge: Lie Detector Test
- Challenge Winner: Chardonnay
- Bottom 2: Danger, Chardonnay
- Eliminated: Chardonnay

Reason for Elimination

- Chardonnay: Ray J felt that she was more of a friend than a potential love interest

Episode Notes

- For the solo date, Ray J took Chardonnay to a strip club where she showed him some of her moves.

=== Smashing Homies ===
First aired April 6, 2009 (3.164M viewers)

Ray is down to his final three girls and he pulls out all the stops by introducing them to a grilling by his closest friends and then an intimate yet brutal dinner with his mother and father. One girls' story may be too controversial for Ray to accept but in the end his decision shocks the girls so much - one is rushed to the hospital in an ending that is unforgettable!

— VH1 episode summary

- Guest Stars: Tom Green, Shorty Mack, Warren G, Noel "Detail" Fisher, Willie Norwood, Alia Kruz
- Eliminated: None

Episode Notes

- No one gets eliminated. Ray is waiting to meet each girl's family before he makes an elimination.
- Willie Norwood makes a second appearance in the show.

=== Clip Show ===
First Aired April 13, 2009

In this hour-long special, Ray sits down with the viewers to reveal never-before-seen footage of moments in and out of the house. Also, Ray revisits some of the classic moments from the series including play-by-play commentary. He'll show you extended clips from your favorite scenes and all the stuff you wanted to see but couldn't show you. From cat fights to all night parties to your favorite banana split...this clip show will be the ultimate recap of your favorite TV show.

— VH1 episode summary

Never Seen Clips

- Chardonnay, Cocktail and rest of the girls Partying.
- More of what happened in the video thrilled challenge
- Stilts and Ray J went to a studio recording.
- Feisty Partying and drinking, Chardonnay teaching Feisty how to do a split.
- Cocktail telling Ray J about the other girls, what they are doing in the house.
- Unique and Danger having the argument.
- Feisty being northern tropical
- Ray J and Chardonnay went to a strip club.
- Tom Green rapping to Ray J about Danger, including the extended remix version of "Danger: She Smashed The Homies."
- Feisty, Unique, Cavier, Danger and Stacks were in the kitchen having a conversation.
- The girls interrupt Ray J's conversations.
- The girls playing "Two Truths and a Lie" with each other, where you have to figure out which of the three statements isn't true.
- Lil'B and the girls imitating each other.
- Unique, Cocktail and Danger cooks food for Ray J and his parents.
- Ray J talks about the final 3 girls for the season finale.

=== What Doesn't Happen in Vegas, Stays in Vegas ===
First aired April 20, 2009 (4.22M viewers)

After the three remaining girls were given a chance to meet all of Ray's friends and family, Ray decides he needs to flip the script and go and meet their families. But the journey for Danger has become too much and she must leave the house before they go any further. In a shocking farewell, she packs her bags and says goodbye, but that this matter is far from finished!. The show must go on however, so Ray and the remaining two girls pack their bags. Unique's turn is first, so she gets on Ray's private jet to travel to Cleveland, Ohio to meet her parents. Meanwhile, arrangements are made for Cocktail to fly to Sacramento, California to be ready at the airport when he arrives. After quite an intense experience with Unique's family, Ray J leaves in his private jet for Sacramento to meet up with Cocktail, leaving Unique behind in Cleveland, but arranging for her flight to Las Vegas to meet later. Ray's goal of getting a better understanding of the two remaining girls works when he learns more than he ever expected. His experience with Cocktail's family is quite a different one from Unique's family! After meeting the ladies' families Ray decides that it's time to finish things right...so he and Cocktail get back on the jet and head to Vegas, where they meet up with Unique, much to Cocktail's buzzkill. So Ray spends quality time with each girl.

— VH1 episode summary

- Disqualified: Danger
- Families: Ray J takes each girl to meet her family.
- Unique's Family: Ray J and Unique went to Cleveland, to see Unique's Family.
- Cocktail's Family: Ray J and Cocktail went to Sacramento, to see Cocktail's Family.
- Dates: Ray J takes each girl on an individual date.
- Unique's Date: Ray J takes Unique to Alizé for her date, and an overnight stay in Ray J's Room.
- Cocktail's Date: Ray J takes Cocktail to Simon's Restaurant for her date, and an overnight stay in Ray J's Room.
- Winner: Cocktail
- Runner-Up: Unique

Episode Notes

- Ray J privately told Danger it was time to go home because he feared for her stability, health and safety.

Reasons for Elimination

- Unique: Ray J felt that she might be a little bit too controlling and meeting her family makes him more nervous like he was expected to be someone he isn't.

=== Reunion Show ===
First aired April 27, 2009 (3.753M viewers)

Ray J and all of the women gather to relive the highs and lows of a season that changed their lives forever. Along the way, voices will be raised and tears will be shed. This is one reunion show you can't miss!

— VH1 episode summary

Episode Notes

- Stilts talks about her time on the show and question of her marriage.
- Caviar talks about her time on the show and her photographer, Larry.
- Chardonnay talks about her and Ray J being friends.
- Danger talks about her health and pregnancy rumors.
- Unique talks about her time on the show and eliminating girls she associates with, including Cashmere.
- Cocktail talks about her time with Ray J.

Bonus Clips

- Feisty and Lil Hood talk about their time on the show.

Host: La La Vasquez

== Aftermath ==
On June 10, 2009, Cocktail announced on her MySpace page that she and Ray were no longer a couple, and had "not been together for a while now." Two days later, she alleged in an interview that Ray J had hurt her by lying to her about whether there would be a second season of the show, and that the "breaking point" came on tour when she realized that he was still "hooking up" with other girls. But when Ray J realized that she was serious about the relationship, he was honest with her and told her that it was "not going to work out."

== Contestants' appearances on other shows ==
- Chardonnay and Danger made a guest appearance on the second season.
- Cocktail has made her first televised appearance on the first season of The Bad Girls Club
- Cocktail made an appearance on the For the Love of Ray J season 2 reunion show.
- Lil' Hood (Chelsey), Cashmere (Leah), and Cocktail (Joanna Hernandez) were contestants on the canceled third season of I Love Money.
- Feisty (Elizabeth Mendez) competed on the fourth season of I Love Money, being the only For the Love of Ray J girl. She was eliminated in episode 6. She was also in the music video for Pitbull's "Hotel Room Service" in 2009.
