= Formal Invite =

Single by Ray J featuring Pharrell

from the album This Ain't a Game
- Released: February 5, 2002
- Length: 4:19
- Label: Atlantic
- Songwriters: William Norwood; Pharrell Williams; Charles Hugo
- Producer: The Neptunes

Ray J singles chronology
"Wait a Minute" (2001)	"Formal Invite" (2002)	"Keep Your Head Up" (2002)

Pharrell singles chronology
"Diddy" (2001)	"Formal Invite" (2002)	"Pass the Courvoisier, Part II" (2002)

"Formal Invite" is the second single from Ray J's album This Ain't a Game. It peaked at #35 on Billboard magazine's Hot R&B/Hip-Hop Singles Sales chart. Bobby Brown, Philly's Most Wanted, Tweet from Next and Derek Fisher of the Los Angeles Lakers made cameo appearances in the video shot for the song.

== Track listings ==
CD maxi single
No.	Title	Producer(s)	Length
1.	"Formal Invite" (Knockout Remix featuring Shorty Mack & Brandy)	The Neptunes; Ray J^{[a]}; Mack^{[a]}	4:43
2.	"Formal Invite" (The Blaze 1 Remix featuring LaLa and Pharrell)	The Neptunes	4:39
3.	"Formal Invite" (Album Version)	The Neptunes	5:06
4.	"Formal Invite" (Kelly G's Late Night Spanish Harlem Radio Edit)	The Neptunes; Kelly G^{[a]}	4:04

Notes

- ^{^a} denotes additional producer

== Charts ==
Chart (2002)	Peak position
US Hot R&B/Hip-Hop Songs (Billboard)	54
