= Wait a Minute (Ray J song) =

Single by Ray J featuring Lil' Kim

from the album This Ain't a Game
- Released: May 1, 2001
- Recorded: November 2000
- Genre: R&B; hip-hop
- Label: Atlantic
- Songwriters: William Norwood; Kimberly Jones; Pharrell Williams; Charles Hugo
- Producer: The Neptunes

Ray J singles chronology
"Another Day in Paradise" (2001)	"Wait a Minute" (2001)	"Formal Invite" (2002)

Lil' Kim singles chronology
"How Many Licks?" (2000)	"Wait a Minute" (2001)	"Lady Marmalade" (2001)

"Wait a Minute" is a song by American singer Ray J, which served as the lead single from his second studio album This Ain't a Game (2001). The song features guest vocals from then-Atlantic labelmate Lil' Kim, and production by duo the Neptunes; member Pharrell Williams performs its chorus. Ray J's first single since "Let It Go" (1997) to reach the top 40 of the Billboard charts, the song peaked at number 30 and reached number 8 on the Hot R&B/Hip-Hop Songs chart.

== Music video ==
A music video for the single directed by Billie Woodruff, featured cameo appearances by Jackie Long, Pharrell Williams and Ray J's sister Brandy and was released in June 2001, and received heavy rotation on music channels such as BET.

== Chart performance ==
It also scored moderate success overseas, particularly in the UK, with a number 54 placement on the UK Singles Chart. The single appeared on the charts in Germany and Switzerland.

== Samples ==
In August 2024, rappers Dyce Payso and Fatman Scoop released the single "Let It Go", which heavily samples the instrumental to "Wait a Minute".

== Charts ==
=== Weekly charts ===
Chart (2001)	Peak position
Germany (GfK)	72
Netherlands (Single Top 100)	75
Switzerland (Schweizer Hitparade)	80
UK Singles (OCC)	54
UK Dance (OCC)	15
UK Hip Hop/R&B (OCC)	15
US Billboard Hot 100	30
US Hot R&B/Hip-Hop Songs (Billboard)	8
US Rhythmic Airplay (Billboard)	17

=== Year-end charts ===
Chart (2001)	Position
US Hot R&B/Hip-Hop Songs (Billboard)	52
