= What I Need (Ray J song) =

Single by Ray J

from the album Raydiation
- Released: January 6, 2006
- Genre: R&B
- Length: 3:46
- Label: Sanctuary, Knockout, Songbook, Reprise, Warner Bros., Asylum
- Songwriters: LaShawn Daniels, Fred Jerkins III, Rodney Jerkins
- Producer: Darkchild

Ray J singles chronology
"One Wish" (2005)	"What I Need" (2006)	"Let's Play House" (2006)

"What I Need" is a song by American recording artist Ray J. It was written by Rodney "Darkchild" Jerkins, LaShawn Daniels, Fred Jerkins III, and Ray J for his 2005 album Raydiation, while production was handled by the former. Released as the second single from the album following "One Wish", it reached number 58 on Billboard's Hot R&B/Hip-Hop Songs chart.

== Release and reception ==
"What I Need" earned generally positive reviews by critics. Billboard magazine felt that the song "should be enough to momentum. Here, Ray J's vocals once again seem strained as he cops another plea to the woman he has done wrong. Despite its sap factor, "What I Need" will likely lap up radio play."

== "Smokin Trees (What I Need Remix)" ==
The remix version with West Coast rappers Nate Dogg, Shorty Mack, Slim Thug and Snoop Dogg became even more popular being watched more than 200,000 times on YouTube. It's called "Smokin Trees (What I Need Remix)" and produced by Ray J for Knockout Entertainment and was expected to be released as "Smokin Smokin Weed" which featured Ray J, Nate Dogg and Snoop Dogg only, on Tha Blue Carpet Treatment by Snoop Dogg.

== Charts ==
=== Weekly charts ===
Chart (2006)	Peak position
US Hot R&B/Hip-Hop Songs (Billboard)	58
