= For the Love of Ray J =

- Created by: Cris Abrego; Mark Cronin
- Starring: Willie Ray Norwood Jr.
- Composer: Moweezy
- Country of origin: United States
- No. of seasons: 2
- No. of episodes: 26

Production
- Executive producers: Cris Abrego; Mark Cronin; Paul “UNPFKT” A. Ben Samek
- Running time: 60 minutes (including commercials)
- Production company: 51 Minds Entertainment

Original release
- Network: VH1
- Release: February 2, 2009 – February 8, 2010

Related
- I Love Money; Brandy & Ray J: A Family Business

For the Love of Ray J is a dating show on VH1 featuring hip hop singer Ray J. The program has a format similar to Flavor of Love, I Love New York, and Rock of Love with Bret Michaels. In reference to the series, Ray J said:

I've been in this game a long time... I've been with a lot of women but I'm ready to get out. I want to do this show to find a ride or die chick, a chick that makes me want to get out of the game.

The show ended right before the spin-off Family Business which stars Ray and his sister Brandy. Ray J called the show "a learning experience."

It was just a learning experience for me to just let it happen naturally, absolutely.

== Season 1 ==
The show, which premiered on February 2, 2009, follows Ray J and a group of 14 female contestants. The winner was Cocktail (Joanna Hernandez).

== Season 2 ==
A second season premiered on November 2, 2009, with a group of 19 female contestants. The winner was 32 year-old Mz. Berry (Connie Deveaux).

== Airing of the show ==
Season	Season premiere	Season finale	Reunion show	Winner	Runner up	Contestants	Episodes
1	February 2, 2009 (2.3M viewers)	April 20, 2009 (4.22M viewers)	April 27, 2009 (3.753M viewers)	Cocktail (Joanna Hernandez)	Unique (Danielle Pastorino)	14	12
2	November 2, 2009	February 1, 2010	February 8, 2010	Mz Berry (Connie Deveaux)	Platinum (Mary Cherry)	19	14
