= Sweet Brown Sugar =

Sweet Brown Sugar may refer to:

- Skip Young (wrestler) (Galton W. Young; 1951–2010), American professional wrestler
- Koko B. Ware (James Ware; born 1957), American professional wrestler
- Sweet Brown Sugar, a 1993 album by Rosie Ledet
- "Sweet Brown Sugar", a song by Timmy Thomas from the 1974 album You're the Song I've Always Wanted to Sing
- "Sweet Brown Sugar", a song by Calypso Rose from the 2012 album The Queen of Trinidad

== See also ==
- Brown Sugar (disambiguation)
