= Raydiation =

Studio album by Ray J
- Released: September 20, 2005
- Genre: R&B
- Length: 61:07
- Label: Sanctuary; Knockout; Atlantic
- Producer: Ray J (also exec.); Brandy Norwood (exec.); Detail; Rodney Jerkins; R. Kelly; Ric Rude; Timbaland

Ray J chronology
This Ain't a Game (2001)	Raydiation (2005)	All I Feel (2008)

Singles from Raydiation
- 1. "One Wish" Released: July 25, 2005; 2. "What I Need" Released: January 6, 2006; 3. "Let's Play House" Released: April 4, 2006

Raydiation is the third studio album by American recording artist Ray J. It was released by Sanctuary Records in association with the singer's own label, Knockout Entertainment, on September 20, 2005, in the United States. Ray J's first effort in four years, the album was primarily produced by Detail, featuring additional production from Rodney "Darkchild" Jerkins, R. Kelly, Ric Rude, and Timbaland. Rapper Fat Joe, singer Mýa and Ray J's sister, singer Brandy, appear as guest vocalists on the album.

== Promotion ==
"One Wish" was chosen as the first single over "Keep Sweatin" and "Quit Actin". The Jerkins-produced track became a US national hit, peaking at number 11 on Billboard's Hot 100 on January 17, 2006. It became Ray-J's first single to reach the Top 20 and was followed by "What I Need" and "Lets Play House".

== Critical reception ==
Professional ratings
Review scores
Source	Rating
Allmusic	2/5 stars

Allmusic editor Andy Kellman found that Raydiation "isn't any less derivative than Everything You Want and This Ain't a Game. He's still putting on airs, rarely deviating from copping his moves off R. Kelly and Usher. There's really nothing worth singling out [...] If Ray J plans on maintaining his every-four-years release schedule, he might as well spend less time soaking up his influences and more time developing some individuality."

== Chart performance ==
In the United States, Raydiation entered the Billboard 200 at number 48, selling 21,517 copies in its first week of release. In addition, it peaked at number 13 on the Top R&B/Hip-Hop Albums chart. Billboard ranked the album 85th on its Top R&B/Hip-Hop Albums year end listing.

== Track listing ==
Raydiation track listing
No.	Title	Writer(s)	Producer(s)	Length
1.	"Raydiation Intro"	William Norwood Jr.; Noel "Detail" Fisher; Derrick Williams	Detail	1:58
2.	"Keep Sweatin" (featuring Fat Joe)	W. Norwood; Joseph Cartagena; LaShawn Daniels; Rodney Jerkins; Fred Jerkins III	R. Jerkins; Daniels^{[a]}	4:18
3.	"What I Need"	W. Norwood; Daniels; R. Jerkins; F. Jerkins	R. Jerkins; Daniels^{[a]}	3:33
4.	"One Wish"	W. Norwood; Daniels; R. Jerkins; F. Jerkins	R. Jerkins; Daniels^{[a]}	5:37
5.	"Let's Play House"	R. Jerkins; Rudy Currence; Ricky Lewis	R. Jerkins; Ric Rude	3:54
6.	"Blue High Heels"	W. Norwood	Detail; Ray J	4:01
7.	"Melody"	Fisher; Sean "Lyriq" Matthews	Detail	4:47
8.	"War Is Over" (featuring Brandy)	W. Norwood; Fisher; Brandy Norwood	Ray J; Brandy Norwood^{[a]}	3:29
9.	"Quit Actin" (featuring R. Kelly and Shorty Mack)	Robert Kelly	Kelly	3:58
10.	"Exotic"	W. Norwood; Fisher	Detail	3:50
11.	"Unbelievable" (featuring Gangsta Girl, Detail and Shorty Mack)	W. Norwood; Timothy Mosley; Derrelle Owens; Walter Millsap III; Candice Nelson	Timbaland	3:58
12.	"Sexy" (featuring Mýa)	W. Norwood; Fisher; Mya Harrison	Detail	4:38
13.	"In tha Mood"	W. Norwood; Fisher	Detail	4:29
14.	"Anytime"	Dominic "Domwan" Durham	Detail	4:05
15.	"Centerview"	W. Norwood; Fisher	Detail; Ray J	4:33
Total length:				61:07

Notes

- ^{^[a]} denotes vocal producer

== Personnel ==
Credits are taken from the album's liner notes.

Instruments and performances

- Ray J – vocals (1–13), lead vocals (14–15)
- Brandy – vocals (8), background vocals (14)
- Rudy Currence – vocal arrangements (5)
- Fat Joe – rap vocals (2)
- Noel "Detail" Fisher – rap vocals (11)
- Gangsta Girl – rap vocals (11)
- R. Kelly – vocals (9)
- Donnie Lyle – guitar (9)
- Cornelius "Corny" Mims – bass (6, 8, 13)
- Mýa – vocals (12)
- Isaac Phillips – guitar (7)
- Shorty Mack – rap vocals (9, 11), background vocals (15)
- Tim Stuart – guitar (2, 4)
- Michael Teixeira – guitar (1, 6, 8, 10)

== Charts ==
=== Weekly charts ===
Weekly chart performance for Raydiation
Chart (2005)	Peak position
UK Albums (OCC)	144
UK Independent Albums (OCC)	19
UK R&B Albums (OCC)	19
US Billboard 200	48
US Top R&B/Hip-Hop Albums (Billboard)	13

=== Year-end charts ===
Year-end chart performance for Raydiation
Chart (2006)	Position
US Top R&B/Hip-Hop Albums (Billboard)	85

== Release history ==
List of release dates, showing region, and label
Region	Date	Label
United States	September 20, 2005	Sanctuary; Knockout; Atlantic
United Kingdom	December 2, 2005	Sanctuary; Knockout; Atlantic
