= Kim Kardashian, Superstar =

2007 pornographic film featuring Kim Kardashian and Ray J

- Directed by: Ray J
- Produced by: Ray J
- Starring: Kim Kardashian; Ray J
- Distributed by: Vivid Entertainment
- Release date: March 21, 2007
- Running time: 41 minutes 94 minutes (uncut)
- Country: United States
- Language: English

Kim Kardashian, Superstar (also known simply as Kim K Superstar) is a 2007 pornographic film featuring Kim Kardashian and Ray J. It depicts the pair having sexual intercourse in October 2003 while on vacation in Cabo San Lucas, Mexico. The film brought in more than US$1.4 million in its first six weeks.

== Background ==
The film features Kim Kardashian and Ray J in October 2003, in a luxury Esperanza resort in Cabo San Lucas, Mexico, for Kardashian's 23rd birthday. Ray J filmed much of the holiday with a handheld camcorder, capturing him and Kardashian "goofing around" and also having oral sex and sexual intercourse.

Kardashian was relatively unknown before the tape's release. She was known mainly as the daughter of Robert Kardashian, who was O. J. Simpson's defense attorney during Simpson's 1995 murder trial. She was also known as a friend and personal stylist for Paris Hilton after she appeared in three episodes of Hilton's show The Simple Life in 2006. She met Ray J in 2002 while working as a personal stylist to his sister, Brandy Norwood.

In 2013, Ray J released a song titled, "I Hit It First", which features a pixelated image of Kardashian for the cover art and heavily references his relationship with Kardashian.

In December 2018, Kardashian claimed she had been on the drug ecstasy (MDMA) while the tape was recorded.

== Release ==
The film was released on March 21, 2007, by Vivid Entertainment. According to a press release they issued, they purchased the tape from a "third party" for $1 million.

In April 2016, Ian Halperin alleged in his book Kardashian Dynasty that Kardashian and her mother, Kris Jenner, deliberately leaked the sex tape to Vivid Entertainment. According to Halperin, "A mutual friend of Kim and Paris Hilton had advised her that if she wanted to achieve fame, a sex tape would be the way to go … Kim had discussed the idea of producing a tape with her family beforehand … It was Kris who engineered the deal behind the scenes (with Vivid Entertainment) and was responsible for the tape seeing the light of day". On the release of Kardashian Dynasty, a representative for Kardashian and Jenner denied all of Halperin's assertions.

In 2022, Kanye West said he retrieved a laptop from Ray J that he believed contained unreleased footage related to the tape. Kardashian's representative said the device contained no unseen sexual content and that no second tape existed.

=== Lawsuits ===
In February 2007, before its release, Kardashian sued Vivid Entertainment for invasion of privacy, and for the profits from and ownership of the tape.

In October 2025, Kardashian and Jenner filed a defamation lawsuit against Ray J, alleging that he had made false public claims that they were involved in racketeering and under federal investigation, and that he was cooperating with federal investigators on a racketeering case against them. In November 2025, Ray J filed a cross-complaint in response, disputing the allegations and accusing Kardashian and Jenner of breaching a former 2023 settlement over his and Kardashian's tape by discussing the tape again on Kardashian and Jenner's reality television series, The Kardashians. Ray J also alleged that he and Kardashian had discussed releasing the tape publicly in 2006, that Kardashian wanted Kris Jenner to oversee the release, and that Ray J, Kardashian, and Jenner all signed licensing agreements with Vivid Entertainment.

In declarations filed in Los Angeles on March 10, 2026, Kardashian and Jenner denied Ray J's claims that they had planned the tape's release and used the 2007 lawsuit against Vivid Entertainment to generate publicity, with Kardashian calling those claims "a lie".

== See also ==
- Celebrity sex tape
- Sex scandal
