= Brown sugar (disambiguation) =

Brown sugar is unrefined or partially refined soft sugar.

Brown Sugar may also refer to:

== Film and theatre ==
- Brown Sugar (1922 film), a British silent film directed by Fred Paul
- Brown Sugar (1931 film), a British romantic drama directed by Leslie S. Hiscott
- Brown Sugar (2002 film), an American romantic drama directed by Rick Famuyiwa
- Brown Sugar (play), 1937 play by Mrs. Bernie Angus

== Music ==
=== Artists ===
- Brown Sugar (group), a 1976–1983 British female vocal reggae group
- Clydie King (1943–2019), also known as Brown Sugar, American session vocalist

=== Albums ===
- Brown Sugar (D'Angelo album) or the title song (see below), 1995
- Brown Sugar (Freddie Roach album) or the title track, 1964
- Brown Sugar (soundtrack), or the title song by Mos Def and Faith Evans, from the 2002 film

=== Songs ===
- "Brown Sugar" (D'Angelo song), 1995
- "Brown Sugar" (Ider song), 2019
- "Brown Sugar" (Rolling Stones song), 1971
- "Brown Sugar", by John Mayall from The Blues Alone, 1967
- "Brown Sugar", by Ray J, 2015
- "Brown Sugar", by ZZ Top from ZZ Top's First Album, 1971

== Other uses ==
- Brown Sugar (streaming service), a video on demand service owned by Bounce Media
- Brown Sugar, a Crayola Heads 'n Tails crayon color
- Brown sugar, a grade of heroin

== See also ==
- Sweet Brown Sugar (disambiguation)
