= For the Love of Ray J season 2 =

For the Love of Ray J
- Season 2
- The cast of For the Love of Ray J 2
- Starring: Ray J
- No. of episodes: 14

Release
- Original network: VH1
- Original release: November 2, 2009 – February 8, 2010

Season chronology
- ← Previous; Season 1

For the Love of Ray J 2 is the second season of For the Love of Ray J on VH1. This season had Ray J bringing 19 women to see which one was the love of his life.

== Contestants ==
Nickname	Real name	Hometown	Age	Eliminated	Reason for nickname
Mz. Berry	Connie Deveaux	Saddle Brook, New Jersey	32	Winner	She looks like Halle Berry.
Platinum	Mary Cherry	Los Angeles, California	22	Runner-Up	Ray J said she was better than gold.
Luscious	Elle Navarro	Philippines/Oxnard, California	23	Episode 11 (Quit)	Ray J said she looks like a piece of Bubblicious bubble gum.
Caliente	Angeles Gimenez	Buenos Aires, Argentina	31	Episode 10	She is Latina.
Heartbreaker	Susana Montez	Fort Lauderdale, Florida	22	Episode 9	She was wearing a dress with a heart by her lap.
Flossy	Bethany Lucas	Daytona Beach, Florida	21	Episode 8	She is an expensive kind of girl.
Exotica	Leila Depina	Cape Verde	24	Episode 8	She is from Africa.
Extra	Sharmisa Garner	Dallas, Texas	21	Episode 7	She is a cheerleader, she likes shopping and poetry.
Jaguar	Courtney Cameron	Saint Paul, Minnesota	23	Episode 6	She is from Jacksonville.
Paradeez	Adele Figueira	Hawaii	22	Episode 5	She is from Hawaii also a play on words of her breasts "Pair of D's".
Adorable	Mikaela Rosario	Killeen, Texas	24	Episode 4	Ray J said she looks adorable.
Popper	Olia McKinzie	Russia/Dallas, Texas	25	Episode 4	She likes to pop lock.
Lava	Taneish Simpson	Portland, Jamaica	24	Episode 3	Ray J said she is hot.
Just Right	Latoya Bledsoe	Indianapolis, Indiana	32	Episode 3	She is not too big or not too small.
Trouble	Rachel Reed	Martinez, California	22	Episode 2	She looked like a trouble maker.
Gifts	Franschelle Criner	Las Vegas, Nevada	22	Episode 2	Gifts was going to be called jingle bells.
Fettuccini	Allison Ceglio	Long Island, New York	22	Episode 1	She is Italian.
Diego	Krista Hoffman	San Diego, California	21	Episode 1	Diego is a big Chargers fan.
Tipsy	Hana Franek	Hermitage, Pennsylvania	22	Episode 1	She was drunk.

== Call-out order ==
#	Contestants	Episodes											
#	Contestants	1	2	3	4	5	6	7	8	9	10	11	13
1	Adorable	Caliente	Jaguar	Mz. Berry	Flossy	Mz. Berry	Caliente	Caliente	Caliente	Caliente	Mz. Berry	Mz. Berry	Mz. Berry
2	Caliente	Jaguar	Lava	Caliente	Platinum	Flossy	Heartbreaker	Platinum	Platinum	Mz. Berry	Luscious	Platinum	Platinum
3	Diego	Mz. Berry	Luscious	Extra	Caliente	Caliente	Mz. Berry	Heartbreaker	Mz. Berry	Luscious	Platinum	Luscious	
4	Exotica	Extra	Mz. Berry	Jaguar	Heartbreaker	Exotica	Luscious	Luscious	Luscious	Platinum	Caliente		
5	Extra	Paradeez	Caliente	Paradeez	Mz. Berry	Platinum	Platinum	Flossy	Heartbreaker	Heartbreaker			
6	Fettuccini	Adorable	Flossy	Exotica	Extra	Luscious	Flossy	Exotica	Flossy				
7	Flossy	Exotica	Platinum	Flossy	Paradeez	Jaguar	Extra	Mz. Berry	Exotica				
8	Gifts	Platinum	Paradeez	Heartbreaker	Exotica	Extra	Exotica	Extra					
9	Heartbreaker	Heartbreaker	Just Right	Platinum	Luscious	Heartbreaker	Jaguar						
10	Jaguar	Gifts	Adorable	Adorable	Jaguar	Paradeez							
11	Just Right	Flossy	Heartbreaker	Popper	Adorable								
12	Lava	Popper	Popper	Luscious	Popper								
13	Luscious	Just Right	Exotica	Lava									
14	Mz. Berry	Trouble	Extra	Just Right									
15	Paradeez	Lava	Trouble										
16	Platinum	Luscious	Gifts										
17	Popper	Fettuccini											
18	Tipsy	Diego											
19	Trouble	Tipsy											

The contestant won Ray J's love.
The contestant went on an individual date with Ray J.
The contestant went on a group date with Ray J.
The contestant went on a group date and won some alone time with Ray J.
The contestant was not see receiving a glass, but was briefly shown holding one and stayed.
The contestant was eliminated.
The contestant won a date with Ray J, but was eliminated.
The contestant won a solo date with Ray J, but was eliminated.
The contestant quit the competition.

Notes

- In Episode 5, Ray J went on a date with every girl.
- In Episode 6, Jaguar won the challenge, won a solo date, but was still eliminated.
- In Episode 7, Ray did not hand out glasses, but said who was safe in order.
- In Episode 8, There were no challenges or dates, Ray had 2 girls from last season come back and review feedback from the girls to him to help make his decision.
- In Episode 11, there was no elimination due to Luscious quitting the competition.

== Episodes ==
=== That's What's Up ===
First aired: November 2, 2009

- Bottom 4: Diego, Fettucini, Luscious, Tipsy
- Eliminated: Tipsy, Diego, Fettucini

Reasons for elimination

- Tipsy: Ray J felt he had no connection with her, due to her being too tipsy.
- Diego: Ray J felt she was only getting know Ray J as an artist, not as a person.
- Fettucini: Ray J felt she wanted to date him for his celebrity status.

Episode notes

- During elimination, when Ray J got down to one glass, he said there were only four women left, but there are five women seemingly without glasses. Gifts is not seen receiving a glass, but she is shown holding one.
- When talking to Diego, Ray J listed his 5 favorite R&B artists to be Stevie Wonder, Michael Jackson, Whitney Houston, Luther Vandross, and Ray Charles.
- Fettucini has claimed on the way to the house that she has dated Tyson Beckford.
- Gifts was originally going to be called Jingle Bells by Ray J, but it was changed to Gifts on advice from Lil B.
- Just like Chardonnay on the first episode of the first season, Extra did splits for Ray J.

=== Ray's Leading Ladies ===
First aired: November 9, 2009

- Challenge: Create Movie Scenes To Act Out With Ray
- Challenge winners: Jaguar, Lava, Luscious
- Bottom 3: Extra, Gifts, Trouble
- Eliminated: Gifts, Trouble

Reasons for elimination

- Gifts: Ray J felt her movie scene she created was confusing, picturing the relationship being only sexual, equating it to a one-night stand with "no happy ending".
- Trouble: Ray J heard from the other girls she was too drunk and she was ready to give up.

Episode notes

- In her movie scene, Just Right alluded to Ray J's sex tape with Kim Kardashian.
- Ray J immediately picked the three girls (Jaguar, Luscious, and Lava) who won dates with him first during elimination.
- In a bonus clip, when Ray J was talking to Heartbreaker, a cameraman accidentally slip and fell in the pool.
- In a bonus clip, Ray J stated that he does not like girls having onion breath.

=== Not Again Dre... ===
First aired: November 16, 2009

- Guest star: La La, Super Crew
- Challenge: Dance Battle Challenge
  - Team 1 (Hot Damn Crew): Caliente, Exotica, Extra, Jaguar, Paradeez
  - Team 2 (Stingrays): Adorable, Flossy, Heartbreaker, Platinum, Popper,
  - Team 3 (Talk Of The Town): Just Right, Lava, Lucsious, Mz. Berry
- Challenge winner(s): Team 3 (Talk Of The Town)
- Bottom 3: Just Right, Lava, Luscious
- Eliminated: Just Right, Lava

Reasons for elimination

- Just Right: Ray J felt no chemistry between her.
- Lava: Ray J felt Lava was too demanding and weird.

Episode notes

- Ray J's friend DJ Dre Sinatra told Ray J that he slept with Luscious. In the first season, it was revealed that Danger slept with Ray J's producer Detail.
- Extra had shorter hair in this episode, being noticeable during elimination.
- Unlike the previous episode, all the girls who won the date were at the chopping blocks, with the exception of Mz. Berry, who got her glass first.

=== Too Little Too Late ===
First aired: November 23, 2009

- Challenge: Style Ray For A Sean John Photo Shoot
  - Team 1: Flossy, Jaguar, Platinum
  - Team 2: Extra, Heartbreaker, Luscious
  - Team 3: Exotica, Paradeez, Popper
  - Team 4: Adorable, Caliente, Mz Berry
- Challenge Winner(s): Flossy, Jaguar, Platinum
- Solo Date: Jaguar
- Bottom 3: Adorable, Jaguar, Popper
- Eliminated: Popper, Adorable

Reasons for Elimination

- Popper: Ray J felt Popper came off a little too strong.
- Adorable: Ray J felt she's not making an effort to connect with him.

Episode Notes

- Unlike previous episodes, Ray J send his message in person instead of a video message.

=== Mean Girls ===
First aired: November 30, 2009

- Challenge: None
- Challenge Winner(s): None
- 1st Destination: Beach
- 1st Date: Caliente, Extra, Flossy, Platinum
- 1st Solo Date: Mz. Berry
- 2nd Destination: Bowling
- 2nd Date: Exotica, Heartbreaker, Jaguar
- Exotica: 16 pts.
- Jaguar: 76 pts.
- Heartbreaker: 77 pts.
- Win/Alone Time: Heartbreaker
- 3rd Destination: Backyard Spa Treatment
- 3rd Date: Luscious, Paradeez
- Bottom 2: Heartbreaker, Paradeez
- Eliminated: Paradeez

Reasons for elimination

- Paradeez: Ray J felt Paradeez never had a connection with him even after their one-on-one date. He felt that Paradeez is boring and has nothing to say to him.

Episode notes

- Ray J has a date with every girl, instead of having a challenge.
- Heartbreaker throws a glass of wine on Flossy, but Flossy told Ray J that Luscious threw it first.
- Caliente tackles Flossy while playing football on the beach with Ray J.
- Jaguar, Heartbreaker, and Exotica wanted to battle for alone time for Ray J by bowling.
- Ray J took Mz. Berry to Beso, a restaurant founded by Eva Longoria in Hollywood.
- When Ray J asked some questions concerning Mz. Berry's divorce, Mz. Berry interviewed she was actually glad he asked those questions.
- Lil B does not appear in this episode, but she appears in a bonus clip where she deliberates with Ray J.

=== Ray J Fever ===
First aired: December 7, 2009

- Guest Star: Brandy, La La
- Challenge: Come Up To Four Lyrics And Performance To Make A 70's Song
- Las Reinas De Oro: Caliente, Exotica, Jaguar
- The Sun Rays: Extra, Flossy, Mz. Berry
- The Wolf Pack: Heartbreaker, Luscious, Platinum
- Challenge Winner(s): Caliente, Exotica, Jaguar
- Solo Date: Jaguar
- Bottom 2: Exotica, Jaguar
- Eliminated: Jaguar

Reasons for Elimination

- Jaguar: After four dates, Ray J still could not feel a connection, due to her still having a wall. Due to this, Ray felt she is taking the connection too slow.

Episode Notes

- Caliente brought drinks to Ray J and Exotica to interrupt and end Exotica's one-on-one time with Ray.
- Extra gets a one on one time with Ray J, but Heartbreaker cut it short.
- Heartbreaker, Luscious, and Platinum gave Ray a bubble bath.
- Ray J and Jaguar sing together during their solo date. Ray J later completes and records the song titled "Can we fall in love"

=== The Amazing Rays ===
First aired: December 14, 2009

- Guest Stars: DeShawn Stevenson of the Washington Wizards, Danny Granger of the Indiana Pacers, Shorty Mack
- Challenge: Race Through Los Angeles
- Blue Team: Heartbreaker, Mz. Berry
- Green Team: Flossy, Luscious
- Pink Team: Caliente, Platinum
- Yellow Team: Exotica, Extra
- Challenge Winner(s): Caliente, Platinum
- 2nd Place: Exotica, Extra
- 3rd Place: Flossy, Luscious
- 4th Place: Heartbreaker, Mz. Berry
- Bottom 2: Extra, Mz. Berry
- Eliminated: Extra

Reasons for Elimination

- Extra: Ray felt she was treating him more like a crush than a love interest.

Episode Notes

- Ray went back to address the girls the challenge on video.
- Ray did not hand out glasses, but said who was safe in order. But at the end of elimination, he spray champagne among the girls.
- After eating the chili cheese dogs, the green team, pink, and the yellow team chose the athletic challenge (each girl shoots a three-pointer), while the blue team chose the artistic challenge (girls plays out a melody).
- Mz. Berry cried three times in this episode: crying after coming in last in the challenge, during lunch with Lil B and the rest of the girls (excluding Caliente), and in Ray's bedroom.

=== Dangers Liaisons ===
First aired: December 21, 2009

- Special Guest: Chardonnay and Danger from the first season
- Challenge: None
- Challenge Winner(s): None
- Bottom 3: Exotica, Flossy, Heartbreaker
- Eliminated: Exotica, Flossy

Reasons for Elimination

- Exotica: Ray eliminated her because she's not making an effort to spending more time with him.
- Flossy: Ray felt she was a little too young for him.

Episode Notes

- Danger & Chardonnay from season 1 came back to help Ray make his decision.
- Most of Danger's and Chardonnay's feedback of the girls were negative partly due to fact that both of them still has some feelings for Ray. Ray later felt that bringing Chardonnay and Danger could be a mistake.
- In two bonus clips, Ray found out that Heartbreaker had a brown tooth.
- The night Chardonnay came to the house, Flossy was so drunk that she peed in the potted plant instead of walking to the bathroom.

=== The Truth Will Set You Free ===
First aired: January 4, 2010

- Challenge: Lie Detector Test
- Challenge Winner(s): N/A
- Bottom 2: Heartbreaker, Platinum
- Eliminated: Heartbreaker

Reasons for Elimination

- Heartbreaker: Ray felt that she broke his heart when he found out that she does not want to end up with him.

Episode Notes

- Since the 70's challenge, Heartbreaker, Luscious, and Platinum have kept their group name The Wolfpack. But during this episode, the three girls have bigger concerns for Ray J than Caliente and Mz. Berry. During elimination, Ray J finally disbanded the group by sending Heartbreaker home.
- The reason why Mz. Berry does not trust Ray because there are other girls around in the competition.
- Ray found out that Caliente is also a TV show host and she has a long first name, being shortened to one name for immigration purposes.
- Ray was disappointed at Luscious for being "soft" on Platinum through interrogation.
- Ray found out that Platinum still has some feelings for her ex-boyfriend.

=== The Breaking Point ===
First aired: January 11, 2010

- First Date: Mz. Berry, Luscious
- Second Date: Caliente, Platinum
- Alone Time: Mz. Berry
- Bottom 2: Platinum, Caliente
- Eliminated: Caliente

Reasons for Elimination

- Caliente: Ray felt that Caliente is holding back her feelings and she is not serious in committing to a strong relationship.

Episode Notes

- During elimination, Ray wanted to talk to each girl privately.
- Ray took Luscious and Mz. Berry horseback riding.
- Ray took Caliente and Platinum go-kart racing.
- Even though Mz. Berry spend a night with Ray, she is still jealous of the other girls being around Ray the next day. Ray later told Mz. Berry during elimination that he needs to spend time with every girl so he can make the right decision.

=== Homie Invasion ===
First aired: January 18, 2010

- Guest Stars: Snoop Dogg, Brandy, Tom Green, Shorty Mack, Noel "Detail" Fisher
- Challenge: None
- Challenge Winner(s): None
- Bottom: None
- Quit: Luscious

Reasons for Quitting

- Luscious: She felt disrespected when Ray's friends kept chanting that she "smashed the homie" and felt Ray did not do anything to stop them.

Episode Notes

- Brandy asked each girl, if they are not chosen, who will be chosen? Luscious picked Platinum, Platinum surprisingly picked Mz. Berry, while Mz. Berry picked no one.
- Brandy chose Mz. Berry for Ray to pick, while Snoop chose Platinum. Ray's other homies cannot make a decision as a group.
- When Luscious felt like she wanted to give up, this upsets Ray so much that he tells her to leave the house.
- After Luscious left, Ray talked to Mz. Berry and Platinum and told them that Luscious would have been eliminated anyway.

=== Clip Show ===
First aired: January 25, 2010

Includes:

- Trouble being too drunk.
- Girls love to dance.
- Extra being extra.
- The Wolfpack targeting different girls in the house.
- Luscious being quirky.
- Caliente learning English.
- Danger bossing around the other girls.
- Chardonnay attempting to come back to the competition, but Ray saying no.

Episode notes

- After Luscious went home, Mz. Berry and Platinum also met Ray's parents.
- Just like in season one, Ray's mother said no to both girls for Ray, but she and Ray's father asked Ray to consider the pros and cons of being with each girl.

=== Come Away With Me ===
First aired: February 1, 2010

- Dates: Ray J takes each girl on an individual date.
- Platinum's Date: Went to Las Vegas
- Mz.Berry's Date: Went on Ray's yacht
- Winner: Mz. Berry

Reasons for Elimination

- Platinum: Ray felt that Platinum reminded him of his past relationships.

Episode Notes

- Once Mz. Berry was chosen the winner, winning Ray's heart, both Ray and Mz. Berry flew off on a private jet to a destination unknown.

=== Reunion Show ===
First aired: February 8, 2010

- Those who did attend the reunion: Lava, Popper, Jaguar, Extra, Exotica, Flossy, Heartbreaker, Caliente, Luscious, Platinum and Mz. Berry.
- Those who did not attend the reunion: Tipsy, Diego, Fettucini, Gifts, Trouble, Just Right, Adorable and Paradeez.
- Ray reunites with all the girls in the house.
- Lava reveals that she has been dating Jamaican Olympic sprinter, Usain Bolt.
- Ray realizes that eliminating Jaguar was a mistake, hinting that he has feelings for her.
- Ray apologizes to Jaguar for eliminating her and she tells him that they can get together someday if he and Mz. Berry do not work out.
- Ray sees Mz. Berry for the first time in 5 months. But Mz. Berry stated later that she did see Ray before the reunion.
- Cocktail, the winner from Season 1, comes on the show to warn Mz. Berry that Ray cannot be tied down to one woman.
- Ray and Cocktail get in a heated argument.
