= Sexy Ladies =

Single by Ray J featuring Shorty Mack and TruthKO

from the album For the Love of Ray J
- Released: February 24, 2009
- Recorded: 2009
- Genre: R&B; hip-hop
- Length: 3:19
- Label: Knockout; Koch
- Songwriters: William Ray Norwood Jr.; Stefvon Kowlessar; Derrelle Owens
- Producers: Keith Crouch; Ray J

Ray J singles chronology
"Keep It Playa" (2008)	"Sexy Ladies" (2009)	"Tie Me Down" (2009)

"Sexy Ladies" is the lead single from Ray J's album For the Love of Ray J. The song features guest appearances by Shorty Mack and TruthKO, and was produced by Keith Crouch and Ray J himself.

== Charts ==
Chart (2008/2009)	Peak position
U.S. Billboard Hot R&B/Hip-Hop Songs	73
German Black Chart	15
