= Shorty Mack =

American rapper (born 1981)

- Born: Derrelle Owens; June 9, 1981 (age 44)
- Origin: Sacramento, California, United States
- Genres: Hip hop
- Occupations: Producer, Rapper, songwriter, Actor
- Years active: 1991 - present
- Label: Knockout
- Website: http://www.myspace.com/officialpurpman

Derrelle Owens ( June 9, 1981), better known by his stage name Shorty Mack, was a producer, rapper and actor. He is most significantly known by his 1996 single, "Hard To Tame Me", and his self-titled debut album, both released under JVC/Vertex Music. He has since made appearances on numerous recordings by Ray J, including the Knockout remix of "Formal Invite" and the Smokin' Trees version of "What I Need". He also played the role of "Nyce" on the sitcom Moesha. Owens co-created Knockout Entertainment. A full-length album, tentatively titled Shorty Mack, was expected to be released in 2012.

== Filmography ==
- A Day In The Life (2009)
- Welfare to Millionaire (2007)
- Coach Carter (2005)
- JC In The Hood (2006)

=== TV series ===
- Moesha (1999–2001; 13 episodes)
- Boston Public (2004; 1 episode)
- Lincoln Heights(2007; 3 episodes)
- For The Love Of Ray J (2009–2010)
- Brandy and Ray J: A Family Business (2010–2011)

== Discography ==
=== Studio albums ===
Year	Title	Chart positions	
Year	Title	US	US R&B
1996	Shorty Mac	—	—

=== Singles ===
Year	Title	Chart positions		Album
Year	Title	US	US R&B	Album
1996	"Hard To Tame Me"	—	73	Shorty Mac
2009	"Sexy Ladies" (Ray J featuring Truth & Shorty Mack)	—	71	For the Love of Ray J

=== Guest appearances ===
Year	Song	Album
2001	"Out Tha Ghetto" (with Ray J)	This Ain't A Game
2001	"Formal Invite" (Knockout Remix) (with Ray J, Pharrell & Brandy)	Formal Invite - Single
2005	"Quit Actin" (with R. Kelly & Ray J)	Raydiation
2005	"Unbelievable" (with Ray J & Detail)	Raydiation
2006	"Smokin' Smokin' Trees" (with Snoop Dogg, Slim Thug, Nate Dogg & Ray J)	--
2008	"Good Girl Gone Bad" (with Ray J)	All I Feel
2009	"Sexy Ladies" (with Ray J & Truth)	For The Love Of Ray J
2009	"Sex In The Rain" (with Ray J)	For The Love Of Ray J
2009	"Dirty Samantha" (with Ray J)	For The Love Of Ray J
2009	"Good Times" (with Ray J)	For The Love Of Ray J
2011	"Ready To Roll" (with Ray J)	A Family Business
