= I Hit It First =

Single by Ray J featuring Bobby Brackins
- Released: April 9, 2013
- Recorded: 2013
- Genre: Hip hop; R&B
- Length: 3:25
- Label: Knockout, Fifth Amendment, E1
- Songwriters: William Norwood Jr., Bobby Brackins, Nicholas Balding
- Producer: Nic Nac

Ray J singles chronology
"Bananaz" (2011)	"I Hit It First" (2013)	"Never Shoulda Did That" (2014)

Bobby Brackins singles chronology
"143" (2010)	"I Hit It First" (2013)	"My Jam" (2015)

"I Hit It First" is a song by American singer Ray J. It features vocals from rapper Bobby Brackins and was produced by record producer Nic Nac, who helped to write the song with Ray J and Brackins.

== Background ==
The song is a reference to Ray J's past relationship with American reality star Kim Kardashian. Despite Ray J's comments about the subject of the song, there are numerous allusions to his relationship with his former girlfriend and references to it in the lyrics. The cover art for the single features a pixelated image of Kardashian. Kardashian's then husband, rapper Kanye West, and former husband and basketball player Kris Humphries, are indirectly referenced in the song, with the chorus saying: "She might move onto rappers, and ball players, but we all know I hit it first". Ray J also alludes to Kanye West with the lyrics "But now baby chose to go West". Also mentioned in the song is the sex tape that he made with Kardashian that launched her career as a reality star.

== Charts ==
Chart (2013)	Peak position
UK Hip Hop/R&B (OCC)	39
UK Singles (Official Charts Company)	132
US Billboard Hot 100	51
US Hot R&B/Hip-Hop Songs (Billboard)	11

== Release history ==
Country	Date	Format	Label
United States	April 9, 2013	Digital download	Knockout Entertainment, Fifth Amendment Entertainment, E1 Music
