= Bobby Brackins =

American singer, songwriter, and record producer from California

- Also known as: Young Bob
- Born: Robert Clifton Brackins III; September 14, 1988 (age 37); Berkeley, California, U.S.
- Origin: East Oakland, California, U.S.
- Genres: Pop rap
- Occupations: Rapper; songwriter; record producer
- Instrument: Vocals
- Labels: Indie-Pop Music; Lava; Republic; Tycoon Status
- Website: www.bobbybrackins.com

Robert Clifton Brackins III (born September 14, 1988) is an American rapper, record producer, and songwriter. Born in Berkeley and raised in East Oakland, California, he is best known as a credited songwriter on the 2014 singles "2 On" by Tinashe and "Loyal" by Chris Brown. both of which were certified multi-platinum by the Recording Industry Association of America (RIAA). As a recording artist, he is known for his guest appearance on Ray J's 2013 single "I Hit It First", which peaked at number 51 on the Billboard Hot 100.

Brackins signed with Republic Records as a solo act in 2010; his debut single, "143" (featuring Ray J) was released in May of that year and peaked at number 84 on the Billboard Hot 100. His debut studio album, To Live For (2016) was supported by the singles "Hot Box" (featuring G-Eazy and Mila J) and "My Jam" (featuring Zendaya and Jeremih). He frequently writes for productions by fellow California-based producer Nic Nac, with whom he formed the group Go Dav in 2007.

== Early life ==
Robert Clifton Brackins III was born on September 14, 1988, in Berkeley, California. During Brackins' infancy, his parents relocated to East Oakland, California, where he was raised. His father Robert Clifton Brackins Sr. owned a music studio in the Bay Area. During an interview, Brackins discretely recalls being around artists such as Tony Tony Tony while with his father in the studio. Brackins did not, however, begin to take music seriously until his freshman year of high school when he connected with music producer Nic Nac through a mutual friend. The two began working on music together, after discovering Nic Nac's ability to produce instrumentals, and Brackins' ability to create and write lyrics and melodies. After Graduating high school, Brackins attended San Jose State University, but dropped out and moved to Los Angeles, California where he currently resides.

== Career ==
Brackins musical career began after he formed a band with a group of local friends called "Go Dav". The group entered and won a radio contest, causing their single "Ride Or Die Chick" to gain radio plays. Shortly after the contest, the song skyrocketed to fame on the MySpace social media network. Eventually, the group split up due to internal conflicts. After high school, Brackins moved to Los Angeles, California to be closer to Nic Nac and to further pursue his musical career. He was then able to meet other producers, artists and songwriters including Ray J, Pia Mia, Trev Case, Redwine, Marc Griffin/Marc E Bassy, and YG. He then released two mixtapes. His first of which, Pimp Hand Strong contained guest features from Marc Griffin, Kendre and Tinashe. His second mixtape, Maxwell Park contained guest features from Ray J, Forest Lipton, Lil Debbie, Iamsu! and Kreayshawn. In 2010, Brackins, Ty Dolla $ign and YG, went on a 10-day tour to promote their upcoming mixtape. The Young and Hungover mixtape was released in 2011 and was hosted by DJ Mustard and DJ Ill Will. Brackins' fame was primarily gained from his single "143" (featuring Ray J). After releasing the single, he signed with Universal Republic Records. After being signed, he released the single "I'm Ready" (featuring Marc Griffin), which was a description of Brackins' lifestyle after the release of "143". In March 2011, Brackins released a video for "A1" (featuring DEV) from his Live Good. 5 EP.

Eventually, Brackins was released from his contract with Republic. He then signed to the independent Bay Area-based record label, Tycoon Status Entertainment. Brackins continued writing songs for other artists including Zendaya's first single "Swag It Out", Tinashe's song "Chainless", and Pia Mia's single "F**k With You" (featuring G-Eazy). He has also written mainstream singles which include Chris Brown's "Loyal" and "Came To Do", Ty Dolla Sign's "Saved", and Tinashe's "2 On" and "Party Favors." After releasing singles "My Jam" (featuring Zendaya and Jeremih), "Hot Box" (featuring G-Eazy and Mila J), "Faithful" (featuring Ty Dolla Sign), as well as the latter's remix featuring Iamsu! and Indigo. His second EP, To Kill For was released 2017.

Brackins also guest appeared on songs including Marc E Bassy's "Drunk and I'm Drunk" and Mila J's song "Sorry". Other songs and features include Zendaya's "My Baby" off her debut self-titled studio album (which Brackins wrote before vocally featuring on the remix), Yellow Claw and DJ Mustard's track "In My Room" (which he wrote), and Pia Mia's SoundCloud release track "Underneath".

Aside from musical production, Brackins has also traveled on tour to open and perform for other artists. Brackins first joined Niykee Heaton during her Centerfold Tour. He opened and performed with Heaton in cities including Portland, Oregon, Boise, Idaho, and Seattle, Washington. Brackins also joined Marc E. Bassy for the West Coast dates of his Groovie People Tour, performing in cities such as Denver, Colorado, Vancouver, British Columbia, Canada, and Salt Lake City, Utah.

== Discography ==
Studio albums

List of albums
Title	Album details
To Live For	Released: May 13, 2016; Label: Tycoon Status; Format: Digital download
To Kill For	Released: August 24, 2018; Label: Tycoon Status; Format: Digital download

Extended plays

- Live Good .5 (2010)
- Mimosa Sundays (2011)

Mixtapes

- Making of a Legend as Young Bob (2009)
- Roberto Cabobby (2010)
- Pimp Hand Strong (2011)
- Stay On It (2012)
- Maxwell Park (2014)

Singles

- Skinny Jeans
- Hot Box ft. G-Eazy and Mila J
- My Jam featuring Zendaya and Jeremih
- 143 featuring Ray J
