= One Wish (Ray J song) =

Single by Ray J

from the album Raydiation
- Released: July 25, 2005
- Recorded: November–December 2004
- Genre: R&B
- Length: 5:36 (album version); 4:00 (radio edit)
- Label: Sanctuary, Knockout, Atlantic
- Songwriters: Willie Ray Norwood Jr. Rodney Jerkins; Fred Jerkins III; LaShawn Daniels
- Producer: Darkchild

Ray J singles chronology
"Keep Your Head Up" (2002)	"One Wish" (2005)	"What I Need" (2006)

"One Wish" is the first single from Ray J's third album Raydiation. Released in July 2005, the Darkchild produced track became a national hit, peaking at #11 on the Billboard Hot 100 singles chart on January 17, 2006. It became Ray J's first single to reach the Top 20. The song was notably sampled by Burial for his song "Archangel" from his album Untrue.

Rolling Stone listed it as the 71st best R&B song of the 21st century.

== Track listing ==
UK CD Single (2005)

1. "One Wish" [Album Version]
2. "One Wish" [Parabeats Remix]
3. "Keep Sweatin'" (Featuring Fat Joe) [Album Version]
4. "One Wish" [Video]

UK 12" Vinyl Single (2005)

1. "One Wish" [Album Version]
2. "One Wish" [Instrumental]
3. "One Wish" [A Cappella]
4. "One Wish" [Parabeats Remix]
5. "One Wish" [Parabeats Instrumental]

UK CD 1 – 2-Track Single [Re-Release] (2006)

1. "One Wish" [Radio Edit]
2. "One Wish" [Parabeats Remix]

UK CD 2 – Maxi Single (2006)

1. "One Wish" [Radio Edit]
2. "One Wish" (Desert Storm Remix Featuring Fabolous)
3. "One Wish" [Maurice Joshua Nu Soul Remix]
4. "One Wish" [Video]

+ Biography & Picture Gallery
+ "One Wish" [Ringtone]

== Chart performance ==
When the single was released in the UK on 31 October 2005, it became his highest charting solo single to date. "One Wish" peaked at #26, becoming his first top 30 hit. Despite its slight chart success the first time around, the single was re-released in the UK on 13 March 2006 with a host of new remixes. This time "One Wish" entered the UK top 20, peaking at #13.

=== Weekly charts ===
Chart (2005–06)	Peak position
Australia (ARIA)	49
Belgium (Ultratip Bubbling Under Flanders)	4
Canada CHR/Pop Top 30 (Radio & Records)	29
France (SNEP)	74
Germany (GfK)	73
Ireland (IRMA)	21
New Zealand (Recorded Music NZ)	20
Scottish Singles Sales (Official Charts)	21
UK Singles (Official Charts)	13
UK Hip Hop/R&B (Official Charts)	5
UK Indie (Official Charts)	1
US Billboard Hot 100	11
US Dance Airplay (Billboard)	6
US Hot R&B/Hip-Hop Songs (Billboard)	3
US Pop Airplay (Billboard)	16
US Rhythmic Airplay (Billboard)	2

=== Year-end charts ===
Chart (2005)	Position
US Hot R&B/Hip-Hop Songs (Billboard)	95
Chart (2006)	Position
UK Singles (OCC)	200
US Billboard Hot 100	67
US Hot R&B/Hip-Hop Songs (Billboard)	29
US Rhythmic (Billboard)	26

== Certifications ==
Region	Certification	Certified units/sales
New Zealand (RMNZ)	Platinum	30,000^{‡}
United Kingdom (BPI)	Silver	200,000^{‡}
^{‡} Sales+streaming figures based on certification alone.
