= This Ain't a Game =

Studio album by Ray J
- Released: June 19, 2001
- Genre: R&B
- Length: 64:36
- Label: Atlantic; Knockout
- Producer: Darrell "Delite" Allamby; DJ Clue; Duro; Brycyn Evans; Rodney Jerkins; The Neptunes; DeVante Swing; Chris Taylor

Ray J chronology
Everything You Want (1997)	This Ain't a Game (2001)	Raydiation (2005)

Singles from This Ain't a Game
- 1. "Wait a Minute" Released: May 1, 2001; 2. "Formal Invite" Released: February 5, 2002; 3. "Keep Your Head Up" Released: December 4, 2002

This Ain't a Game is the second studio album by American R&B singer Ray J. It was released by Atlantic Records on June 19, 2001 in the United States.

== Critical reception ==
Professional ratings
Review scores
Source	Rating
AllMusic	2/5 stars
Entertainment Weekly	B+
NME	3/5 stars
Vibe	2.5/5 stars

AllMusic editor Jon Azpiri found that the album "is full of macho posturing that is more than a little tedious. The best of the tracks on the album feature production from The Neptunes [...] Since This Ain't a Game has so little to offer, that line is what listeners will remember most about Ray J." In a positive review, Craig Seymour from Entertainment Weekly wrote: "Brandy’s little brother Ray-J matures nicely on this sophomore set, with production by R&B hotshots Rodney Jerkins and The Neptunes. The singing/acting biz kid, who evokes Bobby Brown and Off the Wall-era Jacko, sounds surprisingly credible on the hard-knock-life odes." NME found tha This Ain't a Game "is Ray J’s big chance. [He] might sound like he researched the role as "playa" following Jay-Z around and watching from behind a newspaper with two eye holes cut in it but the track smokes, and that’s that. [...] Again, Jerkins’ beats are what draw your attention. The stand-outs are few. The trademark Jerkins skittery beats are many."

== Chart performance ==
In the United States, the album debuted and peaked at number 21 on the Billboard 200 and at number nine on the Top R&B/Hip-Hop Albums, with first week sales of 62,000 copies. This Ain't a Game produced the top 40 hit single "Wait a Minute", featuring rapper Lil' Kim. It peaked at number 30 on the Billboard Hot 100. Second single, "Formal Invite" peaked at number 54 on the Hot R&B/Hip-Hop Singles & Tracks.

== Track listing ==
This Ain't a Game track listing
No.	Title	Writer(s)	Producer(s)	Length
1.	"Intro"	William Norwood II	Ray J	1:01
2.	"Wait a Minute" (featuring Pharrell & Lil' Kim)	Chad Hugo; Pharrell Williams; Kimberly Jones	The Neptunes	3:47
3.	"Takin' Control"	W. Norwood	Ray J	4:30
4.	"Formal Invite" (featuring Pharrell)	Williams; Hugo	The Neptunes	5:06
5.	"Keep Your Head Up"	Daniels; R. Jerkins; F. Jerkins	Rodney Jerkins	5:34
6.	"I Tried"	Brycyn Evans; Cynthia Loving	Evans	3:58
7.	"U Need It"/"U Don't"	W. Norwood	R. Jerkins	4:06
8.	"Out of the Ghetto" (featuring Shorty Mack)	Hugo; Owens; Williams	The Neptunes	4:27
9.	"No More"	Darrell Allamby; Kenny Dickerson; Antonio Mobley; Johnathen Rasboro	Allamby	4:47
10.	"This Ain't a Game"	Daniels; R. Jerkins; F. Jerkins	R. Jerkins	4:18
11.	"Interlude"	W. Norwood	Ray J	1:39
12.	"Wet Me"	Dalvin DeGrate	DeVante Swing	4:30
13.	"Crazy"	Daniels; R. Jerkins; F. Jerkins; R. Smith; Nora Payne	R. Jerkins	4:51
14.	"I Got It All"	Ken Ifill; Antonio Mobley; W. Norwood; E. Shaw	DJ Clue; Duro	4:04
15.	"Airport" (Skit)	Chris Taylor; Colin Wolfe	Taylor; Wolfe	0:55
16.	"Where Do We Go From Here"	Mobley; Oczavia Pittman	Ray J	7:10
Total length:				64:36

UK bonus track
No.	Title	Writer(s)	Producer(s)	Length
17.	"Formal Invite (Remix)" (featuring Busta Rhymes, Ludacris, Clipse, and Boobonic of Philly's Most Wanted)	Williams; Hugo; Trevor Smith; Christopher Bridges; Gene Thornton; Terrence Thornton; Al Holly	The Neptunes	6:25

== Charts ==
Weekly chart performance for This Ain't a Game
Chart (2001)	Peak position
Canadian R&B Albums (Nielsen SoundScan)	50
UK R&B Albums (OCC)	39
US Billboard 200	21
US Top R&B/Hip-Hop Albums (Billboard)	9
