= Everything You Want (Ray J song) =

1997 song by Ray J

Single by Ray J

from the album Everything You Want
- Released: April 1, 1997
- Genre: R&B
- Length: 3:51
- Label: EastWest; Elektra
- Songwriters: Keith Crouch; Kipper Jones; Ray J
- Producer: Keith Crouch

Ray J singles chronology
"Let It Go" (1997)	"Everything You Want" (1997)	"That's Why I Lie" (1998)

"Everything You Want" is a song performed by American singer Ray J, serving as both title track and second single from his debut Everything You Want (1997). The song peaked at #33 in New Zealand and #83 on the Billboard Hot 100.

== Personnel ==
All instruments played by Keith Crouch except where noted.

- Guitar - John “Jubu” Smith
- Trumpet - Johnny Britt
- Handclaps - Michael Williams, Keith Crouch, Roy “Dog” Pennon, Nora Payne, John “Jubu” Smith
- Saxophone - Derrick Edmondson
- Background Vocals - Kenny Lattimore, Ray J
- Vocal Arrangement - Keith Crouch

== Track listing ==
1. Everything You Want (album version)
2. Everything You Want (instrumental)
