= The Queen of Trinidad =

Studio album by Calypso Rose
- Released: June 19, 2012
- Genre: Calypso, Soca
- Length: 41:29
- Label: Maturity Productions/VPAL

The Queen of Trinidad is a studio album from Tobagonian Calypso singer/songwriter, Calypso Rose, released by Maturity Productions/VPAL on June 19, 2012.

The album features Calypso, Soca, Blues and the melodies and rhythms of Africa and Central America appealingly.

This album also includes a DVD: Calypso Rose, The Lioness of The Jungle, a documentary film by Pascale Obolo. The film shows her personal story, musical achievements, her beliefs and obligation to women's rights while travelling from Trinidad and Tobago to New York, Paris, and Africa.

She received more than twenty-five awards and honors in the West Indies and outside of the Caribbean countries.

== Track listing ==
No.	Title	Length
1.	"Back to Africa"	3:31
2.	"Summertime feat. Soft/Fred Deshayes"	3:48
3.	"Calypso Blues"	4:21
4.	"Israel By Bus"	4:00
5.	"Sweet Brown Sugar"	3:28
6.	"Underneath The Mango Tree"	2:24
7.	"I Say A Little Prayer"	4:18
8.	"A Man is A Man"	3:53
9.	"How Long"	5:21
10.	"Voodoo Lay Loo"	3:16
11.	"*Bonus Track--Rhum And Coca Cola"	2:59
Total length:		41:29
