= Knockout Entertainment =

- Parent company: Sony Music Entertainment
- Founded: 2001
- Founder: Ray J
- Distributor: RED Distribution
- Genre: R&B, hip hop, gospel
- Country of origin: US
- Location: Los Angeles, California, California

Knockout Entertainment is singer Ray J's vanity label, founded in 2001. The label specializes in R&B, hip hop, and gospel. Originally released under Sanctuary Records, a press release in December 2007 announced a new partnership with E1 Records. Before this, he mentioned his label on his 2001 album This Ain't A Game.

The label's debut, Ray J's Raydiation album—released September 2005—included the top twenty hit "One Wish" and went on to sell 1 million copies worldwide. Other releases include Willie Norwood's gospel album titled I Believe, which was not released in conjunction with any other label, and was only available as a digital download or through CD Baby and top-twenty albums Ray J's All I Feel and sister Brandy's Human.

== Roster ==
=== Artists ===
- FiNaTTicZ
- Ray J
- Yung Berg
- Shorty Mack
- Willie Norwood
- TruthKO
- Tasha Scott
- Jason Miller

== Discography ==
=== Albums ===
Year	Artist	Title	Chart positions	
Year	Artist	Title	US	US R&B
2005	Ray J	Raydiation	48	13
2006	Willie Norwood	I Believe	—	—
2008	Ray J	All I Feel	7	1
2008	Brandy	Human	15	5
2009	Ray J	For the Love of Ray J	—	53
2011	Brandy & Ray J	A Family Business	—	—

==== Future albums ====
- Shorty Mack - Tha Purp Man (TBA)
- Ray J - Raydiation 2 (TBA)

=== Singles ===
- From Raydiation (2005)

singles: "One Wish", "What I Need"

- From I Believe (2006)

single: "I Believe"

- From All I Feel (2008)

single: "Sexy Can I", "Gifts"

- From Human (2008)

single: "Right Here (Departed)", "Long Distance"

- From For the Love of Ray J (2009)

single: "Sexy Ladies", "For the Love of Ray J"

- From Sahyba (2012)

single: "Marco Polo"

- From I Hit It First (2013)

single: "I Hit It First"
