= Brandy & Ray J: A Family Business =

- Genre: Reality
- Created by: Cris Abrego; Mark Cronin; Ray J
- Starring: Brandy Norwood; Ray J
- Opening theme: "Business of Family" by Brandy & Ray J
- Country of origin: United States
- No. of seasons: 2
- No. of episodes: 22

Production
- Executive producers: Ben Samek; Brandy Norwood; Jeff Olde; Jill Holmes; Kristen Kelly; Mark Cronin; Matt Odgers; Ray J; Sonja Bates-Norwood; Willie Ray Norwood Sr.
- Running time: 40 minutes
- Production companies: 51 Minds Entertainment; Rn'B Productions

Original release
- Network: VH1
- Release: April 11, 2010 – February 27, 2011

Brandy & Ray J: A Family Business is an American reality television series that premiered on VH1 on April 11, 2010.

On November 15, 2010, VH1 announced that it renewed the series for a second season. The show's final episode aired on February 8, 2011.

== Overview ==
The series follows Brandy and Ray J as they overcome the daily struggles in their family business and follows their daily lives.

== Cast ==
=== Main cast ===
- Brandy Norwood – Ray J's older sister; R&B singer and actress
- Ray J Norwood – Brandy's younger brother; R&B singer and actor
- Sonja Bates-Norwood – Brandy and Ray J's mother and manager
- Willie Norwood – Brandy and Ray J's father and vocal coach

=== Supporting cast ===
- Shay Calhoun – Brandy's best friend
- Ryan Ramsey – Brandy and Ray J's cousin and manager
- Domo – Brandy's friend
- Lara – Brandy's friend
- Shorty Mack – Ray J's friend and rapper

=== Guest celebrities ===
- Rodney Jerkins
- Timbaland
- Tyrese
- Flo Rida
- Kelly Rowland
- Game
- Alia Kruz
- Big Boy
- Ludacris
- Gucci Mane
- Joi Campbell

== Episodes ==
=== Series overview ===
Season	Episodes	Originally released	
Season	Episodes	First released	Last released
1	11	April 11, 2010	June 27, 2010
2	11	December 5, 2010	February 27, 2011

=== Season 1 (2010) ===
No. overall	No. in season	Title	Original release date	U.S. viewers (millions)
1	1	"Tough Act to Follow"	April 11, 2010	1.4
"Brandy and Ray J are both ready to take their careers to the next level. They have had a lot of success over the years, but along the way the one person they've depended on the most has been their manager Sonja, who is also their mom. Sonja wants the kids to start handling more of the behind-the-scenes business so that she can take a step back. But whether or not Ray J and Brandy are ready for that is yet to be determined."
2	2	"Singled Out"	April 18, 2010	N/A
"It's time to tape the For the Love of Ray J 2 reunion show, but Ray is dreading having to face the girl he picked in the end, Mz Berry. When another girl from Ray's past shows up full of resentment from a broken heart, Ray is caught completely off-guard and loses sight of how to make things right. Meanwhile Brandy must come to terms with a complicated romance of her own."
3	3	"When Business Gets Personal"	April 25, 2010	N/A
Ray J wants to record an album with super-producer Rodney Jerkins, but he's surprised to find out that Brandy has issues with Rodney and is against the deal. Things get even more complicated when Rodney tells Ray that Sonja's abrasive reputation in the music industry is causing problems. Ray J is caught in the middle as the family tries to find balance between business and loyalty.
4	4	"House of Blues"	May 2, 2010	N/A
"Brandy has an important performance with Timbaland but when office antics get in the way of what should be a happy occasion, some deep-seeded [sic] family issues come to light that threaten to derail the family business."
5	5	"Picking Up the Pieces"	May 9, 2010	0.962
"Tensions are running high in the Norwood family. Sonja and Brandy try to figure out why their mother-daughter relationship is so strained, but answers don't come easily. On the business end, Ray J's priorities are called into question and he must decide whether to defend his ways or take a new approach."
6	6	"Taking Control"	May 16, 2010	N/A
"The Norwoods feel they need to turn up the heat on some business projects but it's not easy getting everyone on the same page. Will Sonja ever be able to take a step back from the business if Brandy and Ray J can't work as a team? Willie tries to keep Sonja on the right track, but it's an uphill battle."
7	7	"Go Big or Go Home"	May 23, 2010	0.920
"It's Brandy's 31st birthday and Ray J comes along to help her celebrate in Miami. Having failed to make Brandy's last birthday special, Ray J feels the pressure to go big and pull out all the stops. But the thing Brandy is hoping for the most is for a certain guy to show up. Sonja and Willie make the most of their time apart from the kids and rekindle some romance."
8	8	"Balancing Act"	May 30, 2010	0.677
"Brandy and Sonja work on improving their mother-daughter relationship after so many years of tension related to their management relationship. Meanwhile Ray J's growing success makes things complicated with his friends."
9	9	"Looking Back"	June 13, 2010	N/A
"Sonja spends some quality time with each of her kids, braving the wilderness on a camping trip with Brandy then visiting the old neighborhood in Carson, California where Ray grew up. The family has come a long way, but some old wounds still haven't healed."
10	10	"Let's Make a Deal"	June 20, 2010	N/A
"The Norwoods take the family business to the next level as Brandy and Ray J pursue record deals. Ray is handling business on his own, but Sonja has concerns about his decisions. Brandy is excited to begin recording a new hit album but first she must find the right producer."
11	11	"Family Reunion"	June 27, 2010	0.348
"The Norwoods head back to their small hometown of McComb, Mississippi for a family reunion complete with old stories, food, fishing, dancing and of course, music."

=== Season 2 (2010–2011) ===
No. overall	No. in season	Title	Original release date	U.S. viewers (millions)
12	1	"It's a Celebration"	December 5, 2010	0.535
"Our famous brother and sister duo are back! Ray returns with a new album, a new house and a new girl! He introduces that special person to the family but not everyone in Ray's life is happy about it, and Ray begins to question if this is the right time to be in a relationship. Brandy is confronted with a decision that will change her life forever."
13	2	"Don't Mess Up and Don't Embarrass Me"	December 12, 2010	1.025
"It's the day before Brandy's first performance on "Dancing with the Stars" and her nerves are getting the better of her. When her coach Maks provides no support for the stress and nervousness overtaking her, Brandy is left wondering if she'll be able to continue dancing with him. Ray's demons are back and challenge him to make a tough decision."
14	3	"Is This the Guy?"	December 19, 2010	1.023
"Brandy is ready to get back into the dating world and with the help of her best friend Shay, prepares for a blind date. But when the date gets stranger and stranger, she's left wondering if this is the guy for her. Meanwhile, an unexpected woman shows up at Ray's door and offers him something he's never had before..."
15	4	"Video Chick Killed the Music Star"	January 2, 2011	N/A
"Ray J is hard at work—with both his new album and his relationship with girlfriend Brittany – but it all could come crashing down when temptation strikes. Ray turns to Brandy for advice but what he hears is unexpected..."
16	5	"All Men Are Animals"	January 9, 2011	N/A
"A girls' day sitting poolside with best friend Shay leads to a double date Brandy will never forget. Meanwhile, Ray's on a double date of his own with girlfriend Brittany and receives an interesting outlook on how to deal with women..."
17	6	"You Move Covert"	January 16, 2011	N/A
Brandy gets a phone call that tests her friendship with Shay.
18	7	"This Is War"	January 23, 2011	N/A
19	8	"Taking a Stand"	January 30, 2011	N/A
20	9	"One Thing or the Other"	February 13, 2011	N/A
21	10	"You Smell Like Soap"	February 20, 2011	N/A
22	11	"Last Wish"	February 27, 2011	N/A

== Ratings ==
The show debuted in its 9 pm slot with 1.4 million viewers and rose to 1.5 million for its repeat at 11 pm in the United States.
