= Let It Go (Ray J song) =

Single by Ray J

from the album Everything You Want and Set It Off: Music From the New Line Cinema Motion Picture
- Released: January 7, 1997
- Recorded: 1996
- Genre: R&B
- Length: 3:51
- Label: EastWest, Elektra
- Songwriter(s): Keith Crouch; Glenn McKinney; Roy Pennon
- Producer(s): Keith Crouch

Ray J singles chronology
"Let It Go" (1997)	"Everything You Want" (1997)

"Let It Go" is the debut single by American R&B singer Ray J from his debut album Everything You Want (1997). It peaked at No. 10 in New Zealand and No. 25 in the U.S. (on March 11, 1997). It sold 600,000 copies domestically.

"Let It Go" appeared on the Set It Off soundtrack.

== Personnel ==
- Drums, Keyboard, and Clavinet - Keith Crouch
- Guitar - Glenn McKinney
- Bass - Roy “Dog” Pennon
- Handclaps - Keith Crouch, Dorian Abney
- Background Vocals - Sherree Ford-Payne, Keith Crouch, Ray J, Rahsaan Patterson, Dorian Abney
- Vocal Arrangements - Keith Crouch

== Track listing ==
1. "Let It Go"
2. "Days of Our Livez"

== Charts ==
=== Weekly charts ===
Chart (1997)	Peak position
Australia (ARIA)	85
New Zealand (Recorded Music NZ)	10
US Billboard Hot 100	25
US Hot R&B/Hip-Hop Songs (Billboard)	17

=== Year-end charts ===
Chart (1997)	Position
US Billboard Hot 100	100
US Hot R&B/Hip-Hop Songs (Billboard)	72
