= Everything You Want (Ray J album) =

Studio album by Ray J
- Released: March 25, 1997
- Genre: R&B
- Length: 64:51
- Label: EastWest
- Producer: Darryl Williams (exec.); Darrell "Delite" Allamby; Keith Crouch; Jason Hess; Jamey Jaz; Kipper Jones; Marc Nelson; Darrell Spencer

Ray J chronology
Everything You Want (1997)	This Ain't a Game (2001)

Singles from Everything You Want
- 1. "Let It Go" Released: March 11, 1997; 2. "Everything You Want" Released: April 1, 1997

Everything You Want is the debut studio album by American R&B singer Ray J. It was released by EastWest Records on March 25, 1997, in the United States.

== Critical reception ==
Professional ratings
Review scores
Source	Rating
Allmusic	1.5/5 stars

Allmusic rated the album one and a half stars out of five.

== Chart performance ==
Everything You Want sold under 100,000 copies to date, and while it failed to reach the US Billboard 200, it peaked at number 56 on the Top R&B/Hip-Hop Albums chart.

== Track listing ==
No.	Title	Writer(s)	Producer(s)	Length
1.	"Feel the Funk I... (Intro)"		Crouch	0:55
2.	"Let It Go"	Keith Crouch; Glenn McKinney; Roy Pennon	Crouch	5:45
3.	"Everything You Want"	Crouch; Kipper Jones	Crouch	5:12
4.	"Good Thangs"	Crouch; McKinney; Rahsaan Patterson	Crouch	5:03
5.	"The Promise"	Crouch; Nora Payne	Crouch	5:13
6.	"Changes"	Darrell "Delite" Allamby; Billy Lawrence; Shari Watson	Allamby	5:35
7.	"Thank You" (featuring Brandy)	Crouch; McKinney; Roy Pennon	Kipper Jones	5:20
8.	"Let It Go, Part II"	Crouch; McKinney; Booker T. Jones III	Crouch	6:06
9.	"Can't Run, Can't Hide"	Crouch; Payne	Crouch	4:42
10.	"Rock with Me" (featuring Keith Crouch)	Ray J; Crouch	Crouch	5:16
11.	"Love You from My Heart"	Marc Nelson; Darrell Spencer; Jason Hess	Nelson; Spencer; Hess	4:26
12.	"High on You"	Janet Jaz; Mikelyn	Jamey Jaz	4:40
13.	"Because of You"	Ray J; Jones; Crouch	Crouch	5:46
14.	"Feel the Funk II... (Outro)"		Crouch	0:52

== Charts ==
Chart (1997)	Peak position
US Top R&B/Hip-Hop Albums (Billboard)	56
