= Ray J =

American singer and rapper (born 1981)

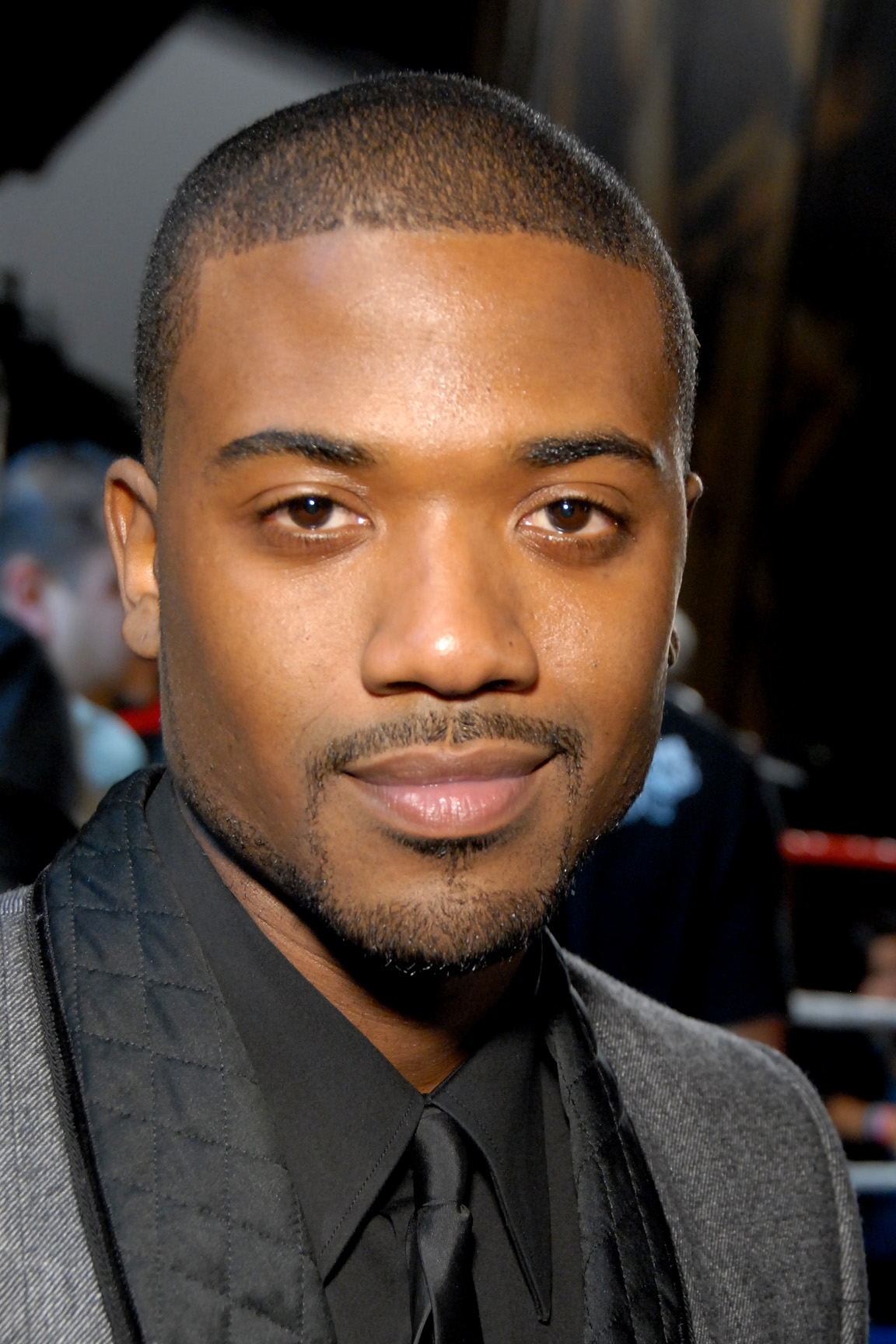
- Norwood in 2011
- Born: William Ray Norwood Jr. January 17, 1981 (age 45); McComb, Mississippi, U.S.
- Occupations: Singer; songwriter; rapper; television presenter; actor; entrepreneur
- Years active: 1989–present
- Works: Discography; filmography
- Television: For the Love of Ray J; Brandy & Ray J: A Family Business; Love & Hip Hop: Hollywood
- Spouse: Princess Love (m. 2016; sep. 2020)
- Partner: Kim Kardashian (2002–2006)
- Children: 2
- Father: Willie Norwood
- Relatives: Brandy Norwood (sister); Sy'Rai Smith (niece)
- Musical career
- Genre: R&B
- Instrument: Vocals
- Labels: TMG; E1; Knockout; Deja 34; Epic; Koch; Sanctuary; Atlantic; Elektra; EastWest
- Website: rayj.com

William Ray Norwood Jr. (born January 17, 1981), known professionally as Ray J, is an American R&B singer, rapper, songwriter, television presenter, and actor. Born in McComb, Mississippi, and raised in Carson, California, he is the younger brother of singer and actress Brandy.

Ray J's 1997 debut single, "Let It Go", was released by EastWest Records for the soundtrack to the F. Gary Gray film Set It Off. Both moderate hits, the song peaked within the top 40 of the Billboard Hot 100 and additionally served as lead single for Ray J's debut studio album, Everything You Want (1997), which entered the Top R&B/Hip-Hop Albums chart. He then signed with Atlantic Records to release his second album, This Ain't a Game (2002). Led by his second top 40 single, "Wait a Minute" (featuring Lil' Kim), the album became his first to enter the Billboard 200–at number 21. His 2005 single "One Wish" peaked at number 11 on the Billboard Hot 100 and preceded his third album, Raydiation (2005), which commercially trailed the success of both the song and his previous album. The albums were each met with mixed critical reception.

In 2007, he co-starred in the controversial adult film Kim Kardashian, Superstar, opposite then-relatively unknown actress Kim Kardashian. This foresaw the release of his fourth album, All I Feel (2008), which was critically panned, but yielded his furthest commercial success and peaked at number seven on the Billboard 200; it also spawned the single "Sexy Can I" (featuring Yung Berg), which peaked at number three on the Billboard Hot 100 and remains his highest charting song. Released independently, his 2013 single "I Hit It First" (featuring Bobby Brackins) peaked at number 51 on the chart, providing a brief period of resurgence as it talked about his previous affair with Kardashian.

In January 2017, he competed in the nineteenth season of the British reality television series Celebrity Big Brother. In his entrepreneurial career, he launched the technology company Raytroniks in 2016, as well as the Raycon line of direct-to-consumer earbuds in 2017.

== Early life ==
William Ray Norwood Jr. was born on January 17, 1981, in McComb, Mississippi, to Willie Norwood and Sonja Bates-Norwood. His older sister Brandy is a multi-platinum recording artist. Early in his life, he moved with his family from McComb to Carson, California, a suburb of Los Angeles. In 1989, started appearing in television commercials for different companies. In 1989, at the age of eight, Norwood began auditioning for and appearing in television commercials; he played the foster son in The Sinbad Show, from 1993 to 1994. This period in Norwood's life would shape his acting career. According to Bradley Torreano of AllMusic, "his easygoing image and boyish looks appealed to the producers of Brandy's television show, Moesha, giving him a role on the UPN series as Dorian "D-Money", a role he played from 1999 until the show ended in 2001.

== Career ==
=== 1995–2006: Everything You Want, This Ain't a Game, and Raydiation ===
He signed to Elektra Records in 1995 and he began to record his debut album Everything You Want the same year. The album, released in March 1997, spawned the lead single "Let It Go", which appeared on the Set It Off soundtrack. "Let It Go" peaked at number 25 in the U.S. and number 11 in New Zealand. The second single peaked at number 54 on the U.S. R&B chart. In 1997, he was dropped from the label. In 1998, he appeared on the Dr. Dolittle soundtrack with the single "That's Why I Lie". He produced for toy company Mattel, putting together the music for several commercials and a few of the demos for his second record.

Ray J recorded "Another Day in Paradise" with Brandy, which was a Top Ten success in Austria, UK, Germany, Sweden, Switzerland, Belgium, Norway, Ireland, and the Netherlands, and number 11 in Australia and France. The song was the lead single of the R&B/Hip Hop tribute Urban Renewal, in which he co-produced and performed songs. Norwood also worked with the Neptunes, Rodney Jerkins and Lil' Kim, and several other producers and singers for his second studio album This Ain't a Game. The album was recorded over 18 months, and was released on June 26, 2001, with Atlantic Records. The lead single "Wait a Minute" peaked at #30 on the U.S. Billboard Hot 100 chart and #8 on the Hot R&B/Hip-Hop Songs chart. "Formal Invite" followed at #54 on the R&B chart.

After a two-year break, Norwood returned to recording studios, adding the finishing touches on his third studio album Raydiation with help from producers such as Rodney Jerkins, Timbaland, R. Kelly, and Rob Egerton. A joint venture by Sanctuary Records and Ray-J's own label, independent Knockout Entertainment, the album was finally released on September 27, 2005, in North America after several delays, debuting at number forty-eight on the Billboard 200 chart, selling 18,321 copies in the first week. The album's lead single "One Wish" was a top 20 success in the US, UK, Ireland, and New Zealand. Raydiation eventually sold over 400,000 copies domestically.

In 2005, Norwood joined the cast of UPN's One on One, where he played the character D-Mack for the final season. On both shows, Ray's character was related to Brandy's character (cousin/half-brother on Moesha, brother on One on One).

=== 2007–11: Sex tape, All I Feel, and A Family Business ===
In February 2007, a pornographic home video he made with former girlfriend Kim Kardashian in 2003, Kim Kardashian, Superstar, was made public. Kardashian sued Vivid Entertainment for ownership of the tape. In late April 2007, Kardashian dropped the suit and settled with Vivid Entertainment for $5 million.

Knockout Entertainment announced a multimillion-dollar album deal with Koch Records and Shaquille O'Neal's "Deja 34" entertainment company. The first album for this deal is Ray J's fourth album All I Feel, which features The Game and Yung Berg among others. It was released on April 1, 2008. The album's first single is "Sexy Can I" featuring rapper Yung Berg peaked at number three on the Top Singles (Hot 100) for six weeks. A video for the track, directed by R. Malcolm Jones, was shot in December 2007. J starred in the Black Christmas movie Dark Christmas under the direction from Deon Taylor.

In 2009, Norwood starred in his own VH1 reality dating show, For the Love of Ray J. The show premiered on February 2, 2009. For his show on March 24, 2009, he released the soundtrack/studio album called For the Love of Ray J. On November 2, 2009, the show's second season premiered. In 2010, Norwood and his sister Brandy Norwood premiered the VH1 reality series Brandy & Ray J: A Family Business along with their parents. The show debuted in April 2010 and chronicled the backstage happenings of both siblings, while taking a bigger role in their family's management and production company, R&B Productions.

On June 19, 2011, Ray J, along with his sister Brandy and his father Willie Norwood Sr., released A Family Business, which serves as a soundtrack to their hit reality TV show, Brandy & Ray J: A Family Business, and was released through Time-Life Music. He released a single from the album called "Turnin' Me On". The song will be featured on his upcoming album as well.

=== 2012: Death of Whitney Houston ===
On February 11, 2012, Whitney Houston died of "accidental drowning", as ruled by the coroner. Ray J was in San Diego when she died and arrived at the Beverly Hilton, where Houston died, at the time paramedics and police officers came to the scene. While waiting for more information, he became angered upon hearing one of the officers make a "disrespectful comment" about Houston, prompting him to force entry into the suite prior to being restrained. Though he initially did not publicly address her death, Ray J broke his silence on February 17, 2012, when he told US Weekly that while the "world had lost an icon", he had lost a "close friend". Ray J's sister Brandy described him at the time of Houston's death as being "very distraught" and "disconnected" as well as referring to it as "a very hard time in his life."

Ray J and Houston became very close in the last years of her life, leading to speculation of a romantic relationship between the singers. However, Ray J stated that he and Houston were friends, and that they had never dated. On May 21, 2012, Ray J was found in his hotel room, unable to get out of bed and was rushed to a hospital by ambulance. The day before, he was said to have had a confrontation at the 2012 Billboard Music Awards when Whitney Houston's sister-in-law Pat Houston called security on him when she saw Ray J was seated next to Bobbi Kristina Brown, Whitney's daughter. Ray J went to the Beverly Hilton on August 1, 2012, for a panel during the TVOne portion of the 2012 Summer Television Critics Association tour. It was his first time there since Houston's death.

=== 2013–present: Reality TV and new music ===
Ray J teamed up with Bobby Brackins for the track "I Hit It First", which was released on April 6, 2013. "I Hit It First" caused controversy for allegedly aiming its lyrics at Kim Kardashian and Kanye West. The song has since debuted at #51 on the Billboard Hot 100. "ATM" was released as a single on August 5, 2014, and it features Migos. Ray J is hosting Oxygen's new reality game show series Bad Girls All-Star Battle. In May 2014, Kardashian and West married. Ray J was reported to have sent a check that totaled his profits off of the sex tape that year as a wedding gift.

He competed with his sister on the FOX reality cooking series My Kitchen Rules.

On January 3, 2017, Ray J took part as a "new star" housemate on season 19 of Celebrity Big Brother. He walked off the show after a week. He also threatened legal action after his exit from the show.

On March 15, 2020, Ray J and Princess Love took part in The Conversation on Zeus Network. In May 2020, Love filed for divorce.

== Other ventures ==
=== Technology companies ===
Raytroniks Inc.

As the founder of Raytroniks, Ray J introduced a line of consumer electronics to the United States market. The product categories included electric bikes, smartphone fans, and smartwatches. In particular, the Scoot-E-Bike brand which Ray J developed grew exponentially after implementing a viral organic marketing strategy. Ray J secured product placements through celebrities such as Sean Combs and Brandy and professional athletic teams, including the L.A. Clippers.

Raycon Inc.

In November 2017, Ray J co-founded a direct-to-consumer electronics brand called Raycon. Raycon sells wireless audio products such as earbuds and headphones. Ray J oversees brand and strategy.

== Personal life ==
In August 2016, Ray J married Princess Love at Los Angeles' Cathedral of Saint Vibiana. The two starred on VH1's Love & Hip Hop: Hollywood. Their daughter, Melody Love, was born on May 22, 2018. Their son, Epik Ray, was born on January 7, 2020. In May 2020, Love filed for divorce.

On January 28, 2026, Ray J revealed on social media that he was suffering from severe heart failure as a result of heavy binge drinking and drug abuse (such as Adderall) and was not expecting to live more than a year; he was diagnosed after a recent hospitalization for pneumonia. He said that Brandy was paying for his medical treatment.

== Politics ==
He, alongside Kanye West, attended the premiere of conservative commentator Candace Owens's documentary The Greatest Lie Ever Sold, a film investigating Black Lives Matter financial controversies. Owens had been a longstanding supporter of Ray J's allegations against the Kardashians regarding his and Kim's sex tape.

In January 2022, Ray J visited Donald Trump at his Mar-a-Lago residence to discuss job creation. Ray J went on to say, "I've always admired and respected [Trump's] business acumen... job creation, encouraging small business development and how Information Technology plays an important role in the future of our economy." Despite not endorsing a candidate, Ray J has intimated his support for Trump.

== Legal issues ==
On September 17, 2011, Fabolous tweeted about Ray J playing his song "One Wish" on a piano inside Floyd Mayweather Jr.'s house during a documentary on Mayweather and Victor Ortiz. Ray J confronted Fabolous in Las Vegas just before he was set to take stage at the Palms Casino and is alleged to have punched him in the face. He was arrested following the incident and in an interview with Power 105.1's The Breakfast Club, he explained why he took offense to Fabolous's tweets, stating that he played on the piano "every day" and referred to Mayweather as his "big brother" since the pair grew up together. Ray J demanded an on-air apology from Fabolous and threatened him, stating that he would "smack" him again. A number of celebrities were present during the incident, including 50 Cent, Mayweather and Kevin Hart. Three years later Ray J took full responsibility for the incident. He acknowledged that he had learned from the experience and felt terrible about it as well. According to Ray J, he went through a time of deep depression following the encounter, all the while trying to figure out what led him to act out the way he did and "how can I now grow and be better?"

On May 30, 2014, Ray J was at a bar of the Beverly Wilshire Hotel in Beverly Hills, California when a woman accused him of inappropriately touching her posterior. Police were called and deemed the touching incidental but he was asked to leave by the hotel staff. Ray J became angered because he contends he spent tens of thousands of dollars at the hotel over the last year. At some point, he allegedly became belligerent and according to the police, spat at an officer and kicked out a police car window in the process of being arrested. The charges against him included vandalism, resisting arrest and battery against a police officer. Ray J posted $20,000 bail and was released. The Los Angeles County district attorney on July 21, 2014, filed charges against Ray J and a police spokesman said his initial hearing would take place on July 25.

On July 22, 2014, prosecutors stated the arrest had turned into four criminal charges. He was charged with sexual battery, vandalism of a police car, battery against a police officer and resisting arrest. They claimed he willfully touched the woman's "intimate part" for the "specific purpose of sexual arousal, sexual gratification and sexual abuse." On August 19, Ray J pleaded not guilty to the misdemeanor charges.

He was stopped by two police officers on August 6, 2014, in the San Fernando Valley. The officers claimed he was using his cell phone while driving, Ray J insisted that he was struggling to connect his Bluetooth. He was given a warning about texting and driving. The officers reportedly wanted him to step out of his vehicle, which he did, but Ray J claims they simply wanted to take a couple of photographs with him. The LAPD began an internal affairs investigation into the encounter with the two officers.

On November 27, 2025, Ray J was arrested and booked in a Los Angeles-area jail after allegedly making a criminal threat to his estranged wife in his home. The heated argument was captured on his public livestream. He was released on a $50,000 bail.

== MMA ==
In May 2026, Ray J ventured into the world of mixed martial arts. He faced online rap personality DeWayne Stevenson (aka Supa Hot Fire) in an amateur bout on May 23 at an event held by Brand Risk Promotions. He lost the fight via TKO in the second round.

== Boxing ==
On August 15, 2026, Ray J made his boxing debut against actor Orlando Brown. The fight took place at an event headlined by Claressa Shields. Ray J won by unanimous decision.

== Discography ==
Studio albums

- Everything You Want (1997)
- This Ain't a Game (2001)
- Raydiation (2005)
- All I Feel (2008)
- Raydemption (2022)

== Filmography ==
=== Film ===
Year	Title	Role	Notes
1994	The Enemy Within	Todd	TV movie
1995	Once Upon a Time...When We Were Colored	Cliff (12 Yrs.)	
1996	Mars Attacks!	Cedric Williams	
1997	Steel	Martin	
2004	Christmas at Water's Edge	Alberto Turner	TV movie
2005	Envy	AJ	
2006	Save the Last Dance 2	Savion 'DJ Scientific' Gibson	Video
2009	A Day in the Life	Pinky	
2012	Switchin' the Script	David Bostick	
2015	Sharknado 3: Oh Hell No!	Tom Major	TV movie
2019	Slasher Party	Himself	
2019	Dear Santa, I Need a Date	Jason Vaughn	TV movie
2020	The App That Stole Christmas	Ray	
2023	Bomb Pizza	Entrepreneur	

=== Television ===
Year	Title	Role	Notes
1993	Rhythm & Jam	Himself/Host	Main Host
1993–1994	The Sinbad Show	L.J. Beckley	Main Cast
1997	All That	Himself	Episode: "Ray J"
1997	Soul Train	Himself	Episode: "Lil' Kim/Levert/Ray J"
1999	Aftershock: Earthquake in New York	Clayton	Episode: "Part 1 & 2"
1999–2001	Moesha	Dorian 'D-Money' Long	Main Cast: Season 5-6
2001	Top of the Pops	Himself	Episode: "Episode #38.23"
2001	The Proud Family	Mega (voice)	Episode: "EZ Jackster"
2002	Intimate Portrait	Himself	Episode: "Brandy Norwood"
2003	Black Sash	Bryan Lanier	Main Cast
2004	Punk'd	Himself	Episode: "Episode #3.6"
2005	106 & Park	Himself/Guest Host	Episode: "August 22, 2005"
2005	Cover Art	Himself	Episode: "Ray J: Clocks"
2005	Soul Train	Himself	Episode: "Ray J/Ebony Eyez"
2005–2006	One on One	Darrell "D-Mack" McGinty	Main Cast: Season 5
2006	Shark	Rapper	Episode: "Love Triangle"
2006	It's Showtime at the Apollo	Himself	Episode: "Ray J"
2008	BET's Top 25 Countdown	Himself	Episode: "Top 25 Heartaches"
2008	SBC Blue Room	Himself	Episode: "Ray J"
2008	Access Granted	Himself	Episode: "Brandy 'Right Here (Departed)'"
2008	It's Showtime at the Apollo	Himself	Episode: "Ray J & Yung Berg"
2009	Nite Tales: The Movie	Sporty O	Episode: "Ima Star"
2009	The Great Debate	Himself	Episode: "The Bonus Hour & Part 1-5"
2009–2010	For the Love of Ray J	Himself	Main Cast
2010–2011	Brandy & Ray J: A Family Business	Himself	Main Cast
2011	Famous Food	Himself	Episode: "Then We'll See Who's the MVP"
2011–2012	Video Hustler	Himself	Recurring Cast
2013	Ridiculousness	Himself	Episode: "Ray J"
2013–2014	The Rickey Smiley Show	Kenny	Recurring Cast: Season 2-3
2014	Joan & Melissa: Joan Knows Best?	Himself	Episode: "The Sex Tape"
2014	Funniest Wins	Himself	Episode: "Roasted"
2014	David Tutera's Celebrations	Himself	Episode: "Brandy and Ray J's Family Feud"
2014	Total Divas	Himself	Episode: "Red and Gold"
2014–2019	Love & Hip Hop: Hollywood	Himself	Main Cast: Season 1-6
2015–2018	Love & Hip Hop	Himself	Guest Cast: Season 5 & 9
2016	Driven to Love	Himself/Host	Main Host
2016	Notorious	Himself	Episode: "The Burn Book"
2016	Leave It to Stevie	Himself	Episode: "Southern Discomfort"
2017	Celebrity Big Brother	Himself/Contestant	Main Contestant : Season 19
2017	My Kitchen Rules	Himself/Contestant	Main Contestant
2017	The Real	Himself/Guest Co-Host	Episode: "Ray J/T-Pain/Should I Text My Ex?"
2017–2019	Hip Hop Squares	Himself/Contestant	Recurring Contestant
2018	Unsung Hollywood	Himself	Episode: "Ray J"
2019	Love & Hip Hop: Miami	Himself	Episode: "Family Matters"
2019	Love & Hip Hop: Atlanta	Himself	Recurring Cast: Season 8
2019	Love & Listings	Himself	Episode: "Can't We All Just Get a Loan?"
2020	The Conversation	Himself	Episode: "Ray J & Princess Part 1-3"
2020	Insecure	Rufus	Episode: "Lowkey Feelin' Myself"
2020	Pump	Sean Ford	Main Cast
2020–2022	The Talk	Himself/Guest Co-Host	Guest Co-Host: Season 10, Recurring Co-Host: Season 12
2021	Good Looking Out	Himself/Host	Main Host
2021	Love & Hip Hop: Secrets Unlocked	Himself	Episode: "Day Ones" & "Holy Heartaches"
2021	Family Reunion: Love & Hip Hop Edition	Himself	Main Cast
2022–2023	College Hill: Celebrity Edition	Himself	Main Cast: Season 1-2
2023–2024	Ms. Pat Settles It	Himself/Juror	Main Juror
2024	John Mulaney Presents: Everybody's in LA	Himself	Episode: "Coyotes"

== Accolades ==
Year	Nominated work	Category	Award	Result	Notes	Ref.
2022	Motomami	Album of the Year	Latin Grammy Awards	Won	As a songwriter on the song "Candy".	
