= Birdman discography =

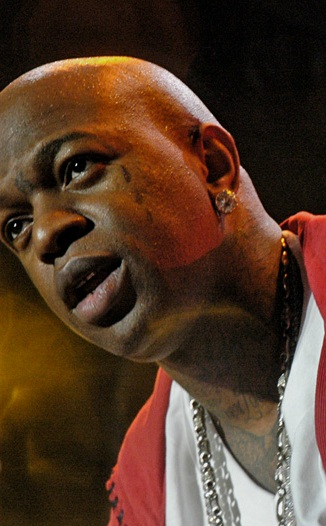
- Birdman performing at Hot 97's Summer Jam 2007
- Studio albums: 4
- Singles: 48
- Collaborative albums: 3
- Mixtapes: 2
- Promotional singles: 7

The discography of American rapper Birdman consists of four studio albums, three collaborative albums, two mixtapes, 23 music videos, 48 singles, including 23 as a featured artist, and 7 promotional singles. In 2002, Birdman released his debut studio album Birdman under the stage name Baby. It peaked at number 24 on the US Billboard 200, spending 23 weeks on the chart. Three singles were released from the album; the first, "Do That...", reached number 33 on the US Billboard Hot 100, and the second, "What Happened to That Boy", reached number 45 on the same chart. The third single, "Baby You Can Do It", only charted on the US Hot R&B/Hip-Hop Singles Sales chart. In 2003, Birdman collaborated with singer Ginuwine on the single "Hell Yeah" and rapper Bow Wow on the single "Let's Get Down", which reached numbers 17 and 14 respectively on the Hot 100.

In 2005, Birdman released his second album Fast Money. It peaked at number 9 on the Billboard 200, and the album's two singles, "Get Your Shine On" and "Neck of the Woods", both charted in the top 75 of the US Hot R&B/Hip-Hop Songs chart. In 2006, Birdman released Like Father, Like Son, a collaboration album with fellow rapper Lil Wayne. It peaked at number three on the Billboard 200 and topped the Top R&B/Hip-Hop Albums and Top Rap Albums charts. Like Father, Like Son produced four singles, including "Stuntin' Like My Daddy", which peaked at number 21 on the Hot 100. Birdman's third studio album 5 * Stunna was released in 2007, and included the singles "Pop Bottles" – which peaked at number 38 on the Hot 100 – "100 Million" and "I Run This".

Birdman's fourth studio album Priceless was released in 2009. It peaked at number 33 on the Billboard 200, number 5 on the Top R&B/Hip-Hop Albums chart and number 3 on the Top Rap Albums chart. Priceless included four singles; "Always Strapped", which peaked at number 54 on the Hot 100, "Written on Her", "Money to Blow", which peaked at number 26 on the Hot 100 and was certified platinum by the Recording Industry Association of America (RIAA), and "4 My Town (Play Ball)", which peaked at number 92 on the Hot 100. In 2010, Birdman, Lil Wayne and singer Jay Sean appeared on the Kevin Rudolf single "I Made It (Cash Money Heroes)", which reached number 21 on the Hot 100 and charted in Australia, New Zealand and the United Kingdom. Since 2010, Birdman has also released the singles "Loyalty", "Fire Flame", "I Get Money", "Y.U. Mad" and "Born Stunna", all of which have reached the top 65 of the Hot R&B/Hip-Hop Songs chart.

== Albums ==
=== Studio albums ===
List of studio albums, with selected chart positions and certifications
Title	Album details	Peak chart positions			Certifications
Title	Album details	US	US R&B	US Rap	Certifications
Birdman	Released: November 26, 2002; Label: Cash Money, Universal; Format: CD, LP, cassette, digital download	24	4	—	RIAA: Gold
Fast Money	Released: June 21, 2005; Label: Cash Money, Universal; Format: CD, LP, digital download	9	4	2	
5 * Stunna	Released: December 11, 2007; Label: Cash Money, Universal; Format: CD, digital download	18	3	2	
Priceless	Released: November 23, 2009; Label: Cash Money, Universal Motown; Format: CD, digital download	33	6	3	
"—" denotes a recording that did not chart.

=== Collaborative albums ===
List of collaborative albums, with selected chart positions and certifications
Title	Album details	Peak chart positions			Certifications
Title	Album details	US	US R&B	US Rap	Certifications
Like Father, Like Son (with Lil Wayne)	Released: October 31, 2006; Label: Cash Money, Universal; Format: CD, digital download	3	1	1	RIAA: Gold
Rich Gang (with Rich Gang)	Released: July 23, 2013; Label: Young Money, Cash Money, Republic; Format: CD, digital download	9	2	2	
Just Another Gangsta (with Juvenile)	Released: March 29, 2019; Label: Cash Money; Format: Digital download	—	—	—	
"—" denotes a recording that did not chart.

=== Independent albums ===
Title	Album details
I Need A Bag of Dope (as B-32)	Released: 1993; Label: Cash Money; Format: Cassette

== Mixtapes ==
List of mixtapes, with selected chart positions
Title	Mixtape details	Peak chart positions		
Title	Mixtape details	US	US R&B	US Rap
Billionaire Minds (with Mack Maine)	Released: November 1, 2011; Label: Self-released; Format: Digital download	—	—	—
Rich Gang: All Stars	Released: February 16, 2013; Label: Cash Money; Format: Digital download	—	—	—
The H: The Lost Album Vol. 1 (with Rick Ross)	Released: May 23, 2013; Label: Cash Money, Maybach; Format: Digital download	—	—	—
Rich Gang: Tha Tour Pt. 1 (with Young Thug and Rich Homie Quan as Rich Gang)	Released: September 29, 2014; Label: Cash Money; Format: Digital download	—	—	—
Lost At Sea (with Jacquees)	Released: May 27, 2016; Label: Cash Money; Format: Digital download	—	—	—
Lost At Sea 2 (with Jacquees)	Released: November 16, 2018; Label: Cash Money; Format: Digital download	—	—	—
From the Bayou (with YoungBoy Never Broke Again)	Released: December 10, 2021; Label: Cash Money, Never Broke Again, Republic, Atlantic; Format: Digital download	19	9	4
"—" denotes a recording that did not chart or was not released in that territory.

== Singles ==
=== As lead artist ===
List of singles as lead artist, with selected chart positions and certifications, showing year released and album name
Title	Year	Peak chart positions				Certifications	Album
Title	Year	US	US R&B	US Rap	CAN	Certifications	Album
"Do That..." (featuring P. Diddy, Mannie Fresh and Tateeze)	2002	33	21	10	—		Birdman
"What Happened to That Boy" (featuring Clipse)	2002	45	14	11	—		Birdman
"Baby You Can Do It" (featuring Toni Braxton)	2003	—	73 (Note: "Baby You Can Do It" did not enter the Hot R&B/Hip-Hop Songs chart, but peaked at number 73 on the Hot R&B/Hip-Hop Singles Sales chart.)	—	—		Birdman
"Get Your Shine On" (featuring Lil Wayne)	2004	—	65	—	—		Fast Money
"Neck of the Woods" (featuring Lil Wayne)	2005	—	71	—	—		Fast Money
"Stuntin' Like My Daddy" (with Lil Wayne)	2006	21	7	5	—	RIAA: Platinum	Like Father, Like Son
"Leather So Soft" (with Lil Wayne)	2006	— (Note: "Leather So Soft" did not enter the Billboard Hot 100, but peaked at number 18 on the Bubbling Under Hot 100 Singles chart.)	—	—	—		Like Father, Like Son
"Know What I'm Doin'" (with Lil Wayne featuring Rick Ross and T-Pain)	2007	—	58	22	—		Like Father, Like Son
"You Ain't Know" (with Lil Wayne)	2007	—	56	—	—		Like Father, Like Son
"Pop Bottles" (featuring Lil Wayne)	2007	38	15	6	—	RIAA: Platinum	5 * Stunna
"100 Million" (featuring Young Jeezy, Rick Ross and Lil Wayne)	2007	— (Note: "100 Million" did not enter the Billboard Hot 100, but peaked at number 18 on the Bubbling Under Hot 100 Singles chart.)	69	—	—		5 * Stunna
"I Run This" (featuring Lil Wayne)	2008	— (Note: "I Run This" did not enter the Billboard Hot 100, but peaked at number 10 on the Bubbling Under Hot 100 Singles chart.)	69	—	—	RIAA: Gold	5 * Stunna
"Always Strapped" (featuring Lil Wayne)	2009	54	10	5	—	RIAA: Gold	Priceless
"Written on Her" (featuring Jay Sean)	2009	— (Note: "Written on Her" did not enter the Billboard Hot 100, but peaked at number 19 on the Bubbling Under Hot 100 Singles chart.)	—	17	—		Priceless
"Money to Blow" (featuring Drake and Lil Wayne)	2009	26	2	2	—	RIAA: Platinum	Priceless
"4 My Town (Play Ball)" (featuring Drake and Lil Wayne)	2009	90	37	17	—		Priceless
"Loyalty" (featuring Lil Wayne and Tyga)	2010	— (Note: "Loyalty" did not enter the Billboard Hot 100, but peaked at number 7 on the Bubbling Under Hot 100 Singles chart.)	61	25	—		Non-album singles
"Fire Flame" (featuring Lil Wayne)	2010	64	28	14	71		Non-album singles
"I Get Money" (featuring Lil Wayne, Mack Maine and T-Pain)	2011	—	63	—	—		Non-album singles
"Y.U. Mad" (featuring Nicki Minaj and Lil Wayne)	2011	68	46	25	—		Non-album singles
"Born Stunna" (featuring Rick Ross)	2012	—	45	24	—		Non-album singles
"B-Boyz" (with Mack Maine, featuring Kendrick Lamar, Ace Hood and DJ Khaled)	2012	—	—	—	—		Billionaire Minds
"Dark Shades" (featuring Lil Wayne and Mack Maine)	2012	—	—	—	—		Non-album singles
"Shoutout" (featuring French Montana and Gudda Gudda)	2012	—	—	—	—		Non-album singles
"Respek"	2016	—	—	—	—		Non-album singles
"Stunnaman" (with Roddy Ricch featuring Lil Wayne)	2021	—	—	—	—		Non-album singles
"—" denotes a recording that did not chart or was not released in that territory.

=== As featured artist ===
List of singles as featured artist, with selected chart positions and certifications, showing year released and album name
Title	Year	Peak chart positions										Certifications	Album
Title	Year	US	US R&B	US Rap	AUS	CAN	IRL	NLD	NOR	NZ	UK	Certifications	Album
"Shine" (Lil Wayne featuring Birdman, Mickey and Mack 10)	2001	96	39	—	—	—	—	—	—	—	—		Lights Out
"Bigger Business" (Swizz Beatz featuring Birdman, Jadakiss, Cassidy, Snoop Dogg, P. Diddy, Ron Isley and TQ)	2002	—	72	—	—	—	—	—	—	—	—		Swizz Beatz Presents G.H.E.T.T.O. Stories
"Hell Yeah" (Ginuwine featuring Birdman)	2003	17	16	—	—	—	—	38	—	—	27		The Senior
"Too Much for Me" (DJ Kayslay featuring Nas, Foxy Brown, Birdman and Ameriie)	2003	—	53	—	—	—	—	—	—	—	—		Streetsweeper Vol. 1
"Let's Get Down" (Bow Wow featuring Birdman)	2003	14	12	6	50	—	—	97	—	—	93		Unleashed
"Put Your Drinks Down" (Drag-On featuring DMX, Eve, Jadakiss, Birdman and TQ)	2003	—	80	—	—	—	—	—	—	—	—		Hell and Back
"Bounce Back" (Juvenile featuring Birdman)	2004	—	85	—	—	—	—	—	—	—	—		Juve the Great
"I Got Them" (Yo Gotti featuring Lil Wayne and Birdman)	2006	—	—	—	—	—	—	—	—	—	—		Back 2 da Basics
"Tuck Ya Ice" (Trick Daddy featuring Birdman)	2006	—	90	—	—	—	—	—	—	—	—		Back by Thug Demand
"Make It Rain" (Remix) (Fat Joe featuring Lil Wayne, R. Kelly, T.I., Birdman, Rick Ross and Ace Mac)	2007	—	—	—	—	—	—	—	—	—	—		Non-album single
"We Takin' Over" (DJ Khaled featuring Akon, T.I., Rick Ross, Fat Joe, Birdman and Lil Wayne)	2007	28	26	11	—	92	—	—	—	—	—	RIAA: Platinum; MC: Gold	We the Best
"I'm a G" (Lil' Keke featuring Birdman)	2007	—	75	—	—	—	—	—	—	—	—		Loved by Few, Hated by Many
"Foolish" (Remix) (Shawty Lo featuring DJ Khaled, Birdman, Rick Ross and Jim Jones)	2008	—	—	—	—	—	—	—	—	—	—		Non-album single
"Haterz" (Glasses Malone featuring Lil Wayne and Birdman)	2008	—	—	—	—	—	—	—	—	—	—		Beach Cruiser
"Big Balla" (Mack 10 featuring Glasses Malone and Birdman)	2008	—	—	—	—	—	—	—	—	—	—		Soft White
"Go" (Triple C's featuring Birdman and Schife)	2009	—	85	—	—	—	—	—	—	—	—		Custom Cars & Cycles
"Sun Come Up" (Glasses Malone featuring T-Pain, Rick Ross and Birdman)	2009	—	94	—	—	—	—	—	—	—	—		Beach Cruiser
"I Made It (Cash Money Heroes)" (Kevin Rudolf featuring Birdman, Jay Sean and Lil Wayne)	2010	21	—	—	4	44	21	—	13	4	37	RIAA: Platinum; ARIA: Platinum	To the Sky
"Money Talks" (St. Lunatics featuring Birdman)	2010	—	—	—	—	—	—	—	—	—	—		City Free
"Original" (Mystikal featuring Birdman and Lil Wayne)	2011	—	80	—	—	—	—	—	—	—	—		Original
"Champions" (Kevin Rudolf featuring Limp Bizkit, Birdman and Lil Wayne)	2012	—	—	—	—	—	—	—	—	—	—		Non-album single
"Tapout" (Rich Gang featuring Lil Wayne, Birdman, Mack Maine, Nicki Minaj and Future)	2013	44	10	8	—	—	—	—	—	—	—	RIAA: Gold	Rich Gang
"We Been On" (Rich Gang featuring R. Kelly, Birdman and Lil Wayne)	2013	—	—	—	—	—	—	—	—	—	—		Rich Gang
"She Tried" (Remix) (P.A.P.I. featuring Lil Wayne, Ja Rule and Birdman)	2013	—	—	—	—	—	—	—	—	—	—		Non-album single
"We Alright" (Young Money featuring Euro, Birdman and Lil Wayne)	2014	—	— (Note: "We Alright" did not enter the Hot R&B/Hip-Hop Songs chart, but peaked at number 6 on the Bubbling Under R&B/Hip-Hop Singles chart.)	—	—	—	—	—	—	—	—		Young Money: Rise of an Empire
"Movin'" (Mohombi featuring Birdman, KMC and Caskey)	2014	—	—	—	—	—	—	—	—	—	—		Universe
"High Off My Love" (Paris Hilton featuring Birdman)	2015	—	—	—	—	—	—	—	—	—	—		Non-album single
"—" denotes a recording that did not chart or was not released in that territory.

=== Promotional singles ===
List of promotional singles, with selected chart positions, showing year released and album name
Title	Year	Peak chart positions		Album
Title	Year	US	US R&B/HH	Album
"I'm So Hood" (Remix) (DJ Khaled featuring Young Jeezy, Ludacris, Busta Rhymes, Big Boi, Lil Wayne, Fat Joe, Birdman and Rick Ross)	2007	—	—	We the Best
"Tennessee" (Kevin Rudolf featuring Birdman)	2008	—	—	Non-album single
"Southside" (featuring Lil Wayne)	2009	—	— (Note: "Southside" did not enter the Hot R&B/Hip-Hop Songs chart, but peaked at number 8 on the Bubbling Under R&B/Hip-Hop Singles chart.)	Priceless
"Like This, Like That" (Jay Sean featuring Birdman)	2011	—	—	Hit the Lights
"Ima Boss" (Remix) (Meek Mill featuring T.I., Birdman, Lil Wayne, DJ Khaled, Rick Ross and Swizz Beatz)	2012	51	16	Non-album single
"Bugatti" (Remix) (Ace Hood featuring Wiz Khalifa, T.I., Meek Mill, French Montana, 2 Chainz, Future, DJ Khaled and Birdman)	2013	—	—	Trials & Tribulations
"100 Favors" (Rich Gang featuring Detail, Birdman and Kendrick Lamar)	2013	—	—	Rich Gang
"—" denotes a recording that did not chart.

== Other charted and certified songs ==
List of songs, with selected chart positions, showing year released and album name
Title	Year	Peak chart positions		Certifications	Album
Title	Year	US	US R&B/HH	Certifications	Album
"I'm a D-Boy" (Lil Wayne featuring Birdman)	2006	—	— (Note: "I'm a D-Boy" did not enter the Hot R&B/Hip-Hop Songs chart, but peaked at number 30 on the Hot R&B/Hip-Hop Singles Sales chart.)		Tha Carter II
"Hold U Down" (Bun B featuring Trey Songz, Mike Jones and Birdman)	2006	—	— (Note: "Hold U Down" did not enter the Hot R&B/Hip-Hop Songs chart, but peaked at number 6 on the Bubbling Under R&B/Hip-Hop Singles chart.)		Trill
"Mouth Full of Golds" (Gucci Mane featuring Birdman)	2011	—	93		The Return of Mr. Zone 6
"We'll Be Fine" (Drake featuring Birdman)	2011	89	—		Take Care
"Constantly Hating" (Young Thug featuring Birdman)	2015	—	— (Note: "Constantly Hating" did not enter the Hot R&B/Hip-Hop Songs chart, but peaked at number 5 on the Bubbling Under R&B/Hip-Hop Singles chart.)		Barter 6
"We Poppin" (YoungBoy Never Broke Again featuring Birdman)	2018	— (Note: "We Poppin" did not chart on the Billboard Hot 100, but peaked at number 10 on the Bubbling Under Hot 100 Singles chart.)	—	RIAA: Platinum	Until Death Call My Name
"Heart & Soul" (with YoungBoy Never Broke Again)	2021	— (Note: "Heart & Soul" did not chart on the Billboard Hot 100, but peaked at number one on the Bubbling Under Hot 100 Singles chart.)	29	RIAA: Gold	From the Bayou
"Black Ball" (with YoungBoy Never Broke Again)	2021	93	31	RIAA: Platinum	From the Bayou
"—" denotes a recording that did not chart.

== Guest appearances ==
List of non-single guest appearances, with other performing artists, showing year released and album name
Title	Year	Other artist(s)	Album
"U.P.T."	1998	Juvenile, Hot Boys	400 Degreez
"Never Had Shit"	1999	Juvenile, B.G., Turk	Tha G-Code
"Look at Me"	1999	E-40, Lil Wayne, Juvenile, B.G.	Charlie Hustle: The Blueprint of a Self-Made Millionaire
"Flamboastin'"	2000	E-40	Loyalty and Betrayal
"Get Your Hustle On"	2001	Juvenile	Project English
"They Lied"	2001	Juvenile	Project English
"White Girl"	2001	Juvenile, Lil Wayne	Project English
"Set It Off" (Radio Remix)	2001	Juvenile, Lil Wayne, Turk	Project English
"It's All the Same"	2001	The Click, WC	Money & Muscle
"Gangsta and Pimps"	2002	Lil Wayne	500 Degreez
"What Does Life Mean to Me"	2002	Lil Wayne, TQ	500 Degreez
"Grindin'" (Remix)	2002	Clipse, Lil Wayne, N.O.R.E.	Lord Willin'
"Bust at You"	2002	Fat Joe, Scarface, Tony Sunshine	Loyalty
"Let Me See Ya Do Your Thang"	2002	Yung Wun	Swizz Beatz Presents G.H.E.T.T.O. Stories
"Ride Tonight"	2003	Boo & Gotti, Jazze Pha	Perfect Timing
"Hot Shit"	2003	Boo & Gotti, Mikkey, Lac, Stone	Perfect Timing
"Intro"	2003	Lil Wayne	SQ6
"Lil' Daddy"	2003	Juvenile	Juve the Great
"Did You Miss Me"	2004	Petey Pablo, TQ	Still Writing in My Diary: 2nd Entry
"Off the Chain"	2004	Teena Marie	La Doña
"We Don't"	2004	Lil Wayne	Tha Carter
"Get Down"	2004	Lil Wayne	Tha Carter
"Only Way"	2004	Lil Wayne	Tha Carter
"Go with Me"	2004	Mannie Fresh	The Mind of Mannie Fresh
"I'm a D-Boy"	2005	Lil Wayne	Tha Carter II
"Hold U Down"	2005	Bun B, Trey Songz, Mike Jones	Trill
"Girls Go Crazy"	2005	R. Kelly	TP.3 Reloaded
"We Fly High" (Remix)	2006	Jim Jones, T.I., Diddy, Juelz Santana, Young Dro	A Dipset X-Mas
"Still Fly"	2006	DJ Khaled, Chop	Listennn... the Album
"A Bay Bay" (The Ratchet Remix)	2007	Hurricane Chris, The Game, Lil Boosie, E-40, Angie Locc, Jadakiss	51/50 Ratchet
"S on My Chest"	2007	DJ Khaled, Lil Wayne	We the Best
"Pricele$$"	2008	Flo Rida	Mail on Sunday
"A Miracle"	2008	Webbie, Rick Ross	Savage Life 2
"Getting It" (Remix)	2008	Mr. Capone-E, Big Steele, Fingazz	Diary of a G
"Blood Money"	2008	DJ Khaled, Brisco, Ace Hood, Rick Ross	We Global
"Speedin'" (We the Best Remix)	2008	Rick Ross, R. Kelly, DJ Khaled, Plies, Busta Rhymes, Webbie, Gorilla Zoe, Fat Joe, Torch, Gunplay, Flo Rida, Brisco, Lil Wayne	The Flo Rida Cash Cartel
"Tennessee"	2008	Kevin Rudolf	In the City
"Let It Rock" (Remix)	2009	Mack Maine, Kevin Rudolf, Lil Wayne	This is Just a Mixtape
"This Nigga Here"	2009	Ace Hood, Schife	Ruthless
"Go"	2009	Triple C's, Schife	Custom Cars & Cycles
"Always Strapped"	2009	Yo Gotti, All-Star, Lil Wayne	Dope Boy Flows
"No Ceilings"	2009	Lil Wayne	No Ceilings
"Fuck da Bullshit"	2009	Young Money	We Are Young Money
"Wasted" (Remix)	2009	Gucci Mane, Lil Wayne, Jadakiss	The State vs. Radric Davis
"Follow My Moves"	2010	Freeway, Jake One	The Stimulus Package
"Rockin' All My Chains On"	2010	DJ Khaled, Bun B, Soulja Boy, Schife	Victory
"Checking My Hoes"	2010	Too Short, Jazze Pha	Still Blowin'
"Stay Gettin' It"	2010	Ta Smallz	Who Killed My Mama?!
"Do It Bigger"	2010	Lil' Phat, Webbie	Trill Entertainment Presents: All or Nothing
"I'm Number 1"	2010	Nelly, DJ Khaled	5.0
"Mouth Full of Golds"	2011	Gucci Mane	The Return of Mr. Zone 6
"10 Bricks"	2011	Rick Ross	Ashes to Ashes
"Speech"	2011	T-Pain	Prevolver
"Can't Stop"	2011	DJ Khaled, T-Pain	We the Best Forever
"Welcome to My Hood" (Remix)	2011	DJ Khaled, Ludacris, T-Pain, Busta Rhymes, Twista, Mavado, Ace Hood, Fat Joe, Game, Jadakiss, Bun B, Waka Flocka Flame	We the Best Forever
"Yung Stunna"	2011	Game	Purp & Patron: The Hangover
"Can You Believe It"	2011	Game, Lil Wayne	Hood Morning (No Typo): Candy Coronas
"I Got Some Money on Me"	2011	Lil Wayne	Tha Carter IV
"Trump"	2011	Young Jeezy	The Real Is Back 2
"Love"	2011	Jay Sean	The Mistress
"We'll Be Fine"	2011	Drake	Take Care
"Slangin' Birds"	2011	2 Chainz, Young Jeezy, Yo Gotti	T.R.U. REALigion
"Last Breath"	2012	Rick Ross, Meek Mill	Rich Forever
"Birdman Interlude"	2012	Tyga	Careless World: Rise of the Last King
"Everything's a Go" (Remix)	2012	French Montana, Fabolous, Jadakiss, Wale	none
"Anytime You Ready"	2012	Gucci Mane	I'm Up
"Get Lost"	2012	Gucci Mane	I'm Up
"I Don't See 'Em"	2012	DJ Khaled, Ace Hood, 2 Chainz	Kiss the Ring
"So Dedicated"	2012	Lil Wayne	Dedication 4
"My Audemars"	2012	DJ Drama, Meek Mill, Gucci Mane	Quality Street Music
"It Ain't My Fault"	2012	Compton Menace	Menace 2 Society Vol. 2
"Too Many Comas"	2012	Young Jeezy	It's tha World
"Picture Perfect"	2012	Juvenile, Lil Wayne	Juvie Tuesdays
"Love"	2012	Jay Sean	Hit the Lights
"Billionaire Minds"	2013	Future	F.B.G.: The Movie
"5 in the Morning"	2013	Mack Maine	Freestyle 102: No Pens or Pads
"Colombia" (Remix)	2013	Young Scooter, Gucci Mane, Rick Ross	none
"Phantom"	2013	Bangladesh, 2 Chainz	Ponzi Scheme
"Sky High"	2013	Jae Millz, Gucci Mane, Khalil	Property of Potentness 2
"Karate Chop" (Remix)	2013	Future, Rick Ross, French Montana	none
"Trap House"	2013	French Montana, Rick Ross	Excuse My French
"I Luv This Shit" (Remix)	2013	August Alsina	none
"Dreams Come True"	2013	Yo Gotti, Mack Maine, Ace Hood	Rich Gang
"Bigger Than Life"	2013	Chris Brown, Tyga, Lil Wayne	Rich Gang
"Everyday"	2013	Cory Gunz, Busta Rhymes, Mystikal	Rich Gang
"Angel"	2013	Lil Wayne, Mystikal, Ace Hood, Jae Millz, Gudda Gudda, Mack Maine	Rich Gang
"Sunshine"	2013	Limp Bizkit, Flo Rida, Caskey	Rich Gang
"Paint tha Town"	2013	Game, Lil Wayne	Rich Gang
"Have It Your Way"	2013	T.I., Lil Wayne	Rich Gang
"Way I'm Ballin"	2013	Lil Wayne, Future, Mack Maine	Dedication 5
"Stack on My Belt"	2013	Rick Ross, Wale, Whole Slab	Self Made Vol. 3
"I'm Leanin (Intro)"	2013	Meek Mill, Travis Scott, Diddy	Dreamchasers 3
"Cash Money"	2013	Rich Homie Quan	I Promise I Will Never Stop Going In
"Murcielago (Doors Go Up)"	2013	DJ Khaled, Meek Mill	Suffering from Success
"Fresher Than Ever"	2014	Gudda Gudda, Jae Millz, Flow, Mack Maine	Young Money: Rise of an Empire
"Givenchy"	2014	Young Thug	Rich Gang: Tha Tour Pt. 1
"Flava"	2014	Young Thug, Rich Homie Quan	Rich Gang: Tha Tour Pt. 1
"Imma Ride"	2014	Young Thug, Yung Ralph	Rich Gang: Tha Tour Pt. 1
"Constantly Hating"	2015	Young Thug	Barter 6
"Knocked Off"	2015	Young Thug	Barter 6
"Green Hearted"	2018	Robb Banks	Molly World
We Poppin	2018	YoungBoy Never Broke Again	Until Death Call My Name
"Big Stunna"	2022	Quavo, Takeoff	Only Built for Infinity Links

== Music videos ==
=== As lead artist ===
List of music videos, showing year released and director
Title	Year	Director(s)
"Do That..." (featuring P. Diddy and Mannie Fresh)	2002	Dave Meyers
"What Happened to That Boy" (featuring Clipse)	2002	Benny Boom
"Baby You Can Do It" (featuring Toni Braxton)	2003	David Palmer
"Neck of the Woods" (featuring Lil Wayne)	2005	David Palmer
"Stuntin' Like My Daddy" (with Lil Wayne)	2006	none
"Leather So Soft" (with Lil Wayne)	2006	Aaron Courseault
"You Ain't Know" (with Lil Wayne)	2007	David Palmer
"Pop Bottles" (featuring Lil Wayne)	2007	Benny Boom
"100 Million" (featuring Young Jeezy, Rick Ross and Lil Wayne)	2007	Gil Green
"I Run This" (featuring Lil Wayne)	2008	Dale Resteghini
"Always Strapped" (Remix) (featuring Lil Wayne and Mack Maine)	2009	Lil X
"Written on Her" (featuring Jay Sean)	2009	none
"Money to Blow" (featuring Drake and Lil Wayne)	2009	Gil Green
"4 My Town (Play Ball)" (featuring Drake and Lil Wayne)	2009	Gil Green
"Loyalty" (featuring Lil Wayne and Tyga)	2010	David Rousseau, John Babl
"Fire Flame"	2010	Gil Green
"Fire Flame" (featuring Lil Wayne)	2011	Gil Green
"I Get Money" (featuring Lil Wayne, Mack Maine and T-Pain)	2011	Jeffrey Panzer, David Rousseau
"Y.U. Mad" (featuring Nicki Minaj and Lil Wayne)	2011	Gil Green
"B-Boyz" (featuring Mack Maine, Kendrick Lamar, Ace Hood and DJ Khaled)	2012	Derick G
"Dark Shades" (featuring Lil Wayne and Mack Maine)	2012	Colin Tilley
"Born Stunna" (featuring Rick Ross)	2012	Derick G
"Shout Out" (featuring French Montana and Gudda Gudda)	2012	Colin Tilley

== See also ==
- Big Tymers discography
- Cash Money Millionaires discography
