= Lil Wayne videography =

Lil Wayne video discography
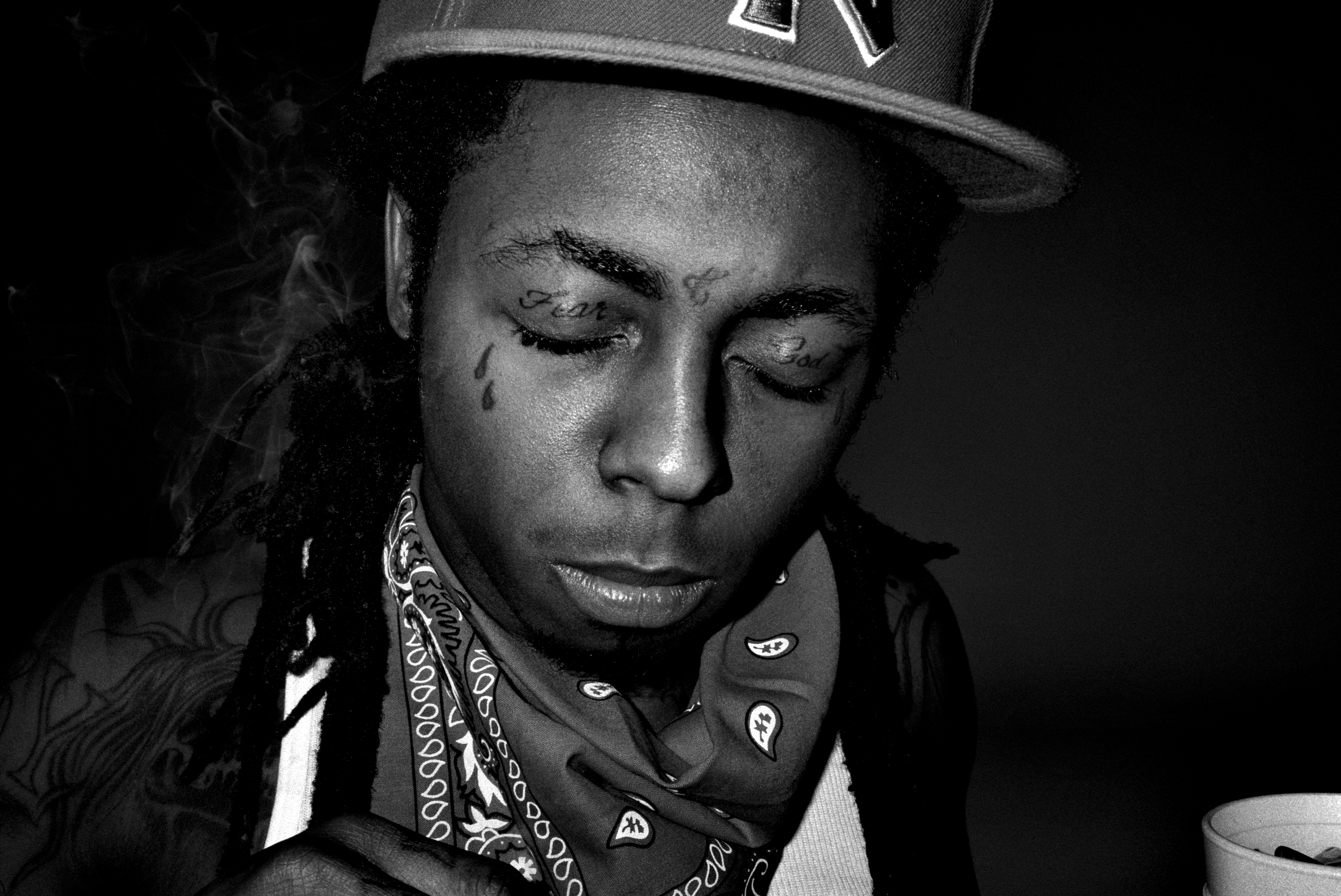
- Music videos: 38
- Featured Music Video: 98

American rapper Lil Wayne has released one song video, working with many directors, as well as featuring in many other artists music videos as well. Before Lil Wayne went to jail for eight months in 2010 he shot 20 to 30 music videos to keep his fans interested in his music.

== As lead artist ==
Title	Year	Director(s)
"Tha Block Is Hot"	1999	Dave Meyers
"Respect Us" (featuring Juvenile)	2000	Terry Heller
"Get Off the Corner"	2000	Terry Heller
"Everything"	2001	Bille Woodruff
"Shine" (featuring Big Tymers, Mack 10 and Mickey)	2001	Bille Woodruff
"Way of Life" (featuring Big Tymers & TQ)	2002	Scott Kalvert
"Where You At"	2002	Scott Kalvert
"Bring It Back"	2004	David Palmer
"Earthquake" (featuring Jazze Pha)	2004	David Palmer
"Go D.J."	2004	Life Garland
"Get Something" (featuring Mannie Fresh)	2004	Terry Heller
"Fireman"	2005	Aaron Courseault
"Hustler Musik"/"Money on My Mind"	2006	Benny Boom
"Shooter" (featuring Robin Thicke)	2006	Benny Boom
"The Only Reason" (featuring Sizzla and T-Streets)	2007	David Palmer, James Kniest
"Gossip"	2007	Matt Alonzo
"Money, Cars, Clothes, Hoes" (featuring T-Streets)	2007	Matt Alonzo
"Lollipop" (featuring Static Major)	2008	Gil Green
"A Milli"	2008	Gil Green
"Got Money" (featuring T-Pain and Mack Maine)	2008	Gil Green
"Mrs. Officer"/"Comfortable" (featuring Bobby V)	2008	Gil Green
"Prom Queen" (featuring Shanell)	2009	Lil Wayne, Dave Meyers
"Money on My Mind"	2010	Jordan Tower
"On Fire"	2010	Chris Robinson
"Drop the World" (featuring Eminem)	2010	Chris Robinson
"Da Da Da"	2010	Chris Robinson
"Runnin'" (featuring Shanell)	2010	David Rousseau
"Knockout" (featuring Nicki Minaj)	2010	David Rousseau
"Get a Life"	2010	David Rousseau
"I'm Single"	2010	DJ Scoob Doo
"Steady Mobbin'" (featuring Gucci Mane)	2010	DJ Scoob Doo
"Ground Zero"	2010	DJ Scoob Doo
"I Am Not a Human Being"	2010	David Rousseau
"Pop Dat" (featuring Birdman)	2010	DJ Scoob Doo
"I Don't Like the Look of It" (featuring Gudda Gudda)	2010	Colin Tilley
"6 Foot 7 Foot" (featuring Cory Gunz)	2011	Hype Williams
"John" (featuring Rick Ross)	2011	Colin Tilley
"How to Love"	2011	Chris Robinson
"Mirror" (featuring Bruno Mars)	2012	Antoine Fuqua
"My Homies Still" (featuring Big Sean)	2012	Parris
"Same Damn Tune"	2012	DJ Scoob Doo
"No Worries" (featuring Detail)	2012	Colin Tilley
"Love Me" (featuring Drake and Future)	2013	Hannah Lux Davis
"Rich as Fuck" (featuring 2 Chainz)	2013	Parris
"God Bless Amerika"	2013	Eif Rivera
"Krazy"	2014	Collin Tilley
"Grindin" (featuring Drake)	2014	
"CoCo Freestyle"	2015	Eif Rivera
"Hollyweezy"	2015	Eif Rivera
"Selsun Blue"	2015	RobDeGruy
"Uproar"	2018	Mills Miller
"Don't Cry" (featuring XXXTentacion)	2019	Jay and Georgio Rodriguez
"Mama Mia"	2020	
"Piano Trap" / "Not Me"	2020	
"I Don't Sleep" (featuring Takeoff)	2020	
"NFL"	2020	
"Green & Yellow"	2021	
"Kant Nobody" (featuring DMX)	2023	

== Collaboration videos ==
List of music videos, with directors, showing year released
Title	Year	Director(s)
"We on Fire" (with Hot Boys)	1999	none
"I Need a Hot Girl" (with Hot Boys)	1999	none
"Project Bitch" (with Cash Money Millionaires)	2000	none
"Undisputed" (with Cash Money Millionaires)	2002	none
"Stuntin' Like My Daddy" (with Birdman)	2006	none
"Leather So Soft" (with Birdman)	2006	Aaron Courseault
"You Ain't Know" (with Birdman)	2006	David Palmer
"Every Girl" (with Young Money)	2009	none
"BedRock" (with Young Money featuring Lloyd)	2009	Dayo
"We Are the World 25 for Haiti" (with Artists for Haiti)	2010	none
"Roger That" (with Young Money)	2010	Phenom
"Tapout" (with Rich Gang featuring Lil Wayne, Birdman, Mack Maine, Nicki Minaj and Future)	2013	Hannah Lux Davis
"We Been On" (with Rich Gang featuring R. Kelly, Birdman and Lil Wayne)	2013	Hannah Lux Davis
"Nothing but Trouble" (Lil Wayne with Charlie Puth)	2016	
"Gotta Lotta" (with 2 Chainz)	2016	
"Bounce" (with 2 Chainz)	2016	
"Sucker for Pain" (with Logic, Imagine Dragons, X Ambassadors & Ty $ )	2016	
"MFN Right" (with 2 Chainz)	2016	
"No Frauds" (with Drake & Nicki Minaj)	2017	
"Lose" (with KSI)	2021	Troy Roscoe
"Feelin Like Tunechi" (with Rich the Kid)	2021	
"Trust Fund Babies" (with Rich the Kid)	2021	
"Oprah & Gayle" (with 2 Chainz featuring Benny the Butch)	2023	
"Transparency" (with 2 Chainz featuring Usher)	2023	
"Long Story Short" (with 2 Chainz)	2024	

== As featured artist ==
List of music videos, with directors, showing year released
Title	Year	Director(s)
"We Luv Stuntin'" (Big Tymers featuring Papa Reu and Lil Wayne)	1998	Carl Verne Pierre Verne
"Back That Thang Up" (Juvenile featuring Mannie Fresh and Lil Wayne)	1999	Dave Myers
"Hypnotize Cash Money" (Tear da Club Up Thugs featuring Hot Boys and Big Tymers)	1999	Marc Klasfeld
"Bling Bling" (B.G. featuring Hot Boys and Big Tymers)	1999	none
"Ballers (Remix)" (Project Pat featuring Hot Boys & Big Tymers)	1999	
"Number One Stunna" (Big Tymers featuring Lil Wayne, Turk and B.G.)	2000	Troy Smith
"I Know" (B.G. featuring Lil Wayne)	2000	none
"Hardball" (Lil Bow Wow featuring Lil Wayne, Lil Zane and Sammie)	2001	Chris Robinson
"Ride Out" (Mil featuring Lil Wayne, B.G. and Beanie Sigel)	2001	Sylvain White
"Anything 4 You" (Official featuring Lil Wayne)	2001	none
"Neva Get Enuf" (3LW featuring Lil Wayne)	2002	none
"Ain't It Man" (Boo & Gotti featuring Lil Wayne)	2003	David Palmer
"Soldier" (Destiny's Child featuring T.I. and Lil Wayne)	2004	Ray Kay
"Get Your Shine On" (Birdman featuring Lil Wayne)	2004	none
"Don't Trip" (Trina featuring Lil Wayne)	2005	Dr. Teeth
"Get It All Together" (Birdman featuring Lil Wayne)	2005	none
"You Know What" (Avant featuring Lil Wayne and Jermaine Dupri)	2005	Benny Boom
"I See Ya Lil Daddy" (Chopper Young City featuring Lil Wayne)	2005	none
"Tell Me" (Remix) (Bobby Valentino featuring Lil Wayne)	2005	Erik White
"Bird Call" (JR Writer featuring Cam'ron and Lil Wayne)	2005	none
"Neck of the Woods" (Birdman featuring Lil Wayne)	2005	David Palmer
"Make It Work for You" (Juelz Santana featuring Lil Wayne and Young Jeezy)	2005	none
"Suck It or Not" (Cam'ron featuring Lil Wayne)	2006	none
"Holla at Me" (DJ Khaled featuring Lil Wayne, Paul Wall, Fat Joe, Rick Ross and Pitbull)	2006	R. Malcolm Jones
"You" (Lloyd featuring Lil Wayne)	2006	none
"Where da Cash At" (Currensy featuring Lil Wayne and Remy Ma)	2006	none
"Gimme That" (Remix) (Chris Brown featuring Lil Wayne)	2006	Erik White
"Make It Rain" (Fat Joe featuring Lil Wayne)	2006	Chris Robinson
"Make It Rain" (Remix) (Fat Joe featuring R. Kelly, T.I., Lil Wayne, Birdman, Rick Ross and Ace Mac)	2006	Malcolm Jones
"We Takin' Over" (DJ Khaled featuring Akon, T.I., Rick Ross, Fat Joe, Birdman and Lil Wayne)	2007	Gil Green
"9mm"/Speaker (David Banner featuring Akon, Lil Wayne, and Snoop Dogg)	2007	Malcolm Jones
"Pop Bottles" (Birdman featuring Lil Wayne and Jadakiss)	2007	Benny Boom
"I'm So Hood" (Remix) (DJ Khaled featuring Young Jeezy, Ludacris, Busta Rhymes, Big Boi, Lil Wayne, Fat Joe, Birdman and Rick Ross)	2007	Dayo, Rush
"100 Million" (Birdman featuring Young Jeezy, Rick Ross and Lil Wayne)	2007	Gil Green
"Duffle Bag Boy" (Playaz Circle featuring Lil Wayne)	2007	Chaka Zulu
"Uh-Ohhh!" (Ja Rule featuring Lil Wayne)	2007	none
"Sweetest Girl (Dollar Bill)" (Wyclef Jean featuring Akon, Lil Wayne and Niia)	2007	Chris Robinson
"Sweetest Girl (Dollar Bill)" (Remix) (Wyclef Jean featuring Akon, Lil Wayne, Raekwon and Niia)	2007	Chris Robinson
"Lock U Down" (Mýa featuring Lil Wayne)	2007	Benny Boom
"Black Republicans" (Juelz Santana featuring Lil Wayne)	2007	Jordan Tower
"In the Hood" (Brisco featuring Lil Wayne)	2007	Scott Franklin
"All My Life (In the Ghetto)" (Jay Rock featuring Lil Wayne)	2008	Michael "The Greek" Mihail, Jonathan Silver
"I Run This" (Birdman featuring Lil Wayne)	2008	Dale "Rage" Resteghini
"Let It Rock" (Kevin Rudolf featuring Lil Wayne)	2008	Justin Francis
"Girls Around the World" (Lloyd featuring Lil Wayne)	2008	Hype Williams
"My Life" (Game featuring Lil Wayne)	2008	Bryan Barber
"Can't Believe It" (T-Pain featuring Lil Wayne)	2008	Syndrome
"Shawty Say" (David Banner featuring Lil Wayne)	2008	Ulysses Terrero
"Official Girl" (Cassie featuring Lil Wayne)	2008	Chris Robinson
"Haterz" (Glasses Malone featuring Lil Wayne and Birdman)	2008	Life Garland
"I'm So Paid" (Akon featuring Lil Wayne and Young Jeezy)	2008	Gil Green
"Turnin' Me On" (Keri Hilson featuring Lil Wayne)	2008	Erik White
"Push" (Enrique Iglesias featuring Lil Wayne)	2008	Billy Woodruff
"Higher Than a Kite" (Nicki Minaj featuring Lil Wayne)	2008	Jordan Tower
"Unstoppable" (Kat Deluna featuring Lil Wayne)	2009	Tyrone Edmond
"Arab Money" (Remix) (Busta Rhymes featuring Ron Browz, Diddy, Swizz Beatz, Akon and Lil Wayne)	2009	Rik Cordero
"Respect My Conglomerate" (Busta Rhymes featuring Jadakiss and Lil Wayne)	2009	Chris Robinson
"Always Strapped" (Birdman featuring Lil Wayne and Mack Maine)	2009	Lil X
"Always Strapped" (Remix) (Birdman featuring Lil Wayne, Rick Ross & Young Jeezy)	2009	Lil X, Kevin Layne, Jeff Panzer
"Down" (Jay Sean featuring Lil Wayne)	2009	Richard Pengelly
"Forever" (Drake featuring Kanye West, Lil Wayne and Eminem)	2009	Hype Williams
"So Sharp (Remix)" (Mack 10 featuring Rick Ross and Lil Wayne)	2009	K.C. Amos
"I Can Transform Ya" (Chris Brown featuring Lil Wayne and Swizz Beatz)	2009	Joseph Kahn
"4 My Town (Play Ball)" (Birdman featuring Drake & Lil Wayne)	2009	Gil Green
"Give It Up to Me" (Shakira featuring Lil Wayne & Timbaland)	2009	Sophie Muller
"So Good" (Remix) (Electrik Red featuring Lil Wayne)	2009	Sophie Muller
"Money to Blow" (Birdman featuring Drake and Lil Wayne)	2009	Gil Green
"I Made It (Cash Money Heroes)" (Kevin Rudolf featuring Birdman, Jay Sean and Lil Wayne)	2010	Jeff Panzer, David Rousseau
"Big Dawg" (Playaz Circle featuring Lil Wayne and Birdman)	2010	Dr. Teeth
"Blood Niggaz" (Menace featuring Lil Wayne, Mitchy Slick and Game)	2010	Dontay "Taydoe" Kidd
"Jump in the Air (Stay There)" (Erykah Badu featuring Lil Wayne)	2010	Erykah Badu
"Women Lie, Men Lie" (Yo Gotti featuring Lil Wayne)	2010	Benny Boom
"Inkredible" (Trae tha Truth featuring Lil Wayne and Rick Ross)	2010	Mr. Inkredible
"Tattoo Girl (Foreva)" (Detail featuring Lil Wayne, T-Pain and Travie McCoy)	2010	none
"Loyalty" (Birdman featuring Tyga and Lil Wayne)	2010	David Rousseau
"On the Wall" (Brisco featuring Lil Wayne)	2010	Jeffrey Elmont
"I'm on It" (Tyga featuring Lil Wayne)	2010	Colin Tilley
"Miss Me" (Drake featuring Lil Wayne)	2010	Anthony Mandler
"No Love" (Eminem featuring Lil Wayne)	2010	Chris Robinson
"Veteran's Day" (Rick Ross featuring Lil Wayne and Birdman)	2010	Spiff TV
"Need a Man" (Sons of 84 featuring Lil Wayne)	2010	Mills Miller
"Fire Flame" (Remix) (Birdman featuring Lil Wayne)	2011	Gil Green
"Home Run" (Juelz Santana featuring Lil Wayne)	2011	James Del Gatto
"Welcome to My Hood" (DJ Khaled featuring Rick Ross, Plies, Lil Wayne and T-Pain)	2011	Dayo
"Bow Chicka Wow Wow" (Mike Posner featuring Lil Wayne)	2011	Shane Drake
"Look at Me Now" (Chris Brown featuring Lil Wayne and Busta Rhymes)	2011	Colin Tilley
"Hit the Lights" (Jay Sean featuring Lil Wayne)	2011	Bille Woodruff
"Can a Drummer Get Some" (Travis Barker featuring Lil Wayne, Game, Swizz Beatz and Rick Ross)	2011	Syndrome
"Someone to Love Me (Naked)" (Mary J. Blige featuring Diddy and Lil Wayne)	2011	Colin Tilley
"Motivation" (Kelly Rowland featuring Lil Wayne)	2011	Sarah Chatfield
"Love Affair" (Lil Twist featuring Lil Wayne)	2011	Dayo
"I Get Money" (Birdman featuring Lil Wayne, Mack Maine and T-Pain)	2011	Jeffrey A. Panzer
"This Is What Rock N' Roll Looks Like" (Porcelain Black featuring Lil Wayne)	2011	Sanaa Hamri
"I'm Into You" (Jennifer Lopez featuring Lil Wayne)	2011	Melina Matsoukas
"Hustle Hard" (Remix) (Ace Hood featuring Rick Ross and Lil Wayne)	2011	Derick G
"Red Nation" (Game featuring Lil Wayne)	2011	Parris
"Ballin'" (Young Jeezy featuring Lil Wayne)	2011	Colin Tilley
"Dirty Dancer" (Enrique Iglesias featuring Usher and Lil Wayne)	2011	Yasha Malekzad, Jeff Dotson, Ethan Lader
"9 Piece" (Rick Ross featuring Lil Wayne)	2011	Gil Green
"I'm on One" (DJ Khaled featuring Drake, Rick Ross and Lil Wayne)	2011	Gil Green
"Finito" (N.O.R.E. featuring Pharrell and Lil Wayne)	2011	Spiff TV
"Y.U. Mad" (Birdman featuring Nicki Minaj and Lil Wayne)	2011	Gil Green
"Dedication to My Ex (Miss That)" (Lloyd featuring Lil Wayne & André 3000)	2011	Bryan Barber
"Strange Clouds" (B.o.B featuring Lil Wayne)	2011	Motion Family
"Martians vs. Goblins" (Game featuring Lil Wayne and Tyler, The Creator)	2011	Matt Alonzo
"The Motto" (Drake featuring Lil Wayne and Tyga)	2011	Lamar Taylor, Hyghly Alleyne
"Sleazy Remix 2.0 - Get Sleazier" (Kesha featuring Lil Wayne, Wiz Khalifa, T.I. and André 3000)	2012	Nicholaus Goossen
"Sweat" (Bow Wow featuring Lil Wayne)	2012	David Rousseau
"All Aboard" (Romeo Santos featuring Lil Wayne)	2012	Gil Green
"Pretty Lil' Heart" (Robin Thicke featuring Lil Wayne)	2012	Marc Klasfeld
"Original" (Mystikal featuring Lil Wayne and Birdman)	2012	Gil Green
"Faded" (Tyga featuring Lil Wayne)	2012	Colin Tilley
"HYFR (Hell Ya Fucking Right)" (Drake featuring Lil Wayne)	2012	Director X
"Take It to the Head" (DJ Khaled featuring Rick Ross, Nicki Minaj, Chris Brown and Lil Wayne)	2012	Colin Tilley
"Dark Shades" (Birdman featuring Lil Wayne and Mack Maine)	2012	Colin Tilley
"So Good" (Shanell featuring Lil Wayne and Drake)	2012	Director X
"I Can Only Imagine" (David Guetta featuring Chris Brown and Lil Wayne)	2012	Colin Tilley
"Pop That" (French Montana featuring Rick Ross, Drake and Lil Wayne)	2012	Parris
"Mirror" (Bobby Valentino featuring Lil Wayne)	2012	Rob Dade
"WTF" (Shawty Lo featuring Lil Wayne)	2012	Mr. Boomtown
"Enough of No Love" (Keyshia Cole featuring Lil Wayne)	2012	Benny Boom
"Hail Mary" (Trey Songz featuring Young Jeezy and Lil Wayne)	2012	Tremaine Neverson, Kevin Hart
"Lover" (PJ Morton featuring Lil Wayne)	2012	Jack Wallis
"Celebration" (Game featuring Chris Brown, Tyga, Wiz Khalifa and Lil Wayne)	2012	Matt Alonzo
"Bandz a Make Her Dance" (Juicy J featuring Lil Wayne and 2 Chainz)	2012	JR Saint
"60 Rackz" (Remix) (Jim Jones featuring Lil Wayne and T.W.O.)	2012	Clifton Bell
"Ball" (T.I. featuring Lil Wayne)	2012	Marc Klasfeld
"Yellow Tape" (Fat Joe featuring French Montana, Lil Wayne, ASAP Rocky and DJ Khaled)	2012	Eif Rivera
"Ice" (Kelly Rowland featuring Lil Wayne)	2012	Matthew Rolston
"Bitches & Bottles (Let's Get It Started)" (DJ Khaled featuring Future, T.I., Lil Wayne and Ace Hood)	2012	Gil Green
"She Don't Put It Down" (Joe Budden featuring Tank, Fabolous and Lil Wayne)	2013	Elf Rivera
"Scream & Shout" (Hit-Boy Remix) (will.i.am featuring Britney Spears, Hit-Boy, Lil Wayne, Waka Flocka Flame and Diddy)	2013	Ben Mor
"Celebrate" (Mack Maine featuring Lil Wayne and Talib Kweli)	2013	Parris
"High School" (Nicki Minaj featuring Lil Wayne)	2013	Benny Boom
"Yuck!" (2 Chainz featuring Lil Wayne)	2013	Alex Nazari
"Wit Me" (T.I. featuring Lil Wayne)	2013	Philly Fly Boy
"Commas" (L.E.P. Bogus Boys featuring Lil Wayne and Mase)	2013	Clifton Bell
"Hello" (Stafford Brothers featuring Christina Milian and Lil Wayne)	2013	Yasha Malekzad, Ali Zamani
"No New Friends" (DJ Khaled featuring Drake, Rick Ross and Lil Wayne)	2013	Colin Tilley
"We Outchea" (Ace Hood featuring Lil Wayne)	2013	Colin Tilley
"Ready rzo Go" (Limp Bizkit featuring Lil Wayne)	2013	Fred Durst
"Beware" (Big Sean featuring Jhené Aiko and Lil Wayne)	2013	Matthew Williams
"Good Time" (Paris Hilton featuring Lil Wayne)	2013	Hannah Lux Davis
"Thank You" (Busta Rhymes featuring Lil Wayne & da O.G.s)	2013	
"My Nigga Remix" (YG featuring Lil Wayne, Rich Homie Quan, Meek Mill & Nicki Minaj)	2014	
"Thug Cry" (Rick Ross featuring Lil Wayne)	2014	
"Joker" (Beth Sherburn featuring Lil Wayne)	2014	
"Only" (Nicki Minaj featuring Lil Wayne & Drake)	2014	
"Miss Mary Mack" (Juicy J featuring Lil Wayne & August Alsina)	2015	
"Brown Sugar" (Ray J featuring Lil Wayne)	2015	
"Just Right for Me" (Monica featuring Lil Wayne)	2015	
"How Many Times" (DJ Khaled featuring Lil Wayne, Chris Brown, Big Sean)	2015	Colin Tilley
"Bottom of the Bottle" (Curren$y featuring Lil Wayne & August Alsina)	2015	
"Lose It" (French Montana featuring Rick Ross & Lil Wayne)	2015	
"Why I Do It" (August Alsina featuring Lil Wayne)	2015	
"Do It" (O.T. Genasis featuring Lil Wayne)	2015	
"Do It" (Christina MIlian featuring Lil Wayne)	2015	
"Halfway (Remix)" (S-Bighty featuring Lil Wayne)	2016	Tough Town
"Finessing Remix" (Baby E featuring Lil Wayne)	2016	
"Let Me Love You" (Ariana Grande featuring Lil Wayne)	2016	
"No Problems" (Chance the Rapper featuring 2 Chainz and Lil Wayne)	2016	
"Bout That" (Jeezy featuring Lil Wayne)	2017	
"Running Back" (Wale featuring Lil Wayne)	2017	
"Heaven" (Raw Dizzy featuring Lil Wayne)	2017	
"Chico" (Roy Demeo featuring Lil Wayne)	2017	
"Location (Remix)" (Khalid featuring Kehlani & Lil Wayne)	2017	
"Good Form" (Nicki Minaj featuring Drizzy & Lil Wayne)	2017	
"I'm the One" (DJ Khaled featuring Lil Wayne & Chance the Rapper)	2017	
"Light My Body Up" (David Guetta featuring Nicki Minaj & Lil Wayne)	2017	Benny Boom
"Love u Better" (Ty $ featuring Lil Wayne & The-Dream)	2017	
"The Way I Are (Dance with Somebody) (Bebe Rexha featuring Lil Wayne)	2017	
"Go Crazy" (Jay Jones featuring Lil Wayne)	2018	
"Wit My Left" (Fendi P featuring Lil Wayne)	2018	
"P.O.M.S." (Swizz Beats featuring Lil Wayne)	2018	
"Hot Boy" (preme featuring Lil Wayne)	2018	
"Good Form (Remix)" (Nicki Minaj featuring Lil Wayne)	2018	
"Corazon" (GIMS featuring French Montana & Lil Wayne"	2018	
"Be Like Me" (Lil Pump featuring Lil Wayne)	2019	
"2 Dollar Bill" (2 Chainz featuring Lil Wayne & E-40)	2019	
"YUSO" (Kid Ink featuring Saweeeti & Lil Wayne)	2019	
"Talk to Me Crazy" (Euro featuring Lil Wayne)	2019	
"I Will Not Break" (Kevin Rudolf featuring Lil Wayne)	2019	
"Jealous" (DJ Khaled featuring Lil Weezy, Chris Brown, Big Sean)	2019	
"Sucka Free" (Jo'zzy featuring Lil Wayne)	2019	
"Pullin'" (Fat Joe & Dre featuring Lil Wayne)	2019	
"Ride Dat' (Birdman & Juvenile featuring Lil Wayne)	2019	
"Leaked (Remix) (Lil Tjay featuring Lil Wayne)	2019	
"Gimme Brain" (Travis Barker featuring Rick Ross & Lil Wayne)	2020	
"Money Maker" (2 Chainz featuring Lil Wayne)	2020	Bryan Barber
"School Shooter" (XXXTentacion featuring Lil Wayne)	2020	
"What's Poppin Remix" (Jack Harlow feat. Lil Wayne, DaBaby, Torey Lanez)	2020	Eif Rivera
"Forever" (Lil Baby featuring Lil Wayne)	2020	
"No Ceilings" (ASAP Ferg featuring Lil Wayne)	2020	
"Blood Walk" (YG featuring Lil Wayne)	2020	
"Big Tipper" (Tory Lanez featuring Lil Wayne & Melii)	2021	
"Miseducation" (Calboy featuring Lil Wayne)	2021	Shomi Patwary
"Right One" (Dame D.O.L.L.A. featuring Lil Wayne & Mozzy)	2021	
"GangGang" (Polo G featuring Lil Wayne)	2021	
"Batman (Remix)" (LPB Poody featuring Lil Wayne & Moneybagg Yo)	2021	
"Lonely" (DaBaby featuring Lil Wayne)	2021	
"gold fronts" (Foushee featuring Lil Wayne)	2021	Edgar Esteves & Jon Primo
"Sinister" (Cordae featuring Lil Wayne)	2021	Edgar Esteves
"Thought I Was Gonna Stop" (Papoose featuring Busta Rhymes, 2 Chainz, Remy Ma & Lil Wayne)	2022	
"We Set the Trends (Remix)" (Jim Jones featuring DJ Khaled, Migos, Lil Wayne & Juelz Santana)	2022	
"Please Don't Go Go" (Alek Sander featuring Lil Wayne, Sasha Belair, Snoop Dogg)	2022	Alexey Figurov @alexey_figurov
"ay" (MGK featuring Lil Wayne)	2022	Hunter Simmons
"Miss MY Dawgs" (YG featuring Lil Wayne)	2022	
"Main One" (Mario featuring Lil Wayne & Tyga)	2023	
"Ain't Gonna Answer" (NLE Choppa featuring Lil Wayne)	2023	@Hadizaeim_
"The Formula" (Will.i.Am featuring Lil Wayne)	2023	
"Brand New" (Tyga featuring YG & Lil Wayne)	2023	
"Big Dog" (Benny the Butcher featuring Lil Wayne)	2023	
"Wassam Baby" (Rob49 featuring Lil Wayne)	2024	Frankie Watts & ANDREW PERCIVA
"Confirmation (Remix)" (Yung Bleu featuring Lil Wayne)	2024	
"Carnival (Remix)" (NLE Choppa featuring Lil Wayne)	2024	
"Came Out a Beast" (Flau'jae featuring Lil Wayne)	2024	
"High3r" (Mike Will Made-It featuring Lil Yachty & Lil Wayne)	2024	
"Saturday Mornings" (Cordae featuring Lil Wayne)	2024	
"Ridin" (Jessie Reyez featuring Lil Wayne)	2024	RELTA
"Pop It Off (Tyga	2025	Shomi Patwary
"BLEED (Keyawna Nikole	2025	Parke Fox
Tyrant (LUCIFENA	2025	anner James Gordon @tanner_gordon
"Baby Mad at Me (That Mexican OT	2025	
"Love Is Like (Maroon 5	2025	Aerin Moreno
"Tree (Chance the Rapper feat. Smino	2025	Chance the Rapper
"Yoda (Tech N9ne	2025	

== Cameo appearances ==
List of music videos, with directors, showing year released
Title	Year	Director(s)
"Ha" (Juvenile)	1998	—N/a
"Big Ballin'" (Big Tymers)	1998	—N/a
"Get Your Roll On'" (Big Tymers)	1998	—N/a
"Baller Blockin'" (Cash Money Millionaires featuring E-40)	2000	Ronald Williams
"It's in Me" (Turk)	2001	—N/a
"What Happened to That Boy" (Birdman featuring Clipse)	2002	Benny Boom
"Baby You Can Do It" (Birdman featuring Toni Braxton)	2002	David Palmer
"Slow Motion" (Juvenile featuring Soulja Slim)	2004	Life Garland
"We Fly High" (Remix) (Jim Jones featuring T.I., Diddy, Birdman and Young Dro)	2006	Dale Restighini
"Ain't Sayin' Nothin'" (Fat Joe featuring Dre and Plies)	2008	Gil Green
"Coconut Juice" (Tyga featuring Travie McCoy)	2008	Dale Restighini
"Girl I Got You" (Lil Twist and Lil Chuckee)	2009	Kimberly S. Stuckwisch
"Love Hurts" (Nivea)	2010	Point Blank Period
"New Money" (Lil Twist featuring Mishon)	2011	Dayo
"Did It on Em" (Nicki Minaj)	2011	DJ Scoob Doo
"Make It Rain" (Remix) (Rick Ross featuring Wale)	2011	Spiff TV
"My Button" (Shanell)	2012	—N/a
"B Boyz" (Birdman and Mack Maine featuring DJ Khaled, Kendrick Lamar and Ace Hood)	2012	Derick G
"Shout Out" (Birdman featuring French Montana and Gudda Gudda)	2012	Colin Tilley
"Tadow" (P.A.P.I. featuring French Montana, Pusha T and 2 Chainz)	2013	Will Millions
"Mr. Block" (Fyeboy featuring Beanie Sigel)	2013	K Mahone
"5 in the Morning" (Mack Maine featuring Birdman)	2013	Derick G
"Up Until Then" (Mack Maine)	2013	—N/a
"Used 2" (2 Chainz)	2013	Marc Klasfeld

== See also ==
- Lil Wayne albums discography
- Lil Wayne singles discography
- Hot Boys
