= I Get Money (Birdman song) =

Single by Birdman featuring Lil Wayne, Mack Maine & T-Pain
- Released: April 15, 2011
- Recorded: 2011
- Genre: Hip hop
- Length: 4:27
- Label: Cash Money, Universal Motown
- Songwriters: Andrew Harr, Faheem Najm, Jermaine Preyan, Bryan Williams, Dwyane Carter, Jermaine Jackson, Sean Davidson, Andre Davidson
- Producers: The Runners, The Monarch, Infamous

Birdman featuring Lil Wayne, Mack Maine & T-Pain singles chronology
"Fire Flame" (2010)	"I Get Money" (2011)	"Y.U. Mad" (2011)

"I Get Money" is a single by American rapper Birdman. It was originally supposed to be included on a fifth studio album called Bigga Than Life. It features fellow American rappers Lil Wayne and Mack Maine and American singer T-Pain and was produced by the Runners, co-produced by the Monarch and Infamous.

== Music video ==
The video was released in May 2011. It was features cameos from Lil Twist, Ace Hood, Jae Millz, DJ Khaled and Busta Rhymes.

== Track listing ==
1. "I Get Money" – 4:27

== Charts ==
Chart (2011)	Peak position
US Hot R&B/Hip-Hop Songs (Billboard)	63
