= Fast Money =

Fast Money may refer to:

- Fast Money (album), a 2005 album by Birdman
- Fast Money (talk show), a 2006–present American television show
- Fast Money, a 1996 American film featuring Yancy Butler
- Fast Money, the bonus round in the American TV game show Family Feud
- "Fast Money", a song by Big Pun from the album, Capital Punishment, 1998
