= What Happened to That Boy =

Single by Baby featuring Clipse

from the album Birdman
- Released: 2002
- Recorded: 2002
- Genre: Hip-hop
- Length: 4:17
- Label: Cash Money
- Songwriters: Bryan Williams; Gene Thornton; Terrence Thornton; Pharrell Williams; Charles Hugo
- Producer: The Neptunes

Baby singles chronology
"Do That..." (2002)	"What Happened to That Boy" (2002)	"Hell Yeah" (2003)

"What Happened to That Boy" is a song by American rapper Baby, released as the second single from his debut studio album Birdman (2002), featuring hip-hop duo Clipse.

== Critical reception ==
Paul Wong of The Michigan Daily praised Baby's rapping on "What Happened to That Boy", noting that he "runs the show with his slick southern delivery".

== Music video ==
The music video for "What Happened to That Boy" was directed by Benny Boom and filmed in New Orleans. The video had to be recorded twice: following the completion of the original shoot, it transpired that the cinematographer had placed the film reel into the camera backwards, meaning none of the shoot had been captured. Clipse agreed to return to New Orleans for a second shoot, which was this time successful: the video ultimately took a week to produce.

== Role in Clipse vs. Cash Money feud ==
"What Happened to That Boy" is rumored throughout the hip-hop community to have sparked the long-running feud between Clipse and Cash Money Records, although the artists involved have not confirmed this publicly. According to Hot 97 hip-hop DJ Ebro Darden, The Neptunes never received the payment they were promised from Cash Money for producing "What Happened to That Boy"; as a result, Pharrell Williams is alleged to have refused to work with the label in the future, leading Clipse member Pusha T to repeatedly attack Cash Money artists – mainly Lil Wayne at first, then Drake throughout the 2010s – in his music over the following years, out of loyalty to Williams.

== Charts ==
=== Weekly charts ===
Chart (2002–2003)	Peak position
US Billboard Hot 100	45
US Hot R&B/Hip-Hop Songs (Billboard)	14
US Hot Rap Songs (Billboard)	11
US Rhythmic Airplay (Billboard)	38

=== Year-end charts ===
Chart (2003)	Position
US Hot R&B/Hip-Hop Songs (Billboard)	79
