= Do That... =

2002 single by Baby featuring P. Diddy, Mannie Fresh and Tateeze

Single by Baby featuring P. Diddy

from the album Birdman
- Released: 2002
- Genre: Southern hip-hop
- Length: 5:01
- Label: Cash Money; Universal
- Songwriters: Bryan Williams; Varick Smith; Phalon Alexander; Byron Thomas
- Producer: Jazze Pha

Baby singles chronology
"Do That..." (2002)	"What Happened to That Boy" (2002)

P. Diddy singles chronology
"Dance with Us" (2002)	"Do That..." (2002)	"Let's Get Ill" (2003)

Mannie Fresh singles chronology
"Give it Back" (2002)	"Do That..." (2002)	"Get Something" (2003)

Tateeze singles chronology
"Oh Yeah!" (2002)	"Do That..." (2002)	"Conversation" (2005)

Music video
- "Do That..." on YouTube

"Do That..." is the debut single by American rapper Baby and the lead single from his debut studio album Birdman (2002). It features American rappers P. Diddy, Mannie Fresh, and Tateeze. The song was produced by Jazze Pha.

== Critical reception ==
Steve "Flash" Juon of RapReviews criticized Baby and P. Diddy's performances in the song, commenting, "It's obvious neither of these CEO's know the first thing about lyricism, and Puffy even has to borrow from Mystikal in an attempt to set off some heat with his rap. For better or worse though, this Jazze Pha produced track is catchy enough that it will still be a hit on the charts."

== Charts ==
Chart (2002–2003)	Peak position
US Billboard Hot 100	33
US Hot R&B/Hip-Hop Songs (Billboard)	21
US Hot Rap Songs (Billboard)	10
