= Gil Green (director) =

American music video and film director (born 1975)

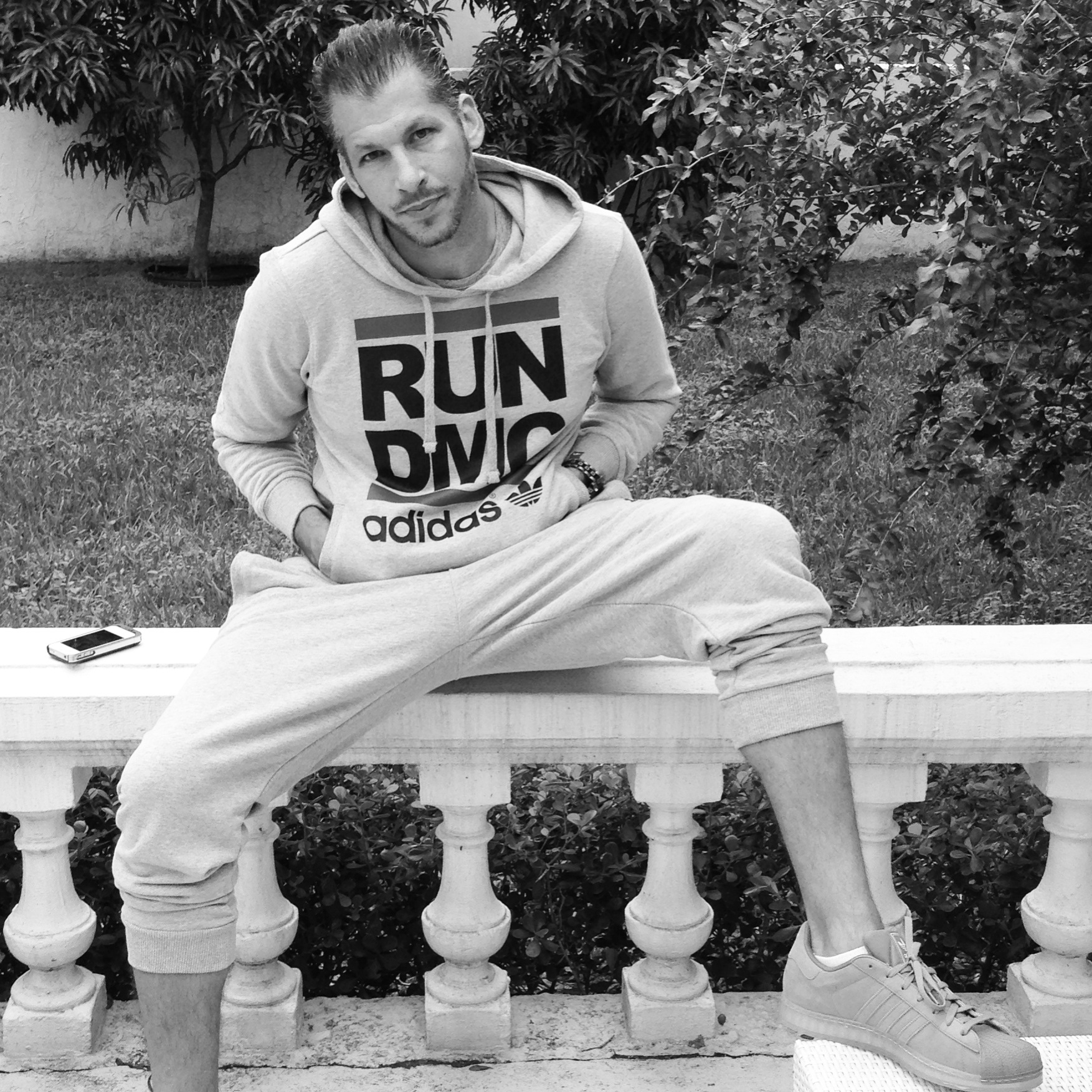
- Green in 2013
- Born: July 29, 1975 (age 51); Miami, Florida, U.S.
- Occupation: Music video director
- Years active: 1996–present
- Website: www.gilgreen.com

Gil Green (born July 29, 1975) is an American music video, commercial, and film director.

== Early life and education ==
Gil attended the Tisch School of the Arts at New York University, at age 19. His thesis music video appeared on music networks, including MTV, BET, and The Box. This launched his career in the music video industry.

== Career ==
Gil has directed more than 150 music videos for multi-platinum artists such as Camila Cabello, John Legend, Alejandro Sanz, Bon Jovi, Pitbull, Chris Brown, Akon, Lil Wayne, Young Jeezy, Ne-Yo, Austin Mahone, Drake, Usher, Flo Rida, P-Diddy, Timbaland, Natasha Bedingfield, Robin Thicke, Nelly, 50 Cent, Romeo Santos, Matisyahu, Brandy, Snoop Dogg, Busta Rhymes, Sean Paul, T-Pain, Ace Hood, Rick Ross, Wyclef, Common, Trey Songz, Lupe Fiasco, The Roots, French rapper Rohff, Oscar award winners, Three 6 Mafia and Indian Rapper, DIVINE.

Gil has won numerous awards including Source Magazine’s “Video of the Year,” and an MTV VMA for “Best Hip Hop Video” for directing Lil Wayne's “ Lollipop.” He has been nominated in three consecutive years for the BET Awards “Director of the Year,” award (2008, 2009, 2010.) In 2006 Gil Green was invited to teach a two-week long Music Video Directing course in Ghana, the project was sponsored by his alma-mater, NYU, MTV Base and Ghana's Ministry of Tourism.

== Music videos ==
| Artist | Year | Song | | | |
|---|---|---|---|---|---|
| 4Mula1 | 2004 | Gotta Roll | | | |
| Ace Hood | 2008 | Cash Flow (feat. T-Pain & Rick Ross) | | | |
| Ace Hood | 2008 | Ride (feat. Trey Songz) | | | |
| Ace Hood | 2009 | Champion (feat. Jazmine Sullivan & Rick Ross) | | | |
| Ace Hood | 2009 | Overtime (feat. Akon & T-Pain) | | | |
| Ace Hood | 2011 | Hustle Hard | | | |
| Ace Hood | 2011 | Hustle Hard (Remix) (feat. Rick Ross & Lil Wayne) | | | |
| Ace Hood | 2012 | I Need Your Love (feat. Trey Songz) | | | |
| Ace Hood | 2013 | Bugatti (feat. Rick Ross & Future) | | | |
| Akon | 2005 | Lonely | | | |
| Akon | 2005 | Pot of Gold | | | |
| Akon | 2007 | Don't Matter | | | |
| Akon | 2008 | I'm So Paid (feat. Young Jeezy & Lil Wayne) | | | |
| Akon | 2009 | Beautiful (feat. Colby O'Donis & Kardinal Offishall) | | | |
| Akon | 2009 | We Don't Care | | | |
| Akon | 2012 | Hurt Somebody (feat. French Montana) | | | |
| Alejandro Sanz & Camila Cabello | 2019 | Mi Persona Favorita | | | |
| Austin Mahone | 2013 | Banga Banga | | | |
| Austin Mahone | 2014 | Mmm Yeah | | | |
| B Rich | 2002 | Whoa Now | | | |
| Backlive | 1996 | 1000 MCs | | | |
| Birdman | 2007 | 100 Million (feat. DJ Khaled, Dre, Rick Ross, Young Jeezy & Lil Wayne) | | | |
| Birdman | 2009 | Money to Blow (feat. Drake & Lil Wayne) | | | |
| Birdman | 2009 | 4 My Town (Play Ball) (feat. Drake & Lil Wayne) | | | |
| Birdman | 2010 | Fire Flame | | | |
| Birdman | 2010 | Fire Flame (Remix) (feat. Lil Wayne) | | | |
| Birdman | 2011 | Y.U. Mad (feat. Nicki Minaj & Lil Wayne) | | | |
| Bon Jovi | 2025 | Red, White and Jersey | | | |
| Brandy & Ray J | 2001 | Another Day In Paradise (Co-directed with Nick Quested) | | | |
| Buju Banton | 2003 | Paid Not Played | | | |
| Buju Banton | 2003 | What Am I Gonna Do (feat. Nadine Sutherland) | | | |
| Camila Cabello | 2019 | "Liar" | Cam'ron | 2004 | Girls |
| Cher Lloyd | 2013 | I Wish (feat. T.I.) | | | |
| Chamillionaire | 2005 | Turn It Up (feat. Lil' Flip) | | | |
| Capone & N.O.R.E. | 2003 | Yes Sir | | | |
| Chapter 4 | 2006 | Fool Wit You | | | |
| Colby O'Donis | 2008 | What You Got (feat. Akon) | | | |
| Dead Prez | 2004 | Hell Yeah | | | |
| Diddy-Dirty Money | 2010 | Loving You No More (feat. Drake) | | | |
| Diddy-Dirty Money | 2011 | I Hate That You Love Me | | | |
| DJ Khaled | 2007 | I'm So Hood (feat. T-Pain, Trick Daddy, Rick Ross & Plies) | | | |
| DJ Khaled | 2007 | We Takin' Over (feat. Akon, T.I., Rick Ross, Fat Joe, Birdman & Lil Wayne) | | | |
| DJ Khaled | 2008 | Out Here Grindin (feat. Akon, Rick Ross, Plies, Lil Boosie, Trick Daddy & Ace Hood) | | | |
| DJ Khaled | 2009 | Fed Up (feat. Usher, Young Jeezy, Rick Ross & Drake) | | | |
| DJ Khaled | 2011 | Welcome to My Hood (feat. Rick Ross, Plies, Lil Wayne & T-Pain) | | | |
| DJ Khaled | 2011 | I'm on One (feat. Drake, Rick Ross & Lil Wayne) | | | |
| DJ Khaled | 2014 | Hold You Down (feat. Chris Brown, Jeremih, Future, August Alsina) | | | |
| DJ Khaled | 2014 | They Don't Love You No More (feat. Rick Ross, French Montana, Meek Mill, Jay Z) | | | |
| DMX | 2006 | Give 'Em What They Want | | | |
| E-Dro | 2005 | Street Life (feat. Shydi) | | | |
| Elephant Man | 2003 | Pon Di River | | | |
| Elephant Man | 2003 | 2004 | | | |
| Elephant Man | Jook Gal (feat. Twista, Kiprich & YoungBloodZ) | | | | |
| 2007 | Five O (feat. Wyclef Jean) | | | | |
| Fat Joe | 2007 | I Won't Tell (feat. J. Holiday) | | | |
| Fat Joe | 2008 | Ain't Sayin' Nothin' (feat. Dre & Plies) | | | |
| Flo Rida | 2008 | Elevator (feat. Timbaland) | | | |
| Frankie J | 2005 | Obsession (No Es Amor) (feat. Baby Bash) | | | |
| Frankie J | 2006 | That Girl (feat. Mannie Fresh & Chamillionaire) | | | |
| Frankie J | 2006 | Daddy's Little Girl | | | |
| Guerilla Black | 2004 | Compton (feat. Beenie Man) | | | |
| Iconz | 2000 | Get Crunked Up | | | |
| Jagged Edge | 2006 | Stunnas (feat. Jermaine Dupri) | | | |
| Jason Derulo | 2017 | Swalla (feat. Nicki Minaj & Ty Dolla Sign) | | | |
| Jason Derulo | 2014 | Stupid Love | | | |
| Jay Sean | 2009 | Do You Remember (feat. Lil Jon & Sean Paul) | | | |
| Jay Sean | 2012 | I'm All Yours (feat. Pitbull) | | | |
| Julia Kova | 2007 | Sorry | | | |
| Julia Kova | 2007 | Beep Beep | | | |
| Kardinal Offishall | 2008 | Dangerous (feat. Akon) | | | |
| Kardinal Offishall | 2008 | Numba 1 (Tide Is High) (feat. Keri Hilson) | | | |
| Kat DeLuna | 2007 | Whine Up (feat. Elephant Man) | | | |
| Knocturnal | 2004 | The Way I Am (feat. Snoop Dogg) | | | |
| Ky-Mani Marley | 2007 | One Time | | | |
| La Chat | 2001 | U Aint Mad Iz Ya | | | |

| Artist | Year | Song |
|---|---|---|
| Lil' Flip | 2005 | What It Do (feat. Mannie Fresh) |
| Lil' Flip | 2004 | Sunshine (feat. Lea) |
| Lil Jon | 2003 | Get Low (Remix) (feat. Busta Rhymes & Elephant Man) |
| Lil Jon | 2002 | I Don't Give a Fuck (feat. Mystikal & Krayzie Bone) |
| Lil Jon | 2004 | What U Gon' Do (feat. Lil Scrappy) |
| Lil Scrappy | 2004 | No Problem |
| Lil Scrappy | 2003 | Head Bussa |
| Lil Wayne | 2008 | Lollipop (feat. Static Major) |
| Lil Wayne | 2008 | Got Money (feat. T-Pain) |
| Lil Wayne | 2008 | Mrs. Officer (feat. Bobby Valentino) |
| Luan Santana | 2017 | Check-In |
| Lupe Fiasco | 2011 | Out of My Head (feat. Trey Songz) |
| Lupe Fiasco | 2012 | Bitch Bad |
| Lyfe Jennings | 2007 | Cops Up |
| Mark Morrison | 2010 | B'Day (feat. Trina) |
| N.O.R.E. | 2004 | Oye Mi Canto (feat. Nina Sky, Daddy Yankee, Big Mato & Gem Star) |
| Natasha Bedingfield | 2007 | Love Like This (feat. Sean Kingston) |
| No Good | 2002 | Ballin Boy |
| Pitbull | 2014 | Time of Our Lives (with Ne-Yo) |
| Pitbull | 2015 | Fun (feat. Chris Brown) |
| Pitbull | 2016 | Greenlight (feat. Flo Rida and Lunchmoney Lewis) |
| Pitbull | 2018 | Quiero Saber (feat. Prince Royce and Ludacris) |
| Pitbull | 2020 | Get Ready (feat. Blake Shelton) |
| Pitbull | 2020 | Tell Me Again (feat. Prince Royce and Ludacris) |
| Pitbull, J Balvin & Camila Cabello | 2017 | Hey Ma |
| Plies | 2007 | Hypnotized (feat. Akon) |
| Prophet Jones | 2001 | Cry Together |
| Project Pat | 2001 | Don’t Save Her |
| R. City | 2015 | "Locked Away" (featuring Adam Levine) |
| Red Café | 2003 | May I |
| Rick Ross | 2006 | Hustlin' |
| Rick Ross | 2007 | Speedin' (feat. R. Kelly) |
| Rick Ross | 2008 | Here I Am (feat. Nelly & Avery Storm) |
| Rick Ross | 2009 | Magnificent (feat. John Legend) |
| Rick Ross | 2009 | All I Really Want (feat. The-Dream) |
| Rick Ross | 2010 | Aston Martin Music (feat. Chrisette Michele & Drake) |
| Rick Ross | 2011 | 9 Piece (feat. T.I. or Lil Wayne) |
| Rohff | 2012 | K-Sos Musik |
| Rohff | 2013 | J'Accélère |
| Romeo Santos | 2011 | All Aboard (feat. Lil Wayne) |
| Sara Paxton | 2005 | Here We Go Again |
| Sean Kingston | 2007 | Take You There |
| Sean Kingston | 2009 | Fire Burning |
| Shontelle | 2009 | Stuck with Each Other (feat. Akon) |
| Sizzla | 2004 | Stageshow |
| Sizzla | 2002 | Thank U Mama |
| Soulja Boy | 2010 | Blowing Me Kisses |
| Soulja Boy | 2010 | Speakers Going Hammer |
| Static | | Rollin |
| Sunshine Anderson | 2001 | Something I Wanna Give U |
| Tamar Braxton | 2013 | The One |
| Tami Chynn | 2008 | Frozen (feat. Akon) |
| Three 6 Mafia | 2001 | 2 Way Freak |
| Three 6 Mafia | 2001 | Baby Mama |
| Three 6 Mafia | 2007 | Doe Boy Fresh (feat. Chamillionaire) |
| Tesher & Jason Derulo | 2021 | Jalebi Baby |
| T.O.K. | 2004 | Gal You Ah Lead |
| Tony Yayo | 2005 | So Seductive (feat. 50 Cent) |
| Tony Yayo | 2005 | I Know You Don't Love Me (feat. Lloyd Banks, Young Buck & 50 Cent) |
| Too Short | 2003 | Shake That Monkey (feat. Lil Jon) |
| Trey Songz | 2014 | Foreign |
| Trey Songz | 2014 | What's Best for You |
| Trey Songz | 2014 | Na Na |
| Trey Songz | 2014 | Smartphones |
| Trick Daddy | 2002 | Amerika |
| Trillville | 2004 | Get Some Crunk in Yo System |
| Trillville | 2004 | Neva Eva |
| Urban Mystic | 2004 | Where Were You |
| Verse Simmonds | 2011 | Boo Thang (feat. Kelly Rowland) |
| Wayne Wonder | 2004 | Hold Me Now |
| Yonnie | 2004 | In Da Club (feat. Ying Yang Twins) |
| Young Buck | 2004 | Shorty Wanna Ride |
| Young Buck | 2007 | U Ain't Goin' Nowhere (feat. LaToya Williams) |
| Young Marqus | 2013 | Send Me a Picture (feat. Jacob Latimore) |
| Young Jeezy | 2008 | Vacation |
| Young Jeezy | 2008 | Put On (feat. Kanye West) |
| Yung Wun | 2004 | Tear It Up (feat. DMX, Lil Flip, David Banner) |
| Zion | 2007 | The Way She Moves (feat. Akon) |

== Commercials ==
| Company | Commercial |
|---|---|
| AND1 | Marcus Camby |
| AND1 | Street Ball Mystique |
| AND1 | Coney Island's Finest |
| Bud Light | Mojito |
| Bud Light | Super Bowl Trip |
| Gatorade | Phenomenal Woman |
| Gatorade | Go Hard |

| Company | Commercial |
|---|---|
| Hasbro | Bop It |
| Hasbro | Monopoly - I Want The Money |
| Miami Heat | I Got The Feeling (2010 Intro) |
| Miami Heat | In The Air Tonight (2011 Intro) |
| Miami Heat | All Of The Lights (2012 Intro) |
| Pepsi | Oh Africa (World Cup 2010) |
| Timberland | Country |
| Timberland | Don't Need That |
| Timberland | Stepping Stone |
| Timberland | Nature Needs Heros |
