= I Made It (Cash Money Heroes) =

Single by Kevin Rudolf featuring Birdman, Jay Sean and Lil Wayne

from the album To the Sky
- Released: February 2, 2010
- Recorded: 2009
- Genre: Rap rock
- Length: 4:50 (original version); 4:11 (album version)
- Label: Cash Money; Universal Republic
- Songwriters: Kevin Rudolf; Bryan Williams; Kamaljit Jhooti; Dwayne Carter; Jacob Kasher Hindlin; Jeremy Skaller; Robert Larow
- Producer: Kevin Rudolf

Kevin Rudolf singles chronology
"Shooting Star (Party Rock Remix)" (2008)	"I Made It (Cash Money Heroes)" (2010)	"You Make the Rain Fall" (2010)

Birdman singles chronology
"4 My Town (Play Ball)" (2009)	"I Made It (Cash Money Heroes)" (2010)	"Loyalty" (2010)

Jay Sean singles chronology
"Do You Remember" (2009)	"I Made It (Cash Money Heroes)" (2010)	"Each Tear" (2010)

Lil Wayne singles chronology
"Steady Mobbin" (2010)	"I Made It (Cash Money Heroes)" (2010)	"I'm Single" (2010)

Music video
- "I Made It (Cash Money Heroes)" on YouTube

"I Made It (Cash Money Heroes)" is the first single from American singer Kevin Rudolf's second studio album, To the Sky (2010). The single features Cash Money artists Birdman, Jay Sean and Lil Wayne. It was released on February 2, 2010.

== Music video ==
The music video debuted on March 18, 2010 on BET although it had been on YouTube since February 25.

== Chart performance ==
On February 11, 2010 it debuted on the United States Billboard Hot 100 at #59 and climbed to peak at #21. It also reached #17 on the Pop Songs. In Canada, it debuted at #71 on the Canadian Hot 100 and has reached #44. On the issue dated April 5, 2010, the song debuted at number four in Australia, marking the second top-five hit for Rudolf on the ARIA Singles Chart.

"I Made It" began climbing the UK Singles Chart in April 2010, reaching #68 on 2 May 2010. The following week, the single climbed to #37, marking Kevin Rudolf's second Top 40 single in the UK.

== Charts ==
Chart (2010)	Peak position
Australia (ARIA)	4
Canada Hot 100 (Billboard)	44
New Zealand (Recorded Music NZ)	4
UK Singles (OCC)	37
UK R&B (OCC)	15
US Billboard Hot 100	21
US Pop Airplay (Billboard)	17

=== Year-end charts ===
Chart (2010)	Position
Australia (ARIA)	65
US Billboard Hot 100	80

== Certifications ==
Region	Certification	Certified units/sales
Australia (ARIA)	Platinum	70,000^{^}
United States (RIAA)	Platinum	1,000,000^{*}
^{*} Sales figures based on certification alone.^{^} Shipments figures based on certification alone.

== Release history ==
Release dates and formats for "I Made It"
Region	Date	Format	Label(s)	Ref.
United States	February 2, 2010	Universal Republic		

== In other media ==
In 2010, "I Made It (Cash Money Heroes)" was used as the official theme song for the WWE pay-per-view WrestleMania XXVI, promos for the 2010 US Open, and the Madden NFL 11 trailer. 2019 World Snooker Champion Judd Trump uses this as his walk-on music in snooker.
