= Written on Her =

2009 single by Birdman

Single by Birdman featuring Jay Sean

from the album Priceless
- Released: June 23, 2009 (Digital)
- Recorded: 2009
- Genre: Pop-rap; dance-pop
- Length: 3:55
- Label: Cash Money, Universal Motown
- Songwriters: Bryan Williams; Kamaljit Jhooti; Justin Harris; Nicholas Lazzeri; Evan Roberts; Morgan Page; Jeremy Skaller; Elisabeth Maurus; Jermaine Shute; Thara Prashad
- Producer: Oddz N Endz

Birdman singles chronology
"Sun Come Up" (2009)	"Written on Her" (2009)	"Money to Blow" (2009)

Jay Sean singles chronology
"Down" (2009)	"Written on Her" (2009)	"Do You Remember" (2009)

"Written on Her" is a song by American rapper Birdman featuring British singer Jay Sean, released on June 23, 2009 as the second single from the former's third album, Priceless (2009). Production was handled by the trio Oddz N Endz, and samples the Deadmau5 remix of "The Longest Road" by Morgan Page. It was only an iTunes Store bonus track for Priceless, although the remix featuring Flo Rida and Mack Maine is included on all deluxe versions of the album.

"Written on Her" was Birdman's first single released in the United Kingdom, where it became available as a digital download on December 7, 2009. The song peaked at number 19 on the Bubbling Under Hot 100 and failed to enter any UK-based chart.

== Background ==
The song was first played during an interview on Westwood Radio 1 with Birdman and Jay Sean.

== Music video ==
The music video was premiered on YouTube on August 14, 2009. The video was produced alongside the video for "Down." The video was filmed in Buckinghamshire in a mansion, an enormous private mansion and park where English DJ Mark Ronson hosted his 33rd birthday; it was also the filming location for the film The Golden Compass. English models Bianca Simmone and Maysoon Shaladi make an appearance. On September 22, 2009, was the video added to MTV, MTV2 & BET.

== Remix ==
The remix features original collaborator Jay Sean and new verses by Flo Rida and Mack Maine. It was included in the deluxe edition of the album. However, the iTunes version of the remix does not feature Flo Rida.

== Charts ==
Chart (2009)	Peak position
US Bubbling Under Hot 100 (Billboard)	19
US Hot Rap Songs (Billboard)	17
US Rhythmic Airplay (Billboard)	16

== Release history ==
Release dates and formats for "Written on Her"
Region	Date	Format	Label(s)	Ref.
United States	September 29, 2009	Mainstream airplay	Universal Motown	
