= Birdman (album) =

Studio album by Baby
- Released: November 26, 2002
- Genre: Hip-hop
- Length: 77:26
- Labels: Cash Money; Universal
- Producers: Mannie Fresh; The Neptunes; Jermaine Dupri; Swizz Beatz; Jazze Pha; Timbaland; Bryan-Michael Cox

Baby chronology
I Need a Bag of Dope (1993)	Birdman (2002)	Fast Money (2005)

Singles from Baby
- 1. "Do That..." Released: 2002; 2. "What Happened to That Boy" Released: 2002; 3. "Baby You Can Do It" Released: 2003

Professional ratings
Review scores
Source	Rating
Blender	3/5 stars
RapReviews	(5.5/10)

Birdman is the debut studio album by American rapper Baby, who later adopted its title as his stage name. It was released on November 26, 2002, by Cash Money Records and Universal Records. The album was supported by the singles "Do That..." (featuring P. Diddy, Mannie Fresh and Tateeze), "What Happened to That Boy" (featuring Clipse) and "Baby You Can Do It" (featuring Toni Braxton). The album featured guest appearances from Cash Money artists Lil Wayne, Boo & Gotti, Strings, Mannie Fresh, and TQ, as well as T.I., P. Diddy, Jermaine Dupri, Jazze Pha, Cam'ron, Toni Braxton, Clipse, and Petey Pablo, among others.

The album peaked at number 24 on the Billboard 200, selling 108,000 units in its first week and receiving mixed reviews. On January 15, 2003, the Recording Industry Association of America (RIAA) certified it Gold for shipments of 500,000 copies in the United States.

== Track listing ==
Credits adapted from Tidal and liner notes.

No.	Title	Writer(s)	Producer(s)	Length
1.	"Bird Lady Talkin' (Intro)"	Bryan Williams; Byron Thomas	Mannie Fresh	0:54
2.	"Looks Like a Job 4..."	B. Williams; Leslie Brathwaite	Leslie Brathwaite; Bryan Williams; Ronald Williams	4:26
3.	"Fly in Any Weather" (featuring Jazze Pha)	B. Williams; B. Thomas; Phalon Alexander	Mannie Fresh	3:15
4.	"Ms. Bird Pageant (Part 1)"	B. Williams; B. Thomas	Mannie Fresh	0:40
5.	"Ms. Bird" (performed by Big Tymers)	B. Williams; B. Thomas	Mannie Fresh	3:39
6.	"I Got To" (featuring Lil Wayne)	B. Williams; B. Thomas; Dwayne Carter, Jr.	Mannie Fresh	4:14
7.	"Never Had Nothin'"	Darryl McDaniels; Joseph Simmons; Larry Smith; B. Williams; B. Thomas; L. Brathwaite	Mannie Fresh; Leslie Brathwaite^{[a]}	4:15
8.	"Baby You Can Do It" (featuring Toni Braxton)	Harold Clayton; Sigidi Abdullah; B. Williams; Timothy Mosley	Timbaland	4:19
9.	"Ms. Bird Live from Superdome"	B. Williams; B. Thomas	Mannie Fresh	1:08
10.	"What Happened to That Boy" (featuring Clipse)	B. Williams; Pharrell Williams; Chad Hugo; Terrence Thornton; Gene Thornton	The Neptunes	4:17
11.	"On the Rocks" (featuring The D Boys and Jazze Pha)	B. Williams; P. Alexander; Alvin Nelson; Kendrick Moore	Jazze Pha	4:50
12.	"How It Be" (featuring Jermaine Dupri and TQ)	B. Williams; Jermaine Dupri; Bryan-Michael Cox; Terrance Quaites	Jermaine Dupri; Bryan-Michael Cox^{[a]}	3:09
13.	"Heads Up" (featuring The D Boys)	B. Williams; P. Alexander; A. Nelson; K. Moore	Jazze Pha	4:42
14.	"Hustlas, Pimps and Thugs" (featuring 8Ball, Jazze Pha, and TQ)	B. Williams; B. Thomas; Premro Smith; P. Alexander; T. Quaites	Mannie Fresh	4:56
15.	"Fly Away" (featuring TQ)	B. Williams; B. Thomas; T. Quaites	Mannie Fresh	4:03
16.	"Say It Ain't So" (featuring Boo & Gotti, Keith Murray, and Mikkey)	B. Williams; B. Thomas; Sabrian Sledge; Mwata Mitchell; Mikkel Nance; Keith Murray	Mannie Fresh	3:33
17.	"Ms. Bird Pageant (Part 3)"	B. Williams; B. Thomas	Mannie Fresh	1:41
18.	"Do That..." (featuring P. Diddy, Mannie Fresh, and Tateeze)	B. Williams; Varick Smith; P. Alexander; B. Thomas	Jazze Pha	5:01
19.	"Ice Cold" (featuring TQ and Jazze Pha)	B. Williams; P. Alexander; T. Quaites	Jazze Pha	4:26
20.	"Ms. Bird Pageant (Part 4)"	B. Williams; B. Thomas	Mannie Fresh	0:42
21.	"Ghetto Life" (featuring Lil Wayne, TQ, and Cam'ron)	B. Williams; Kasseem Dean; D. Carter, Jr.; Cameron Giles	Swizz Beatz	4:28
22.	"Keeps Spinnin" (featuring T.I., Petey Pablo, Lil Wayne, TQ, Mannie Fresh, Stone, Wolf, Bizzy, Gilly, and Mikkey)	B. Williams; B. Thomas; Clifford Harris, Jr.; Moses Barrett III; T. Quaites; Andre Nelson; T. Williams; Bizzy Biz; Far'D Nasir; M. Nance	Mannie Fresh	4:48
Total length:				77:26

Notes

- ^{^[a]} signifies a co-producer

Sample credits

- "Never Had Nothin'" contains replayed elements from "Rock Box", written by Darryl McDaniels, Joseph Simmons, and Larry Smith.
- "Baby You Can Do It" contains replayed elements from "Take Your Time (Do It Right)", written by Harold Clayton and Sigidi Abdullah.

== Charts ==
=== Weekly charts ===
Chart (2002)	Peak position
US Billboard 200	24
US Top R&B/Hip-Hop Albums (Billboard)	4

=== Year-end charts ===
Chart (2003)	Position
US Billboard 200	133
US Top R&B/Hip-Hop Albums (Billboard)	35

== Certifications ==
Region	Certification	Certified units/sales
United States (RIAA)	Gold	500,000^{^}
^{^} Shipments figures based on certification alone.
