= Born Stunna =

Single by Birdman featuring Rick Ross
- Released: May 22, 2012
- Recorded: 2012
- Genre: Hip hop
- Length: 5:11
- Label: Cash Money; Universal Republic
- Songwriters: Bryan Williams; William Roberts II; Shamann Cooke
- Producer: Beat Billionaire

Birdman singles chronology
"IMA BO$ (remix)" (2011)	"Born Stunna" (2012)	"Tapout" (2013)

Rick Ross singles chronology
"Lemme See" (2012)	"Born Stunna" (2012)	"Touch'N You" (2012)

Alternative cover

Music video
- "Born Stunna" on YouTube

"Born Stunna" is a hip hop song by American rapper Birdman. The song features Rick Ross and was produced by Beat Billionaire. The music video was released on June 11, 2012, on Vevo. and was directed by Derick G. The remix, featuring Lil Wayne and Nicki Minaj, was released July 10, 2012.

== Track listing ==
Digital single

No.	Title	Writer(s)	Producer(s)	Length
1.	"Born Stunna" (featuring Rick Ross)	Bryan Williams, William Roberts II, Shamann Cooke	Beat Billionaire	5:11

== Chart performance ==
Chart (2012)	Peak position
US Hot R&B/Hip-Hop Songs (Billboard)	45
US Hot Rap Songs (Billboard)	24

== Release history ==
Regions	Dates	Format	Label(s)
United States	May 22, 2012	digital download	Cash Money Records
