= Loyalty (Birdman song) =

Single by Birdman featuring Lil Wayne and Tyga
- B-side: "Pop That"
- Released: June 26, 2010 (digital download); July 20, 2010 (radio play)
- Recorded: 2009
- Genre: Hip hop; R&B
- Length: 4:03
- Label: Cash Money; Universal Motown
- Songwriters: Dwayne Carter; Daniel Johnson; William Roger Patterson; Micheal Nguyen-Stevendon; Bryan Williams
- Producer: Kane Beatz

Birdman singles chronology
"I Made It (Cash Money Heroes)" (2010)	"Loyalty" (2010)	"Fire Flame" (2010)

Lil Wayne singles chronology
"I'm Single" (2010)	"Loyalty" (2010)	"No Love" (2010)

Tyga singles chronology
"Deuces" (2010)	"Loyalty" (2010)	"Far Away" (2011)

"Loyalty" is a song by American rapper Birdman, released by Universal Republic Records Cash Money Records on June 26, 2010 as a non-album single. It features guest appearances from Cash Money signees Lil Wayne and Tyga, and production from Kane Beatz. Its accompanying music video was directed by David Rousseau.

== Background ==
"Loyalty" was recorded for Birdman's fourth album Priceless (2010), but it did not appear on the tracklist and is considered a "leftover".

== Music video ==
The official music video for "Loyalty" was released to MTV on June 16, 2010. The video was shot before Lil Wayne went to jail on a gun charge. The video was shot in front of a green screen and includes cameos from Drake, Mack Maine, Lil Chuckee, and Short Dawg all wearing diapers. The video features backdrops of Tyga's hometown Compton, Birdman's and Lil Wayne's hometown of New Orleans and their adopted town Miami.

== Remix ==
A remix was released by Birdman featuring Cash Money artists Tyga, Brisco, Mack Maine, Bow Wow, Lil Twist, and Cory Gunz.

== Track listing ==
iTunes single digital download

1. "Loyalty" (featuring Lil Wayne & Tyga) - 3:57

iTunes Loyalty EP digital download

1. "Loyalty" (Birdman featuring Lil Wayne & Tyga) - 3:57
2. "Pop That" (Lil Wayne featuring Birdman) - 3:16
3. "Loyalty" (Music Video)

== Charts ==
Chart (2010)	Peak position
US Bubbling Under Hot 100 (Billboard)	7
US Hot R&B/Hip-Hop Songs (Billboard)	61
US Hot Rap Songs (Billboard)	25
