= Fast Money (album) =

Studio album by Birdman
- Released: June 21, 2005
- Studio: Cash Money Studios (New Orleans, LA); M&M Studios (Spring Hill, FL); Hit Factory Criteria (Miami, FL)
- Genre: Southern hip-hop; gangsta rap
- Length: 1:12:59
- Label: Cash Money; Universal
- Producer: Batman; Birdman; Deezle; Mannie Fresh; O.G.; T-Mix

Birdman chronology
Birdman (2002)	Fast Money (2005)	Like Father, Like Son (2006)

Singles from Fast Money
- 1. "Shyne On" Released: December 14, 2004; 2. "Neck of the Woods" Released: April 19, 2005; 3. "We Got That" Released: 2005

Professional ratings
Review scores
Source	Rating
AllMusic	4/5 stars
Blender	3/5 stars
HipHopDX	3.5/5
Now	2/5 Ns
RapReviews	6.5/10

Fast Money is the second album by American rapper Birdman. It was released on June 21, 2005, by Cash Money Records and Universal Records. Recording sessions took place at Cash Money Studios in New Orleans, M&M Studios in Spring Hill and Hit Factory Criteria in Miami. Produced by Deezle, Batman, O.G., Mannie Fresh, T-Mix, and Birdman himself, it features guest appearances from Lil Wayne, 6 Shot, Tateeze, Bun B, Curren$y, Lil' Carl, Lil' Mo, Mack Maine, Magnolia Chop, as well as his Big Tymers partner Mannie Fresh.

Preceded by three singles, "Shyne On", "Neck of the Woods" and "We Got That", the album debuted at number 9 on the Billboard 200, number 4 on the Top R&B/Hip-Hop Albums and number 2 on the Top Rap Albums charts with first-week sales of 65,000 copies in the United States. The first two singles off of the album reached the US Billboard Hot R&B/Hip-Hop Songs chart, peaking at No. 65 and 71, respectively.

== Track listing ==
No.	Title	Writer(s)	Producer(s)	Length
1.	"Intro"	Bryan Williams; Darius J. Harrison	Deezle	2:11
2.	"My Territory"	Williams; Batman	Birdman; Batman	4:22
3.	"Neck of the Woods" (featuring Lil Wayne)	Williams; Dwayne Carter; Batman	Batman	4:15
4.	"Ghetto Life" (featuring Bun B and 6 Shot)	Williams; Bernard Freeman; Jermaine Tucker; Tristan G. Jones; O.G.	T-Mix; O.G.	4:21
5.	"Hug da Block"	Williams; Byron Thomas	Mannie Fresh	4:55
6.	"Cash Money Niggaz" (featuring Lil' Carl)	Williams; Lil' Carl; Batman; O.G.	Birdman; Batman; O.G.	4:43
7.	"Shovlin' Snow" (featuring Currensy, Main and Lil' Wayne)	Williams; Shante Franklin; Jermaine Anthony Preyan; Carter; Harrison	Deezle	4:30
8.	"Pressure's On"	Williams; Batman; O.G.	Birdman; Batman; O.G.	4:20
9.	"Get It All Together" (featuring Lil' Wayne)	Williams; Carter; Harrison	Deezle	5:04
10.	"We Got That" (featuring 6 Shot)	Williams; Tucker; Harrison	Deezle	4:17
11.	"Smoke Out" (featuring Ta and 6 Shot)	Williams; Marinna Teal; Tucker; Batman; O.G.	Batman; O.G.	4:39
12.	"Big Pimpin'"	Williams; O.G.	Birdman; O.G.	4:44
13.	"Out the Ghetto" (featuring Magnolia Chop)	Williams; Russell Veals; Harrison	Deezle	2:28
14.	"Around the World"	Williams; Harrison; Rick James	Deezle	4:43
15.	"Solid Chic" (featuring Lil' Mo)	Williams; Cynthia Loving; Thomas	Mannie Fresh	5:12
16.	"We Getting It On" (performed by Big Tymers featuring Ta)	Williams; Teal; Thomas	Mannie Fresh	3:34
17.	"Get Your Shine On" (featuring Lil' Wayne)	Williams; Carter; Thomas	Mannie Fresh	4:41
Total length:				1:12:59

Sample credits

- Track 14 contains samples from the composition "Ghetto Life" written and performed by Rick James.

== Personnel ==
- Bryan "Baby/Birdman" Williams – vocals, producer (tracks: 2, 6, 8, 12), executive producer
- Dwayne "Lil' Wayne" Carter – vocals (tracks: 3, 7, 9, 17)
- Bernard "Bun B" Freeman – vocals (track 4)
- Jermaine "Six Shot" Tucker – vocals (tracks: 4, 10, 11)
- Lil' Carl – vocals (track 6)
- Shante "Curren$y" Franklin – vocals (track 7)
- Jermaine "Mack Maine" Preyan – vocals (track 7)
- Marinna "Tateeze" Teal – vocals (tracks: 11, 16)
- Russell "Magnolia Chop" Veals – vocals (track 13)
- Cynthia "Lil' Mo" Loving – vocals (track 15)
- Byron "Mannie Fresh" Thomas – vocals (track 16), producer (tracks: 5, 15–17)
- Dennis Moorehead – additional keyboards (track 15)
- Darius "Deezle" Harrison – producer (tracks: 1, 7, 9, 10, 13, 14), recording (tracks: 1, 2, 6, 10)
- Batman – producer (tracks: 2, 3, 6, 8, 11)
- Tristan "T-Mix" Jones – producer (track 4)
- O.G. – producer (tracks: 4, 6, 8, 11, 12)
- Fabian Marasciullo – recording, mixing
- Stephanie Gonzalez – recording (track 4), engineering assistant (tracks: 1, 4, 6, 8, 10, 11, 13–16)
- Javier Valverde – recording (track 15)
- Tommy Mara – engineering assistant (track 2)
- James Wisner – engineering assistant (track 17)
- Brian "Big Bass" Gardner – mastering
- Ronald "Slim" Williams – executive producer
- Russel Neblett – A&R coordinator

== Charts ==
Chart (2005)	Peak position
US Billboard 200	9
US Top R&B/Hip-Hop Albums (Billboard)	4
US Top Rap Albums (Billboard)	2
