= Priceless (Birdman album) =

Pricele$$

Studio album by Birdman
- Released: November 23, 2009
- Recorded: 2006–09
- Genre: Hip-hop
- Length: 52:17
- Labels: Cash Money; Universal Motown
- Producers: Birdman; Slim; Lil Wayne (exec.); I.N.F.O.; Timbaland; Oddz N Endz; Drumma Boy; T-Minus; T-Pain; DJ Infamous; Boi-1da; Kevin Rudolf

Birdman chronology
5 * Stunna (2007)	Pricele$$ (2009)	Just Another Gangsta (2019)

Singles from Pricele$$
- 1. "Always Strapped" Released: March 17, 2009; 2. "Written on Her" Released: June 23, 2009; 3. "Southside" Released: August 18, 2009; 4. "Money to Blow" Released: September 8, 2009; 5. "4 My Town (Play Ball)" Released: November 23, 2009

Professional ratings
Review scores
Source	Rating
AllMusic	3.5/5 stars
HipHopDX	2.5/5 stars
Rolling Stone	2/5 stars
The Smoking Section	3/5 stars

Priceless (stylized as Pricele$$) is the fourth studio album by American rapper Birdman. The album was released on November 23, 2009, by Cash Money Records and Universal Motown Records. Producers included I.N.F.O., Oddz N Endz, Timbaland, Drumma Boy, T-Minus, and Infamous.

== Singles ==
The first, and second most successful single off the album was "Always Strapped" featuring Lil Wayne. The remix was used for the video, and album featuring Mack Maine. The second single was "Written on Her" featuring Jay Sean, which in December 2009 significantly also became Birdman's first release in the UK. The third, and most successful single of Birdman's career as a lead artist peaking at number twenty-six on the Billboard Hot 100 was "Money to Blow", featuring Drake, and Lil Wayne. The fourth single from the album was "4 My Town (Play Ball)", also featuring Drake, and Lil Wayne.

== Chart performance ==
The album debuted on the Billboard 200 chart at number thirty-three, selling 34,000 copies in its first week. It's his lowest charting album to date. The album has currently sold over 380,000 copies as of March 4, 2010.

== Critical reception ==
William E. Ketchum III of HipHopDX.com said that Birdman constructs a disc full of capable singles, but not because of his own skills on the mic, but his producers and his guest stars. Calling the album "an album that's much more tolerable than Birdman detractors would expect or like to admit." He talked down to Birdman's rapping saying that "unlike other materialistic rhymers, Birdman doesn't have any redeeming qualities; he doesn't have the charisma of Lil Wayne, he doesn't have the dry wit and wordplay of Fabolous, and he lacks the larger-than-life persona of Rick Ross. He furthly states that the uninventive rhymes and the unvarying subject matter take their toll. In conclusion, he stated that Birdman may not know how to rap well, but "by leading a team of capable emcees and beatmakers around him, he knows how to make music. And in this industry, that sixth sense of knowing what goes where is, well, priceless."

== Track listing ==
No.	Title	Writer(s)	Producer(s)	Length
1.	"Intro"	Bryan Williams; Tyler Williams	T-Minus	1:48
2.	"Been About Money"	Williams, J; Christopher	I.N.F.O.	4:12
3.	"Money to Blow" (featuring Drake & Lil Wayne)	Williams; Aubrey Graham; Dwayne Carter; Christopher Gholson	Drumma Boy	4:19
4.	"Money Machine"	Williams; Howard Metoyer	X-Fyle	3:21
5.	"Pricele$$" (featuring Lil Wayne)	Williams; Carter; Timothy Mosley	Timbaland	5:33
6.	"Bring It Back" (featuring Lil Wayne)	Williams; Carter; Marco Rodriguez-Diaz	Infamous	4:22
7.	"Nightclub"	Williams; Metoyer	X-Fyle	4:36
8.	"4 My Town (Play Ball)" (featuring Drake & Lil Wayne)	Williams; Graham; Carter; Matthew Samuels	Boi-1da	4:21
9.	"Hustle" (featuring Lil Wayne & Gudda Gudda)	Williams; Robert Cobbs	Andrew "Drew" Correa	4:23
10.	"Shinin'" (featuring T-Pain)	Williams; Faheem Najm	T-Pain	3:31
11.	"Mo Milly" (featuring Drake & Bun B)	Williams; Graham; Bernard Freeman	Boi-1da	4:12
12.	"I Want It All" (featuring Kevin Rudolf & Lil Wayne)	Williams; Kevin Rudolf; J. Kasher; Carter	Kevin Rudolf	3:16
13.	"Always Strapped" (Remix) (featuring Lil Wayne & Mack Maine)	Williams; Carter; Cobbs; Jermaine Preyan	Mr. Beatz	4:34

Deluxe edition bonus tracks
No.	Title	Producer(s)	Length
14.	"MP (a.k.a. Money and Power)"	The Olympicks	4:29
15.	"Ball Till Ya Fall" (featuring Gucci Mane)	Boi-1da	3:37
16.	"Grindin' Making Money" (featuring Lil' Kim & Nicki Minaj)	Mr. Beatz	3:47
17.	"Written on Her" (Remix) (featuring Jay Sean, Flo Rida & Mack Maine)	Oddz N Endz	4:10
18.	"Southside" (Remix) (featuring Lil Wayne, Mack Maine & Rick Ross)	Infamous	3:46

== Charts ==
=== Weekly charts ===
Chart (2009–10)	Peak position
US Billboard 200	33
US Top R&B/Hip-Hop Albums (Billboard)	6
US Top Rap Albums (Billboard)	3

=== Year-end charts ===
Chart (2010)	Position
US Top R&B/Hip-Hop Albums	43
US Top Rap Albums	19
