= Always Strapped =

Single by Birdman featuring Lil Wayne

from the album Priceless
- Released: March 17, 2009 (digital)
- Recorded: 2006, 2009 (Remix)
- Genre: Southern hip hop
- Length: 3:28 (single version w/o Mack Maine); 4:34 (album version); 5:49 (remix version)
- Label: Cash Money; Universal Motown
- Songwriters: Dwayne Carter; Bryan Williams; Jermaine Preyan; R. Cobbs II
- Producer: Mr. Beatz

Birdman singles chronology
"Foolish (Remix)" (2008)	"Always Strapped" (2009)	"Sun Come Up" (2009)

Lil Wayne singles chronology
"Successful" (2009)	"Always Strapped" (2009)	"Respect My Conglomerate" (2009)

"Always Strapped" is the first single from rapper Birdman's fourth studio album, Priceless. It was released officially on iTunes on March 17, 2009. The song features Lil Wayne and Mack Maine, and was produced by Mr. Beatz. The song peaked at number 54 on the Billboard Hot 100 and received gold certification by the Recording Industry Association of America.

== Background ==
In 2006, a version of this song leaked online with Lil Wayne and Juelz Santana. It is believed this version was intended for their shelved collaborative album, "I Can't Feel My Face". Then, in November 2006, another version leaked online on a bootleg mixtape by DJ Joey Fingaz, believed to be a leftover from Like Father, Like Son. Lil Wayne used the same first verse as the previous version, although re-recorded and Juelz Santana was replaced with Birdman. The final version released 3 years later, in 2009, featured the same vocals from the leaked version with Birdman and Lil Wayne, but with a new instrumental. Mack Maine was later added to the song also.

== Music video ==
There are two videos for the song, first the original version of the song and the remix version of the song.

The first video was premiered on MTV Jams, Sucker Free Sunday, and MTV.com on June 14, 2009, and was the video for the original version of the song. Birdman and Lil Wayne raps their verses from the original version of the song. However, Mack Maine is featured in the video and raps his own new verse. This version ranked at #18 on BET's Notarized: Top 100 Videos of 2009 countdown.

The second video was the remix premiered on BET's 106 & Park on June 15, 2009. The remix video featured Young Jeezy and Rick Ross, who also filmed his part on the video. DJ Khaled, Lil' Twist, Rick Ross, 2 Pistols, Yo Gotti, All Star Cashville Prince, and Kevin Rudolf make appearances in the video. Birdman, Lil' Wayne, Young Jeezy and Rick Ross rap their verses from the remix version of the song.

== Remixes and versions ==
- Original "I Can't Feel My Face" Version: Lil Wayne (featuring Juelz Santana)
- Original "Like Father, Like Son" Version: Lil Wayne & Birdman
- Album and video Version (credited as "Always Strapped (Remix)": Birdman (featuring Lil Wayne & Mack Maine)
- Single version: Birdman (featuring Lil Wayne)
- Official remix version: Birdman (featuring DJ Khaled, Lil Wayne, Young Jeezy & Rick Ross)

== Charts ==
=== Weekly charts ===
Chart (2009)	Peak position
US Billboard Hot 100	54
US Hot R&B/Hip-Hop Songs (Billboard)	10
US Hot Rap Songs (Billboard)	5
US Rhythmic Airplay (Billboard)	29

=== Year-end charts ===
Chart (2009)	Position
US Hot R&B/Hip-Hop Songs (Billboard)	51

== Certifications ==
Region	Certification	Certified units/sales
United States (RIAA)	Gold	500,000^{^}
^{^} Shipments figures based on certification alone.
