= Money to Blow =

Single by Birdman featuring Drake and Lil Wayne

from the album Priceless
- Released: September 16, 2009
- Recorded: 2008
- Genre: Southern hip-hop
- Length: 4:22 (digital)
- Label: Cash Money; Universal Motown
- Songwriters: Aubrey Graham; Dwayne Carter; Bryan Williams
- Producer: Drumma Boy

Birdman singles chronology
| "Written on Her" (2009) | "Money to Blow" (2009) | "4 My Town (Play Ball)" (2009) |

Lil Wayne singles chronology
| "Forever" (2009) | "Money to Blow" (2009) | "I Can Transform Ya" (2009) |

Drake singles chronology
| "Forever" (2009) | "Money to Blow" (2009) | "I Invented Sex" (2009) |

"Money to Blow" is the third single from rapper Birdman's fourth studio album, Priceless. It was released on September 16, 2009 and features guest appearances from then-Cash Money Records artists Drake and Lil Wayne. The song was first leaked in early 2008 and originally belonged to the former, who gave it to Birdman as a lead artist. Lyrically, "Money to Blow" is an ode to each performer's success in the music industry. It was produced by Tennessee-based producer Drumma Boy.

A sequel to the song, "4 My Town (Play Ball)" was released the following November as the fourth and final single from the album, which has an identical lineup and contains similar subject matter.

== Music video ==
The music video was directed by Gil Green and released on September 25, 2009. It includes cameo appearances by Jay Sean, Currensy, Busta Rhymes, Brisco, Rocko, Young Money artists Lil Chuckee, Lil Twist, Gudda Gudda, Jae Millz, T-Streets and Dre.

== CD track listing ==
1. Money to Blow (Clean) (4:21)
2. Money to Blow (Street) (4:22)
3. Money to Blow (Instrumental) (4:21)
4. Money to Blow (Clean Acapella) (4:20)
5. Money to Blow (Street Acapella) (4:22)

== Versions ==
- Money to Blow by Drake feat. Twista & Lil Wayne
- Money to Blow by Drake feat. Rocko & Lil Wayne
- Money To Blow by Drake feat. Lil Scrappy & Lil Wayne

== Charts ==
=== Weekly charts ===
| Chart (2009) | Peak position |
|---|---|
| US Billboard Hot 100 | 26 |
| US Hot R&B/Hip-Hop Songs (Billboard) | 2 |

| Chart (2010) | Peak position |
|---|---|
| US Hot Rap Songs (Billboard) | 2 |

=== Year-end charts ===
| Chart (2010) | Peak position |
|---|---|
| US Hot R&B/Hip-Hop Songs (Billboard) | 34 |
| US Rap Songs (Billboard) | 12 |
