= Y.U. Mad =

Single by Birdman featuring Nicki Minaj and Lil Wayne
- Released: September 13, 2011
- Recorded: 2011
- Genre: Hip hop
- Length: 3:07
- Label: Cash Money; Universal Motown
- Songwriters: Bryan Williams; Dwayne Carter; Jeremy Coleman; Todd Tolkoff; Onika Tanya Maraj
- Producers: JMIKE; Mad Max

Birdman singles chronology
| "Fire Flame" (2011) | "Y.U. Mad" (2011) | "I'm a Boss (Remix)" (2011) |

Nicki Minaj singles chronology
| "Fly" (2011) | "Y.U. Mad" (2011) | "Fireball" (2011) |

Lil Wayne singles chronology
| "It's Good" (2011) | "Y.U. Mad" (2011) | "Mirror" (2011) |

Music video
- "Y.U. Mad" on YouTube

"Y.U. Mad" is a hip hop song by American rapper Birdman. The song features Cash Money/Young Money recording artists Nicki Minaj and Lil Wayne. The song was sent to U.S. Urban radio on September 20, 2011. and U.S. Rhythmic radio on October 11, 2011.

== Music video ==
On October 15, 2011, it was revealed the music video had been filmed in Miami and was directed by Gil Green. The video premiered on Sucker Free on November 27, and on 106 & Park on November 28. The video shows Minaj dressed as Lil Wayne and dubs herself 'the Female Weezy', as she raps at the beginning of the song and at the end of her single "Stupid Hoe", from her sophomore album Pink Friday: Roman Reloaded. During Birdman's verse, he is seen sitting at a table, with YMCMB – an abbreviation of "Young Money Cash Money Billionaires", referring to the artists of Lil Wayne's Young Money Entertainment label – decorating the walls behind him. The video features cameos from Mack Maine, DJ Khaled and Cortez Bryant.

== Charts ==
| Chart (2011) | Peak position |
|---|---|
| US Billboard Hot 100 | 68 |
| US Hot R&B/Hip-Hop Songs (Billboard) | 46 |
| US Hot Rap Songs (Billboard) | 25 |

== Release history ==
| Country | Date | Format | Label | Ref |
|---|---|---|---|---|
| United States | September 13, 2011 | Digital download | Cash Money Records | |
| United States | October 11, 2011 | Radio airplay | Cash Money Records | |
