= 4 My Town (Play Ball) =

Single by Birdman featuring Drake and Lil Wayne

from the album Priceless
- Released: December 7, 2009
- Recorded: 2009
- Genre: Hip-hop
- Length: 4:21
- Label: Cash Money; Universal Motown
- Songwriters: Bryan Williams; Aubrey Graham; Dwayne Carter; Matthew Samuels
- Producer: Boi-1da

Birdman singles chronology
"Money to Blow" (2009)	"4 My Town (Play Ball)" (2009)	"I Made It (Cash Money Heroes)" (2010)

Drake singles chronology
"BedRock" (2009)	"4 My Town (Play Ball)" (2009)	"Over" (2010)

Lil Wayne singles chronology
"On Fire" (2009)	"4 My Town (Play Ball)" (2009)	"Revolver" (2009)

"4 My Town (Play Ball)" is the fourth single from rapper Birdman's fourth studio album, Priceless. The song features Young Money/Cash Money artists Drake and Lil Wayne. Drake's verse and the unmastered instrumental to the song was originally leaked and titled "Play Ball" by Richie Wess and featured Drake and Yung Dred, and then later placed on Soulja Boy's mixtape Paranormal Activity again as "Play Ball" featuring Drake.

Another version with another verse by Birdman, but no verse by Lil Wayne, leaked before the official version had been released. A freestyle was made by Young Jeezy. "4 My Town" is considered to be the sequel to "Money to Blow", the previous single from Birdman's album.

== Track listing ==
- Digital download
1. "4 My Town (Play Ball)" – 4:21

== Music video ==
A music video, directed by Gil Green, was released for the song.

== Charts positions ==
=== Weekly charts ===
Chart (2009)	Peak position
US Billboard Hot 100	90

Chart (2010)	Peak position
US Hot R&B/Hip-Hop Songs (Billboard)	37
US Hot Rap Songs (Billboard)	17
