= Fire Flame =

2010 single by Birdman featuring Lil Wayne

"Fire Flame (Remix)"

Single by Birdman featuring Lil Wayne

from the album Bigga Than Life
- Released: November 22, 2010 (digital download)
- Recorded: 2010
- Studio: The Hit Factory (Miami, Florida)
- Genre: Hip hop
- Length: 5:00 (Explicit) 4:55 (Edited); 5:31 (Explicit) 4:47 (Clean)
- Label: Cash Money, Universal Motown
- Songwriters: Bryan Williams, Dwayne Carter, Rondell Cobbs II
- Producers: Mr. Beatz, Kill Will

Birdman singles chronology
"Loyalty" (2010)	"Fire Flame (Remix)" (2010)	"Y.U. Mad" (2011)

Lil Wayne singles chronology
"No Love" (2010)	"Fire Flame" (2010)	"6 Foot 7 Foot" (2010)

"Fire Flame" is a song by American rapper Birdman. The song features a guest appearance from fellow rapper Lil Wayne, who was not originally intended to appear on the song: however, his vocals were added following his release from prison. The rappers wrote the song, along with record producers Mr. Beatz and Kill Will, who also handled the song's production.

"Fire Flame" achieved success on various music charts, peaking at number sixty-four on the US Billboard Hot 100 and also charting well on various component charts. The song's music video, directed by Gil Green, premiered on January 16, 2011. It is produced by Mr. Beatz and Kill Will. The song is featured along with Wayne's 2011 single "John", featuring Rick Ross, on the Tap Tap Revenge 4 game.

== Background and development ==
"Fire Flame" was written by Birdman, Lil Wayne, Mr Beatz and Kill Will, with the latter also handling the song's production. The song originally leaked onto the internet as a Birdman solo song, with no vocals from Wayne: Wayne's vocals were later recorded at The Hit Factory, a recording studio in Miami, during his first recording session since being released from Rikers Island following a nine-month prison sentence for illegal possession of a weapon.

On November 15, American rapper and producer DJ Khaled leaked the new version of "Fire Flame" onto the internet through his blog, called "We the Best TV". Khaled claimed that the song would appear on a sequel to Birdman and Wayne's 2006 collaborative album Like Father, Like Son: however, other reports have confirmed that the song will appear on Birdman's upcoming fifth studio album, titled Bigga Than Life. The song was released for digital paid download in the United States on November 22, 2010.

== Composition ==
"Fire Flame" is a "synth-heavy" rap song featuring a guest appearance from fellow American rapper Lil Wayne. Wayne performs the first and last verses of the song, and Birdman's vocals are placed in between.

== Chart performance ==
The song peaked on Billboard Hot R&B/Hip-Hop Songs at #28. It debuted at number 84 on the Billboard Hot 100 and reached number 64 in its fourth week. "Fire Flame" is Birdman's first song to chart on the Canadian Hot 100, peaking at #71.

== Music video ==
The music video for "Fire Flame" premiered on January 16, 2011, and is directed by Gil Green. The video is set in a warehouse, and whilst Birdman and Wayne perform their sections of the song, flames continuously shoot out from behind them, as part of the literal meaning of the song.

== Remixes ==
The official remix features a verse by Cash Money rapper Yo Gotti. Joell Ortiz also remixed the song. Chamillionaire released a freestyle to the track titled "Rubber Bands".

== Track listing ==
- Digital single
1. "Fire Flame" (featuring Lil Wayne) – 4:20

== Charts ==
=== Weekly charts ===
Chart (2010–2011)	Peak position
Canada Hot 100 (Billboard)	71
US Billboard Hot 100	64
US Hot R&B/Hip-Hop Songs (Billboard)	28
US Hot Rap Songs (Billboard)	14
US Rhythmic Airplay (Billboard)	40

=== Year-end charts ===
Chart (2011)	Position
US Hot R&B/Hip-Hop Songs (Billboard)	97

== Release history ==
Country	Date	Format	Label
United States	November 22, 2010	Digital download	Cash Money, Universal Motown
United States	January 11, 2011	Urban contemporary radio	Cash Money, Universal Motown
United States	January 25, 2011	Urban airplay	Cash Money, Universal Motown
