= Birdman (rapper) =

American rapper and record executive (born 1969)

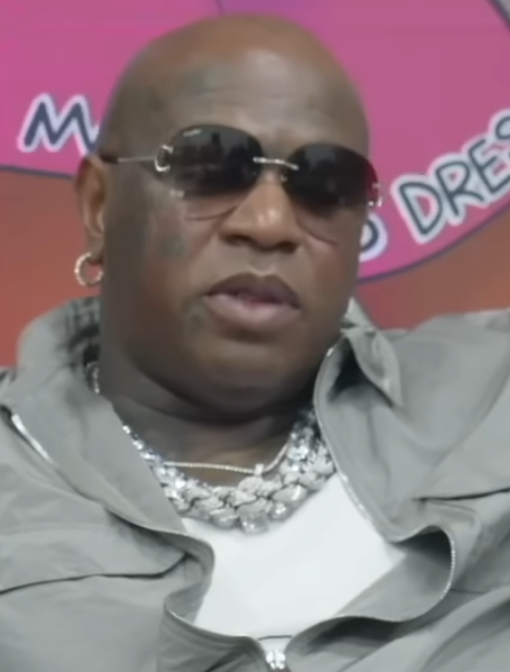
- Birdman in September 2023
- Born: Bryan Christopher Brooks; February 15, 1969 (age 57); New Orleans, Louisiana, U.S.
- Other names: Baby; B-32; Stunna; Beatrice; Atrice
- Occupations: Rapper; songwriter; record executive
- Years active: 1989–present
- Spouse: Toni Braxton (m. 2024)
- Children: 2
- Relatives: Ronald "Slim" Williams (brother); BenJarvus Green-Ellis (nephew)
- Awards: Full list
- Musical career
- Genres: Southern hip-hop; gangsta rap; bounce; trap
- Works: Birdman discography
- Labels: Cash Money; Universal; Universal Motown; Republic
- Member of: Rich Gang; Big Tymers
- Formerly of: Cash Money Millionaires
- Website: birdmanstunna.com

Bryan Christopher Williams (né Brooks; February 15, 1969), better known by his stage names Birdman and Baby, is an American rapper and record executive. He is the public face of Cash Money Records, a record label he co-founded with his older brother, Ronald "Slim" Williams, in 1991. His self-titled debut studio album (2002) (Note: At the time of its release, he was known as Baby, although he changed his stage name to the album's title, Birdman shortly after.) was released by the label in a joint venture with Republic Records; it received mixed critical and moderate commercial reception, along with his three subsequent albums: Fast Money (2005), 5 * Stunna (2007), and Priceless (2009). Outside of his solo career, he is one half of the hip-hop duo Big Tymers with producer Mannie Fresh, and a member of the label's short-lived supergroup Cash Money Millionaires.

Apart from his solo work and five releases as part of Big Tymers, Birdman is best known for his discovery and mentorship of fellow New Orleans rapper Lil Wayne, with whom he released the collaborative album, Like Father, Like Son (2006). As label-head of Cash Money Records, he has been central to the career and commercial success of Wayne, as well as future signees including Drake, Nicki Minaj, and Tyga. Many acts were signed in a joint venture with Wayne's Young Money Entertainment (branded as "YMCMB"), (Note: Acronym for "Young Money Cash Money Billionaires".) a label that operated as an imprint of Cash Money from its formation in 2005 until 2018. Birdman also founded the spin-off project Rich Gang in 2014, a loose-knit collective assembled from core signees of both labels; it was joined and soon led by then-upcoming Southern rappers Young Thug and Rich Homie Quan, as well as other artists not directly signed to the labels.

One of the wealthiest hip-hop artists, he placed fifth on the Forbes list of wealthiest music industry figures in 2015, and fourth in 2017, with a net worth of $155 million and $110 million, respectively. Outside of music, Birdman has ventured into various industries, including fashion, spirits, and oil exploration.

== Early life ==
Birdman was born Bryan Christopher Brooks on February 15, 1969, at Charity Hospital in New Orleans, Louisiana, to Johnnie Williams and Gladys Brooks. Williams did not sign the birth certificate, which led to Bryan initially taking his mother's surname. For almost a month after his birth, he did not have a given first name and was referred to as "Baby", a nickname he retains to this day. As a small child, Brooks and his family lived on top of a bar owned by his father. His mother, Gladys, died when he was five years old. After their mother's death, Birdman and his siblings Kim, Ronald and Ray were taken in by their uncle and spent two years living in Prince George, British Columbia, Canada, followed by two years in foster care upon their return to New Orleans. After Johnnie learned that they were in the foster home, a long legal battle took place in the mid-'70s which eventually ended with Johnnie and his wife Patricia gaining full custody of the children and Bryan's name changing to Bryan Williams. He and his siblings moved in with Johnnie and Patricia and lived in the Magnolia Projects in Central City in the 3rd ward of Uptown New Orleans, where Bryan developed a close friendship with his step-brother, Eldrick Wise. While living in the Magnolia, Williams and Wise soon began committing robberies and sold heroin together before both getting arrested at the age of 16. At 18, both were again arrested for drug possession and sentenced to three years in Elayn Hunt Correctional Center. Williams served 18 months before he was acquitted of all charges.

== Career ==
=== 1988–1998: Cash Money Records ===
After Bryan was released from prison, he and Slim both began paying attention to the emerging bounce sub-genre of hip-hop, a sound that was quickly becoming popular in nightclubs all over New Orleans. In 1992, Bryan came up with the idea to form their own record label, and wanted to name it "Cash Money Records". Bryan and Slim would then travel to nightclubs all over Louisiana to see who was playing and try to recruit artists to the fledgling label. Their first signed artist was a local rapper named Kilo G, who released the label's first ever project, a horrorcore album titled "The Sleepwalker" in 1992. Bryan and Slim continued to recruit more and more artists, and Bryan was able to convince his friend and local DJ Mannie Fresh to become Cash Money's in-house producer. By the mid-1990s, Cash Money had grown to a popular independent label in the south, with most of their fanbase located in New Orleans and the surrounding areas. In 1995, Cash Money artist Lil' Slim was introduced to 12-year-old Dwayne Carter at a local block party, and after hearing him rap, brought him to Baby's attention, and soon after Carter was signed to Cash Money as the youngest artist on the label. Carter was placed into a group with another young rapper, 14-year-old Christopher Dorsey, and the two would be known as "Baby D" and "Lil Doogie" respectively; The B.G.'z. During this time, Baby himself also began to rap as a member of the group 32 Golds, going by the name B-32. Despite their regional popularity, the label suffered many setbacks in the mid-1990s, with a number of the "first generation" of Cash Money artists leaving the label citing financial issues as the main reason. In addition to this, Kilo G, Pimp Daddy and Yella Boy were all murdered in the mid-90s. The only two artists to remain were Baby D and Lil Doogie, who renamed themselves B.G. and Lil Wayne respectively in 1997. The same year, Baby and Slim recruited two new artists, Juvenile and Turk, and the four were placed together in a new group, known as the Hot Boys. The Hot Boys soon took Cash Money to new heights, and the label was able to sign a $30 million deal with Universal Records in 1998.

=== 1998–2003: Big Tymers ===
After Cash Money's nationwide success, Baby and Mannie Fresh formed their own group, dubbing themselves the Big Tymers. Big Tymers debuted in 1998 with the album How Ya Luv That? and went on to release I Got That Work in 2000 and Hood Rich in 2002. I Got That Work contained the popular singles "Get Your Roll On" and "#1 Stunna". Although the singles failed to chart on the Billboard Hot 100, I Got That Work was certified platinum by the Recording Industry Association of America (RIAA) for selling over one million copies in the United States. Hood Rich contained the hit single "Still Fly", which was nominated for a Grammy award and peaked at No. 11 on the Hot 100. Hood Rich was also certified platinum in the US. Big Money Heavyweight followed in 2003, and was again successful, being certified Gold in the US. The group went on hiatus soon after and remained inactive following Mannie Fresh's departure from Cash Money Records, though they've since reunited for live performances, most recently in 2017.

=== 2002–2005: Solo career ===
After the departure of Juvenile and B.G. from Cash Money, Baby was forced to focus on his solo career and began marketing himself as the new public face of Cash Money Records. He released his major label debut, Birdman on November 26, 2002, and by January 15, 2003, the album was certified gold by the Recording Industry Association of America (RIAA), for the shipments of 500,000 copies in the United States. The album peaked at No. 24 on the Billboard 200, and featured guest appearances from Jazze Pha, Mannie Fresh, Lil' Wayne, Toni Braxton, Clipse, Jermaine Dupri, Cam'ron, T.I., Keith Murray and Puff Daddy among others. Due to the album's success, Baby became more widely known to the public as "Birdman", and soon after changed his stage name to reflect this.

After Lil Wayne achieved worldwide success with his critically acclaimed and commercially successful album Tha Carter in 2004, on which Birdman was featured numerous times, Wayne became the flagship artist of Cash Money, with Birdman and Lil Wayne being viewed as the two public faces of the label. Birdman's second album, Fast Money, was released in 2005 and was once again a success, debuting at number 9 on the Billboard 200, with first-week sales of 65,000 copies in the United States.

=== 2006–2010: Like Father, Like Son & solo albums ===
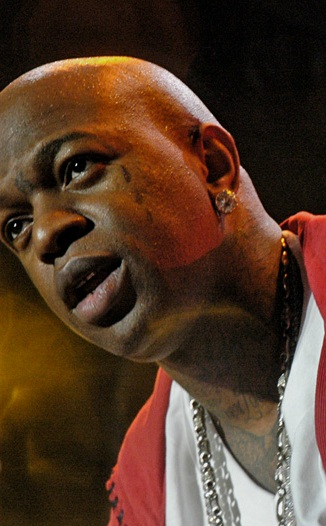
Birdman in 2007

Lil Wayne and Birdman released their first collaborative album, Like Father, Like Son, on October 31, 2006. It peaked at number 3 on the Billboard 200, was certified gold and spawned two singles, "Stuntin' Like My Daddy" and "Leather So Soft". The former peaked at number twenty-one on the Billboard Hot 100 in the United States, won the 2007 BET Viewer's Choice Award, and was named the 94th best song of 2006 by Rolling Stone magazine. Birdman's third solo studio album, 5 * Stunna, was released on December 11, 2007, and debuted at number 18 on the US Billboard 200, selling 80,000 copies in the first week. It spawned the hit single "Pop Bottles" which features Lil Wayne and peaked at number 38 on the Hot 100. To date, the album has sold 372,000 copies in the United States.

Birdman released his fourth studio album Priceless on November 23, 2009. The album debuted on the Billboard 200 chart at number thirty-three, selling 34,000 copies in its first week. The album's first single, was "Always Strapped", featuring Lil Wayne, and the second was "Written on Her", featuring British singer Jay Sean. "Southside", featuring Lil Wayne, was the third single. "Money to Blow" featuring Drake and Lil Wayne was the fourth single. "4 My Town (Play Ball)" featuring Drake and Lil Wayne was the fifth single. "Written on Her" also became Birdman's first UK release in December 2009.

=== 2010–present: Rich Gang ===
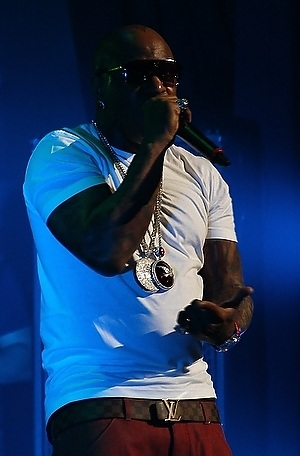
Birdman performing at Club Nokia, 2010

In 2010, Birdman announced plans to release an album titled Priceless 2, a sequel to his previous album, but changed the title to Bigga Than Life. The first promotional single was titled "Loyalty" and featured Lil Wayne and Tyga. Other collaborations will come from Rick Ross, Young Jeezy, Bun B and Drake. The album was scheduled to be released in early 2011. He released a music video for a possible future single, "My Jewel", which featured Bun B and Young Jeezy. On November 22, 2010, he released the first official single, "Fire Flame", which featured Lil Wayne. Birdman released another single called "I Get Money" featuring T-Pain, Young Money artist Mack Maine and Lil Wayne. On September 13, 2011, Birdman released "Y.U. MAD", featuring Nicki Minaj and Lil Wayne. He collaborated with Mack Maine as a duo named White Boys to release a mixtape titled Billionaire Minds on November 2, 2011. On May 22, 2012, he released "Born Stunna", featuring Rick Ross. The remix, featuring Lil Wayne and Nicki Minaj, was released July 10, 2012. The most recent single, "Shout Out" featuring Gudda Gudda and French Montana, was released October 16, 2012.

During 2008, it was announced Birdman was set to release a mixtape with his long-time friend Rick Ross titled The H. On May 16, 2013, Birdman and Rick Ross announced that The H would be released as a mixtape hosted by DJ Khaled on May 23, 2013. The project was recorded during a couple days in 2008. A new compilation album, titled Rich Gang: Flashy Lifestyle, hosted by Birdman, was previously set to be released June 25, 2013. The album would feature appearances from the many members of Cash Money Records and Young Money Entertainment among others such as Meek Mill, French Montana and Future. A mixtape titled Rich Gang: Allstars was released prior to the release of that album. This mixtape included singles from artists of Rich Gang, such as "Started From the Bottom" by Drake, "Bugatti" by Ace Hood featuring Rick Ross and Future, "Karate Chop" (Remix) by Future, "Love Me" by Lil Wayne featuring Drake and Future, "Freaks" by French Montana featuring Nicki Minaj, "Rich As Fuck" by Lil Wayne featuring 2 Chainz, and "Champions" by Kevin Rudolf featuring Fred Durst of Limp Bizkit, Birdman, and Lil Wayne.

In 2014, Birdman began promoting Atlanta-based rappers Young Thug and Rich Homie Quan. The two had already collaborated extensively with each other. Birdman released a single titled "Lifestyle" featuring Young Thug and Rich Homie Quan from a Rich Gang album. He also released a second Rich Gang mixtape titled Rich Gang: Tha Tour Pt. 1 featuring new music from Young Thug and Rich Homie Quan. The mix-tape featured no music from Young Money or Cash Money artists except Birdman himself, and instead had guest features from artists such as PeeWee Longway, Nipsey Hu$$le, Jacquees and Yung Ralph. Birdman, Young Thug, and Rich Homie Quan had a joint tour planned.

Forbes magazine estimated his personal fortune at US$125 million in 2012. In 2013 he was listed by Forbes.com as the fifth highest-earning star in hip-hop, taking in $21 million in the year to September 2013.

Birdman and Lil Wayne had supposedly reconciled from their beef in 2016 after being seen at Drake's NYE Party, at Miami's Club Liv, and in studio. However, a contract dispute still exists between them, with the latter trying to get out of the contract; in 2016, Birdman called off the negotiations to settle their lawsuit.

Birdman announced the release date of his mixtape with his protege Jacquees on April 26, 2016. This went on to be released on May 27, 2016.

In 2021, Birdman collaborated with YoungBoy Never Broke Again for a mixtape, From the Bayou. However, in 2024, YoungBoy appeared to be taking shots at Birdman, when DJ Akademiks debuted YB's new song "Tears of War".

== Personal life ==
=== Family and relationships ===
Birdman's mother, Gladys Brooks (August 29, 1935 – January 21, 1975), whom he exclusively refers to as Ms. Gladys, died when he was five years old. Birdman has made numerous references to her in his music, including releasing a song named after her. His father, Johnnie Williams (September 20, 1920 – July 13, 1996), owned a number of small businesses in the New Orleans area, including multiple bars and a laundrette. Johnnie was killed in a car accident in 1996.

Birdman has ten brothers and twelve sisters, including Ronald "Slim" Williams. Ronald is the co-founder of Cash Money Records, alongside Birdman. One of Birdman's younger sisters, Tamara, was killed in a car accident in 2006. Due to their mother dying at a young age, Birdman primarily raised his younger sister and referred to her as his daughter. Birdman also had a close relationship with his step-brother Eldrick Wise, who was killed in an unsolved murder in 1991.

Birdman has two children from a relationship during the late 1990s with a woman named Tia: Bryan Jr. (born 1997) and Bria (born 1998). In addition to his biological children, he formed a close parental-like bond with protégée Lil Wayne, whom he has often referred to as his "other son".

Birdman began dating singer Toni Braxton in May 2016, and the couple announced their engagement in February 2018. In January 2019, the couple called off the engagement. However, in April 2019, both Braxton and Birdman confirmed that they were still together. In April 2025, TMZ reported that Birdman and Braxton were married, having secretly tied the knot on August 8, 2024. Two weeks after their wedding, Braxton filed for divorce, but in January 2025, the couple decided to stay together and continue their marriage.

=== Legal issues ===
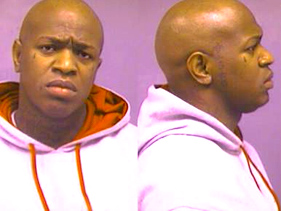
Mugshot, November 2007

In November 2007, Birdman was arrested in Kingsport, Tennessee and charged with possession of nearly a pound of marijuana.

In October 2009, Birdman, Lil Wayne, Cash Money Records and various music distribution outlets were sued for copyright infringement by Thomas Marasciullo, who claims his voice was used without permission. Both rappers asked him to record some "Italian-styled spoken word recordings" in 2006. The lyrics were allegedly used on "Respect" and other tracks from the rappers' collaboration album Like Father, Like Son and Birdman's 5 * Stunna.

=== Feud with Lil Wayne ===
On December 4, 2014, just five days before Tha Carter V was scheduled to be released, Wayne issued a statement saying the album would not be released due to his displeasure with Birdman refusing to release the album, although it had been completed. Wayne also expressed his feelings by stating he felt he and his creative partner were being held "prisoner". Lil Wayne filed a lawsuit. On January 20, 2015, Wayne self-released Sorry 4 the Wait 2, a sequel to his 2011 mixtape, to compensate for the continued delay of Tha Carter V. Upon the release of Sorry 4 the Wait 2, it was noted that Wayne dissed Birdman and Cash Money Records several times throughout. Birdman was reportedly upset with this. In late January 2015, Lil Wayne filed a $51 million lawsuit against Birdman and Cash Money over the delay of Tha Carter V.

In January 2015, Wayne also stated that when he left Cash Money, he would take Drake and Nicki Minaj with him. On June 22, TMZ reported new details on the lawsuit. According to documents filed by Lil Wayne, Birdman and Cash Money had mismanaged Young Money, including Drake and Minaj. The documents alleged that Birdman and Cash Money hadn't paid people. "Free C5" became the mantra to get money to the unpaid artist. In June 2015, Wayne joined Jay-Z's Tidal as an artist owner and exclusively released a single on the service titled "Glory". On July 4, 2015, Wayne released Free Weezy Album exclusively through Tidal under Young Money and Republic Records. Prosecutors alleged on July 15 that Birdman and Young Thug conspired to murder Lil Wayne and were involved in an April 26 shooting. On July 16, Birdman filed a $50-million lawsuit against Jay Z's Tidal streaming service over Lil Wayne's Free Weezy Album, alleging that Cash Money Records exclusively owned the rights to Lil Wayne's music. Due to frustration with the situation, Lil Wayne tweeted in 2016 that he planned to retire because he felt "mentally defeated". Many rappers rushed to his defense and pleaded with him not to retire, including Kendrick Lamar, one of the delayed album's featured performers.

== Other ventures ==
=== Oil business ===
In early 2010, Birdman formed an oil and gas exploration company, Bronald Oil and Gas, LLC. The company was a joint venture founded by Birdman and his brother Slim, and the name was a combination of the brothers' first names, Bryan and Ronald. Evidence of the company's actual business operations was scant, limited mostly to a website and the appearance of a "pumpjack" tattoo on the side of Birdman's bald head. The website indicated that the company's strategy would be to first develop existing land holdings and seek out new oil and gas leases. In February 2010, Birdman told Ozone magazine that he had been in the oil business for "4 or 5 years" and was "making very good money off that".

However, by March 2010, Birdman had almost completely covered the pumpjack tattoo, which sparked speculation that the Bronald Oil project had stalled. An investigative report from Bloomberg revealed that official regulators in charge of oil and gas permits had never even heard of Bronald.

=== Clothing lines ===
In 2006, Birdman and Lil Wayne launched the fashion brand/Cash Money off-brand YMCMB (Young Money Cash Money Billionaires), which became a popular streetwear label.

On April 22, 2016, Birdman disparaged the hosts of hip-hop radio show The Breakfast Club during a live interview, telling them to "stop playing with my fucking name". He later issued an apology for his outburst after being awarded the "Donkey of the Day" appellation from one of the hosts, Charlamagne Tha God. The video went viral, and on April 27, 2016, Birdman launched a merchandise line, "Respek", featuring catchphrases from the interview.

=== Spirit company ===
He has invested in a spirit company called "GTV Vodka".

== Discography ==
Studio albums

- Birdman (2002)
- Fast Money (2005)
- 5 * Stunna (2007)
- Priceless (2009)

Collaborative albums

- How You Luv That (with Big Tymers) (1997)
- How You Luv That Vol. 2 (with Big Tymers) (1998)
- I Got That Work (with Big Tymers) (2000)
- Baller Blockin' (with Cash Money Millionaires) (2000)
- Hood Rich (with Big Tymers) (2002)
- Big Money Heavyweight (with Big Tymers) (2003)
- Like Father, Like Son (with Lil Wayne) (2006)
- Rich Gang (with Rich Gang) (2013)
- Just Another Gangsta (with Juvenile) (2019)

== Awards and nominations ==
| Award | Year | Recipient(s) and nominee(s) | Category | Result | Ref. |
|---|---|---|---|---|---|
| BET Hip Hop Awards | 2022 | Birdman & Youngboy Never Broke Again | Best Duo/Group | Nominated | |
