= I Am Music (Lil Wayne album) =

Greatest hits album by Lil Wayne
- Released: March 31, 2023
- Recorded: 2003–2023
- Genre: Hip-hop
- Length: 78:25
- Labels: Young Money; Republic
- Producers: Avenue Beatz; Bangladesh; Brian Soko; Chase N. Cashe; Deezle; Detail; Dre Moon; Drew Correa; DVLP; Filthy; Hit-Boy; Infamous; Jim Jonsin; Kane Beatz; Mannie Fresh; Onhel; Rasool Diaz; REO; Swizz Beatz; T-Minus; Tha Drummahz; The Smeezingtons

Lil Wayne chronology
Trust Fund Babies (2021)	I Am Music (2023)	Tha Fix Before Tha VI (2023)

Singles from I Am Music
- 1. "Kant Nobody" Released: February 23, 2023

Professional ratings
Review scores
Source	Rating
AllMusic	4.5/5 stars

I Am Music is the first greatest hits album by American rapper Lil Wayne. It was released by Young Money Entertainment and Republic Records on March 31, 2023.

The album includes songs from studio albums—Tha Carter (2004), Tha Carter II (2005), Tha Carter III (2008), Rebirth (2010), I Am Not a Human Being (2010), Tha Carter IV (2011), I Am Not a Human Being II (2013), and Tha Carter V (2018), as well as a song from Young Money Entertainment compilation album We Are Young Money (2009).

== Track listing ==
I Am Music track listing
No.	Title	Writer(s)	Producer(s)	Length
1.	"Kant Nobody" (featuring DMX; 2023)	Dwayne Carter, Jr.; Earl Simmons; Kasseem Dean; Avery Chambliss; Marvin Gaye; Joshua Berkman; Byran Montesano; Jermaine Preyan	Swizz Beatz; Avenue Beatz	3:00
2.	"Lollipop" (featuring Static Major; from Tha Carter III, 2008)	Carter; Harrison; Stephen Garrett; James Scheffer	Jim Jonsin; Deezle	4:59
3.	"A Milli" (from Tha Carter III, 2008)	Carter; C. Hester; Shondrae Crawford; Quentin Cook	Bangladesh	3:41
4.	"BedRock" (Young Money featuring Lloyd; from We Are Young Money, 2009)	Carter; Lilly; Graham; Maraj; Mills; Stevenson; Lloyd Polite, Jr.; Johnson	Kane Beatz	4:48
5.	"6 Foot 7 Foot" (featuring Cory Gunz; from Tha Carter IV, 2011)	Carter, Jr.; Seandrae Crawford; Peter Panky, Jr.; William Attaway; Irving Burgie	Mr. Bangladesh	4:08
6.	"How to Love" (from Tha Carter IV, 2011)	Carter, Jr.; Preyan; Noel Fisher; LaMar Seymour; LaNelle Seymour; Marcus Boyd	Detail; Tha Drummahz	4:00
7.	"Right Above It" (featuring Drake; from I Am Not a Human Being, 2010)	Carter, Jr.; Aubrey Graham; Johnson; Andrew Canton	Kane Beatz	4:31
8.	"Drop the World" (featuring Eminem; from Rebirth, 2010)	Carter, Jr.; Marshall Mathers; Jesse Woodard; Mike Strange; Chauncey Hollis	Hit-Boy; Chase N. Cashe	3:49
9.	"She Will" (featuring Drake; from Tha Carter IV, 2011)	Carter, Jr.; Graham; Tyler Williams	T-Minus	5:05
10.	"Mirror" (featuring Bruno Mars; from Tha Carter IV, 2011)	Carter, Jr.; Peter Hernandez; Phillip Lawrence; Ramon Owen	REO; The Smeezingtons	3:48
11.	"Mrs. Officer" (featuring Bobby V and Kidd Kidd; from Tha Carter III, 2008)	Carter; Darius Harrison; Bobby Wilson	Deezle	4:46
12.	"Blunt Blowin" (from Tha Carter IV, 2011)	Carter, Jr.; Bigram Zayas; Matthew DelGiorno	DVLP; Filthy	5:12
13.	"Mona Lisa" (featuring Kendrick Lamar; from Tha Carter V, 2018)	D. Carter; Kendrick Duckworth; Marco Rodriguez; Angel Aponte	Infamous; Onhel	5:24
14.	"Uproar" (featuring Swizz Beatz; from Tha Carter V, 2018)	D. Carter; Kasseem Dean; Avery Chambliss; Edward Holland; Lamont Herbert Dozier; Brian Holland	Swizz Beatz; Avenue	3:14
15.	"No Worries" (featuring Detail; from I Am Not a Human Being II, 2013)	Carter Jr.; Rasool Diaz; Jermain Preyan; Bryan Williams; Andre Proctor; Brian Soko; Brian Smith	Detail; Dre Moon; Soko; Diaz	3:40
16.	"Fireman" (from Tha Carter II, 2005)	Carter, Jr.; Bigram Zayas; Matthew "Filthy" DelGiorno	DVLP; Filthy	4:23
17.	"Go D.J." (from Tha Carter, 2004)	D. Carter; B. Thomas	Mannie Fresh	4:41
18.	"Mr. Carter" (featuring Jay-Z; from Tha Carter III, 2008)	Carter; Andrews Correa; Sha Ron Prescott; Shawn Carter; Marco Rodriguez	Infamous; Drew Correa	5:16
Total length:				78:25

== Charts ==
=== Weekly charts ===
Weekly chart performance for I Am Music
Chart (2023–2025)	Peak position
Canadian Albums (Billboard)	64
US Billboard 200	25
US Top R&B/Hip-Hop Albums (Billboard)	9

=== Year-end charts ===
2023 year-end chart performance for I Am Music
Chart (2023)	Position
US Billboard 200	192
US Top R&B/Hip-Hop Albums (Billboard)	63

2024 year-end chart performance for I Am Music
Chart (2024)	Position
US Billboard 200	136
US Top R&B/Hip-Hop Albums (Billboard)	65

2025 year-end chart performance for I Am Music
Chart (2025)	Position
US Top R&B/Hip-Hop Albums (Billboard)	61

== Certifications ==
Region	Certification	Certified units/sales
United Kingdom (BPI)	Gold	100,000^{‡}
^{‡} Sales+streaming figures based on certification alone.
