= Kane Beatz production discography =

The following is a discography of production by Kane Beatz.

== Singles produced ==
List of singles, with selected chart positions and certifications, showing year released and album name
| Title | Year | Peak chart positions | | | | | Certifications | Album |
| Title | Year | US | US R&B | US Rap | AUS | UK | Certifications | Album |
|---|---|---|---|---|---|---|---|---|
| "Tuck Ya Ice" (Trick Daddy feat. Birdman) | 2006 | — | 90 | — | — | — | | Back by Thug Demand |
| "BedRock" (Young Money feat. Lloyd) | 2009 | 2 | 2 | 1 | — | 9 | RIAA: 3× Platinum | We Are Young Money |
| "Reverse Cowgirl" (T-Pain) | 2010 | 75 | 64 | — | 79 | — | | Non-album single |
| "Loyalty" (Birdman feat. Lil Wayne and Tyga) | 2010 | 107 | 61 | 25 | — | — | | Bigga Than Life |
| "Bottoms Up" (Trey Songz feat. Nicki Minaj) | 2010 | 6 | 2 | — | 74 | 71 | RIAA: 3× Platinum | Passion, Pain & Pleasure |
| "Right Above It" (Lil Wayne feat. Drake) | 2010 | 6 | 4 | 1 | 98 | 37 | RIAA: Platinum | I Am Not a Human Being |
| "The Show Goes On" (Lupe Fiasco) | 2010 | 9 | 45 | 4 | 5 | 49 | ARIA: 2× Platinum; RIAA: 3× Platinum | Lasers |
| "Super Bass" (Nicki Minaj) | 2011 | 3 | 6 | 3 | 6 | 10 | ARIA: 6× Platinum; RIAA: 8× Platinum | Pink Friday |
| "Good Good Night" (Roscoe Dash) | 2011 | 91 | 44 | 21 | — | — | | J.U.I.C.E. |
| "We in This Bitch" (DJ Drama feat. Future, Young Jeezy, T.I. and Ludacris) | 2012 | — | 68 | — | — | — | | Quality Street Music |
| "Bed of Lies" (Nicki Minaj feat. Skylar Grey) | 2014 | — | — | — | — | — | | The Pinkprint |
"—" denotes a recording that did not chart or was not released in that territory.

== 2006 ==
=== Trick Daddy - Back by Thug Demand ===
- 07. "Tuck Ya Ice" (feat. Birdman)
- 11. "Lights Off" (feat. International Jones)

=== Twill ===
- 00. "What It Be Like"

=== Lil' Scrappy - Bred 2 Die - Born 2 Live ===
- 03. "Young & Famous" (feat. Stay Fresh)
- 11. "The Situation" (feat. Nook)

== 2007 ==
=== DJ Khaled - We the Best ===
- 09. "S on My Chest" (feat. Lil Wayne & Birdman)

=== Chamillionaire - Ultimate Victory ===
- 01. "The Morning News"
- 03. "Standing Ovation"
- 04. "Won't Let You Down" (feat. KC)
- 13. "The Evening News"
- 14. "Welcome to the South" (feat. Pimp C)

=== Brisco ===
- 00. "In The Hood" (feat. Lil Wayne)

=== Birdman - 5 * Stunna ===
- 02. "Fully Loaded"
- 23. "S on My Chest" (feat. Lil Wayne) (iTunes bonus track)

G nako - jiachie

== 2008 ==
=== Flo Rida - Mail on Sunday ===
- 08. "Still Missin'"
  - Sample Credit: "Jazzy Belle" by Outkast

=== Plies - Definition of Real ===
- 16. "Thug Section" (Best Buy bonus track)

=== Big Kuntry King - My Turn to Eat ===
- 07. "Love You the Right Way" (feat. Lloyd)

== 2009 ==
=== B.G. - Too Hood 2 Be Hollywood ===
- 00. "I Rather Die" (feat. 2Pac)
- 00. "I Rather Die (Remix)" (feat. Maino & 2Pac)

=== Gorilla Zoe - Don't Feed da Animals ===
- 01. "Untamed Gorilla" (feat. JC)

=== Lil Scrappy - The Grustle ===
- 00. "Thug It To The Bone" (feat. Trey Songz)
- 00. "Livin' The Life" (feat. Razah)

=== Young Money - We Are Young Money ===
- 04. "Wife Beater"
- 09. "Bedrock" (feat. Lloyd)
- 11. "Steady Mobbin'" (feat. Gucci Mane)
- 13. "She Is Gone"

== 2010 ==
=== Yelawolf - Trunk Muzik ===
- 12. "Mixin' Up the Medicine (Remix)" (feat. Juelz Santana)

=== Diggy Simmons - Airborne ===
- 10. "You Got Me Now" (feat. Jacob Latimore)

=== Trey Songz - Passion, Pain & Pleasure ===
- 05. "Bottoms Up" (feat. Nicki Minaj)
- 17. "You Just Need Me" (produced with J-Mike)

=== Lil Wayne - I Am Not a Human Being ===
- 01. "Gonorrhea" (feat. Drake)
- 07. "Right Above It" (feat. Drake)

=== Nicki Minaj - Pink Friday ===
- 01. "I'm the Best"
- 11. "Dear Old Nicki"
- 14. "Super Bass" (Deluxe edition bonus tracks)
- 20. "Bedrock" (Young Money feat. Lloyd) (Japan bonus tracks)

=== Bei Maejor - Upside Down 2 ===
- 05. "Wife U Up"

=== Rick Ross - The Albert Anastasia EP ===
- 07. "All I Need" (feat. Birdman & Trey Songz)

=== Slick Pulla - The Bobby Drake Chronicles ===
- 09. "All About Money" (feat. Magazeen, 211, Swazy Baby & DJ Bigga Rankin')

== 2011 ==
=== Sean Kingston - King of Kingz ===
- 09. "One Way"

=== Lupe Fiasco - Lasers ===
- 06. "The Show Goes On"
  - Sample Credit: "Float On" by Modest Mouse

=== Ace Hood - Body Bag Vol.1 ===
- 04. "Try'n (feat. T-Pain)"

=== New Boyz - Too Cool to Care ===
- 04. "I Don't Care" (feat. Big Sean) (produced with Roahn “First Born” Hylton)
- 08. "Zonin'" (produced with J-Mike)
- 10. "Can’t Nobody" (feat. Shanell)
- 16. "Beautiful Dancer" (feat. Charlie Wilson) (produced with Diplo) (Deluxe Edition)

=== Yo Gotti - CM6: Gangsta of the Year ===
- 10. "What It Iz Homie"
- 15. "100" (feat. Zed Zilla & Sylver Karatz)"
- 18. "On Everything"

=== Roscoe Dash - Dash Effect ===
- 11. "Keep Em Coming"
- 31. "Good Good Night"

== 2012 ==
=== Nicki Minaj - Pink Friday: Roman Reloaded ===
- 18. "Gun Shot" (feat. Beenie Man)

=== Slaughterhouse - Welcome to: Our House ===
- 14. "Park It Sideways"
- 20. "Place to Be" (feat. B.o.B)

=== T. Mills - Thrillionaire ===
- 05. "Busy Bitch"

=== DJ Drama - Quality Street Music ===
- 04. "We in This Bitch"(feat. Young Jeezy, T.I., Ludacris & Future)
- 15. "We in This Bitch 1.5" (feat. Drake & Future)

=== Meek Mill - Dreams and Nightmares ===
- 09. "Lay Up" (feat. Wale, Rick Ross, & Trey Songz)

== 2013 ==
=== Alley Boy - War Cry ===
- 00. "Icey" (leftover track)

=== Fat Trel - SDMG ===
- 17. "Kalifornia Living"

== 2014 ==
=== G-Eazy - These Things Happen ===
- 00. "The Day It All Changed" (leftover track) (produced with LUCA)

=== Wiz Khalifa - Blacc Hollywood ===
- 13. "True Colors" (feat. Nicki Minaj)

=== August Alsina - Testimony ===
- 00. "Like a Star" (leftover track)

=== Nicki Minaj - The Pinkprint ===
- 15. "Bed of Lies" (feat. Skylar Grey)
- 16. "Grand Piano"

=== Lil Bibby - Free Crack 2 ===
- 12. "What You Live For"

== 2015 ==
=== Casey Veggies - Live & Grow ===
- 00. "Tied Up" (feat. DeJ Loaf) (produced with LUCA)

=== Lil Boosie ===
- 13. "All I Know" (feat. PJ) (produced with JMike)

=== Lil Wayne - "Free Weezy Album" ===
- 2. "He's Dead"

=== G-Eazy - "When It's Dark Out" ===
- 17. "Nothing To Me" (feat. E-40 & Keyshia Cole) (Produced with TODAY)

== 2016 ==
=== Yo Gotti - "The Art of Hustle" ===
- 05. "The Art of Hustle"

=== Flo Rida - "Single" ===
- 17. "Hello Friday" (feat. Jason DeRulo) (produced with TODAY)

== Upcoming ==
=== Birdman - Bigga Than Life ===
- 00. "Loyalty" (feat. Lil Wayne & Tyga)

=== Mike Posner - Pages ===
- 00. "Living My Life" (feat. 2 Chainz)
