= List of Universal Motown Republic artists =

This is a list of Universal Motown Republic Group musical artists.

== Universal Motown ==
- Akon
- Ashley Ring
- Avery
- Birdman
- Brisco
- Bow Wow
- Erykah Badu
- Drake Bell
- Blue October
- Ron Browz
- Vita Chambers
- Cap 1
- Corneille
- Cory Gunz
- Crash Kings
- Kid Cudi
- Kat Deluna
- Days Difference
- Down With Webster
- Drake
- DJ Drama
- DJ Khaled
- Four Year Strong
- Forever the Sickest Kids
- Flobots
- Get Scared
- Gudda Gudda
- Hyper Crush
- Jada
- JoJo
- Kaiser Chiefs
- Kelly Rowland
- Kem
- Reni Lane
- Little Fish
- Lil Chuckee
- Lil' Kim
- Lil Twist
- Mack Maine
- Maino (rapper)
- Maloco Júnior
- Melanie Fiona
- Glasses Malone
- Jadyn Maria
- Jae Millz
- Katie Melua
- Nicki Minaj
- J.R. Get Money
- Colin Munroe
- Nelly
- Pac Div
- Paper Route
- Tina Parol
- Pixie Lott
- After Midnight Project
- Q-Tip
- Busta Rhymes
- Rick Ross
- Jimmy Robbins
- Asher Roth
- SafetySuit
- Shanell
- Short Dawg
- Raven-Symoné
- T Lopez
- T-Streets
- Tina Parol
- Tyga
- The Veer Union
- Waii
- Lil Wayne
- Tionne "T-Boz" Watkins
- Stevie Wonder

== Universal Republic ==
- Anberlin
- Alter Bridge
- India.Arie
- Cash Cash
- Chamillionaire
- Colbie Caillat
- Owl City
- 3 Doors Down
- Kate Earl
- Flobots
- Michael Franti
- Godsmack
- Jay Sean
- Erik Hassle
- Hinder
- Blak Jak
- The Lonely Island
- Lil Jon
- Kevin Rudolf
- Leighton Meester
- Steel Panther
- C-Side
- Spose
- We Are the Fallen
- Karl Wolf
- YC
- 10 Years

== Casablanca Records ==
- Mika
- Ryan Leslie
- Mike Tower

== SRC Records ==
- Akon
- David Banner
- Tami Chynn
- Asher Roth
- Shontelle
- Tionne "T-Boz" Watkins
- Marky
- Aubrey O'Day
