= Rich Gang (album) =

Studio album by Rich Gang
- Released: July 23, 2013
- Genre: Hip-hop
- Length: 53:51
- Labels: YMCMB; Young Money; Cash Money; Republic
- Producers: Ronald "Slim" Williams; Birdman; Lil Wayne; Boi-1da; Matthew Burnett; Jordan Evans; Detail; Southside; TM88; S-X; R. Kelly; Ronnie D. Music; Nonstop da Hitman; The MeKanics; Spiff TV; Bei Maejor; The Runners; soFLY & Nius; I.N.F.O.; Kane Beatz; Kevin Rudolf; MGEEZY

Rich Gang chronology
| Rich Gang: All Stars (2013) | Rich Gang (2013) | Rich Gang: Tha Tour Pt. 1 (2014) |

Young Money Entertainment chronology
| We Are Young Money (2009) | Rich Gang (2013) | Young Money: Rise of an Empire (2014) |

Singles from Rich Gang
- 1. "Tapout" Released: March 19, 2013; 2. "We Been On" Released: July 16, 2013; 3. "50 Plates" Released: July 16, 2013

Rich Gang is the debut studio album by the American supergroup Rich Gang. The album was released July 23, 2013, by Young Money Cash Money Billionaires (YMCMB), Young Money Entertainment, Cash Money Records, and Republic Records. The album contains contributions from several YMCMB members, including Birdman, Lil Wayne, Nicki Minaj, Tyga, Mack Maine, Limp Bizkit, Bow Wow, Ace Hood, Jae Millz, Cory Gunz, Gudda Gudda, Caskey, Detail, Busta Rhymes and Mystikal. The album also features guest appearances from artists outside the labels, including Future, Meek Mill, French Montana, T.I., Yo Gotti, Flo Rida, Chris Brown, Rick Ross, the Game, Kendrick Lamar, and R. Kelly. Rich Gang was supported by the three singles: "Tapout" (featuring Future), which peaked at number 45 on the Billboard Hot 100, along with "We Been On" (featuring R. Kelly) and "50 Plates" (performed by Rick Ross).

The album received generally mixed to unfavorable reviews from music critics, and sold 40,000 copies in the US after three weeks.

== Background ==
On February 16, 2013, Birdman released a mixtape titled Rich Gang: All Stars, in promotion of the album. It featured 24 tracks and appearances from Tyga, Jae Millz, Meek Mill, Mack Maine, Busta Rhymes and Mystikal among others. The mixtape featured various YMCMB singles such as Drake's "Started From the Bottom", Tyga's "Dope", Ace Hood's "Bugatti", Lil Wayne's "Love Me" and "Rich As Fuck".

On February 18, 2013, it was announced that Young Money Entertainment and Cash Money Records would be releasing an album under the name Rich Gang, titled Rich Gang: Flashy Lifestyle on May 21, 2013. On May 5, 2013, it was announced that the album would be pushed back until June 25, 2013. In May 2013, during an interview with MTV News, Birdman said even though the project would be released on Cash Money Records, it would feature music from non-YMCMB stars as well, stating: "We have other artists like Future, who is not signed to us but a part of us. French Montana, Rick Ross, Meek Mill and all these [guys] are friends that we rock with and call on. A lot of business we do don't necessarily have to be about money, it's about relationships and this is about people that we have relationships with." On June 10, 2013, the album cover was released and it was pushed back again until July 23, 2013.

It was reported that the album would contain appearances by YMCMB members Lil Wayne, Drake, Nicki Minaj, Mack Maine, Tyga, Bow Wow, Limp Bizkit, Kevin Rudolf, Jae Millz, Gudda Gudda, Caskey, Busta Rhymes, and Mystikal. Artists outside of the record label that were reported to be working on the album included Future, French Montana, T.I., 2 Chainz and Meek Mill in June 2013. The final track list revealed additional features from Rick Ross, Chris Brown, Yo Gotti, Game, Kendrick Lamar, and R. Kelly. Notably Drake was the only artist from YMCMB announced to be on the album, yet not to appear. Birdman addressed this with MTV saying, "Drake was recording out the country and also he wants to "hold on" for the upcoming Big Tymers album.

On June 10, 2013, Cash Money Records released a press release announcing the album's release date, saying: "Without a doubt, this album is one of the best group albums to date. I guarantee that it will be in rotation on every club, at every party and coming out of the speakers of every car, " said Ronald "Slim" Williams, co-founder of Cash Money Records. Slim's brother and partner Bryan "Birdman" Williams, added, "YMCMB is a family, and this album is an example of our bond. We are thrilled to come together, partner with some of our closest friends and create something special for our fans. Think of it as an audio present, from our family, to yours."

== Singles ==
On March 19, 2013, the first official single from the album, titled "Tapout", featuring Lil Wayne, Birdman, Mack Maine, Nicki Minaj and Future, was premiered. Minaj confirmed a music video shoot on March 11, 2013, but it was unknown for what song. Birdman confirmed on his Twitter that the video shoot was for "Tapout". The video was released on May 5, 2013 and features cameo appearances from Kimora Lee Simmons, DJ Khaled, Bow Wow, Paris Hilton and Christina Milian. The song has since peaked at No. 45 on the Billboard Hot 100.

On July 16, 2013, the second and third singles "We Been On" featuring R. Kelly, Birdman and Lil Wayne, and "50 Plates" featuring Rick Ross were released. On August 30, 2013, the music video was released for "50 Plates" featuring cameos from Birdman, Ace Hood, Caskey and Fred Durst. Then on September 3, 2013, the music video for the R. Kelly featuring "We Been On" was premiered on 106 & Park.

On March 5, 2013, the first promotional single from the album, titled "Fly Rich", featuring Stevie J, Future, Tyga, Meek Mill and Mystikal, was released. In mid-July 2013 the second promotional single "100 Favors" featuring Detail, Birdman and Kendrick Lamar was released along with the pre-order for the album on iTunes. On July 22, 2013, the music video for "Dreams Come True" featuring Yo Gotti, Ace Hood, Mack Maine and Birdman premiered on 106 & Park. On August 19, 2013, the music video was released for "Million Dollar" featuring Detail and Future. On December 12, 2013, the music video for "100 Favors" featuring Birdman, Detail and Kendrick Lamar was released.

== Critical response ==
Professional ratings
Aggregate scores
| Source | Rating |
|---|---|
| Metacritic | 47/100 |
Review scores
| Source | Rating |
| AllMusic | 2.5/5 stars |
| Artistdirect | 5/5 stars |
| Exclaim! | 3/10 |
| HipHopDX | 2.5/5 stars |
| Rolling Stone | 2/5 stars |
| XXL | (L) |

Rich Gang was met with mixed reviews from music critics. At Metacritic, which assigns a normalized rating out of 100 to reviews from mainstream critics, the album received an average score of 47, which indicates "mixed or average reviews" based on 6 reviews. Jon Dolan of Rolling Stone gave the album two out of five stars, saying "On this celebratory all-star compilation, Nicki and Weezy (but not Drizzy) are joined by CMYM bench contributors (Cory Gunz, Limp Bizkit, Ace Hood, Mack Maine, Tyga) and non-label heavies (Flo Rida, Rick Ross, Kendrick Lamar, R. Kelly and Chris Brown) for a crowded disc of Maybach waxing and club banging. Lamar drops a marvelously bendy verse on "100 Flavors" and hungry old-timers Mystikal and Busta Rhymes do some gonzo barking on the slippery yacht-rock jam "Everyday." Mostly, though, it's like a crowded party where you don't really get to talk to anyone as long as you'd like." Chris Dart of Exclaim! gave the album a three out of ten, saying "The scientists at Young Money/Cash Money labs deserve to be congratulated for finally managing to synthesize a safe, rap-based alternative to Ambien. At least, that's what it sounds like they were attempting when they recorded this incredibly boring "super-group" album. It features a large chunk of the YMCMB roster, but almost none of them sound like they want to be there. All the songs on Rich Gang bleed into one another; they all have the same slow-to-mid tempo, overproduced, synth-heavy beats; and almost all the rappers sleepwalk through their verses." Dan Rys of XXL gave the album an L, saying "Rich Gang is not especially lyrical, but that's not really a shocker; its strengths lie more in its hooks and club appeal, and it's fully stocked with tracks that demand to be played at ear-shattering and floor-shaking volumes. It's another all-around solid chapter in the Cash Money canon."

David Jeffries of AllMusic gave the album two and half stars out of five, saying "One begins to wonder if Rich Gang the album is simply a scrapped solo album from the label boss, one that was retooled and retitled, then hyped up to look like a Cash Money celebration piece. After all, Young Money superstar Drake is MIA, as is both the usual quality control and Cash Money sense of purpose. Fanatics only; everyone else can grab the singles." Edwin Ortiz of HipHopDX gave the album two and half stars out of five, saying "Rich Gang has its moments, but ultimately does little to establish what is truly compelling of Birdman's latest signees, as well the executive's own place in the Rap game. At best, this is a lateral move from their 2009 release We Are Young Money—which isn't a great indication that their collaborative efforts are progressing. There's no doubt that this project will have traction with some listeners, but that will based on the names involved and not the quality control (or lack thereof) presented."

== Commercial performance ==
The album debuted at number 9 on the Billboard 200 chart, with first-week sales of 24,000 copies in the United States. In its second week the album sold 9,600 more copies. In its third week the album sold 6,400 more copies bringing its total album sales to 40,000.

== Track listing ==
Credits adapted from the album's liner notes.

| No. | Title | Writer(s) | Producer(s) | Length |
|---|---|---|---|---|
| 1. | "R.G. (Intro)" (Birdman featuring Mystikal) | Michael Tyler; Matthew Samuels; Matthew Burnett; Jordan Evans | Boi-1da; Burnett; Evans | 2:53 |
| 2. | "Million Dollar" (Birdman featuring Detail and Future) | Noel Fisher; Nayvadius Wilburn | Detail | 2:27 |
| 3. | "Tapout" (Birdman featuring Lil Wayne. Mack Maine, Nicki Minaj and Future) | Wilburn; Fisher; Joshua Luellen; Bryan Simmons; Bryan Williams; Dwayne Carter Jr.; Jermaine Preyan; Onika Maraj | Southside; TM88; Detail; S-X | 4:35 |
| 4. | "We Been On" (Birdman featuring R. Kelly and Lil Wayne) | Williams; Carter Jr.; Robert Kelly; Ronnie D; Joseph Angel | R. Kelly; Ronnie D Music^{[a]} | 5:32 |
| 5. | "Dreams Come True" (Birdman featuring Yo Gotti, Ace Hood and Mack Maine) | Williams; Preyan; Antoine McColister; Mario Mims; Gary Fountaine | Nonstop Da Hitman | 4:39 |
| 6. | "50 Plates" (Birdman featuring Rick Ross) | William Roberts II; Michael Hernandez; Carlos Suarez | The Mekanics; Spiff TV | 3:26 |
| 7. | "Bigger Than Life" (Birdman featuring Chris Brown, Tyga and Lil Wayne) | Williams; Carter Jr.; Fisher; Christopher Brown; Michael Stevenson; Brandon Green | Detail; Bei Maejor | 4:43 |
| 8. | "100 Favors" (Birdman featuring Detail, Kendrick Lamar) | Williams; Fisher; Kendrick Duckworth; Brian Soko | Detail | 4:08 |
| 9. | "Everyday" (Birdman featuring Cory Gunz, Mystikal and Busta Rhymes) | Williams; Tyler; Trevor Smith; John Christopher; Peter Pankey | I.N.F.O. | 4:13 |
| 10. | "Burn the House" (Birdman featuring Detail) | Williams; Fisher | Detail | 4:25 |
| 11. | "Panties to the Side" (Birdman featuring French Montana, Tyga, Bow Wow and Gudda Gudda) | Williams; Karim Kharbouch; Andrew Harr; Jermaine Jackson; Stevenson; Shad Moss; Carl Lilly | The Runners | 4:21 |
| 12. | "Angel" (Birdman featuring Mystikal, Jae Millz, Ace Hood, Gudda Gudda and Mack Maine) | Williams; Fisher; Tyler; Lilly; McColister; Preyan; Jarvis Mills; Raphael Judrin; Pierre Antoine Melki; Yoan Chirescu | soFLY & Nius | 4:10 |
| 13. | "Sunshine" (Birdman featuring Limp Bizkit, Flo Rida and Caskey) | Williams; Preyan; Fisher; Brandon Caskey; Andre Proctor; Tramar Dillard; Fred Durst | Detail | 4:07 |
| Total length: | | | | 53:51 |

Deluxe edition (bonus tracks)
| No. | Title | Writer(s) | Producer(s) | Length |
|---|---|---|---|---|
| 14. | "Have It Your Way" (Birdman featuring T.I. and Lil Wayne) | Williams; Carter Jr.; Clifford Harris Jr.; Daniel Johnson | Kane Beatz | 4:23 |
| 15. | "Paint Tha Town" (Birdman featuring Game and Lil Wayne) | Williams; Carter Jr.; Christopher; Jaceyon Taylor | I.N.F.O. | 5:14 |
| 16. | "Fly Rich" (Birdman featuring Stevie J, Future, Tyga, Meek Mill and Mystikal) | Tyler; Cash; Stevenson; Robert Williams; Steven Jordan; Sam Gumbley | S-X | 4:35 |

Best Buy deluxe edition (bonus tracks)
| No. | Title | Writer(s) | Producer(s) | Length |
|---|---|---|---|---|
| 17. | "Here We Are" (Birdman featuring Kevin Rudolf, Limp Bizkit and Lil Wayne) | Williams; Carter Jr.; Durst; Kevin Rudolf | Kevin Rudolf | 3:43 |
| 18. | "Savage" (Birdman featuring Jae Millz and T. Rone) | Mills; Williams; Staten | MGEEZY | 4:52 |

Notes

- ^{^[a]} signifies a co-producer

== Personnel ==
Credits adapted from AllMusic.

- Ace Hood – featured artist
- J. Angel – arranger
- Ronnie D. Joseph Angel – composer
- Chris Athens – mastering
- Inderan K. Bailey – engineer
- Joshua Berkman – A&R
- Birdman – featured artist
- Sam Boh – mixing assistant
- Bow Wow – featured artist
- Chris Brown – composer, featured artist
- Sean Buchanan – assistant engineer, mixing assistant
- Matthew Burnett – composer, producer
- Busta Rhymes – featured artist
- Katina Bynum – project manager
- Michael "Banger" Cadahia – engineer
- Dwayne Carter – composer, executive producer
- Nayvadius "Future" Cash – composer
- Caskey – featured artist, composer
- Yoan Chirescu – composer, guitars on "Angel"
- Ariel Chobaz – engineer
- John Christopher – composer
- Thomas Cullison – mixing assistant
- Kyle DenMead – engineer
- Detail – featured artist, producer
- Tramar Dillard – composer
- Cory Gunz – featured artist
- Fred Durst – composer
- Jordan Evans – composer, producer
- Noel Fisher – composer, mixing
- Flo Rida – featured artist
- Gary Fountaine – composer
- French Montana – featured artist
- Future – featured artist
- Gudda Gudda – featured artist
- Andrew Harr – composer
- Michael Hernandez – composer
- I.N.F.O – producer
- Jermaine Jackson – composer
- Jess Jackson – engineer
- Chad Jolley – engineer
- Brandon Jones – engineer
- Raphaël Judrin – composer
- R. Kelly – arranger, featured artist, producer, composer
- Karim Kharbouch – composer
- Kendrick Lamar – composer, featured artist
- Ed Lidow – engineer
- Lil Wayne – featured artist
- Carl Lilly – composer
- Limp Bizkit – featured artist
- Mack Maine – featured artist
- Onika Maraj – composer
- Fabian Marasciullo – mixing
- Antoine McColister – composer
- The Mekanics – producer
- Pierre-Antoine Melki – composer
- Jae Millz – featured artist
- Jarvis Mills – composer
- Mario Mims – composer
- Nicki Minaj – featured artist
- Shad Moss – composer
- Mystikal – featured artist
- Nius – producer
- Nonstop Da Hitman – producer
- Peter Pankey – composer
- Jermaine Preyan – composer
- Andre Proctor – composer
- Rich Gang – primary artist
- T.I. – featured artist
- William Roberts – composer
- Andy Rodriguez – assistant engineer
- Rick Ross – featured artist
- Tyrone Staten – composer
- The Runners – producer
- Fareed Salamah – engineer, mixing
- Matthew Samuels – composer, producer
- Trevor Smith – composer
- SoFLY – producer
- Brian Soko – composer
- Spiff TV – producer
- Michael Stevenson – composer
- Carlos Suarez – composer
- Rich Homie Quan – featured artist
- Young Thug – featured artist
- Young Rich – featured artist
- Tyga – featured artist
- Michael Tyler – composer
- Bryan "Baby Birdman" Williams – executive producer, composer
- Ronald "Slim Tha Don" Williams – executive producer, mixing
- Yo Gotti – featured artist
- T. Rone – featured artist

== Charts ==
=== Weekly charts ===
| Chart (2013) | Peak position |
|---|---|
| UK R&B Albums (Official Charts) | 23 |
| US Billboard 200 | 9 |
| US Billboard Top R&B/Hip-Hop Albums | 2 |
| US Billboard Top Rap Albums | 2 |

=== Year-end charts ===
| Chart (2013) | Position |
|---|---|
| US Top R&B/Hip-Hop Albums | 76 |
