= Every Girl (Young Money song) =

Single by Young Money

from the album We Are Young Money
- Released: April 6, 2009 (Radio); June 11, 2009 (Digital); July 26, 2010 (UK)
- Recorded: 2008
- Genre: Dirty rap
- Length: 4:49 (single); 5:13 (album)
- Label: Young Money; Cash Money; Universal Motown
- Songwriters: Dwayne Carter; Aubrey Graham; Jarvis Mills; Jermaine Preyan; Carl Lilly
- Producer: Tha Bizness

Young Money singles chronology
| "Every Girl" (2009) | "BedRock" (2009) |

Lil Wayne singles chronology
| "Down" (2009) | "Every Girl" (2009) | "Money to Blow" (2009) |

Drake singles chronology
| "Successful" (2009) | "Every Girl" (2009) | "The One" (2009) |

Jae Millz singles chronology
| "Every Girl" (2009) | "BedRock" (2009) |

Gudda Gudda singles chronology
| "Every Girl" (2009) | "BedRock" (2009) |

Mack Maine singles chronology
| "Every Girl" (2009) | "Tapout" (2013) |

"Every Girl" (album version titled "Every Girl in the World") is a song by rap group Young Money released as the first single from their debut collaboration album titled We Are Young Money. It was legally released to the iTunes Store on June 11, 2009. Young Money Entertainment rappers Lil Wayne, Drake, Jae Millz, Gudda Gudda, and Mack Maine perform on the track. The video was shot on February 13, 2009, and was released on April 6. The song was leaked to the internet on January 28, 2009, just a day after "Prom Queen" was officially released.

A few lines of "Every Girl" are recycled from an unreleased song by Lil Wayne and Mack Maine titled "Throw It Back", which was produced by Kane Beatz. AutoTune can be heard.

== Background ==
In 2025, Lil Wayne's daughter Reginae Carter claimed that her father's involvement on "Every Girl" was the reason that the Disney Channel did not want to go through with a project of hers. This was because of Mack Maine's lyric "In about three years, holler at me Miley Cyrus", written when Cyrus was only 16 years old.

== Music video ==
The video for "Every Girl" was released on April 6, 2009, and features the Young Money artists and animation from humorous pop-up words and sentences and distortion of a silver Rolls-Royce Phantom in the video. Former Danity Kane member D. Woods makes a cameo appearance in the video with Birdman as well as Young Money artists Lil Chuckee and Lil Twist. The song was written by Christopher Hicks, from the NDSS incorporation. The video was directed by Dwayne Carter, Jeff Panzer and Kimberly Stuckwisch.

It ranked at #12 on BET's Notarized: Top 100 Videos of 2009 countdown.

== Charts ==
=== Weekly charts ===
| Chart (2009) | Peak position |
|---|---|
| US Billboard Hot 100 | 10 |
| US Pop Airplay (Billboard) | 40 |
| US Hot R&B/Hip-Hop Songs (Billboard) | 2 |
| US Hot Rap Songs (Billboard) | 2 |
| US Rhythmic Airplay (Billboard) | 2 |

=== Year-end charts ===
| Chart (2009) | Position |
|---|---|
| US Billboard Hot 100 | 67 |
| US Hot R&B/Hip-Hop Songs (Billboard) | 12 |
| US Rhythmic (Billboard) | 21 |

== Remixes ==
A remix of the song was released by Nappy Boy Entertainment featuring T-Pain, Tay Dizm, Young Cash, and Travis McCoy. The video, filmed in the NB Mansion, debuted on the Nappy Boy website.

There are also remixes of this song by R. Kelly, Tyga, Sammie, Red Cafe, Trey Songz and Kirko Bangz. Rapper Shawnna also did a freestyle to the song.

R&B singer K. Michelle released a response track titled "Fakin' It", featuring Missy Elliott.
