= 6 Foot 7 Foot =

Single by Lil Wayne featuring Cory Gunz

from the album Tha Carter IV
- Released: December 16, 2010
- Recorded: 2010
- Genre: Hip hop
- Length: 4:09
- Label: Young Money; Cash Money; Universal Motown
- Songwriters: Dwayne Carter, Jr.; Peter Pankey, Jr.; Shondrae Crawford
- Producer: Bangladesh

Lil Wayne singles chronology
"Fire Flame" (2010)	"6 Foot 7 Foot" (2010)	"Welcome to My Hood" (2011)

Music video
- "6 Foot 7 Foot" on YouTube

"6 Foot 7 Foot" is a song by rapper Lil Wayne featuring label mate Cory Gunz, released via iTunes on December 16, 2010 as the lead single from Wayne's ninth album Tha Carter IV (2011). Produced by Bangladesh, who also produced "A Milli", a previous hit of Wayne's, the song samples Harry Belafonte's "Day-O (The Banana Boat Song)" (particularly, as the title implies, the lyric "6 foot, 7 foot, 8 foot bunch".)

== Background ==
"6 Foot 7 Foot" is the first single Lil Wayne recorded following his release from prison on November 4, 2010, though it is the second song on which he has appeared since his prison release, after the final version of Birdman's single "Fire Flame", on which he had 2 verses. In the original version of the single, Lil Wayne is absent due to his prison sentence. Before the song was officially released, Shade 45's DJ Drama interviewed Lil Wayne and he talked about the single. He said "It's a monster," and "Hopefully, it shows people where I'm at lyrically." Mack Maine, president of Young Money and fellow labelmate, called it "A Milli on steroids." The track was originally intended for rapper T.I., but the Atlantic Records manager who also co-managed Lil Wayne decided Lil Wayne would be a better fit. Lil Wayne and producer Bangladesh reunited for the first time since "A Milli" after the royalty dispute between Bangladesh and Cash Money on that song. It is the second time the trio (Lil Wayne, Cory Gunz, Bangladesh) have worked together, after 2008's "A Milli" (though Cory Gunz was not on the final version of that song). Lil Wayne performed the song on Saturday Night Live and New Year's Eve with Carson Daly. He also performed it on 106 & Party Cash Money Young Money New Years.

== Music video ==
On January 20, 2011, Lil Wayne announced that there would be a music video for the single in the upcoming spring. A picture was uploaded by Rap-Up of Lil Wayne portraying a boxer. Birdman as well as the Young Money crew (excluding Drake, Nicki Minaj, Tyga, Gudda Gudda and Mack Maine) make cameo appearances in the video. The video made premieres on MTV on March 3, 2011, and on BET's 106 & Park on March 4, 2011. The video (directed by Hype Williams) was inspired by the film Inception, with Lil Wayne and the Young Money crew portraying several scenarios from the film and consists of numerous scenes which visualize many of the metaphors and similes Wayne says in the song. The explicit version of the video has received 195 million views as of March 2024 on YouTube, while the clean version of the video has received above 3.5 million views.

== Credits and personnel ==
Recording

- Recorded at CMR South Studios, Miami, FL by Michael Cadahia. Assisted by Edward Lidow.

Personnel

- Mixing – Fabian Marasciullo
- Assistant mixing – Seth Waldman
- Mixed at – Conway Studios, Los Angeles
- Mastering – Dave Kutch (single version); Brian "Big Bass" Gardner (album version)

== Charts and certifications ==
=== Commercial performance ===
"6 Foot 7 Foot" debuted at number 9 in the Billboard Hot 100 chart (week of January 1, 2011) and number 3 on the Digital Songs chart. By January 2013, the song has sold over 3 million digital downloads in the U.S.

=== Weekly charts ===
Chart (2011)	Peak position
Canada (Canadian Hot 100)	50
UK Singles (Official Charts)	71
US Billboard Hot 100	9
US Hot R&B/Hip-Hop Songs (Billboard)	2
US Rap Songs (Billboard)	2
US Rhythmic Airplay (Billboard)	5

=== Year-end charts ===
Chart (2011)	Position
US Billboard Hot 100	41
US Hot R&B/Hip-Hop Songs (Billboard)	13
US Rhythmic (Billboard)	27

=== Certifications ===
Region	Certification	Certified units/sales
United Kingdom (BPI)	Silver	200,000^{‡}
United States (RIAA)	7× Platinum	7,000,000^{‡}
^{‡} Sales+streaming figures based on certification alone.

== Covers ==
On May 10, 2017 Insane Clown Posse, released a cover of the song (entitled "7 Foot 8 Foot") as well as a music video featuring Psychopathic Records artist Lyte.
