= Roger that =

Roger that may refer to:

- Radio phraseology, see Radiotelephony procedure
- "Roger That", a song by rap-label and group Young Money Entertainment
