= Steady Mobbin =

2009 song by Young Money featuring Gucci Mane

Single by Young Money featuring Gucci Mane

from the album We Are Young Money
- Released: January 26, 2010
- Recorded: 2009
- Genre: Hip hop
- Length: 5:10
- Label: Young Money; Cash Money; Universal Motown
- Songwriters: Dwayne Carter Jr.; Radric Davis; Daniel Johnson
- Producer: Kane Beatz

Young Money singles chronology
"BedRock" (2009)	"Steady Mobbin" (2010)	"Roger That" (2010)

Lil Wayne singles chronology
"Drop the World" (2010)	"Steady Mobbin" (2010)	"I Made It (Cash Money Heroes)" (2010)

Gucci Mane singles chronology
"Bingo" (2010)	"Steady Mobbin" (2010)	"Atlanta, GA" (2010)

Music video
- "We Be Steady Mobbin" on YouTube

"Steady Mobbin" (also titled "We Be Steady Mobbin") is a song by American hip hop record label Young Money Entertainment and the third single from their debut compilation album We Are Young Money (2009). It is performed by Lil Wayne and features American rapper Gucci Mane. The song originally also featured American rapper 2 Chainz but he was removed for unknown reasons.

== Critical reception ==
Steve Kerry of HotNewHipHop gave a positive review, writing "Lil Wayne's chances in this game are improving with each new release, and We Be Steady Mobbin is no exception - quite the opposite, in fact. It's a nice addition to the impressive catalogue Lil Wayne has been building over the years."

== Music video ==
The music video was directed by DJ Scoob Doo and premiered on July 4, 2010 on MTV. The rappers shot their scenes for the clip separately; Lil Wayne filmed his part right before he went to the Rikers Island prison to start his year-long sentence for attempted gun possession. In the video, he gives a tour of his Miami home, where he shows his art collection, smokes blunts and uses one of his Grammy statues as an ashtray. Gucci Mane filmed his scene after he was released from prison a week after Wayne turned himself in.

== Charts ==
=== Weekly charts ===
Chart (2009–2010)	Peak position
US Billboard Hot 100	48
US Hot R&B/Hip-Hop Songs (Billboard)	17
US Hot Rap Songs (Billboard)	6
US Rhythmic Airplay (Billboard)	18

=== Year-end charts ===
Chart (2010)	Position
US Hot R&B/Hip-Hop Songs (Billboard)	50

== Certifications ==
Region	Certification	Certified units/sales
United States (RIAA)	2× Platinum	2,000,000^{‡}
^{‡} Sales+streaming figures based on certification alone.
