= Roger That =

Single by Young Money

from the album We Are Young Money
- Released: March 23, 2010
- Recorded: 2009
- Genre: Hip-hop
- Length: 3:29
- Label: Young Money; Cash Money; Universal Motown
- Songwriters: Dwayne Carter; Onika Maraj; Michael Stevenson
- Producer: Phenom

Young Money singles chronology
"Steady Mobbin" (2009)	"Roger That" (2010)	"Tapout" (2013)

Lil Wayne singles chronology
"I Made It (Cash Money Heroes)" (2010)	"Roger That" (2010)	"Miss Me" (2010)

Nicki Minaj singles chronology
"Get It All" (2010)	"Roger That" (2010)	"Massive Attack" (2010)

Tyga singles chronology
"BedRock" (2009)	"Roger That" (2010)	"Deuces" (2010)

"Roger That" is a song by American record label and hip hop collective Young Money, released as the third single from their debut collaboration album We Are Young Money. It is performed by Young Money founder Lil Wayne, as well as label newcomers Nicki Minaj and Tyga. The video was released on March 1, 2010, alongside "Girl I Got You".

The song received generally positive reviews by critics, most of which favored Minaj's contribution to the song over the others. "Roger That" debuted and peaked at number 56 on the Billboard Hot 100, number 15 on the Hot R&B/Hip-Hop Songs and number 6 on the Billboard Rap Songs.

== Background ==
Nicki Minaj stated on her Twitter that all three rappers featured on the song never actually met the song's producer, Phenom. Minaj stated the drum beat was sent to her by Gmail who sent it to Lil Wayne which later led to the song being released on the We Are Young Money LP with all three rappers adding verses.

In the 2010 Sucker Free Summit, Lil Wayne's verse in the song was nominated for the Verse of the Year award along with label-mate Nicki Minaj for her verse in "My Chick Bad".

== Critical reception ==
XXL gave Minaj a positive review on the song stating, "On 'Roger That', for instance, YM's female MC Nicki Minaj steals the spotlight". HipHopDX also favored Minaj's verse but stated the track would be better without Wayne stating, "Nicki Minaj owns most of the tracks she's present on including 'Roger That' and 'Fuck da Bullshit', two more songs that could've done without Wayne." Planet Ill gave the song a negative review stating " 'Roger That' is the final breath for an album that's lifeless by its end." Nathan S. of DJ Booth gave the song a mixed review commenting on Minaj as part of the whole album but predictable in "Roger That" stating, "Nicki Minaj can't be ignored, although over the course of an album her wild style can become oddly predictable (especially on 'Roger That', where she sounds almost bored)."

== Music video ==
The music video was released on March 1, 2010, the day before Lil Wayne was supposed to be sentenced to jail after the second postponing and same day as the premiere of Lil Twist and Lil Chuckee's "Girl I Got You". The video was shot entirely with a green-screen and pays homage to the film Sin City and bases a more adult story of Who Framed Roger Rabbit. The video features Lil Wayne, Tyga & Nicki Minaj and also featured the others artists in Young Money at the time except for Drake and T-Streets.

== Charts ==
=== Weekly charts ===
Chart (2010)	Peak position
US Billboard Hot 100	56
US Hot R&B/Hip-Hop Songs (Billboard)	15
US Hot Rap Songs (Billboard)	6
US Rhythmic Airplay (Billboard)	28

=== Year-end charts ===
Chart (2010)	Position
US Hot R&B/Hip-Hop Songs (Billboard)	82
