= BedRock =

Single by Young Money featuring Lloyd

from the album We Are Young Money
- Released: November 14, 2009
- Recorded: 2009
- Studio: YM/CM Studios (Miami, FL)
- Genre: Hip hop; R&B
- Length: 4:48
- Label: Young Money; Cash Money; Universal Motown
- Songwriters: Dwayne Carter; Aubrey Graham; Lloyd Polite; Carl Lilly; Onika Maraj; Micheal Stevenson; Jarvis Mills; Daniel Johnson; Stephen Garrett; Timothy Mosley; Jasper Cameron
- Producer: Kane Beatz

Young Money singles chronology
"Every Girl" (2009)	"BedRock" (2009)	"Steady Mobbin" (2010)

Lil Wayne singles chronology
"Maybach Music 2" (2009)	"BedRock" (2009)	"Drop the World" (2009)

Gudda Gudda singles chronology
"Every Girl" (2009)	"BedRock" (2009)

Nicki Minaj singles chronology
"BedRock" (2009)	"Up Out My Face" (2010)

Drake singles chronology
"Say Something" (2009)	"BedRock" (2009)	"4 My Town (Play Ball)" (2009)

Tyga singles chronology
"Coconut Juice" (2008)	"BedRock" (2009)	"Roger That" (2010)

Jae Millz singles chronology
"Every Girl" (2009)	"BedRock" (2009)

Lloyd singles chronology
"Year of the Lover" (2009)	"BedRock" (2009)	"Any Girl" (2010)

Music video
- "BedRock" on YouTube

"BedRock" is the second single by hip hop group/record label Young Money Entertainment from their debut collaboration album, We Are Young Money (2009). It is performed by acts that were signed under Young Money, including rap verses (in order) by Lil Wayne, Gudda Gudda, Nicki Minaj as her debut single, Drake, Tyga, Jae Millz, with the chorus performed by Lloyd. (Note: Lloyd is credited as a featured artist due to not being a member of Young Money.) "BedRock" is also featured as a bonus track on the Japanese, New Zealand, and the "Complete Edition" 2020 reissue editions of Nicki Minaj's debut studio album, Pink Friday and is also featured on Lil Wayne's greatest hits album I Am Music.

== Background and composition ==
After being leaked in September 2009 to Lil Wayne fan sites, "BedRock" was finally released on November 14, 2009. It was originally titled "Girl You Know" (the fan sites to which the single was leaked titled it "BedRock/Girl You Know") and the chorus was sung by Omarion and Lil Wayne's verse was different, but due to Omarion's departure from Young Money, he was replaced by Lloyd. The song was originally planned to be released as the 3rd official single of the album, however due to popular demand by fans it was released as the 2nd single.

Drake interpolates "Are You That Somebody" by Aaliyah in his verse, "Girl, I gotta watch my back, cuz I'm not just anybody." In August 2011, Done Deal Enterprises filed a copyright infringement lawsuit against Lil Wayne, Cash Money, Young Money, and Universal over the song. Blue Marley from Done Deal claims that he wrote "BedRock" with the same name and various other parts of the track months before Young Money's version.

The song is performed in the key of E♭ major with a tempo of 148 beats per minute. It follows a sequence of A♭-B♭-E♭-B♭/D-Cm-Gm, reusing the beat from Travis Porter's song "A.D.I.D.A.S."

== Music video ==
"BedRock"'s music video, directed by Dayo and Lil Wayne, was shot on October 21 and released on December 7, 2009, and debuted on BET's 106 & Park. The video was featured on MTV Jams that same morning and was posted to MTV.com in January 2010. Cameo appearances are made by ZC, Nixo, Birdman, LoLoFoSho, Lil Chuckee, Beverly, Short Dawg, Winston, Shanell, NBA player J. R. Smith, Mack Maine, and Jay Rock. It features the members of Young Money in a house in Davie, Florida with Lloyd who sings the chorus. They are later seen outside near the swimming pool of the house.

== Alternate versions ==
There are five versions of "BedRock". The first is titled "Girl You Know", and Omarion sings the chorus. The second version features Lloyd singing the chorus with Lil Wayne's verse slightly different. This version is the only one to have Lloyd saying, "Young Lloyd, Young Moolah, baby" at the end. This version can be found on Gudda Gudda's mixtape, Guddaville. In the third version, Lil Wayne's verse is slightly different from the first two versions, and he says, "Young Moolah, baby" in place of Lloyd. This is the version that was released as a single and appears on the album. The last version, titled "BedRock Part II", is the official remix. Tyga, Nicki Minaj, Gudda Gudda, and Jae Millz' verses were all replaced with new verses by Lloyd. Lil Wayne's and Drake's verse on this version is the same as on the second version. In the original music video of "BedRock", when Drake sings, "I love your sushi roll..." a plumper Nicki was sitting against the wall. Now in place is another girl with a "sushi roll". The fifth version is by Rasheeda, Diamond, Kandi, Lola Monroe, and Toya Wright. Kandi sings the chorus but replaces "Mr. Flintstone" with "Mrs. Flintstone."

== Chart performance ==
"BedRock" debuted at #36 on the Billboard Hot 100 on the week ending December 12, 2009. On the week ending March 13, 2010, the song reached a peak of #2, only behind "Imma Be" by The Black Eyed Peas, making it the most successful single by the group on the chart.

"BedRock" debuted in the UK Singles Chart on 6 February 2010 at #40. On March 6, 2010, the single climbed to #22, and the subsequent week the single climbed to #18, marking Young Money's first Top 20 hit in the UK. On March 27, 2010, the single rose to #12, peaking at #9 on April 3, 2010, making it Young Money's first Top 10 hit in the UK. In the UK R&B Chart, the single has peaked at #5.

== Charts ==
=== Weekly charts ===
Chart (2009–2010)	Peak position
Belgium (Ultratip Bubbling Under Flanders)	3
Belgium (Ultratip Bubbling Under Wallonia)	12
Brazilian Hot 100 (Billboard Brasil)	25
Canada (Canadian Hot 100)	12
Europe (Eurochart Hot 100)	36
Ireland (IRMA)	17
New Zealand (Recorded Music NZ)	21
UK Singles (OCC)	9
UK Hip Hop/R&B (OCC)	5
US Billboard Hot 100	2
US Billboard Hot R&B/Hip-Hop Songs	2
US Billboard Rap Songs	1
US Billboard Pop Songs	6
US Rhythmic Airplay (Billboard)	1

=== Year-end charts ===
Chart (2010)	Position
Brazil (Crowley)	95
Canadian Hot 100	63
UK Singles Chart	77
US Billboard Hot 100	13
US Billboard Pop Songs	38
US Billboard Hot R&B/Hip-Hop Songs	21
US Billboard Rhythmic Songs	4

== Certifications ==
Region	Certification	Certified units/sales
New Zealand (RMNZ)	Platinum	30,000^{‡}
United Kingdom (BPI)	Platinum	600,000^{‡}
United States (RIAA)	7× Platinum	7,000,000^{‡}
United States (RIAA) Mastertone	Platinum	1,000,000^{*}
^{*} Sales figures based on certification alone.^{‡} Sales+streaming figures based on certification alone.

== Release history ==
Release dates and formats for "BedRock"
Region	Date	Format	Label(s)	Ref.
United States	January 12, 2010	Mainstream airplay	Universal Motown	
