= Tapout (song) =

Single by Rich Gang featuring Future

from the album Rich Gang
- B-side: "Fly Rich"
- Released: March 12, 2013
- Recorded: 2012–2013
- Genre: Hip hop; dirty rap; trap
- Length: 4:44
- Label: Cash Money; Young Money; Republic
- Songwriters: Dwayne Carter; Nayvadius Wilburn; Noel Fisher; Onika Tanya Maraj; Jermaine Preyan; Bryan Williams; Joshua Luellen; Bryan Simmons
- Producers: Southside; TM88; Detail

Rich Gang singles chronology
"Tapout" (2013)	"Lifestyle" (2014)

Young Money singles chronology
"Roger That" (2010)	"Tapout" (2013)	"We Alright" (2014)

Lil Wayne singles chronology
"Karate Chop" (2013)	"Tapout" (2013)	"Rich As Fuck" (2013)

Birdman singles chronology
"Born Stunna" (2012)	"Tapout" (2013)	"We Alright" (2014)

Nicki Minaj singles chronology
"Freaks" (2013)	"Tapout" (2013)	"High School" (2013)

Mack Maine singles chronology
"Every Girl" (2009)	"Tapout" (2013)

Future singles chronology
"U.O.E.N.O." (2013)	"Tapout" (2013)	"Loveeeeeee Song" (2013)

Music video
- "Tapout" on YouTube

"Tapout" is a song released by the American hip hop supergroup Rich Gang featuring fellow American rapper Future. The song features performances from group members Nicki Minaj, Lil Wayne, Birdman and Mack Maine. Produced by Southside & TM88 with co-production and uncredited vocals by Detail, the song is the lead single of the groups debut studio album, premiering on March 12, 2013 and becoming available for digital download on March 19. The song has since peaked at #44 on the Billboard Hot 100.

== Background ==
Birdman confirmed the release of the song on March 12, 2013, and was released that day as planned. The song premiered on Hot 97 with Funkmaster Flex on March 12, 2013. It was officially released as a digital download on March 19, 2013. The song was available as a digital download in UK on March 24, and in France on March 25. On May 7, "Tapout" was released to rhythmic contemporary radio.

== Music video ==
Nicki Minaj confirmed a video shoot on March 11, 2013 but it was unknown for what song. Birdman confirmed on his Twitter that the video shoot was for "Tapout". The video (directed by Hannah Lux Davis) was released on May 5, 2013 and featured cameos from Kimora Lee Simmons, DJ Khaled, Bow Wow, Paris Hilton, Rocko and Christina Milian.

== Critical reception ==
"Tapout" was met with generally positive reviews from music critics. Dan Rys of XXL said, "With Future on the hook, the song was always going to be a memorable club staple, but the best thing about it is how everyone on it—Lil Wayne, Birdman, Mack Maine, Nicki Minaj and Detail—grabs the beat and puts their own individual stamp on it." David Jeffries of AllMusic stated, ""Tapout" is an all-star bit of flash that brings Future back to mix with the label's A-list."

XXL ranked it at number 18 on their list of the best songs of 2013. They commented saying, "Wayne kicks things off with a verse that, while not the most original, was still entertaining, while Birdman carries the bridge to the only part that really matters, and the only part that keeps this song on the list: Nicki Minaj. Here's to nominating "Pull up in that you can't afford this / Only rap bitch on the Forbes list" for couplet of the year. That and, of course, that hook is infectious as hell."

== Chart performance ==
The song has peaked at number 134 in France and at number 37 on the Belgium Bubbling Under Chart (Wallonia region), becoming Birdman's first entry in France and Mack Maine's first entry in those countries.

=== Weekly charts ===
Chart (2013)	Peak Position
Belgium (Ultratip Bubbling Under Wallonia)	37
France (SNEP)	134
US Billboard Hot 100	44
US Hot R&B/Hip-Hop Songs (Billboard)	10

=== Year-end charts ===
Chart (2013)	Position
US Hot R&B/Hip-Hop Songs (Billboard)	41
US Rap Songs (Billboard)	31

== Certifications ==
Region	Certification	Certified units/sales
United States (RIAA)	Gold	500,000^{‡}
^{‡} Sales+streaming figures based on certification alone.

== Release history ==
Region	Date	Format
United States	March 19, 2013	Digital download
United Kingdom	March 24, 2013	Digital download
France	March 25, 2013	Digital download
United States	May 7, 2013	Rhythmic contemporary radio
