= Sex, Drugs, & Hip-Hop =

Mixtape by Tony Yayo
- Released: July 30, 2012
- Genre: Hip hop; East Coast hip hop
- Length: 29:44
- Label: G-Unit

Tony Yayo chronology
El Chapo 2 (2012)	Sex, Drugs, & Hip-Hop (2012)	Godfather Of The Ghetto (2013)

Sex, Drugs, & Hip-Hop is a mixtape by rapper Tony Yayo. The mixtape features exclusive tracks from Tony Yayo with appearances by Bun B, Ron Browz, Slim Thug, Coolio, Lloyd Banks, Danny Brown and others. It was released for digital download on July 30, 2012, on DatPiff.

== Track list ==
No.	Title	Length
1.	"Make It Snow" (featuring Bun B, Slim Thug, Mr. Porter)	2:47
2.	"All These Bitches"	2:18
3.	"2 Girls" (featuring Gucci Mane)	2:46
4.	"Pissy"	2:11
5.	"100 bottles"	2:42
6.	"Tables" (featuring Cory Gunz, Danny Brown)	2:45
7.	"Throwing Money" (featuring Ron Browz)	2:43
8.	"Cemetary"	2:06
9.	"Slow and Melodic"	3:24
10.	"Break A Bitch" (featuring Too Short)	2:54
11.	"So High"	3:03
Total length:		29:44
