= Gudda Gudda =

American rapper from Louisiana

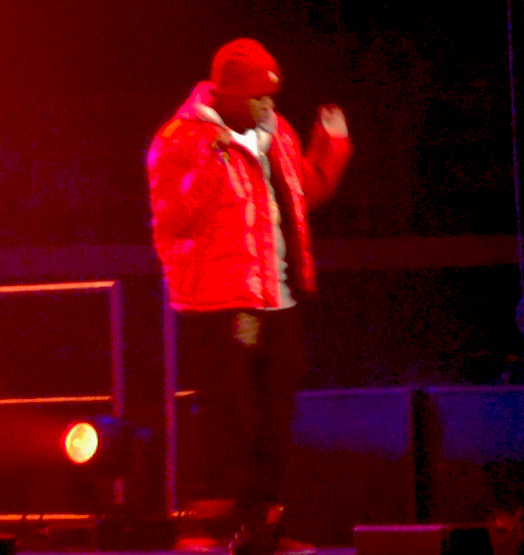
- Gudda Gudda performing at a concert at the General Motors Place in 2010

Background information
- Also known as: Gudda
- Born: Carl Eugene Lilly Jr. March 11, 1983 (age 43); San Jose, California, U.S.
- Origin: New Orleans, Louisiana, U.S.
- Genre: Southern hip-hop
- Occupations: Rapper; songwriter
- Years active: 2002–present
- Labels: Young Money; Republic
- Member of: Sqad Up; Young Money

Carl Eugene Lilly Jr. (born March 11, 1983), better known by his stage name Gudda Gudda, is an American rapper from New Orleans, Louisiana. He performed on Young Money Entertainment's 2009 single "BedRock", which peaked at number two on the Billboard Hot 100.

Lilly was originally a member of Sqad Up with Kidd Kidd and Lil Wayne. After forging a long-time friendship with Wayne, Lilly signed with his label Young Money Entertainment, and later Republic Records.

== Biography ==
=== 1983–2003: Early life and career ===
Gudda was born Carl Lilly on March 11, 1983, in San Jose. When he was still a child, his family moved to New Orleans. He grew up in the 9th Ward, where he met and befriended Lil Wayne during a dice game. This was much before he had ever thought of rapping as a career. As Wayne began to rap, Wayne would mentor him, and write Gudda's first song. Together they formed the group Sqad Up with rappers Dizzy and Kidd Kidd. Throughout 2002 and 2003, Gudda was featured on the seven mixtapes that Sqad Up released over the time period.

=== 2005–12: Guddaville series and collaborations ===
Gudda Gudda would be one of the first artists signed to Wayne's Young Money Entertainment upon its official founding in 2005. Gudda had been present the day Wayne had come up with the idea for Young Money. A short time later, Gudda signed a deal with Cash Money Records and Republic Records. On May 26, 2009, Gudda released Certified a collaboration album with fellow rapper Lil Flip on Real Talk Entertainment. The album was met with generally positive reviews. On September 28, 2009, Gudda released his first official solo mixtape Guddaville, which featured guest appearances from Lil Wayne, Drake, Tyga, Lil Twist, Nicki Minaj, Jae Millz, Shanell, Mack Maine, Lil Flip, Tity Boi, Bow Wow, and Ya Boy among others. He described the mixtapes theme to MTV saying, "I'm taking people on a walk through my eyes. Every time you heard me been a group project. Guddaville is just me expressing how I feel about a lot of different things, taking you in my world."

Gudda was featured on Birdman's album Pricele$$ on the track "Hustle" and prominently featured on the Young Money group album We Are Young Money being featured on eight tracks, including the singles "Every Girl" and "BedRock." Both singles were hits, each peaking in the top ten of the Billboard Hot 100. He was also featured on the track "I Don't Like the Look of It" on Lil Wayne's album I Am Not a Human Being. On June 7, 2010, Gudda released the sequel to his first mixtape titled, Back 2 Guddaville. His second official mixtape featured guest appearances from Waka Flocka Flame, Mack Maine, Jay Rock, Lil Wayne, Vado, Ya Boy and Jae Millz, among others.

Then for two years Gudda remained quiet recording music without releasing hardly any music. He was featured on the remix to "I'm On" along with Big K.R.I.T., Jadakiss, J. Cole, Kendrick Lamar, B.o.B, Tyga, and Bun B. On November 5, 2012, Gudda released the tracklist to his third official mixtape Guddaville 3. The tracklist revealed guest appearances from Wiz Khalifa, 2 Chainz, Lil Wayne, Mystikal, Crooked I, Trae tha Truth, Ace Hood, Future, Jae Millz, Birdman, Kevin Gates, Tyga, and Mack Maine. Two days later on November 7, 2012, Gudda released Guddaville 3. Around the time he formed the group Loyalty Amongst Thieves, featuring Kevin Gates, Flow and T-Streets, which he said planned to release a self-titled mixtape.

=== 2013–present: Redrum and Guddaville: The Album ===
On March 11, 2013, Gudda released his fourth official mixtape Redrum. The mixtape featured guest appearances from Busta Rhymes, Jae Millz, Cory Gunz, Boo, and Charlie Rock among others. Production was handled by Cardiak, Young Chop, I.N.F.O., and Jahlil Beats among others. The mixtape was mainly a compilation of songs that did not make the final tracklist of Guddaville 3. Following its release, Gudda announced in an interview that he was working on his debut studio album Guddaville: The Album, later confirmed for release in 2014. He also said that he would release another mixtape Guddaville 4 prior to the album's release. Additionally he revealed he was starting his own production company Gudda Music and the Loyalty Amongst Thieves mixtape had already been completed.

Billboard praised his verse on Lil Wayne's I Am Not a Human Being II track "Gunwalk" as "show stealing". Gudda and Mack Maine would be the only rappers to be featured on The H a mixtape by Rick Ross and Birdman. He was also featured on two tracks on the 2013 YMCMB compilation album Rich Gang, including "Panties To The Side" with Bow Wow, French Montana and Tyga. He confirmed guest appearances on Guddaville: The Album to come from Lil Wayne, Busta Rhymes, and Drake, while also saying his dream collaborations would be with Kool G Rap or Dr. Dre. On March 11, 2014, Young Money released their second compilation album Young Money: Rise of an Empire, where Gudda was featured on two songs, "Fresher Than Ever" and "You Already Know". L.A.T (Loyalty Amongst Thieves) will be released in July 2014.

== Personal life ==
As of early 2013, Gudda Gudda was living in Houston, Texas and Cash Money Records headquarters Miami, Florida. He indicated most of his time was spent in the studio, with the rest of his time going towards being with his children.

== Discography ==
=== Collaboration albums ===
List of collaboration studio albums, with selected chart positions
Title	Album details
Certified (with Lil' Flip)	Released: May 26, 2009; Label: Real Talk Entertainment; Formats: CD, digital download

=== Compilation albums ===
List of compilation albums, with selected chart positions
Title	Album details	Peak chart positions					
Title	Album details	US	US R&B /HH	US Rap	CAN	UK	UK R&B
We Are Young Money	Released: December 21, 2009 (US); Label: Young Money, Cash Money, Universal Republic; Formats: CD, digital download	9	3	1	—	—	—
Rich Gang	Released: July 23, 2013 (US); Label: Young Money, Cash Money, Republic; Formats: CD, digital download	9	2	2	—	—	23
Young Money: Rise of an Empire	Released: March 11, 2014 (US); Label: Young Money, Cash Money, Republic; Formats: CD, digital download	7	4	3	24	148	18

=== Mixtapes ===
List of mixtapes, with selected details
Title	Mixtape details
Guddaville	Released: February 9, 2009; Format: Digital download; Label: YMCMB
Be-4 Tha Deal - Next Up	Released: January 1, 2010; Format: Digital download; Label: YMCMB
Back 2 Guddaville	Released: June 7, 2010; Format: Digital download; Label: YMCMB
Gudda Grindin (with Lil Wayne & Tyga)	Released: April 6, 2012; Format: Digital download; Label: YMCMB
Guddaville 3	Released: November 7, 2012; Format: Digital download; Label: YMCMB
Redrum	Released: March 11, 2013; Format: Digital download; Label: YMCMB
7 Slugs	Released: January 4, 2021; Format: Digital download; Label: YMCMB
Nina	Released: March 11, 2021; Format: Digital download; Label: YMCMB
Guddaville 4	Released: TBA; Format: Digital download; Label: YMCMB
Loyalty Amongst Thieves (with L.A.T.)	Released: TBA; Format: Digital download; Label: YMCMB

=== Singles ===
==== As lead artist ====
List of singles, with selected chart positions
Title	Year	Peak chart positions							Certifications	Album
Title	Year	US	US R&B	US Rap	CAN	IRE	NZ	UK	Certifications	Album
"Every Girl" (with Young Money)	2009	10	2	2	—	—	—	—	RIAA: Gold	We Are Young Money
"BedRock" (with Young Money featuring Lloyd)	2009	2	2	1	12	17	21	9	RIAA: 3× Platinum; BPI: Platinum	We Are Young Money
"—" denotes a title that did not chart, or was not released in that territory.

==== Promotional singles ====
List of singles, with selected chart positions, showing year released and album name
Title	Year	Peak chart positions	Album
Title	Year	US	Album
"Fuck Today" (Lil Wayne featuring Gudda Gudda)	2010	76	Non-album single
"—" denotes a title that did not chart, or was not released in that territory.

=== Other charted songs ===
Year	Title	Peak chart positions		Album
Year	Title	US	US R&B /HH	Album
2009	"Pass the Dutch" (featuring Short Dawg)	—	119	We Are Young Money
2009	"Gooder"	109	—	We Are Young Money
2013	"Gunwalk" (Lil Wayne featuring Gudda Gudda)	—	49	I Am Not a Human Being II
"—" denotes releases that did not chart.

=== Guest appearances ===
List of guest appearances, with other performing artists, showing year released and album name
Title	Year	Other performer(s)	Album
"What You Know Bout The South"	2006	Lil' Flip	Connected
"Dedication 3"	2008	Lil Wayne, Willie the Kid, Mack Maine	Dedication 3
"Bang Bang"	2008	Lil Wayne, Jae Millz	Dedication 3
"The Other Side"	2008	Lil Wayne, La the Darkman, Jae Millz	Dedication 3
"She's a Ryder"	2008	Lil Wayne	Dedication 3
"Magic"	2008	Lil Wayne	Dedication 3
"Whoever You Like"	2008	Lil Wayne, Jae Millz	Dedication 3
"Get Bizzy"	2008	Lil Wayne	Dedication 3
"Put On for the Game"| Lil Wayne, Tyga	2008		Dedication 3
"Where You From ?"	2008	Lil' Flip, Young Noble	All Eyez on Us
"Five-o"	2009	Nicki Minaj, Jae Millz	Beam Me Up Scotty
"Skit #1"	2009	Lil Wayne	No Ceilings
"Break Up"	2009	Lil Wayne, Short Dawg	No Ceilings
"Hustle"	2009	Birdman, Lil Wayne	Priceless
"The Dungeon"	2009	Lil' Twist, Jae Millz, Tyga	Class President
"Unh"	2009	Lil' Twist	Class President
"Smell It on Me"	2010	Yukmouth, 2 Chainz, D-Golder	Free at Last
"Run 4 Mayor"	2010	Jae Millz, Tyga	The Flood Warning
"Mirror"	2010	Tyga	Well Done
"My Reality"	2010	Mack Maine, Lil Wayne	The Laxative
"Bathroom"	2010	Kid Ink	Crash Landing
"Between Me And U"	2010	2 Chainz, Lil Keke	Trap-A-Velli 2: The Residue
"Players Club"	2010	Jae Millz, 2 Chainz	The Virgo Part 2: He Still Nasty
"YM Banger"	2010	Lil Wayne, Jae Millz, Tyga	I Am Not a Human Being
"YM Salute"	2010	Lil Wayne, Lil Twist, Lil Chuckee, Jae Millz, Nicki Minaj	I Am Not a Human Being
"I Don't Like the Look of It"	2010	Lil Wayne	I Am Not a Human Being
"Bricksquad"	2010	Waka Flocka Flame	Flockaveli
"Throwed Off"	2011	Lil Wayne	Sorry 4 the Wait
"I'm A Groupie"	2011	French Montana	Mister 16: Casino Life
"My Homies Still" (Remix)	2013	Young Jeezy, Jae Millz	Dedication 4
"Grateful"	2016	Lil Wayne	Non-album single
"Loyalty"	2017	Lil Wayne, Hoodybaby	In Tune We Trust
"Boyz 2 Menace"	2017	Lil Wayne	Dedication 6
"New Freezer"	2017	Lil Wayne	Dedication 6
"Gumbo"	2017	Lil Wayne	Dedication 6
"Questi palazzi"	2019	Mondo Marcio	Uomo!

== Awards and nominations ==
=== BET Awards ===
The BET Awards were established in 2001 by the Black Entertainment Television (BET) network to celebrate African Americans and other minorities in music, acting, sports and other fields of entertainment. The awards are presented annually and broadcasts live on BET.

Year	Nominee / work	Award	Result
2010	Young Money	Best New Artist	Nominated
2010	Young Money	Best Group	Won
2010	"BedRock" (Young Money featuring Lloyd)	Viewer's Choice	Nominated
2014	Young Money	Best Group	Won
