= Cory Gunz =

American rapper (born 1987)

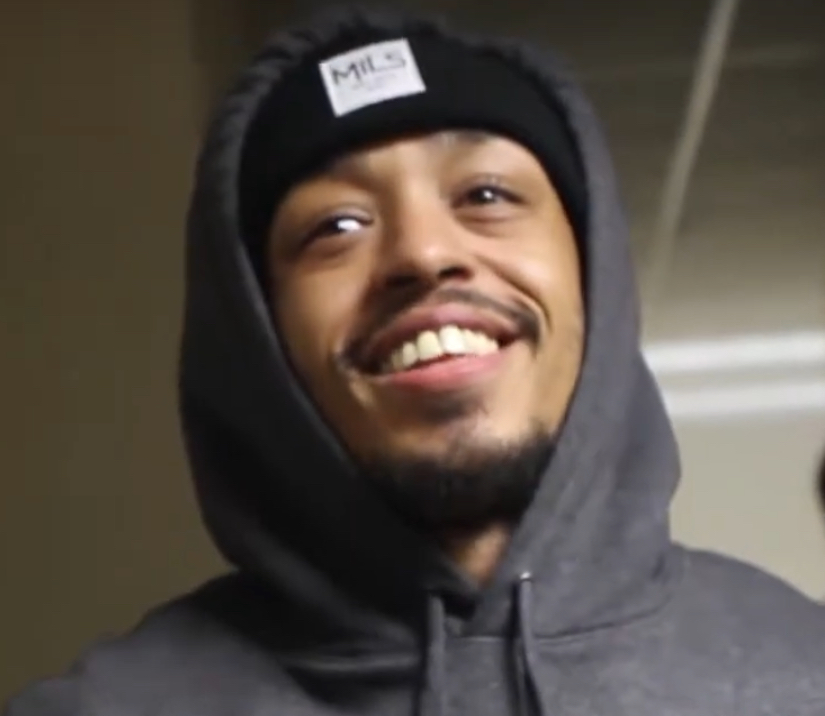
- Cory Gunz in 2016

Background information
- Also known as: Corey Gunz
- Born: Peter Cory Pankey, Jr. June 22, 1987 (age 39); The Bronx, New York City, U.S.
- Genre: East Coast hip-hop
- Occupations: Rapper; songwriter
- Years active: 2003–present
- Labels: 300; Sparta; Militia; Young Money; Cash Money; Republic; Universal Motown; After Platinum; Def Jam; Casablanca
- Children: 2
- Father: Peter Gunz

Peter Cory Pankey, Jr. (born June 22, 1987), better known by his stage name Cory Gunz, is an American rapper from the Bronx, New York City. He is best known for his guest appearance on Lil Wayne's 2010 single "6 Foot 7 Foot," which peaked at number nine on the Billboard Hot 100. He signed with Wayne's Young Money Entertainment, a then-imprint of Cash Money and Universal Republic Records in August of that year, although he has released no major solo albums with the label. He starred and was the subject of the 2011 documentary series Son of a Gun, which was presented by his mentor, American comedian Nick Cannon.

== Career ==
At age 14, Pankey was first signed by Tommy Mottola to Casablanca Records and Def Jam Recordings. Jay-Z shepherded him into a joint venture through The Island Def Jam Music Group. He was featured on a remix of Rihanna's single "If It's Lovin' That You Want". He mixtape The Apprentice 3 – Season Finale has amassed over 85,000 listens on the mixtape website DatPiff. He also contributed a verse to the original version of Lil Wayne's "A Milli" before it was replaced with new verses by Wayne for the album version.

In 2009, Pankey signed a contract with After Platinum Records. In early 2010, he signed with Young Money Entertainment and Universal Motown. He has worked with actor and musician Nick Cannon. In 2011, he was featured on Lil Wayne's single "6 Foot 7 Foot" from Tha Carter IV. Also in 2011, Pankey starred on MTV's "Son of A Gun" a reality show that follows he after and before he got signed by Young Money. The show features appearances from close friend Nick Cannon. It was announced that Universal Republic Records was going defunct, all of the artists on the roster moved from the label including (Cory Gunz) was being moved to Republic Records making the label itself revived. Pankey was a featured artist on Dirti Diana's 2013 mixtape R.I.P. To The Competition. On July 16, 2013, he released his first mixtape in two years with Datz WTF I'm Talkin Bout, it featured guest appearances by Busta Rhymes, Charlie Rock, Mack Maine, Wiz Khalifa, and Juicy J among others. In March 2014, Pankey revealed he was working on an EP titled Kriminal Mind and following its release he would release his debut studio album.

== Legal issues ==
On January 28, 2012, Pankey was arrested for possession of a gun and faced three and a half years in prison, which was lowered to a 2 1/2-year sentence. His father, Peter Pankey admitted that he had encouraged his son to keep a low profile and stop releasing music for a while in the aftermath of his arrest. In an interview from December 17, 2013, Peter Gunz stated that Pankey was trying to work on new records in Miami while on probation.

== Personal life ==
Pankey is the father of twin daughters.

== Discography ==
=== Extended plays ===
Cory Gunz extended plays and details
Title	Extended plays details
Gunz x Bars (with David Bars)	Released: December 16, 2022; Label: Militia Music
Loosie Pack	Released: September 16, 2023; Label: Militia Music
Loosie Pack 2	Released: November 22, 2023; Label: Militia Music

=== Compilation albums ===
List of compilation albums, with selected chart positions
Collaborator	Album details	Peak chart positions		
Collaborator	Album details	US	US R&B	US Rap
Rich Gang (with YMCMB)	Released: July 23, 2013; Label: Young Money, Cash Money, Republic; Format: CD, digital download	9	2	2
Young Money: Rise of an Empire (with Young Money)	Released: March 11, 2014; Label: Young Money, Cash Money, Republic; Format: CD, digital download	7	4	2
"—" denotes releases that did not chart or receive certification.

=== Mixtapes ===
Cory Gunz mixtapes and details
Title	Mixtape details
The Apprentice Mixtape Vol. 1	Released: December 17, 2005; Label: Self-released
The Apprentice Mixtape Vol. 2	Released: December 23, 2005; Label: Self-released
The Apprentice 3 – Season Finale	Released: January 30, 2006; Label: Self-released
The Militia: The Call of Duty	Released: August 18, 2006; Label: Self-released
The Best Kept Secret	Released: September 21, 2008; Label: Militia Music, 420recordings
Heir to the Throne	Released: September 22, 2009; Hosted by DJ Drama and Head Debiase; Label: Gangsta Grillz, After Platinum Records, Intent To Deliver
Youngest In Charge (with Square Off)	Released: March 6, 2010; Label: Self-released
Son of a Gun	Released: July 6, 2011; Hosted by DJ Ill Will and DJ Rockstar; Label: Militia Music, Young Money
Datz WTF I'm Talkin' Bout	Released: July 16, 2013; Label: After Platinum, YMCMB
Loosie Pack 3	Released: June 11, 2024; Label: Militia Music
The Militia	Released: July 6, 2024; Label: Militia Music

=== Singles ===
==== As a featured artist ====
List of singles, with selected chart positions and certifications, showing year released and album name
Title	Year	Peak chart positions					Certifications	Album
Title	Year	US	US R&B/ Hip Hop	US Rap	CAN	UK	Certifications	Album
"Dirty Girl" (Aaron Fresh featuring Cory Gunz)	2010	—	—	—	—	—		A. Fresh Start
"6 Foot 7 Foot" (Lil Wayne featuring Cory Gunz)	2010	9	2	2	50	71	RIAA: 7× Platinum; BPI: Silver	Tha Carter IV
"Slime Father" (N.O.R.E. featuring Cory Gunz)	2011	—	—	—	—	—		non-album singles
"Great Spitters" (Prodigy featuring Cory Gunz)	2012	—	—	—	—	—		non-album singles
"On This Side" (Dirti Diana featuring King Los, Cory Gunz and Phresh Duzit)	2013	—	—	—	—	—		R.I.P. To The Competition
"Pyrex" (Lil Twist featuring Cory Gunz)	2014	—	—	—	—	—		The Golden Child 2
"—" denotes releases that did not chart or were not released in that territory.

=== Guest appearances ===
List of non-single guest appearances, with other performing artists, showing year released and album name
Title	Year	Other artist(s)	Album
"If It's Lovin' that You Want (Part 2)"	2006	Rihanna	A Girl like Me
"Pocket or Two"	2008	Bravehearts, D-Stres	Bravehearted 2
"Push It"	2008	Emina Jahović	Exhale
"A New Day"	2008	Willie the Kid, Marvo	Absolute Greatness
"A Million Lights"	2011	DJ Khaled, Kevin Rudolf, Tyga, Mack Maine, Jae Millz	We the Best Forever
"Crazy Glue"	2011	Smoke DZA, Big Sant	Jet World Order
"Loko"	2012	Mysonne, Lumidee	The Definition of a G 2
"I Don't Care"	2012	Fred the Godson	Gordo Frederico
"Same Ol' Story"	2012	DJ Drama, Kid Ink, Schoolboy Q, Childish Gambino	Quality Street Music
"Up Every Night (Remix)"	2012	1982, Kid Ink	—N/a
"Come On"	2012	Trav	Push
"Tables"	2012	Tony Yayo, Danny Brown	Sex, Drugs, & Hip-Hop
"Ghetto Symphony"	2013	Mack Maine, Flow, P.A.P.I.	Freestyle 102: No Pens or Pads
"What You Talkin' Bout"	2013	Gudda Gudda	REDRUM
"Lay It Down"	2013	Lil Wayne, Nicki Minaj	I Am Not a Human Being II
"Up Every Night" (Remix)	2013	Termanology, Kid Ink	Hood Politics 7
"Monsta"	2013	Antwon Bailey, Jadakiss	Now or Never
"Everyday"	2013	Birdman, Mystikal, Busta Rhymes	Rich Gang
"Right Now"	2013	Meek Mill, French Montana, Mase	Dreamchasers 3
"NY Fitted"	2013	Torch, Sinsay, Fred the Godson	Da Bronx Zoo
"Chasing Paper"	2014	Pyro Prada	—N/a
"Buss Ya Mic"	2014	DJ Kay Slay, Jon Connor, Dave East	The Last Hip Hop Disciple
"Murda"	2015	Lil Wayne, Capo, Junior Reid	Free Weezy Album
"50 Shots"	2015	Method Man, Streetlife, Mack Wilds	The Meth Lab
"Spit Game Proper"	2016	DJ Kay Slay, Termanology, Loaded Lux	Cameo King III
"Let Em All In"	2017	Lil Wayne, Euro	Dedication 6

== Filmography ==
Television
Year	Title	Role	Notes
2011	Son of a Gun	Himself	Main Role
2013	Love & Hip Hop	Himself	Cameo/Support Role
