= Kane Beatz =

American record producer (born 1986)

- Born: Daniel Andrew Johnson; December 20, 1986 (age 39); Miami, Florida, U.S.
- Origin: Orlando, Florida, U.S. Atlanta, Georgia, U.S.
- Genres: Hip hop; pop; R&B
- Occupations: Record producer; songwriter
- Instruments: FL Studio; Pro Tools; Roland Fantom-X; Yamaha Motif; Korg Triton
- Years active: 2003–present
- Labels: The Building; Artist Publishing Group; Atlantic Records

Daniel Andrew Johnson (born December 20, 1986), professionally known as Kane Beatz, is an American record producer and songwriter from Orlando, Florida.

== Life and career ==
Johnson's first success as a music producer came while he was still in high school selling his beats on the internet. Working with artists such as Micah T from Invasion Productions, he was soon contacted by Mike Caren, Executive Vice President of A&R for Atlantic Records, who signed him to a publishing contract with the label.

Since then, Kane founded his own label called The Building. The first artist signed was The Mad Violinist. Since then he signed songwriter Kief Brown and producer Jeremy "JMIKE" Coleman, who signed in a joint venture with Dr. Luke's Prescription Songs.

== Artistry ==
=== Musical style ===
Johnson tags most of his beats with a robotic male voice saying, "Kane is in the building, n***a."

=== Influences ===
He has stated that his favorite producers and largest musical influences are Timbaland, Dr. Dre, and Mannie Fresh.

== Production discography ==
=== Singles produced ===
List of singles, with selected chart positions and certifications, showing year released and album name
Title	Year	Peak chart positions					Certifications	Album
Title	Year	US	US R&B	US Rap	AUS	UK	Certifications	Album
"Tuck Ya Ice" (Trick Daddy featuring Birdman)	2006	—	90	—	—	—		Back by Thug Demand
"BedRock" (Young Money featuring Lloyd)	2009	2	2	1	—	9	RIAA: 7× Platinum	We Are Young Money
"Steady Mobbin" (Lil Wayne featuring Gucci Mane)	2009	48	—	6	—	—		We Are Young Money
"Reverse Cowgirl" (T-Pain)	2010	75	64	—	79	—		revover
"Loyalty" (Birdman featuring Lil Wayne and Tyga)	2010	107	61	25	—	—		Bigga Than Life
"Bottoms Up" (Trey Songz featuring Nicki Minaj)	2010	6	2	—	74	71	RIAA: 4× Platinum	Passion, Pain & Pleasure
"Right Above It" (Lil Wayne featuring Drake)	2010	6	4	1	98	37	RIAA: 4× Platinum	I Am Not a Human Being
"The Show Goes On" (Lupe Fiasco)	2010	9	45	4	5	49	ARIA: 2× Platinum; RIAA: 3× Platinum	Lasers
"Super Bass" (Nicki Minaj)	2011	3	6	3	6	10	ARIA: 6× Platinum; RIAA: Diamond	Pink Friday
"Good Good Night" (Roscoe Dash)	2011	91	44	21	—	—		J.U.I.C.E.
"We in This Bitch" (DJ Drama featuring Future, Young Jeezy, T.I. and Ludacris)	2012	—	68	—	—	—		Quality Street Music
"Bed of Lies" (Nicki Minaj featuring Skylar Grey)	2014	62	—	—	—	—		The Pinkprint
"—" denotes a recording that did not chart or was not released in that territory.
