= Mack Maine =

American record executive (born 1982)

- Born: Jermaine Anthony Preyan; July 28, 1982 (age 44)
- Origin: New Orleans, Louisiana, U.S.
- Genre: Southern hip-hop
- Occupations: Record executive; songwriter; rapper
- Years active: 2003–present
- Labels: Soothe Your Soul; Republic; Young Money; Cash Money; Universal Motown

Jermaine Anthony Preyan (born July 28, 1982), better known by his stage name Mack Maine, is an American record executive, songwriter, and rapper from New Orleans, Louisiana. A longtime collaborator of fellow New Orleans-rapper Lil Wayne, Preyan has served as president of Young Money Entertainment since 2009 and has co-written several of Wayne's singles — including "How to Love", "Got Money", "No Worries" and "It's Good", among others.

As a recording artist, Preyan performed on Young Money's 2009 single "Every Girl" and Rich Gang's 2013 single "Tapout", which peaked at numbers 10 and 44 on the Billboard Hot 100, respectively. He released two compilation albums with the former—We Are Young Money (2009) and Young Money: Rise of an Empire (2014)—and one with the latter—Rich Gang (2013). His 2009 debut single, "Throw It Back" (featuring Lil Wayne), failed to chart. His guest appearance on Wayne's 2018 song "Start This Shit Off Right" remains his sole entry on the chart as a recording act. He founded his own record label, Soothe Your Soul Records in 2008.

Preyan has also co-written severally for other artists or Wayne's collaborators, often in tandem with record producer Ke'noe; his credits include "Dreams and Nightmares" by Meek Mill and "So Sophisticated" by Rick Ross.

== Early life ==
Jermaine Anthony Preyan was born in New Orleans, Louisiana. He formed a friendship with Lil Wayne at the age of eleven. He and Lil Wayne, along with rapper Curren$y and Cortez Bryant attended Eleanor McMain Secondary School.

== Career ==
In 2003, he placed 16th out of a thousand contestants in a freestyle battle hosted by MTV; this, combined with a backstage performance at the 2004 BET Awards with Cassidy, led him to becoming a founding member of Young Money Entertainment with Lil Wayne in 2005. In 2008, Mack Maine appeared on the official remix of Lil Wayne's third single from Tha Carter III, "Got Money," and performed the song with Wayne on Saturday Night Live on September 14. At the 2008 Ozone Awards, he won the "Patiently Waiting: Louisiana" award.

In 2009, he performed with Lil Wayne on his "I Am Music" tour, performing every night in his own set, as well as mtvU's Spring Break 2009 concert. He also released a mixtape presented by Don Cannon entitled This Is Just a Mixtape, featuring appearances from Lil Wayne, Mistah Fab, Gorilla Zoe, Pleasure P, Rick Ross, Mystikal, and Soulja Slim. Mack Maine appears on the Young Money collaboration album, including the first single, "Every Girl". Along with Birdman, Slim, Cortez Bryant, and other past and present Cash Money artists, he starred in Lil Wayne's Behind the Music episode, which premiered September 11, 2009.

In March 2010, Mack Maine appeared with Snoop Dogg on T-Pain's single, "Ghetto Commandments." He also voiced one of Trap Jesus' gangsters in the Adult Swim special Freaknik: The Musical. Maine was also featured on the music video of Playaz Circle's Hit song with Lil Wayne, "Duffle Bag Boy". On March 17, 2013 Mack Maine released the music video for "Celebrate" featuring Lil Wayne and Talib Kweli.

As of 2020, he’s executive produced Funeral and also is the booker for Wayne’s new show on Apple Music, Young Money Radio.

== Legal issues ==
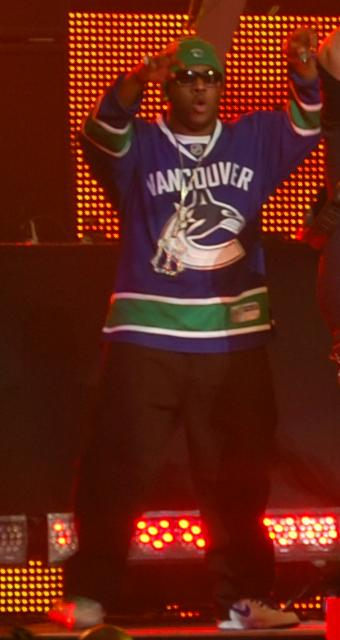
Preyan performing in 2009

In 2014, Mack expanded his role and joined Lil Wayne’s management team. With that move his goal was to immediately expand Wayne’s business portfolio. First deal he helped close was Wayne’s partnership with Bumbu. The next deal he brought to the table was Wayne’s sports agency, Young Money APAA sports.

In 2018, a settlement was reached in which Wayne would be able to release music accordingly. Mack executive produced Tha Carter V and continued to add to the portfolio by securing an American Eagle collab and a partnership with cannabis brand GKUA.

== Discography ==
=== Compilation albums ===
List of compilation albums, with selected chart positions
Title	Album details	Peak chart positions		
Title	Album details	US	US R&B	US Rap
We Are Young Money	Released: December 21, 2009 (US); Label: Young Money, Cash Money, Universal Republic; Formats: CD, digital download	9	3	1
Rich Gang	Released: July 23, 2013 (US); Label: Young Money, Cash Money, Republic; Formats: CD, digital download	9	2	2
Young Money: Rise of an Empire	Released: March 11, 2014 (US); Label: Young Money, Cash Money, Republic; Formats: CD, digital download	7	4	2

=== Mixtapes ===
- 2006: Young Money, Vol. 1 (with Lil' Wayne, Curren$y, & Boo)
- 2006: G-Series (with Curren$y)
- 2008: Mack Maine BOBO 101
- 2008: B!tch, I'm Mack Maine (Freestyle 102)
- 2009: DJ Don Cannon Presents: This is Just a Mixtape
- 2010: DJ Rockstar Presents: The Laxative
- 2011: Billionaire Minds (with Birdman)
- 2012: Don’t Let It Go Waste
- 2013: Freestyle 102: No Pens or Pads
- 2013: Food for Thought

== Miscellaneous ==
List of miscellaneous albums, with selected information
Title	Album details	Notes
Maine 4 President	Released: Unknown; Label: Soothe Your Soul, Young Money, Cash Money, Republic	

=== Singles ===
==== As lead artist ====
List of singles, with selected chart positions, showing year released and album name
Title	Year	Peak chart positions			Album
Title	Year	US	US R&B/HH	US Rap	Album
"Throw It Back" (featuring Lil Wayne)	2009	—	—	—	Maine 4 President
"Every Girl" (with Young Money)	2009	10	2	2	We are Young Money
"All in One Swipe" (featuring Rick Ross and Birdman)	2010	—	—	—	Maine 4 President/Bigga Than Life
"Celebrate" (featuring Lil Wayne and Talib Kweli)	2013	—	—	—	Maine 4 President
"—" denotes a recording that did not chart.

==== As featured artist ====
List of singles as featured artist, with selected chart positions, showing year released and album name
Title	Year	Peak chart positions			Certifications	Album
Title	Year	US	US R&B/HH	US Rap	Certifications	Album
"I Get Money" (Birdman featuring Lil Wayne, Mack Maine and T-Pain)	2011	—	—	—		Non-album singles
"B-Boyz" (Birdman featuring Mack Maine, Kendrick Lamar, Ace Hood and DJ Khaled)	2012	—	—	—		Non-album singles
"Dark Shades" (Birdman featuring Lil Wayne and Mack Maine)	2012	—	—	—		Non-album singles
"Tapout" (Rich Gang featuring Birdman, Lil Wayne, Nicki Minaj, Future and Mack Maine)	2013	44	10	8	RIAA: Gold	Rich Gang
"—" denotes a recording that did not chart.

=== Guest appearances ===
List of non-single guest appearances, with other performing artists, showing year released and album name
Title	Year	Other artist(s)	Album
"Shovlin' Snow"	2005	Birdman, Currensy, Lil Wayne	Fast Money
"Poppin them Bottles"	2006	Currensy, Lil Wayne	Dedication 2
"Ridin wit the AK"	2006	Currensy, Lil Wayne	Dedication 2
"I Know The Future"	2007	Lil Wayne	The Drought Is Over 2 (The Carter 3 Sessions)
"Zoo"	2007	Lil Wayne	The Drought Is Over 2 (The Carter 3 Sessions)
"Dedication 3"	2008	Lil Wayne, Gudda Gudda, Willie the Kid	Dedication 3
"Written on Her" (Remix)	2009	Birdman, Jay Sean, Flo Rida	Priceless
"A Million Lights"	2011	DJ Khaled, Kevin Rudolf, Tyga, Jae Millz, Cory Gunz	We the Best Forever
"As Da World Turns"	2012	Gudda Gudda, Lil Wayne	Guddaville 3
"Don't Pay 4 It"	2012	DJ Khaled, Wale, Tyga, Kirko Bangz	Kiss the Ring
"Money to Make"	2013	Birdman, Rick Ross	The H
"Feelat"	2013	Cory Gunz	Datz WTF I'm Talkin Bout

== Awards and nominations ==
=== BET Awards ===
The BET Awards were established in 2001 by the Black Entertainment Television (BET) network to celebrate African Americans and other minorities in music, acting, sports and other fields of entertainment. The awards are presented annually and broadcasts live on BET.

Year	Nominee / work	Award	Result
2010	Young Money	Best New Artist	Nominated
2010	Young Money	Best Group	Won
2010	"BedRock" (Young Money featuring Lloyd)	Viewer's Choice	Nominated
2014	Young Money	Best Group	Won
