= We Are Young Money =

Compilation album by Young Money
- Released: December 21, 2009
- Recorded: 2008–09 in Vancouver
- Genres: Hip hop; R&B
- Length: 65:12
- Labels: Young Money; Cash Money; Universal Motown
- Producers: Lil Wayne; Tha Bizness; Kane Beatz; Chase N. Cashe; Cool & Dre; B. Carr; David Banner; Angel "Onhel" Aponte; Infamous; Andrew "Pop" Wansel; Willy Will; Phenom; DJ Mecca of The Audibles; Mr. Pyro

Young Money chronology
Young Money: The Mixtape Vol. 1 (2005)	We Are Young Money (2009)	Rich Gang (2013)

Singles from We Are Young Money
- 1. "Every Girl" Released: June 11, 2009; 2. "BedRock" Released: November 14, 2009; 3. "Steady Mobbin" Released: January 26, 2010; 4. "Roger That" Released: March 23, 2010

We Are Young Money is the first compilation album by American hip hop record label Young Money Entertainment, released on December 21, 2009. The album garnered a positive reception but critics were divided on the quality of the label's choice of artists. We Are Young Money debuted at number 9 on the Billboard 200 and spawned four singles: "Every Girl", "BedRock", "Steady Mobbin" and "Roger That". The album was certified Platinum by the Recording Industry Association of America for sales of over 1,000,000 copies in the United States.

== Background ==
The album features contributions from Young Money artists Lil Wayne, Gudda Gudda, Jae Millz, Mack Maine, Drake, Tyga, T-Streets, Short Dawg, Shanell, Nicki Minaj, Lil Twist and Lil Chuckee. The album also features guest appearances from Birdman, Lloyd and Gucci Mane. The album's production was handled by Kane Beatz, Chase N. Cashe, Cool & Dre, David Banner, Infamous, Willy Will and DJ Mecca of the Audibles, among other high-profile record producers. Lil Wayne, the founder of the label, performs on all tracks except "Girl I Got You".

== Singles ==
"Every Girl" was released as the album's lead single on June 11, 2009; the song features Lil Wayne, Drake, Jae Millz, Gudda Gudda and Mack Maine. The song peaked at number 10 on the US Billboard Hot 100. "BedRock" was released as the album's second single on November 14, 2009; the song features Lil Wayne, Drake, Jae Millz, Gudda Gudda, Nicki Minaj, Tyga and Lloyd. The song has peaked at number 2 on the US Billboard Hot 100 chart, and number 9 on the UK Singles Chart, making it the most commercially successful single. The two first singles proved to be hits on the charts and in the urban community. "Steady Mobbin", featuring Gucci Mane, was released as the album's third single on January 26, 2010 and peaked at number 48 on the Billboard Hot 100 in the United States. "Roger That" was released as the album's fourth single; the song features Lil Wayne, Nicki Minaj and Tyga. It was officially released to urban radio on March 23, 2010.

== Critical reception ==
Professional ratings
Aggregate scores
Source	Rating
Metacritic	63/100
Review scores
Source	Rating
AllMusic	3.5/5 stars
The A.V. Club	C
HipHopDX	2.5/5 stars
NOW	3/5 Ns
Pitchfork	7.4/10
RapReviews	7/10
Rolling Stone	2.5/5 stars
Toronto Star	2/4 stars
XXL	3/5 stars

We Are Young Money received generally favorable reviews from music critics who found the quality of the rappers' talents below average. At Metacritic, which assigns a normalized rating out of 100 to reviews from mainstream critics, the album received an average score of 63, based on 8 reviews.

Steve 'Flash' Juon of RapReviews praised the production by Kane Beatz and Tha Bizness for providing the necessary energy but found the album filled with more Lil Wayne and less of his newly signed roster than needed, saying that "For the most part the charisma of Lil Wayne and Drake carries We Are Young Money even when the actual content does not. Occasionally Jae Millz or Mack Maine upstage everyone with a line or two but odds are if you buy We Are Young Money you're a Lil Wayne fan." Pitchfork writer Ryan Dombal said that Drake and Nicki Minaj elevate the material that contains high quality production, saying that "Along with its top tier talents, what keeps WAYM from slogging along is a stylistic diversity and a selection of beats that sometimes borders on phenomenal." XXL contributor Chris Yuscavage praised the album for allowing new rappers to deliver workmanlike lyrics that rarely happen in similar projects, saying that "We Are Young Money—the first group project from Lil Wayne's Young Money Entertainment—actually manages to help the YM roster make a solid first impression." Joshua Errett of NOW found Minaj the only standout rapper on the record because of her idiosyncratic delivery, saying that "Her nonsensical punchlines and train-wreck flow have been accurately described as Lynchian - kooky and captivating."

The A.V. Club's Nathan Rabin found the album's lyrical content and roster of rappers tiring and lacking in staying power, concluding that "Money is pure bubblegum, the kind of instantly disposable pop ephemera listeners forget about while it's still playing." Kathy Iandoli of HipHopDX found the record too Wayne-heavy and doesn't give enough time for the new rappers to leave an impression, saying that "[T]he problem here is that unlike past posse introductory albums (see Wu-Tang Clan's Enter The 36 Chambers), there isn't a level playing field where everyone has an equal opportunity to become a star. The individual successes of Wayne, Drake, and Nicki alone make a compilation like this too late for them and too early for the rest." Christian Hoard of Rolling Stone felt the album lacked balance in showcasing new artists, saying that "It's inconsistent, veering from Drake (always solid, but distracted here) to very average MCs like Gudda Gudda." Ashante Infantry of the Toronto Star said that despite appearances from Drake and Nicki Minaj, the rest of the label roster proved mediocre in delivering verses, saying that "[I]t's difficult to establish identity in an ensemble cast and even tougher with the limited, profane agenda – money, groupies, cars – outlined in songs like 'Fuck Da Bullshit' and 'New Shit'."

== Commercial performance ==
We Are Young Money debuted at number 9 on the US Billboard 200 chart, selling 142,000 copies in its first-week sales. The album was certified Platinum by the Recording Industry Association of America (RIAA) for selling over 1 million copies in the United States.

== Track listing ==
No.	Title	Writer(s)	Performer(s)	Length
1.	"Gooder"	Dwayne Carter, Jr.; Jermaine Preyan; Carl Lilly, Jr.; Jarvis Mills; Andre Lyon; Marcello Valenzano	Lil Wayne; Mack Maine; Gudda Gudda; Jae Millz	4:26
2.	"Every Girl in the World"	Carter; Preyan; Lilly; Mills; Aubrey Graham; Justin Henderson; Christopher Whitacre	Lil Wayne; Mack Maine; Gudda Gudda; Jae Millz; Drake	5:13
3.	"Ms. Parker"	Carter; Preyan; Lilly; Henderson; Whitacre	Lil Wayne; Mack Maine; Gudda Gudda	5:19
4.	"Wife Beater"	Carter; Preyan; Mills; Carl Watts; Michael Stevenson; Daniel Johnson	Lil Wayne; Mack Maine; Jae Millz; T-Streets; Tyga	4:43
5.	"New Shit"	Carter; Preyan; Mills; Lilly; Brandon Carrier; Jesse Woodard	Lil Wayne; Mack Maine; Gudda Gudda; Jae Millz	3:31
6.	"Pass the Dutch" (featuring Short Dawg)	Carter; Lilly; Graham; Supreme Williams; Carrier; Woodard	Lil Wayne; Gudda Gudda; Drake	5:06
7.	"Play in My Band"	Carter; Shanell Woodgett; Patrick Callahan; William Hodge II	Lil Wayne; Shanell	4:08
8.	"Fuck da Bullshit" (featuring Birdman)	Carter; Lilly; Graham; Onika Maraj; Bryan Williams; Carrier; Woodard; Andrew Wansel	Lil Wayne; Gudda Gudda; Drake; Nicki Minaj	3:07
9.	"BedRock" (featuring Lloyd)	Carter; Lilly; Graham; Maraj; Mills; Stevenson; Lloyd Polite, Jr.; Johnson	Lil Wayne; Gudda Gudda; Drake; Nicki Minaj; Jae Millz; Tyga	4:48
10.	"Girl I Got You"	Christopher Moore; Rashad Ballard; Dominic Jordan; Dean Simmons; Janet Jackson; James Harris III; Terry Lewis	Lil Twist; Lil Chuckee	3:58
11.	"Steady Mobbin" (featuring Gucci Mane)	Carter; Radric Davis; Johnson	Lil Wayne	5:38
12.	"Roger That"	Carter; Maraj; Stevenson	Lil Wayne; Nicki Minaj; Tyga	3:30
13.	"She Is Gone"	Carter; Lilly; Mills; Watts; Johnson	Lil Wayne; Gudda Gudda; Jae Millz; T-Streets	3:50
14.	"Streets Is Watchin'"	Carter; Lilly; Mills; Watts; Maraj; Lavell Crump	Lil Wayne; Gudda Gudda; Jae Millz; T-Streets; Nicki Minaj	3:41
15.	"Finale"	Carter; Lilly; Mills; Watts; Maraj; Preyan; Graham; Stevenson; Woodgett; Moore; Ballard; Angel Aponte; Marco Rodriguez-Diaz	Lil Wayne; Gudda Gudda; Jae Millz; T-Streets; Nicki Minaj; Mack Maine; Drake; Tyga; Shanell; Lil Twist; Lil Chuckee	5:22
Total length:				65:12

Sample credits

- "Girl I Got You" contains a sample of "Escapade" as performed by Janet Jackson.

== Personnel ==
- Kane Beatz – production (4, 9, 11, 13)
- B. Carr – production (5, 6, 8)
- Chase N. Cashe – production (5, 6, 8)
- Tha Bizness – production (2, 3)
- Cool & Dre – production (1)
- Willy Will – production (7)
- Halo – production (7)
- Pop Wansel – production (8)
- DJ Mecca – production (10)
- Mr. Pyro – production (10)
- Phenom – production (12)
- David Banner – production (14)
- Infamous – production (15)
- OnHel – production (15)

== Charts ==
=== Weekly charts ===
Chart (2009–2010)	Peak position
US Billboard 200	9
US Top R&B/Hip-Hop Albums (Billboard)	3
US Top Rap Albums (Billboard)	1

=== Year-end charts ===
Chart (2010)	Position
US Billboard 200	46
US Top R&B/Hip-Hop Albums (Billboard)	14

== Certifications ==
Region	Certification	Certified units/sales
United States (RIAA)	Platinum	1,000,000^{‡}
^{‡} Sales+streaming figures based on certification alone.
