= Drop the World =

Single by Lil Wayne featuring Eminem

from the album Rebirth
- Released: December 28, 2009
- Recorded: September 2009
- Studio: Effigy Studios (Ferndale, Michigan)
- Genre: Hip hop; rap rock; electronic
- Length: 3:49
- Label: Young Money; Cash Money; Universal Motown
- Songwriters: Dwayne Carter, Jr.; Marshall Mathers; Luis Resto; Jesse Woodward; Mike Strange; Chauncey Hollis
- Producers: Hit-Boy; Chase N. Cashe; Travis Barker

Lil Wayne singles chronology
"Revolver" (2009)	"Drop the World" (2009)	"Steady Mobbin" (2010)

Eminem singles chronology
"Forever" (2009)	"Drop the World" (2009)	"Not Afraid" (2010)

Music video
- "Drop The World" on YouTube

"Drop the World" is a song by American rapper Lil Wayne featuring fellow American rapper Eminem. It was released on December 28, 2009 as the third single released from the former's seventh studio album Rebirth (2010).

The artists alongside Travis Barker of Blink-182 performed the song together along with Drake's song "Forever" at the 52nd Grammy Awards in 2010. On April 10, 2014, the single was certified quadruple platinum by the RIAA. Rapper Game and Kanary Diamonds made a remix of the song that appears on Game's mixtape The Red Room. Rapper Royce da 5'9" made a remix of the song entitled "Pick Ma Balls Up".

== Music video ==
The video for "Drop the World" was directed by Chris Robinson. It was shot on January 31, 2010, the same day as the 52nd Annual Grammy Awards, where Eminem and Lil Wayne performed together. The video showcases moshing, rioting, and Wayne skateboarding through a busy street in New York City. It was premiered on March 5, 2010, on MTV Hits. The main concept of the video centers around Lil Wayne and Eminem being in the midst of a massive riot. Cash Money Records label boss Birdman and rapper Lloyd Banks both make cameo appearances.

== Reception ==
Despite a generally negative reception for Rebirth, "Drop the World" received more positive reviews. "Drop the World" was arguably the most anticipated song from the album due to its guest feature from Eminem. In a review of the album, NME called the song the only highlight of Rebirth. The article discussed the meaning behind the song, noting that Lil Wayne simply avoids answering a question commonly asked by successful hip hop musicians: "How do you deal with 'real issues' when you've got enough money to buy your old neighborhood a hundred times over?" The magazine notes that, in the song, Lil Wayne avoids commenting on this question, and instead focuses his energy on "being so pissed off you have to get in a spaceship, pick the world up and drop it on some poor girl's 'fucking head.'" Ultimately, the article concludes the song only serves as a "what-could-have-been" demonstration for the album. Writing for Fairfax New Zealand's Stuff.co.nz website, Chris Schulz was less than impressed with "Drop the World", claiming that, even with Eminem, the song was unexceptional.

== Track listing ==
Digital download

No.	Title	Writer(s)	Producer(s)	Length
1.	"Drop the World"	Dwayne Carter, Jr.; Marshall Mathers; Luis Resto; Jesse Woodward; Mike Strange; Chauncey Hollis	Hit-Boy; Chase N. Cashe; Travis Barker	3:49

== Charts ==
=== Weekly charts ===
Weekly chart performance
Chart (2010)	Peak position
Australia (ARIA)	56
Canada (Canadian Hot 100)	24
Ireland (IRMA)	43
UK Singles (OCC)	51
UK R&B Chart (OCC)	19
US Billboard Hot 100	18

=== Year-end Charts ===
Annual chart rankings
Chart (2010)	Rank
US Digital Song Sales (Billboard)	68

== Certifications ==
Certifications and sales for "Drop the World"
Region	Certification	Certified units/sales
Australia (ARIA)	Platinum	70,000^{‡}
New Zealand (RMNZ)	Gold	7,500^{*}
United Kingdom (BPI)	Gold	400,000^{‡}
United States (RIAA)	5× Platinum	5,000,000^{‡}
^{*} Sales figures based on certification alone.^{‡} Sales+streaming figures based on certification alone.
