= Right Above It =

Single by Lil Wayne featuring Drake

from the album I Am Not a Human Being
- Released: August 17, 2010
- Recorded: 2010
- Genre: Hip hop
- Length: 4:35
- Label: Young Money; Cash Money; Universal Motown
- Songwriters: Dwayne Carter; Aubrey Graham; Daniel Johnson; Andrew Canton
- Producer: Kane Beatz

Lil Wayne singles chronology
"I'm Single" (2010)	"Right Above It" (2010)	"No Love" (2010)

Drake singles chronology
"Fancy" (2010)	"Right Above It" (2010)	"Aston Martin Music" (2010)

"Right Above It" is a hip hop song by American rapper Lil Wayne, released as the first single off his eighth studio album, I Am Not a Human Being (2010). The song features vocals from Canadian and Young Money rapper Drake, and is produced by American hip-hop producer Kane Beatz. The song is also written by rapper and producer Andrew Canton. The song achieved reasonable chart success, particularly in the United States where it peaked at number 6 on the Billboard Hot 100 and number one on the Hot Digital Songs chart, and also charted modestly internationally.

Upon its release, the song received generally positive reviews from critics, who complimented its confident, upbeat tone and the performances of both rappers, with many praising it as a highlight off the album. The song was later certified 5× platinum by the Recording Industry Association of America for sales of 5 million equivalent units.

The song serves as the opening theme for the HBO series Ballers, starring Dwayne Johnson.

== Background ==
Along with all of the other songs on I Am Not a Human Being, the song was recorded in 2010 prior to Wayne's nine-month prison term for criminal possession of a weapon. The song contains a vocal sample from the 2Pac song "Hail Mary": more specifically, it samples the line "I ain't a killer but don't push me".

The song premiered on August 3, 2010, on the New York urban contemporary radio station Hot 97. On the same evening, the show's host Funkmaster Flex conducted an interview with Lil Wayne from Rikers Island prison. While discussing I Am Not a Human Being, Lil Wayne announced that the song would be released as a single, although he did not announce a release date at the time. The single was officially digitally released in the United States on August 17, 2010.

A visualizer for the song was released on March 31, 2023.

== Live performances ==
On December 31, 2010, Lil Wayne performed the song on NBC's New Year's Eve with Carson Daly. As Drake was not available to sing his verse, it was not featured in the performance. Lil Wayne and Drake performed the song on 106 and Park on December 31, 2010.

== Reception ==
The song received generally positive reviews from music critics. AllMusic writer David Jefferies called the song "grand" stating that it "swaggers and struts like a free man cruising through the club". Jon Caramanica of The New York Times described the song as "bombastic" and praised Lil Wayne's musical diversity, comparing the song to more recent hits ("I'm Single" and "No Love") and their different musical styles, stating "[his] successes in the last few months have been in different, and divergent, modes... diversity is Lil Wayne’s strength". Despite describing the song as "generic", Los Angeles Times writer Jeff Weiss wrote positively of the song, stating that "[it] achieves a kind of bizarre solipsism". However, he also felt that "Wayne’s done this shtick better before".

== Chart performance ==
After experiencing strong digital sales on release, the song debuted at number 6 on the US Billboard Hot 100 chart dated September 4, 2010, making it the highest debuting song on the chart for that week, and at number 1 on the Billboard Hot Digital Songs chart, becoming the first Lil Wayne song to top this chart. With 225,000 copies downloaded during the first week, it was Wayne's best sales week as a lead artist and as of December 27 the single has sold over a million copies. The song also peaked at number one on the Billboard Hot Rap Songs chart, and also at number four on the Billboard Hot R&B/Hip-Hop Songs chart.

"Right Above It" also achieved modest international charting. The song debuted on the UK Singles Chart at number 37 on 5 September 2010 following strong digital downloading from the album. This marks Lil Wayne's second Top 40 hit in the UK after "Lollipop" peaked at number 26 during 2008. The single also peaked at number 11 on the UK R&B Chart. The song also peaked at number 34 in Canada, and number 27 in Belgium.

== Appearances ==
As of June 2015, the song is featured in the opening of the HBO television series Ballers. It was also used as the walkout song for former UFC Light Heavyweight and Heavyweight Champion Daniel Cormier.

== Credits and personnel ==
- Songwriting – Dwayne Carter, Aubrey Graham, Daniel Johnson, Andrew Canton
- Production – Kane Beatz

== Charts ==
=== Weekly charts ===
Chart (2010–2011)	Peak position
Australia (ARIA)	98
Belgium (Ultratip Bubbling Under Wallonia)	27
Canada Hot 100 (Billboard)	34
UK Hip Hop/R&B (OCC)	11
UK Singles (OCC)	37
US Billboard Hot 100	6
US Hot R&B/Hip-Hop Songs (Billboard)	4
US Hot Rap Songs (Billboard)	1
US Rhythmic Airplay (Billboard)	5

=== Year-end charts ===
Chart (2010)	Position
US Billboard Hot 100	90
US Hot R&B/Hip-Hop Songs (Billboard)	61
US Rap Songs (Billboard)	25
Chart (2011)	Position
US Hot R&B/Hip-Hop Songs (Billboard)	70
US Rap Songs (Billboard)	20
US Rhythmic (Billboard)	41

== Certifications ==
Region	Certification	Certified units/sales
Australia (ARIA)	Gold	35,000^{‡}
United Kingdom (BPI)	Silver	200,000^{‡}
United States (RIAA)	5× Platinum	5,000,000^{‡}
^{‡} Sales+streaming figures based on certification alone.

== Release history ==
Country	Date	Format	Label
United States	August 17, 2010	Digital download	Young Money, Cash Money, Universal Motown
United Kingdom	August 23, 2010	Digital download	Young Money, Cash Money, Universal Island
