= Young Money Entertainment =

American record label

- Parent company: Universal Music Group
- Founded: 2003; 23 years ago
- Founder: Lil Wayne
- Distributors: Republic Records; Cash Money Records (2005–2018); Universal Motown (2005–2011)
- Genre: Various, mainly hip hop
- Country of origin: United States
- Location: New Orleans, Louisiana
- Official website: youngmoney.com

Young Money Entertainment (also known as Young Money Records) is an American record label and former supergroup founded by rapper Lil Wayne in 2003. It was launched as an imprint of Cash Money Records — a joint venture colloquially branded as Young Money Cash Money Billionaires (abbreviated as YMCMB) — and Republic Records until 2018; it has since operated as an imprint of Republic. Wayne's longtime affiliate, rapper Mack Maine, was appointed the company's president in 2009.

The label has released 16 albums that topped the Billboard 200 chart: Tha Carter III (2008), I Am Not a Human Being (2010), Tha Carter IV (2011), Tha Carter V (2018), and Funeral (2020) by Lil Wayne; Thank Me Later (2010), Take Care (2011), Nothing Was the Same (2013), If You're Reading This It's Too Late (2015), What a Time to Be Alive (2015; along with Epic Records artist Future), Views (2016), More Life (2017), and Scorpion (2018) by Drake; and Pink Friday (2010) and Pink Friday: Roman Reloaded (2012) by Nicki Minaj.

Since its formation, the label has signed and released projects for artists including Wayne himself, Nicki Minaj, Drake, Tyga, DJ Khaled, Austin Mahone, Cory Gunz, Gudda Gudda, and Jae Millz, among others. The label is also the namesake of a supergroup that has released three studio albums — We Are Young Money (2009), Rich Gang (2013; with Cash Money Records), and Young Money: Rise of an Empire (2014).

== History ==
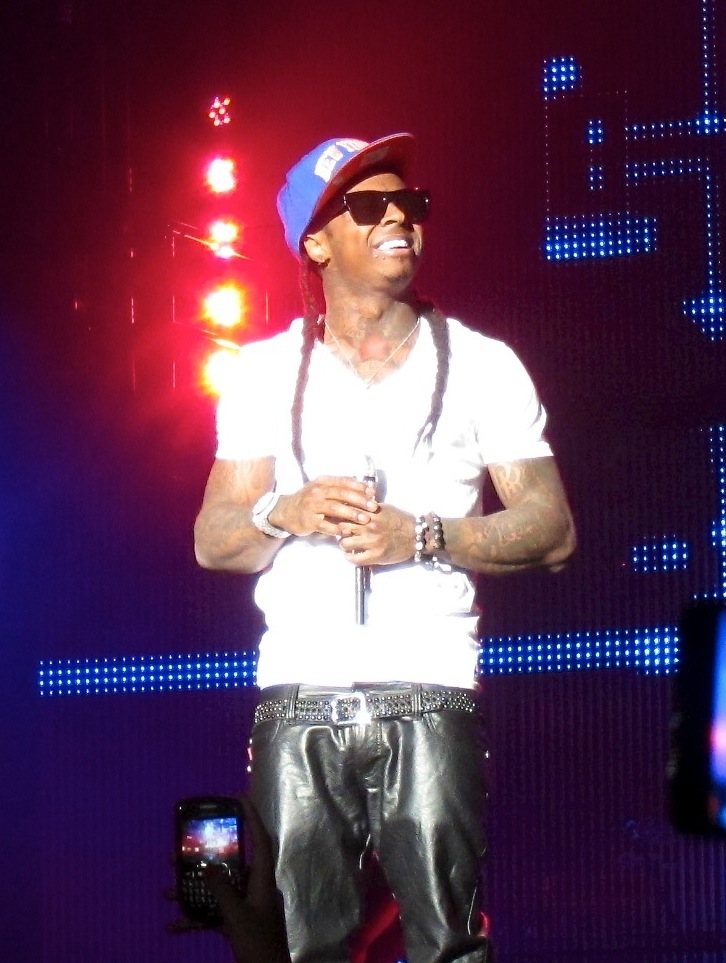
Lil Wayne founded the label in 2003 and remained president until 2007.

=== 2003–2010: Label beginnings and We Are Young Money ===
In February 2003, Lil Wayne launched the Young Money Entertainment label, a 51-49% joint venture of both Wayne and Cash Money Records co-founder Birdman. In 2007, In an interview with Vibe magazine, Lil Wayne detailed he stepped down as President of the label, and had given the position to Cortez Bryant. Later in the year, rapper Curren$y, who had been with the label since 2004, took to his MySpace page to announce he was no longer working with Young Money. Beginning in 2009, Mack Maine has served as the label's president. In the summer of 2009, Lil Wayne confirmed the signings of former B2K member Omarion, Canadian rapper Drake (who had signed a joint venture between Cash Money Records and Young Money), and Queens rapper Nicki Minaj, who had already released her third mixtape Beam Me Up Scotty under the label earlier in the year. In October, Omarion confirmed that he had amicably departed Young Money two months after signing with them in June.

To promote the label's first collaboration album, We Are Young Money, Young Money artists embarked on the Young Money Tour. The collaborative album, led by founders Lil Wayne and Mack Maine, featured respective label members Gudda Gudda, Jae Millz, Drake, Tyga (who had signed with the group in 2008), Shanell, Minaj, and forthcoming artist Lil Twist. The album was released on December 21, 2009, and debuted at number nine on the US Billboard 200 chart, selling 142,000 copies in its first week. The album was certified gold by the Recording Industry Association of America (RIAA) for shipments of 500,000 copies in the United States. We Are Young Money featured the highly successful single "BedRock", which debuted at number 36 on the Billboard Hot 100 on the week ending December 12, 2009.

On the week ending March 13, 2010, the song reached a peak of two, making it the most successful single by the group on the chart. "BedRock" debuted in the UK Singles Chart on February 6, 2010, at forty. On March 6, 2010, the single climbed to twenty two, and the subsequent week the single climbed to eighteen, marking Young Money's first Top 20 hit in the UK. Peaking at number nine on April 3, 2010, making it Young Money's first Top 10 hit in the UK.

=== 2010–2014: Success and further signings ===
The label had three of the top 10 highest hip hop album sales of 2010 with Drake's Thank Me Later, and Lil Wayne's Rebirth and I Am Not a Human Being. On March 6, 2010, Lil Wayne confirmed that rapper Cory Gunz was the latest artist to sign. In August, Minaj announced her debut studio album Pink Friday, Young Money's first female album. Upon its November 2010 release, the album peaked at number one on the US Billboard 200 and Top R&B/Hip-Hop Album charts, selling 375,000 copies in its first week, and becoming the second highest-selling-debut album of a female rapper since 1998.

In 2011, Konvict Muzik artist T-Pain announced he was signing to the Young Money after he and Akon agreed to part ways after his last Konvict release RevolveR. Later that year, T-Pain revealed that he was close to signing a deal with Young Money, but it never concluded. In November 2011, Lil Wayne introduced 14-year-old singer Torion Sellers to Young Money. In early 2012, PJ Morton of Maroon 5 was confirmed to have signed with Young Money. On February 12, 2012, singer Christina Milian announced she had signed with Young Money per her Twitter account. Also in 2012, Young Money released both Tyga and Minaj's second studio albums Careless World: Rise of the Last King and Pink Friday: Roman Reloaded on February 21, and April 2, respectively. Upon their respective releases, both albums peaked at number one on the US Billboard Top R&B/Hip-Hop Albums and Top Rap Albums charts. Roman Reloaded sold 253,000 copies in its first week, and peaked at No. 1 on both the Canada and US Billboard 200.

On February 15, 2013, Mack Maine announced group W3 the Future and Lil Wayne's 14-year-old daughter Reginae Carter had signed to Young Money. In the same year, Young Money released Lil Wayne's I Am Not a Human Being II, Tyga's Hotel California and Drake's Nothing Was the Same on March 26, April 7, and September 24, respectively. On May 14, 2013, Morton released his first and only major-label album with the Young Money, New Orleans, before departing the label soon thereafter. In June, upcoming artist Chanel West Coast announced she had been signed to Young Money after she went to Miami to meet Lil Wayne and play her music for him. She simultaneously announced her upcoming mixtape, Now You Know, would be under the label.

In December 2012, Mack Maine announced a second Young Money album would be released. In February 2013, label co-owner Birdman released a compilation mixtape with Cash Money and Young Money titled Rich Gang: All Stars. Shortly after, Birdman announced compilation album Rich Gang and its schedule for release to be on May 21, 2013. He added Rich Gang would feature members of Cash Money, Young Money and various Young Money collaborators. The first single from the project, "Tapout", was released on March 12, 2013, and featured Lil Wayne, Future, Mack Maine, and Nicki Minaj and produced by 808 Mafia's Southside and TM88. The album would then be pushed back to July 23, 2013.

On January 22, 2014, it was revealed that Young Money would be releasing their own compilation album in March 2014, titled Young Money: Rise of an Empire. In February, Dominican rapper Euro was announced as the newest artist to join Young Money's roster. The album was released on March 11, 2014, and featured the returns of Wayne, Drake, Minaj, Tyga, Shanell, Maine, Millz, Gudda, and Twist; the introductions of Chanel West Coast, and the final appearances of Cory Gunz, PJ Morton, and Christina Milian in her first project with the label. That same day, the first single "We Alright" featuring Lil Wayne, Birdman and Euro was released. Drake's Nothing Was the Same leftover "Trophies" would also be included on the album. The album's second single, "Senile", was released February 14, 2014. It is by Tyga, Nicki Minaj and Lil Wayne and was produced by David D.A. Doman. "Trophies" and Minaj's "Lookin Ass" were met with more chart success than the first two singles.

=== 2015–present: Legal disputes and roster decline ===
After years of tensions with Birdman and Universal Music Group over unpaid advances and rights to his catalogue, Lil Wayne filed for lawsuit in 2015 initially for $51 million. In September 2016, after years of managing disputes, it was reported that Tyga had left Young Money after eight years. In January 2017, longtime member Jae Millz announced that he had departed Young Money.

In 2018, Lil Wayne and Universal settled, which detailed Lil Wayne would be compensated over $10 million from previously failed payments, and Young Money's ownership would be transferred from Cash Money to Universal directly. Additionally, Birdman's 49 percent ownership in Young Money would be transferred entirely to Wayne, which took effect on September 13, 2018. In 2019, it was speculated that Drake had also departed the label after his third EP, The Best in the World Pack, was released under Republic Records, making it his first project since his 2009 mixtape So Far Gone that was not released by Young Money.

In June 2020, Lil Wayne, through the Young Money name, sold his master recordings in a settlement from Republic Records to its overhead company, Universal Music Group for $100 million. It was confirmed later in December that the settlement not only included his masters, but also the entire Young Money Entertainment catalog, including Nicki Minaj, Drake, Tyga, among other artists in their roster. As of December 2020, UMG reportedly owns all of Drake's pre-2018 album catalogue that has been released with the Young Money record label.

In June 2021, Chanel West Coast confirmed she had left Young Money years prior due to Minaj not wanting her a part of the label. In September 2024, Minaj also confirmed her contract with Young Money had "ended years ago."

== Artists ==
=== Current ===
Artist	Year signed	Albums under label
Lil Wayne	Founder	10
Mack Maine	2005	—N/a
Gudda Gudda	2008	—N/a
Shanell	2008	1
Lil Twist	2010	3
Cory Gunz	2010	1
Reginae Carter	2013	—N/a
Euro	2014	—N/a
Baby E	2015	5
Hoodybaby	2015	1
Jay Jones	2017	1
Vice Versa	2018	—N/a
Drizzy P	2022	—N/a

=== Former ===
Artist	Years active/signed	Major projects under label	Refs
Currensy	2004–2007	Young Money: The Mixtape, Vol. 1 (2005)	
Boo	2005	—N/a	
Glasses Malone	2007–2011	Beach Cruiser (2011)	
Jae Millz	2008–2017	The Virgo Mixtape: "He Nasty" (2009); Zone Out Season 2 (with Big Mike; 2009); The Flood Never Ended (2010); The Flood Warning (2010); The Virgo Mixtape: "He Still Nasty" Vol.2 (2010); The Flood (2010); The Flood: Category 5 (2011); The Virgo 4 Mixtape "How Nasty Can He Get" (2012); Dead Presidents 2 (2013); R.O.T.S. (2013)	
Tyga	2008–2016	Careless World: Rise of the Last King (2012); Hotel California (2013); Fan of a Fan: The Album (with Chris Brown; 2015)	
Drake	2009–2018	Thank Me Later (2010); Take Care (2011); Nothing Was the Same (2013); Views (2016); If You're Reading This It's Too Late (2015); What a Time to Be Alive (with Future; 2015); More Life (2017); Scary Hours (2018); Scorpion (2018)	
Nicki Minaj	2009–2022	Sucka Free (2008); Beam Me Up Scotty (2009); Pink Friday (2010); Pink Friday: Roman Reloaded (2012); Pink Friday: Roman Reloaded – The Re-Up (2012); The Pinkprint (2014); Queen (2018); Queen Radio: Volume 1 (2022)	
Omarion	2009	—N/a	
DJ Khaled	2010–2014	We the Best Forever (2011)	
PJ Morton	2012–2014	New Orleans (2013)	
Christina Milian	2012–2014	—N/a (Note: Milian appeared on the 2014 collaborative album Young Money: Rise of an Empire, but never released any music under the label.)	
Chanel West Coast	2012–2015	Now You Know (2013); Waves (2015)	

== In-house producers ==
- Detail
- The Olympicks

== Discography ==
=== Compilation albums ===
List of compilation albums, with selected chart positions and certifications
Title	Album details	Peak chart positions			Certifications
Title	Album details	US	US R&B	US Rap	Certifications
We Are Young Money	Released: December 21, 2009; Label: Young Money, Cash Money, Republic; Formats: CD, digital download	9	3	1	RIAA: Platinum
Rich Gang (with Cash Money Records)	Released: July 23, 2013; Label: Young Money, Cash Money, Republic; Formats: CD, digital download	9	2	2	
Rise of an Empire	Released: March 11, 2014; Label: Young Money, Cash Money, Republic; Formats: CD, digital download	7	4	2	

=== Mixtapes ===
List of compilation albums, with selected details
Title	Album details
Young Money: The Mixtape Vol. 1	Released: 2005; Label: Young Money, Cash Money; Format: CD, Digital download

=== Singles ===
List of singles, with selected chart positions
Title	Year	Peak chart positions							Certifications	Album
Title	Year	US	US R&B	US Rap	CAN	IRE	NZ	UK	Certifications	Album
"Every Girl"	2009	10	2	2	—	—	—	—	RIAA: Gold	We Are Young Money
"BedRock" (featuring Lloyd)	2009	2	2	1	12	17	21	9	RIAA: 7× Platinum; BPI: Platinum; RMNZ: Platinum	We Are Young Money
"Steady Mobbin" (featuring Gucci Mane)	2010	48	17	6	—	—	—	—	RIAA: 2× Platinum	We Are Young Money
"Roger That"	2010	56	15	6	—	—	—	—		We Are Young Money
"We Alright" (featuring Euro, Birdman and Lil Wayne)	2014	—	—	—	—	—	—	—		Young Money: Rise of an Empire
"Trophies" (featuring Drake)	2014	50	13	5	—	—	—	—	BPI: Silver; RMNZ: Platinum	Young Money: Rise of an Empire
"Lookin Ass" (featuring Nicki Minaj)	2014	—	28	16	—	—	—	—		Young Money: Rise of an Empire
"—" denotes releases that did not chart or receive certification.

=== Other charted songs ===
Title	Year	Peak chart positions			Certifications	Album
Title	Year	US	US R&B	US Rap	Certifications	Album
"Senile"	2014	—	50	—		Young Money: Rise of an Empire
"—" denotes releases that did not chart.

== Label discography ==
Albums released on Young Money Entertainment label
Artist	Album details	Peak chart positions										Certifications	Sales
Artist	Album details	US	US R&B	US Rap	AUS	CAN	GER	IRE	NZ	SWI	UK	Certifications	Sales
Lil Wayne	Title: Tha Carter III; Released: June 10, 2008; Singles: "Lollipop", "A Milli", "Got Money", "Mrs. Officer"	1	1	1	47	1	29	34	—	—	23	RIAA: 8× Platinum; BPI: Gold; MC: 2× Platinum	
Drake	Title: So Far Gone – EP; Released: September 15, 2009; Singles: "Best I Ever Had", "Successful"	6	3	2	—	15	—	—	—	—	—	RIAA: Gold	
Young Money	Title: We Are Young Money; Released: December 21, 2009; Singles: "Every Girl", "BedRock", "Roger That"	9	3	1	—	—	—	—	—	—	—	RIAA: Platinum	
Lil Wayne	Title: Rebirth; Released: February 2, 2010; Singles: "Prom Queen", "On Fire", "Drop the World"	2	1	1	51	5	—	—	33	15	24	RIAA: Gold	US: 775,000
Drake	Title: Thank Me Later; Released: June 15, 2010; Singles: "Over", "Find Your Love", "Miss Me", "Fancy"	1	1	1	81	1	34	35	35	69	15	RIAA: 3× Platinum; BPI: Platinum	US: 1,551,000
Lil Wayne	Title: I Am Not a Human Being; Released: September 27, 2010; Singles: "Right Above It"	1	1	1	60	16	—	—	—	46	56	RIAA: Platinum	
Nicki Minaj	Title: Pink Friday; Released: November 19, 2010; Singles: "Your Love", "Right Thru Me", "Roman's Revenge", "Did It On'em", "Moment 4 Life", "Super Bass", "Girls Fall Like Dominoes", "Fly"	1	1	1	19	8	—	17	15	—	16	RIAA: 3× Platinum; ARIA: Platinum; BPI: Platinum	
Lil Wayne	Title: Tha Carter IV; Released: August 29, 2011; Singles: "6 Foot 7 Foot", "John", "How to Love", "She Will", "Mirror"	1	1	1	9	1	13	19	8	9	8	RIAA: 5× Platinum; BPI: Gold	
Drake	Title: Take Care; Released: November 15, 2011; Singles: "Marvins Room", "Headlines", "Make Me Proud", "The Motto", "Take Care", "HYFR (Hell Ya Fucking Right)", "Crew Love"	1	1	1	15	1	42	30	19	45	5	RIAA: 6× Platinum; BPI: 2× Platinum	US: 2,000,000
Tyga	Title: Careless World: Rise of the Last King; Released: February 21, 2012; Singles: "Far Away", "Still Got It", "Rack City", "Faded", "Make It Nasty"	4	1	1	33	6	—	—	—	—	56	RIAA: Platinum	US: 307,000
Nicki Minaj	Title: Pink Friday: Roman Reloaded; Released: April 3, 2012; Singles: "Starships", "Right by My Side", "Beez in the Trap", "Pound The Alarm", "Va Va Voom"	1	1	1	5	1	49	2	3	29	1	RIAA: 2× Platinum; ARIA: Gold; BPI: Platinum; IRMA: Platinum	US: 915,000
Lil Wayne	Title: I Am Not a Human Being II; Released: March 26, 2013; Singles: "My Homies Still", "No Worries", "Love Me", "Rich As Fuck"	2	2	1	43	5	70	85	—	35	29	RIAA: 2× Platinum; MC: Gold	US: 529,000
Tyga	Title: Hotel California; Released: April 9, 2013; Singles: "Dope", "For the Road", "Show You"	7	2	1	20	5	—	42	8	—	11	RIAA: Gold	US: 84,000
PJ Morton	Title: New Orleans; Released: May 14, 2013; Singles: "Only One"	—	—	—	—	—	—	—	—	—	—		
Rich Gang	Title: Rich Gang; Released: July 23, 2013; Singles: "Tapout", "We Been On"	9	2	2	—	—	—	—	—	—	—		
Drake	Title: Nothing Was the Same; Released: September 24, 2013; Singles: "Started from the Bottom", "Hold On, We're Going Home", "All Me", "Pound Cake", "The Language", "Too Much", "Worst Behavior"	1	1	1	2	1	14	4	4	11	2	RIAA: 4× Platinum; BPI: Platinum; MC: 3× Platinum	US: 1,029,000; UK: 100,000
Young Money	Title: Young Money: Rise of an Empire; Released: March 11, 2014; Singles: "We Alright", "Trophies", "Lookin Ass"	7	4	2	—	24	—	—	—	—	148		
Nicki Minaj	Title: The Pinkprint; Released: December 15, 2014; Singles: "Pills n Potions", "Anaconda", "Only", "Bed of Lies", "Feeling Myself"	2	1	1	19	6	70	31	25	—	22	RIAA: 2× Platinum; BPI: Platinum; GLF: Gold	
Drake	Title: If You're Reading This It's Too Late; Released: February 13, 2015; Singles: "Preach", "Energy"	1	1	1	2	1	89	13	3	7	3	RIAA: 3× Platinum; BPI: Platinum; MC: 2× Platinum	CAN: 89,000; US: 1,071,000
Chris Brown x Tyga	Title: Fan of a Fan: The Album; Released: February 24, 2015; Singles: "Ayo", "Bitches N Marijuana"	7	3	3	3	11	14	31	9	6	7	BPI: Gold	
Drake x Future	Title: What a Time to Be Alive; Released: September 20, 2015; Singles: "Jumpman", "Big Rings"	1	1	1	4	1	—	30	8	—	6	RIAA: 2× Platinum; BPI: Gold; MC: Platinum	
Drake	Title: Views; Released: April 29, 2016; Singles: "Hotline Bling", "One Dance", "Pop Style"	1	1	1	1	1	11	2	1	4	1	RIAA: 6× Platinum; ARIA: Gold; BPI: 2× Platinum; BVMI: Gold; MC: 6× Platinum	
Lil Wayne	Title: Dedication 6; Released: December 25, 2017	—	—	—	—	—	—	—	—	—	—		
Lil Wayne	Title: Dedication 6: Reloaded; Released: December 29, 2017	—	—	—	—	—	—	—	—	—	—		
Drake	Title: Scary Hours – EP; Released: January 19, 2018; Singles: "Diplomatic Immunity"	—	—	—	—	—	—	—	—	—	—		
Drake	Title: Scorpion; Released: June 29, 2018; Singles: "God's Plan", "Nice for What", "I'm Upset", "Don't Matter to Me", "In My Feelings", "Nonstop"	1	1	1	1	1	8	1	1	1	1	RIAA: 5× Platinum; ARIA: 2× Platinum; BPI: 2× Platinum; MC: 2× Platinum; RMNZ: Platinum	US: 233,000
Nicki Minaj	Title: Queen; Released: August 10, 2018; Singles: "Chun-Li", "Bed", "Barbie Dreams"	2	2	2	4	2	18	5	8	5	5	RIAA: Platinum; BPI: Gold	
Lil Wayne	Title: Tha Carter V; Released: September 28, 2018; Singles: "Uproar"	1	6	6	—	24	—	—	—	—	99	RIAA: 2× Platinum	
Lil Wayne	Title: Funeral; Released: January 31, 2020; Singles: "I Do It", "Shimmy"	1	1	—	68	5	—	73	—	29	61		
