= Lil Twist =

American rapper from Texas

- Also known as: Twizzy F.
- Born: Christopher Lynn Moore; January 11, 1993 (age 33); Dallas, Texas, U.S.
- Genre: Hip hop
- Occupations: Rapper; songwriter
- Years active: 2004–present
- Labels: Young Money; Cash Money; Republic

Christopher Lynn Moore (born January 11, 1993), better known by his stage name Lil Twist, is an American rapper from Dallas, Texas. He signed to Lil Wayne's Young Money Entertainment, an imprint of Republic Records in 2010.

== Career ==
Lil Twist is from Dallas, Texas. He dropped out of high school after completing one year.

When he was 12 years old, Lil Twist went to a Lil Wayne concert in Tyler, Texas and opened for Lil Wayne. Impressed, Wayne flew Lil Twist to Atlanta to see how he was in a recording studio.

He released his first single, "The Texas Twist", when he was 10 years old, which was #1 locally in Dallas for 6 straight weeks.

He released mixtapes such as The Golden Child, and a single, "Love Affair" to build anticipation for his planned but never released album, Bad Decisions.

He was featured in XXL hip hop magazine's "2011 Freshman Class". Since then, he has been featured as a guest artist on recordings by Bieber in "Twerk", "Wind It" and others, 2 Chainz in "Do What I Want" and with Miley Cyrus. His 2012 mixtape 3 Weeks in Miami is a collaboration with Khalil.

Lil Twist has made guest appearances on Disney Channel's animated series Fish Hooks as the voice of Brandon Bubbler.

On April 11, 2017, Lil Twist dropped his mixtape, Young Carter.

== Personal life ==
On July 11, 2013, Lil Twist was arrested for DUI in Calabasas, California. He was driving Justin Bieber's Fisker Karma and was alleged to be going between 60 and 70 mph in a 30 mph zone.

Lil Twist was arrested and charged with making criminal threats, burglary, grand theft, battery and 2 counts of assault with a deadly weapon in March 2015. This was after Twist and four others assaulted Disney actor Kyle Massey and Massey's brother, Christopher Massey. On December 1, 2016, Lil Twist pleaded no contest to six charges and received a one-year sentence. He was released from prison in March 2017 after serving seven and one-half weeks of his sentence.

== Discography ==
=== Albums ===
List of albums, showing year released
Title	Album details
I Don't Wanna Grow Up	Released: 2004; Format: CD, Digital download
Don't Get It Twisted	Released: 2012
Anger Management	Released: August 26, 2016; Format: CD, Digital download

=== Compilation albums ===
List of compilation albums, with selected chart positions
Title	Album details	Peak chart positions		
Title	Album details	US	US R&B	US Rap
We Are Young Money	Released: December 21, 2009 (US); Label: Young Money, Cash Money, Universal Republic; Formats: CD, digital download	9	3	1
Young Money: Rise of an Empire	Released: March 11, 2014 (US); Label: Young Money, Cash Money, Republic; Formats: CD, digital download	7	4	2

=== Mixtapes ===
List of mixtapes, showing year released
Title	Album details
Thowed Young Kids (with Lil Za)	Released: 2007; Format: Digital download
Year Book	Released: August 21, 2009; Format: Digital download
Class President	Released: November 21, 2009; Format: Digital download
The Takeover	Released: October 29, 2010; Format: Digital download
The Golden Child	Released: December 20, 2011; Format: Digital download
3 Weeks in Miami (with Khalil)	Released: February 14, 2012; Format: Digital download
The Golden Child 2	Released: January 20, 2016; Format: Digital download
Young Carter	Released: November 12, 2017; Format: Digital download
The Pregame Tape	Released: November 15, 2018; Format: Digital download

=== Singles ===
As lead artist

List of singles, with selected chart positions
Title	Year	Peak chart positions	Album
Title	Year	US R&B	Album
"The Leak" (featuring Lil Wayne)	2009	77	Year Book
"Little Secret" (featuring Bow Wow)	2010	—	Non-album single
"Love Affair" (featuring Lil Wayne)	2011	87	Class President
"New Money" (featuring Mishon)	2011	—	Don't Get It Twisted
"Turn't Up" (featuring Busta Rhymes)	2012	88	Don't Get It Twisted
"Pyrex" (featuring Cory Gunz)	2014	—	The Golden Child 2
"Good Credit" (featuring Foolie Faime)	2014	—	The Golden Child 2
"—" denotes a recording that did not chart or was not released in that territory.

=== Other charted songs ===
List of singles, with selected chart positions
Title	Year	Peak chart positions		Album
Title	Year	US Bub	US R&B/HH	Album
"Popular" (Lil Wayne featuring Lil Twist)	2010	13	—	I Am Not a Human Being
"Hey Lil Mama" (Khalil featuring Lil Twist)	2011	—	111^{[A]}	—N/a
"Go" (Chrystian featuring Lil Twist)	2013	—	110^{[A]}	—N/a
"Ball Hard" (Lil Wayne featuring Lil Twist)	2020	21	—	Funeral
"—" denotes a recording that did not chart or was not released in that territory.

- A. Charted only on the Bubbling Under Hot 100 Singles or Bubbling Under R&B/Hip-Hop Songs charts.
- B. "YM Salute" did not chart on the Hot Rap Songs chart but reached #41 on the Rap Digital Songs chart.
