= Billboard Year-End Hot Rap Songs of 2010 =

American music chart

This is a list of Billboard magazine's Top Hot Rap Songs of 2010.

No.	Title	Artist(s)
1	"Nothin' on You"	B.o.B featuring Bruno Mars
2	"BedRock"	Young Money featuring Lloyd
3	"Over"	Drake
4	"How Low"	Ludacris
5	"Say Something"	Timbaland featuring Drake
6	"My Chick Bad"	Ludacris featuring Nicki Minaj
7	"Love the Way You Lie"	Eminem featuring Rihanna
8	"Empire State of Mind"	Jay-Z featuring Alicia Keys
9	"Your Love"	Nicki Minaj
10	"Miss Me"	Drake featuring Lil Wayne
11	"Airplanes"	B.o.B featuring Hayley Williams
12	"Money to Blow"	Birdman featuring Lil Wayne and Drake
13	"Tie Me Down"	New Boyz featuring Ray J
14	"Lose My Mind"	Young Jeezy featuring Plies
15	"Forever"	Drake, Kanye West, Lil Wayne and Eminem
16	"Fancy"	Drake featuring T.I. and Swizz Beatz
17	"Steady Mobbin"	Young Money featuring Gucci Mane
18	"Got Your Back"	T.I. featuring Keri Hilson
19	"Teach Me How to Dougie"	Cali Swag District
20	"B.M.F. (Blowin' Money Fast)"	Rick Ross featuring Styles P
21	"All I Do Is Win"	DJ Khaled featuring T-Pain, Ludacris, Snoop Dogg and Rick Ross
22	"I Wanna Rock"	Snoop Dogg
23	"Gangsta Luv"	Snoop Dogg featuring The-Dream
24	"Sex Room"	Ludacris featuring Trey Songz
25	"Right Above It"	Lil Wayne featuring Drake

== See also ==
- 2010 in music
- Billboard Year-End Hot 100 singles of 2010
- Billboard Year-End Hot R&B/Hip-Hop Songs of 2010
- List of Billboard number-one rap singles of 2010
