= Billboard Year-End Hot R&B/Hip-Hop Songs of 2010 =

American music chart

This is a list of Billboard magazine's Top Hot R&B/Hip-Hop Songs of 2010.

No.	Title	Artist(s)
1	"Un-Thinkable (I'm Ready)"	Alicia Keys
2	"There Goes My Baby"	Usher
3	"It Kills Me"	Melanie Fiona
4	"Everything to Me"	Monica
5	"Say Aah"	Trey Songz featuring Fabolous
6	"Neighbors Know My Name"	Trey Songz
7	"Hey Daddy (Daddy's Home)"	Usher featuring Plies
8	"I Am"	Mary J. Blige
9	"Deuces"	Chris Brown featuring Tyga and Kevin McCall
10	"Sex Therapy"	Robin Thicke
11	"Love All Over Me"	Monica
12	"I Invented Sex"	Trey Songz featuring Drake
13	"How Low"	Ludacris
14	"Say Something"	Timbaland featuring Drake
15	"Find Your Love"	Drake
16	"Over"	Drake
17	"My Chick Bad"	Ludacris featuring Nicki Minaj
18	"Ain't Leavin Without You"	Jaheim
19	"Lose My Mind"	Young Jeezy featuring Plies
20	"Try Sleeping with a Broken Heart"	Alicia Keys
21	"BedRock"	Young Money featuring Lloyd
22	"Bittersweet"	Fantasia
23	"Fistful of Tears"	Maxwell
24	"Miss Me"	Drake featuring Lil Wayne
25	"Rude Boy"	Rihanna
26	"Your Love"	Nicki Minaj
27	"Ride"	Ciara featuring Ludacris
28	"Finding My Way Back"	Jaheim
29	"OMG"	Usher featuring will.i.am
30	"Nothin' on You"	B.o.B featuring Bruno Mars
31	"Bottoms Up"	Trey Songz featuring Nicki Minaj
32	"Lil Freak"	Usher featuring Nicki Minaj
33	"Bad Habits"	Maxwell
34	"Money to Blow"	Birdman featuring Drake and Lil Wayne
35	"Fancy"	Drake featuring T.I. and Swizz Beatz
36	"Papers"	Usher
37	"Soldier of Love"	Sade
38	"Holding You Down (Goin' in Circles)"	Jazmine Sullivan
39	"Sex Room"	Ludacris featuring Trey Songz
40	"B.M.F. (Blowin' Money Fast)"	Rick Ross featuring Styles P
41	"All I Do Is Win"	DJ Khaled featuring T-Pain, Ludacris, Snoop Dogg and Rick Ross
42	"Champagne Life"	Ne-Yo
43	"Why Would You Stay?"	Kem
44	"Can't Be Friends"	Trey Songz
45	"Pretty Wings"	Maxwell
46	"Window Seat"	Erykah Badu
47	"You're the One"	Dondria
48	"O Let's Do It"	Waka Flocka Flame
49	"Empire State of Mind"	Jay-Z and Alicia Keys
50	"Steady Mobbin"	Young Money featuring Gucci Mane
51	"Teach Me How to Dougie"	Cali Swag District
52	"Pretty Boy Swag"	Soulja Boy
53	"I'm Back"	T.I.
54	"On to the Next One"	Jay-Z featuring Swizz Beatz
55	"Got Your Back"	T.I. featuring Keri Hilson
56	"No Hands"	Waka Flocka Flame featuring Roscoe Dash and Wale
57	"I Wanna Rock"	Snoop Dogg
58	"Hot Tottie"	Usher featuring Jay-Z
59	"Love the Way You Lie"	Eminem featuring Rihanna
60	"God in Me"	Mary Mary featuring Kierra Sheard
61	"Right Above It"	Lil Wayne featuring Drake
62	"Statistics"	Lyfe Jennings
63	"Lemonade"	Gucci Mane
64	"Baby by Me"	50 Cent featuring Ne-Yo
65	"Hello Good Morning"	Diddy – Dirty Money featuring T.I.
66	"Hard"	Rihanna featuring Jeezy
67	"All the Way Turnt Up"	Roscoe Dash featuring Soulja Boy Tell'em
68	"Imma Be"	Black Eyed Peas
69	"All I Want Is You"	Miguel featuring J. Cole
70	"Closer"	Corinne Bailey Rae
71	"Close to You"	BeBe & CeCe Winans
72	"Aston Martin Music"	Rick Ross featuring Drake and Chrisette Michele
73	"Wasted"	Gucci Mane featuring Plies
74	"Hold You"	Gyptian
75	"Women Lie, Men Lie"	Yo Gotti featuring Lil Wayne
76	"Forever"	Drake, Kanye West, Lil Wayne, and Eminem
77	"Sometimes I Cry"	Eric Benét
78	"Beamer, Benz, or Bentley"	Lloyd Banks featuring Juelz Santana
79	"Can't Live Without You"	Charlie Wilson
80	"We Got Hood Love"	Mary J. Blige featuring Trey Songz
81	"Million Dollar Bill"	Whitney Houston
82	"Roger That"	Young Money
83	"I Can Transform Ya"	Chris Brown featuring Lil Wayne and Swizz Beatz
84	"Whip My Hair"	Willow
85	"Lay It Down"	Lloyd
86	"Sponsor"	Teairra Mari featuring Gucci Mane and Soulja Boy Tell'em
87	"Super High"	Rick Ross featuring Ne-Yo
88	"Regret"	LeToya featuring Ludacris
89	"I Like"	Jeremih featuring Ludacris
90	"It's in the Mornin'"	Robin Thicke featuring Snoop Dogg
91	"Power"	Kanye West
92	"Spotlight"	Gucci Mane featuring Usher
93	"Speedin'"	Omarion
94	"Hard in da Paint"	Waka Flocka Flame
95	"Can It Stay"	Gerald Levert
96	"Love Like This"	Donell Jones
97	"I'm Single"	Lil Wayne
98	"What's Not to Love"	Dwele
99	"Beat It Up"	Gucci Mane featuring Trey Songz
100	"Hands Tied"	Toni Braxton

== See also ==
- 2010 in music
- Billboard Year-End Hot 100 singles of 2010
- Billboard Year-End Hot Rap Songs of 2010
- List of number-one R&B singles of 2010 (U.S.)
