= List of Billboard Hot 100 top-ten singles in 2010 =

This is a list of singles that have peaked in the Top 10 of the Billboard Hot 100 during 2010 (see 2010 in music). The date is when the song entered the top 10 for the first time.

Fifty-seven singles reached the top ten in 2010. Fifty acts scored a US top ten hit during the year, with nineteen acts reaching the top ten for the first time either as a lead artist or featured artist.

Kesha scored six top-ten singles during the year—"Tik Tok" (entered the top 10 on November 28, 2009), "Blah Blah Blah" (featuring 3OH!3), "Your Love Is My Drug", "My First Kiss" (3OH!3 featuring Kesha), "Take It Off", and "We R Who We R"—the most among all other artists. She is also the 11th female solo artist to garner four top-ten songs from a debut album. Rihanna had the second most top-ten singles in 2010, with five.

The single with the longest run in the top ten was "Just the Way You Are" by Bruno Mars which was his debut single, spending twenty-two consecutive weeks in the top ten. It spent four consecutive weeks at number one. The longest time that a 2010 single spent at number one was nine weeks by "Tik Tok" by Kesha, and seven weeks by "Love the Way You Lie" by Eminem featuring Rihanna. Train and The Black Eyed Peas were the only bands to get a top 10 single. "Hey, Soul Sister" by Train spent 19 weeks in the top 10 and spent a total of 55 weeks on the Hot 100.

== Top-ten singles ==
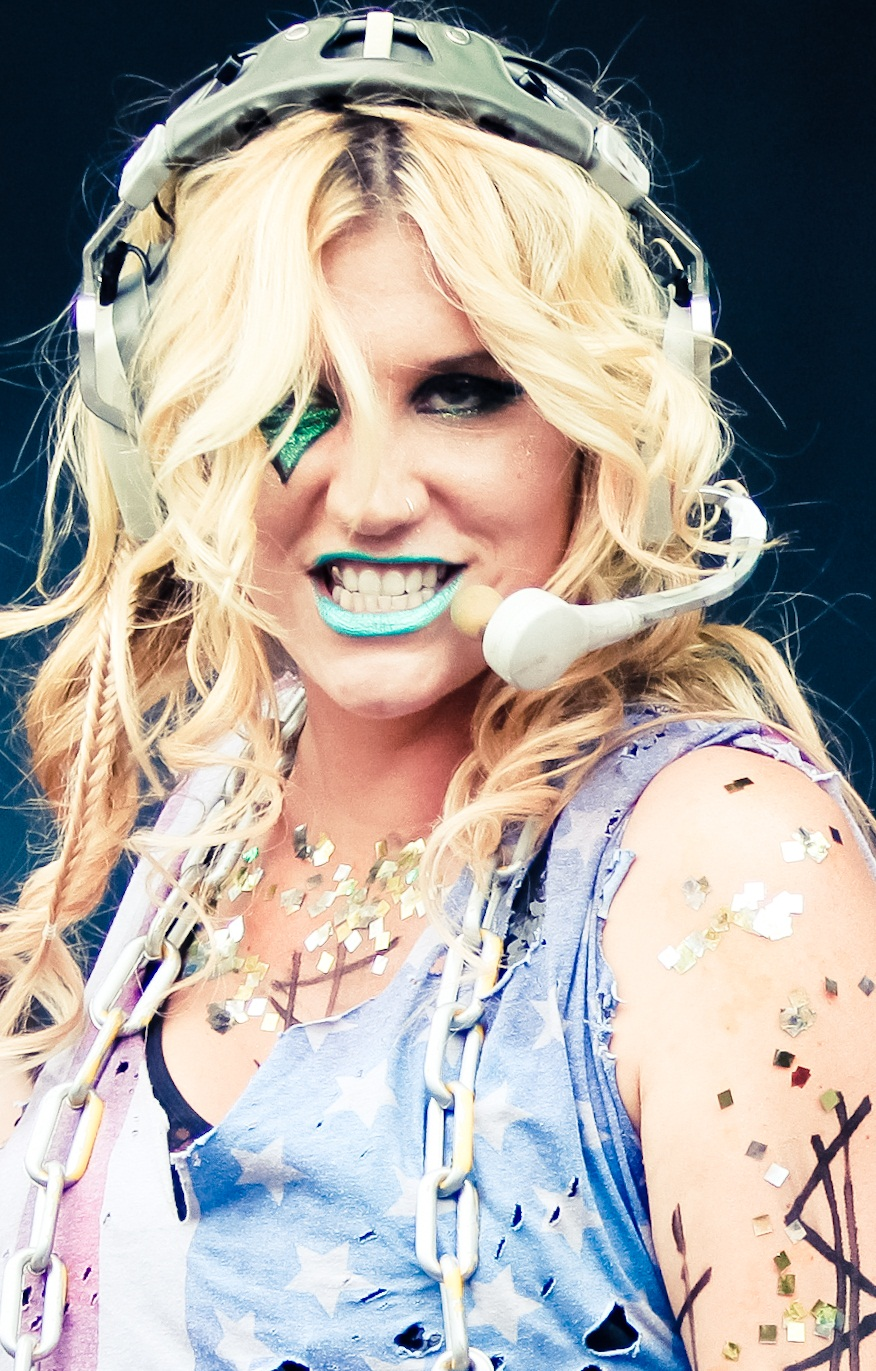
Kesha scored the most top ten hits in 2010 with six, including two number ones.

Key

- ↑ – indicates single's top 10 entry was also its Hot 100 debut
- † – indicates Best performing song of the year
- (#) – 2010 year-end top 10 single position and rank

List of Billboard Hot 100 top ten singles which peaked in 2010
Top ten entry date	Single	Artist(s)	Peak	Peak date	Weeks in top ten
Singles from 2009
November 21	"Replay"	Iyaz	2	January 9	14
November 28	"Need You Now" (#2)	Lady Antebellum	2	March 20	16
November 28	"Tik Tok" † (#1)	Kesha	1	January 2	20
December 5	"Sexy Bitch"	David Guetta featuring Akon	5	February 13	13
Singles from 2010
January 9	"Do You Remember"	Jay Sean featuring Sean Paul and Lil Jon	10	January 9	1
January 23	"Blah Blah Blah" ↑	Kesha featuring 3OH!3	7	January 23	1
January 23	"BedRock"	Young Money featuring Lloyd	2	March 13	13
January 23	"Hard"	Rihanna featuring Young Jeezy	8	January 30	4
January 30	"Hey, Soul Sister" (#3) ^{[A]}	Train	3	April 10	19
January 30	"How Low"	Ludacris	6	February 13	7
February 6	"Baby" ↑	Justin Bieber featuring Ludacris	5	February 6	5
February 6	"Today Was a Fairytale" ↑	Taylor Swift	2	February 6	1
February 13	"Imma Be"	The Black Eyed Peas	1	March 6	11
February 27	"We Are the World 25 for Haiti" ↑	Artists for Haiti	2	February 27	2
February 27	"In My Head" ^{[B]}	Jason Derulo	5	April 24	10
March 6	"Say Aah"	Trey Songz featuring Fabolous	9	March 13	2
March 13	"Rude Boy"	Rihanna	1	March 27	13
March 20	"Break Your Heart" (#10)	Taio Cruz featuring Ludacris	1	March 20	16
March 27	"Nothin' on You"	B.o.B featuring Bruno Mars	1	May 1	13
March 27	"Telephone"	Lady Gaga featuring Beyoncé	3	April 3	7
April 24	"OMG" (#5)	Usher featuring will.i.am	1	May 15	17
May 1	"Whataya Want from Me"	Adam Lambert	10	May 1	1
May 1	"Your Love Is My Drug"	Kesha	4	June 12	11
May 8	"Airplanes" (#6)	B.o.B featuring Hayley Williams	2	June 5	17
May 15	"Young Forever"	Jay-Z featuring Mr Hudson	10	May 15	1
May 22	"Not Afraid" ↑ ^{[C]}^{[D]}	Eminem	1	May 22	7
May 22	"My First Kiss" ↑	3OH!3 featuring Kesha	9	May 22	1
May 29	"California Gurls" (#4) ↑	Katy Perry featuring Snoop Dogg	1	June 19	17
May 29	"Alejandro"	Lady Gaga	5	June 26	7
June 5	"Can't Be Tamed" ↑	Miley Cyrus	8	June 5	1
June 12	"Bulletproof"	La Roux	8	June 12	2
June 19	"Billionaire"	Travie McCoy featuring Bruno Mars	4	June 26	9
June 19	"Rock That Body"	The Black Eyed Peas	9	June 19	2
June 26	"Find Your Love"	Drake	5	July 3	7
July 3	"Cooler Than Me"	Mike Posner	6	July 17	11
July 10	"Love the Way You Lie" (#7) ↑	Eminem featuring Rihanna	1	July 31	16
July 10	"Ridin' Solo" ^{[E]}	Jason Derulo	9	July 17	7
July 17	"Dynamite" (#9)	Taio Cruz	2	August 21	18
July 24	"I Like It"	Enrique Iglesias featuring Pitbull	4	August 28	13
August 14	"DJ Got Us Fallin' in Love"	Usher featuring Pitbull	4	October 9	15
August 14	"Teenage Dream"	Katy Perry	1	September 18	14
August 21	"Mine" ↑ ^{[F]}	Taylor Swift	3	August 21	5
September 4	"Right Above It" ↑	Lil Wayne featuring Drake	6	September 4	1
September 4	"Just the Way You Are"	Bruno Mars	1	October 2	22
September 4	"Magic"	B.o.B featuring Rivers Cuomo	10	September 4	1
September 11	"Take It Off"	Kesha	8	September 18	3
September 18	"Just a Dream"	Nelly	3	October 23	17
September 25	"Club Can't Handle Me"	Flo Rida featuring David Guetta	9	September 25	7
October 2	"Like a G6"	Far East Movement featuring The Cataracs and Dev	1	October 30	11
October 2	"Only Girl (In the World)"	Rihanna	1	December 4	15
October 23	"Speak Now" ↑	Taylor Swift	8	October 23	1
October 30	"Back to December" ↑	Taylor Swift	6	October 30	1
October 30	"Bottoms Up" ^{[G]}	Trey Songz featuring Nicki Minaj	6	November 6	9
November 6	"Raise Your Glass"	Pink	1	December 11	14
November 13	"We R Who We R" ↑	Kesha	1	November 13	14
November 20	"Firework"	Katy Perry	1	December 18	18
November 20	"What's My Name?"	Rihanna featuring Drake	1	November 20	14
November 27	"Teenage Dream" ↑	Glee Cast	8	November 27	1
December 11	"The Time (Dirty Bit)"	The Black Eyed Peas	4	December 18	10

Notes:

- ^{A} The single re-entered the Top 10 on the week ending 12 June 2010.
- ^{B} The single re-entered the Top 10 on the week ending 17 April 2010.
- ^{C} The single re-entered the Top 10 on the week ending 26 June 2010.
- ^{D} The single re-entered the Top 10 on the week ending 17 July 2010.
- ^{E} The single re-entered the Top 10 on the week ending 21 August 2010.
- ^{F} The single re-entered the Top 10 on the week ending 11 September 2010.
- ^{G} The single re-entered the Top 10 on the week ending 18 December 2010.

=== 2009 peaks ===
List of Billboard Hot 100 top ten singles in 2010 which peaked in 2009
Top ten entry date	Single	Artist(s)	Peak	Peak date	Weeks in top ten
June 27	"I Gotta Feeling" ↑	The Black Eyed Peas	1	July 11	22
August 15	"Down"	Jay Sean featuring Lil Wayne	1	October 17	24
August 29	"Party in the U.S.A." ↑	Miley Cyrus	2	August 29	16
September 19	"Whatcha Say"	Jason Derulo	1	November 14	18
October 3	"Empire State of Mind"	Jay-Z featuring Alicia Keys	1	November 28	16
October 24	"3" ↑	Britney Spears	1	October 24	11
October 24	"Fireflies"	Owl City	1	November 7	15
October 31	"Meet Me Halfway"	The Black Eyed Peas	7	November 7	6
November 14	"Bad Romance" (#8) ↑	Lady Gaga	2	December 5	17

=== 2011 peaks ===
List of Billboard Hot 100 top ten singles in 2010 which peaked in 2011
Top ten entry date	Single	Artist(s)	Peak	Peak date	Weeks in top ten
December 4	"Fuck You (Forget You)"^{[D]}	CeeLo Green	2	March 5	12
December 11	"Grenade"	Bruno Mars	1	January 8	17

== Artists with most top-ten songs ==
List of artists by total songs peaking in the top-ten
Artist	Numbers of songs
Kesha	6
The Black Eyed Peas	5
Rihanna	5
Bruno Mars	4
Taylor Swift	4
B.o.B	3
Drake	3
Jason Derulo	3
Katy Perry	3
Lady Gaga	3
Ludacris	3
David Guetta	2
Eminem	2
Jay Sean	2
Jay-Z	2
Lil Wayne	2
Miley Cyrus	2
Pitbull	2
Taio Cruz	2
Trey Songz	2
Usher	2
3OH!3	2

== See also ==
- 2010 in music
- List of Billboard Hot 100 number ones of 2010
- Billboard Year-End Hot 100 singles of 2010
