= List of number-one digital songs of 2009 (U.S.) =

2009 highest-selling digital singles in the United States

The highest-selling digital singles in the United States are ranked in the Hot Digital Songs chart, published by Billboard magazine. The data are compiled by Nielsen SoundScan based on each single's weekly digital sales, which combines sales of different versions of a single for a summarized figure.

== Chart history ==
Key
†	Indicates best-charting digital song of 2009

Issue date	Song	Artist(s)	Weekly sales	Ref(s)
January 3	"Single Ladies (Put a Ring on It)"	Beyoncé	149,000	
January 10	"Just Dance"	Lady Gaga featuring Colby O'Donis	419,000	
January 17	"Just Dance"	Lady Gaga featuring Colby O'Donis	279,000	
January 24	"Just Dance"	Lady Gaga featuring Colby O'Donis	213,000	
January 31	"Just Dance"	Lady Gaga featuring Colby O'Donis	192,000	
February 7	"My Life Would Suck Without You"	Kelly Clarkson	280,000	
February 14	"My Life Would Suck Without You"	Kelly Clarkson	216,000	
February 21	"Crack a Bottle"	Eminem, Dr. Dre and 50 Cent	418,000	
February 28	"Right Round"	Flo Rida	636,000	
March 7	"Right Round"	Flo Rida	460,000	
March 14	"Right Round"	Flo Rida	334,000	
March 21	"Right Round"	Flo Rida	319,000	
March 28	"Right Round"	Flo Rida	278,000	
April 4	"Right Round"	Flo Rida	224,000	
April 11	"Poker Face"	Lady Gaga	206,000	
April 18	"Boom Boom Pow" †	The Black Eyed Peas	465,000	
April 25	"Boom Boom Pow" †	The Black Eyed Peas	335,000	
May 2	"Boom Boom Pow" †	The Black Eyed Peas	259,000	
May 9	"Boom Boom Pow" †	The Black Eyed Peas	226,000	
May 16	"Boom Boom Pow" †	The Black Eyed Peas	212,000	
May 23	"Boom Boom Pow" †	The Black Eyed Peas	215,000	
May 30	"Boom Boom Pow" †	The Black Eyed Peas	204,000	
June 6	"Boom Boom Pow" †	The Black Eyed Peas	240,000	
June 13	"Boom Boom Pow" †	The Black Eyed Peas	220,000	
June 20	"Boom Boom Pow" †	The Black Eyed Peas	205,000	
June 27	"I Gotta Feeling"	The Black Eyed Peas	249,000	
July 4	"I Gotta Feeling"	The Black Eyed Peas	232,000	
July 11	"I Gotta Feeling"	The Black Eyed Peas	203,000	
July 18	"I Gotta Feeling"	The Black Eyed Peas	215,000	
July 25	"I Gotta Feeling"	The Black Eyed Peas	205,000	
August 1	"I Gotta Feeling"	The Black Eyed Peas	219,000	
August 8	"I Gotta Feeling"	The Black Eyed Peas	223,000	
August 15	"I Gotta Feeling"	The Black Eyed Peas	215,000	
August 22	"I Gotta Feeling"	The Black Eyed Peas	197,000	
August 29	"Party in the U.S.A."	Miley Cyrus	226,000	
September 5	"Party in the U.S.A."	Miley Cyrus	211,000	
September 12	"Party in the U.S.A."	Miley Cyrus	190,000	
September 19	"Party in the U.S.A."	Miley Cyrus	179,000	
September 26	"I Gotta Feeling"	The Black Eyed Peas	179,000	
October 3	"Empire State of Mind"	Jay-Z and Alicia Keys	205,000	
October 10	"Party in the U.S.A."	Miley Cyrus	182,000	
October 17	"Party in the U.S.A."	Miley Cyrus	177,000	
October 24	"3"	Britney Spears	255,000	
October 31	"3"	Britney Spears	171,000	
November 7	"Fireflies"	Owl City	196,000	
November 14	"Fireflies"	Owl City	173,000	
November 21	"Fireflies"	Owl City	194,000	
November 28	"Fireflies"	Owl City	181,000	
December 5	"Bad Romance"	Lady Gaga	209,000	
December 12	"Bad Romance"	Lady Gaga	218,000	
December 19	"Bad Romance"	Lady Gaga	189,000	
December 26	"Bad Romance"	Lady Gaga	183,000	

== See also ==
- 2009 in music
- Hot Digital Songs

My
