= List of Billboard Hot 100 number ones of 2010 =

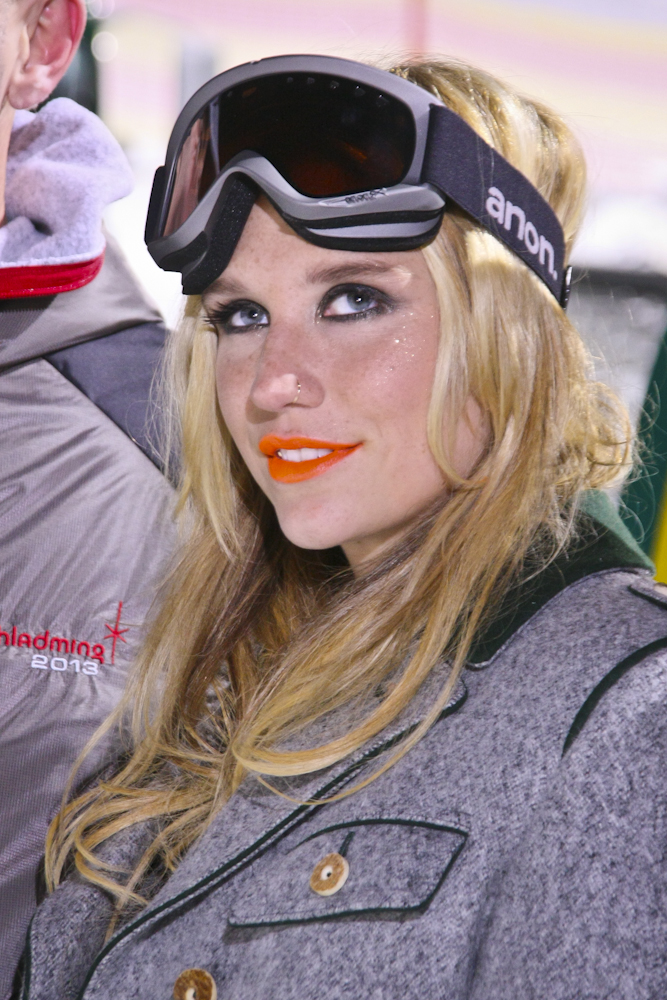
Kesha's debut single "Tik Tok" was the longest-running number-one single of the year, spending nine consecutive weeks atop the chart, the longest running debut single by a female artist since Debby Boone in 1977. The same year would spawn another chart topper with "We R Who We R".

The Billboard Hot 100 is a chart that ranks the best-performing singles of the United States. Published by Billboard magazine, the data are compiled by Nielsen SoundScan based collectively on each single's weekly physical and digital sales, and airplay. There were 17 total number-one singles in 2010.

In 2010, nine acts gained their first U.S. number-one single either as a lead or featured act: Kesha, Taio Cruz, B.o.B, Bruno Mars, will.i.am, Far East Movement, The Cataracs, Dev, and Drake.

Rihanna earned four number-one singles during the year—three as a solo artist and one as featured guest on Eminem's "Love the Way You Lie"—the first time a female artist has achieved this accomplishment in a single calendar year. She also became the female artist with the fifth most number-one singles, scoring her sixth, seventh, eighth, and ninth number-one singles during the year. Katy Perry, Eminem, Kesha, and Bruno Mars also each scored multiple number-one singles during the year, with Katy Perry scoring three consecutive number-one singles—a feat last done by R&B singer Monica eleven years earlier.

Usher became the first artist to score number-one singles in the 1990s, 2000s, and 2010s when his song "OMG" reached number one, becoming his ninth number-one single. Kesha's "Tik Tok" was the longest-running number-one single of the year with nine consecutive weeks at the top—the longest run for a debut single by a female artist since 1977. Two singles debuted at the top of the chart this year: Eminem's "Not Afraid" and Kesha's "We R Who We R", becoming the sixteenth and seventeenth singles in the chart's 52-year history to debut at number one.

== Chart history ==
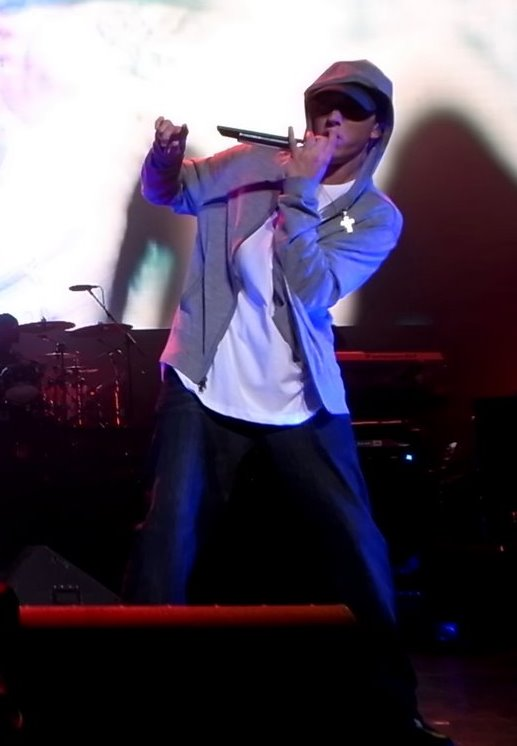
Rapper Eminem's lead-off single (from his album Recovery) "Not Afraid" became the first hip-hop song to debut at the top of the charts since Puff Daddy's "I'll Be Missing You" in 1997, the sixteenth overall in the chart's 52-year history. The same album would spawn another chart topper in 2010 with "Love The Way You Lie" (featuring Rihanna).

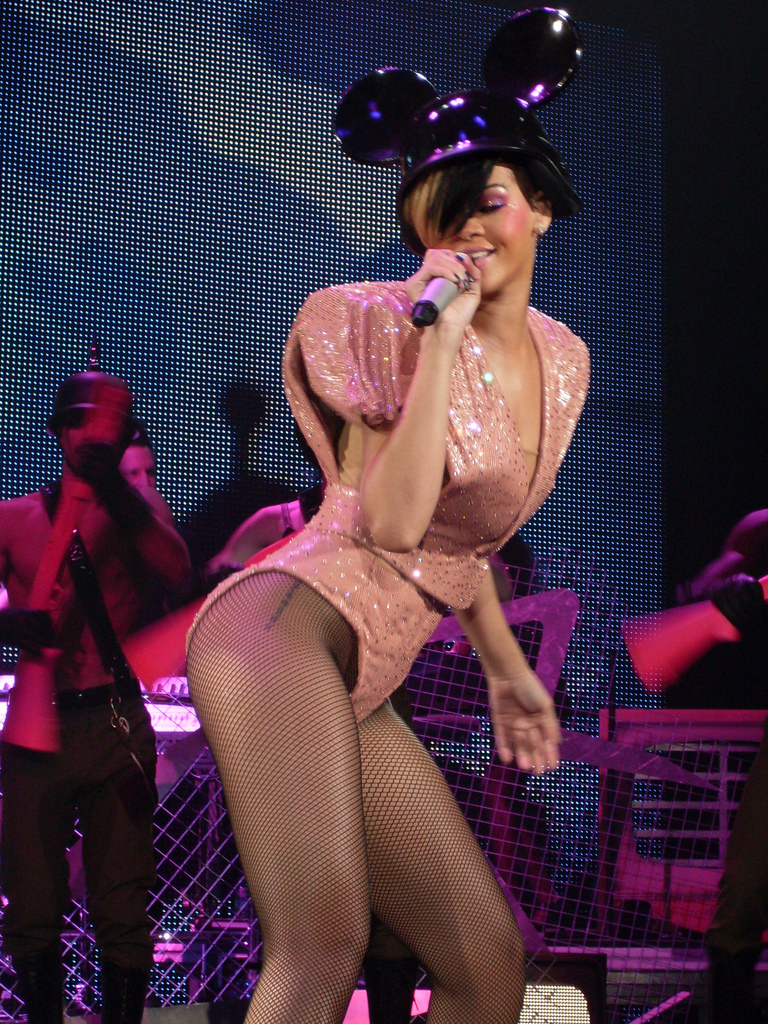
Rihanna became the first female artist in the history of the chart to have four number-one singles in a calendar year. She also became the first artist to have a lead single from an album reach number one after its second single when her "Only Girl (In the World)" reached the top of the chart two weeks after "What's My Name?" did.

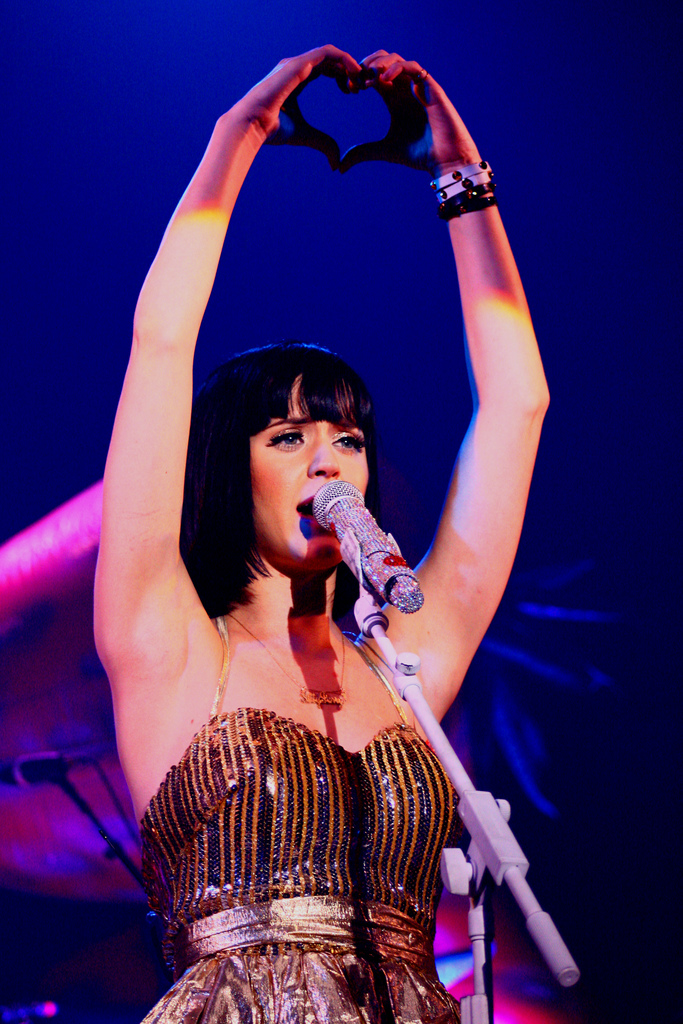
Katy Perry became the first female artist in eleven years to have three #1 singles from an album. She would go on to have five consecutive and six non-consecutive #1 singles from that album.

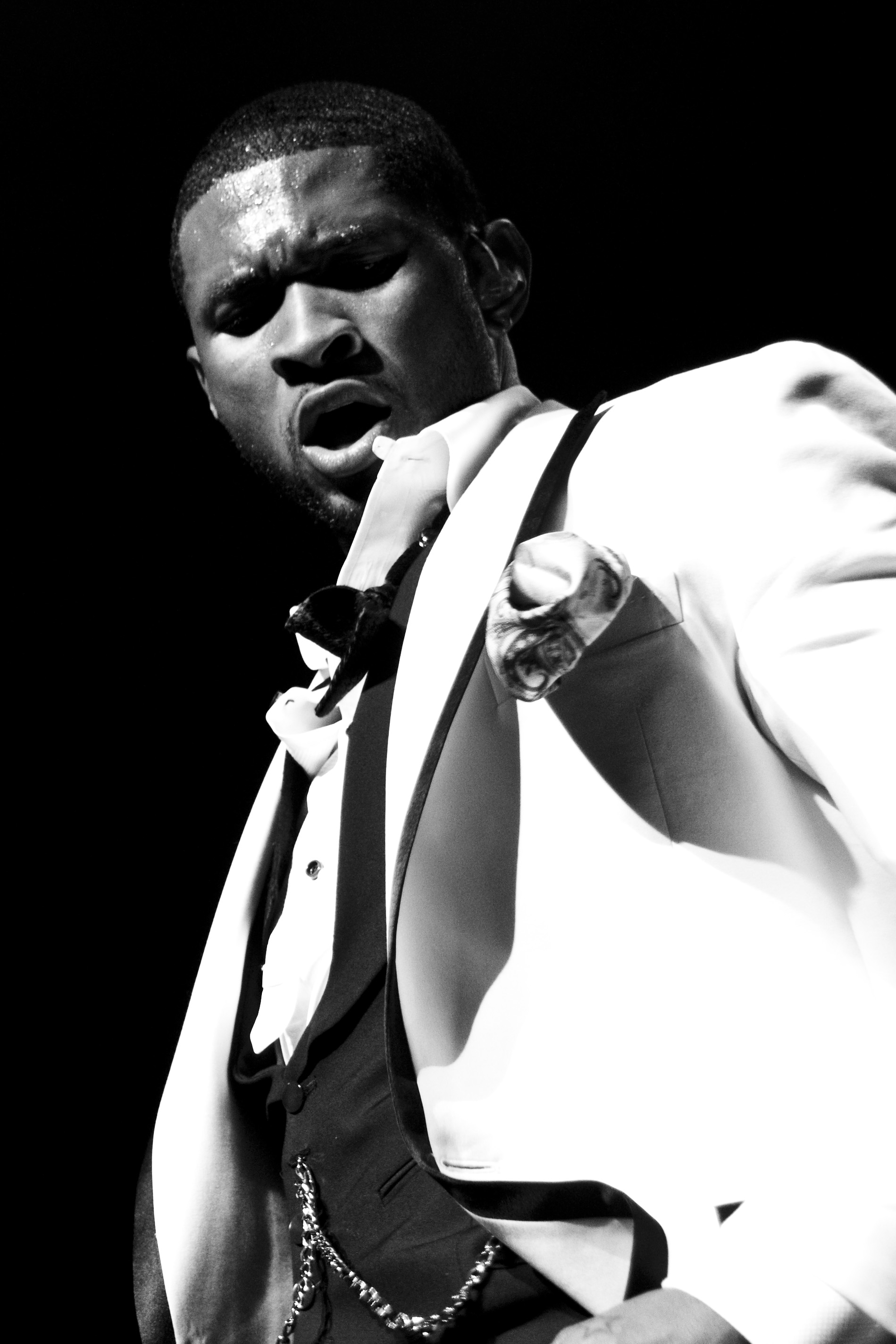
Usher became the first artist to score number-one singles in the 1990s, 2000s, and 2010s when "OMG" reached #1.

Key
†	Indicates best-performing single of 2010

No.	Issue date	Song	Artist(s)	Reference(s)
980	January 2	"Tik Tok"†	Kesha	
980	January 9	"Tik Tok"†	Kesha	
980	January 16	"Tik Tok"†	Kesha	
980	January 23	"Tik Tok"†	Kesha	
980	January 30	"Tik Tok"†	Kesha	
980	February 6	"Tik Tok"†	Kesha	
980	February 13	"Tik Tok"†	Kesha	
980	February 20	"Tik Tok"†	Kesha	
980	February 27	"Tik Tok"†	Kesha	
981	March 6	"Imma Be"	The Black Eyed Peas	
981	March 13	"Imma Be"	The Black Eyed Peas	
982	March 20	"Break Your Heart"	Taio Cruz featuring Ludacris	
983	March 27	"Rude Boy"	Rihanna	
983	April 3	"Rude Boy"	Rihanna	
983	April 10	"Rude Boy"	Rihanna	
983	April 17	"Rude Boy"	Rihanna	
983	April 24	"Rude Boy"	Rihanna	
984	May 1	"Nothin' on You"	B.o.B featuring Bruno Mars	
984	May 8	"Nothin' on You"	B.o.B featuring Bruno Mars	
985	May 15	"OMG"	Usher featuring will.i.am	
986	May 22	"Not Afraid"	Eminem	
re	May 29	"OMG"	Usher featuring will.i.am	
re	June 5	"OMG"	Usher featuring will.i.am	
re	June 12	"OMG"	Usher featuring will.i.am	
987	June 19	"California Gurls"	Katy Perry featuring Snoop Dogg	
987	June 26	"California Gurls"	Katy Perry featuring Snoop Dogg	
987	July 3	"California Gurls"	Katy Perry featuring Snoop Dogg	
987	July 10	"California Gurls"	Katy Perry featuring Snoop Dogg	
987	July 17	"California Gurls"	Katy Perry featuring Snoop Dogg	
987	July 24	"California Gurls"	Katy Perry featuring Snoop Dogg	
988	July 31	"Love the Way You Lie"	Eminem featuring Rihanna	
988	August 7	"Love the Way You Lie"	Eminem featuring Rihanna	
988	August 14	"Love the Way You Lie"	Eminem featuring Rihanna	
988	August 21	"Love the Way You Lie"	Eminem featuring Rihanna	
988	August 28	"Love the Way You Lie"	Eminem featuring Rihanna	
988	September 4	"Love the Way You Lie"	Eminem featuring Rihanna	
988	September 11	"Love the Way You Lie"	Eminem featuring Rihanna	
989	September 18	"Teenage Dream"	Katy Perry	
989	September 25	"Teenage Dream"	Katy Perry	
990	October 2	"Just the Way You Are"	Bruno Mars	
990	October 9	"Just the Way You Are"	Bruno Mars	
990	October 16	"Just the Way You Are"	Bruno Mars	
990	October 23	"Just the Way You Are"	Bruno Mars	
991	October 30	"Like a G6"	Far East Movement featuring The Cataracs and Dev	
991	November 6	"Like a G6"	Far East Movement featuring The Cataracs and Dev	
992	November 13	"We R Who We R"	Kesha	
993	November 20	"What's My Name?"	Rihanna featuring Drake	
re	November 27	"Like a G6"	Far East Movement featuring The Cataracs and Dev	
994	December 4	"Only Girl (In the World)"	Rihanna	
995	December 11	"Raise Your Glass"	Pink	
996	December 18	"Firework"	Katy Perry	
996	December 25	"Firework"	Katy Perry	

== Number-one artists ==
List of number-one artists by total weeks at number one
Position	Artist	Weeks at No. 1
1	Rihanna	14
2	Kesha	10
2	Katy Perry	10
4	Eminem	9
5	Bruno Mars	6
5	Snoop Dogg	6
7	Usher	4
7	will.i.am	4
9	Far East Movement	3
9	The Cataracts	3
9	Dev	3
12	B.o.B	2
13	Taio Cruz	1
13	Ludacris	1
13	Drake	1
13	Pink	1

== See also ==
- 2010 in music
- Billboard Year-End Hot 100 singles of 2010
- List of Billboard number-one singles
- List of Billboard Hot 100 top-ten singles in 2010
- List of Billboard Hot 100 number-one singles of the 2010s
