= List of Billboard Hot 100 number ones of 2009 =

The Billboard Hot 100 is a chart that ranks the best-performing singles of the United States. Published by Billboard magazine, the data are compiled by Nielsen SoundScan based collectively on each single's weekly physical and digital sales, and airplay. There were a total of 12 number-one singles in 2009, although 13 claimed the top spot as Beyoncé's "Single Ladies (Put a Ring on It)" reached its peak position in 2008, and thus is excluded.

In 2009, six acts achieved their first U.S. number-one single either as a lead artist or a featured guest: Lady Gaga, Colby O'Donis The Black Eyed Peas, Jay Sean, Jason Derulo, and Owl City. Jay-Z earned his first number-one single as a lead artist (with Alicia Keys) with "Empire State of Mind", after being the featured guest on three number-one singles. Lady Gaga and Black Eyed Peas each earned two number-one singles.

Black Eyed Peas broke the record for having spent the most consecutive weeks at number one (26 weeks consecutive weeks at the top) with "I Gotta Feeling" the longest-running number-one single of 2009 and of the 2000s (decade) (fourteen weeks), along with the non-consecutive Mariah Carey's "We Belong Together" in 2005, and their first number-one single "Boom Boom Pow", which topped the chart for twelve weeks.

Notable highlights of the 2009 Billboard Hot 100 issues include Kelly Clarkson's "My Life Would Suck Without You", which broke the record for the biggest leap to number one by jumping from number 97 to the number-one position. Britney Spears's "3" became the only non-'American Idol' song to debut at number one in the 2000s (decade).

== Chart history ==
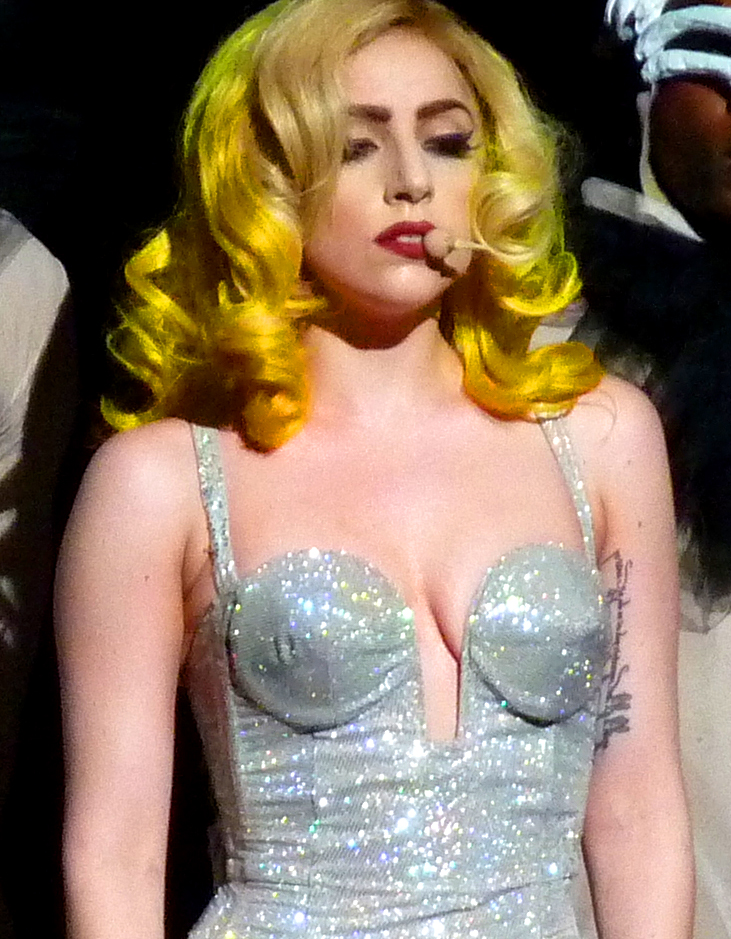
Pop singer Lady Gaga's "Just Dance" featuring Colby O'Donis and "Poker Face" made her the first artist in nine years (since Christina Aguilera) whose first two consecutive singles topped the chart.

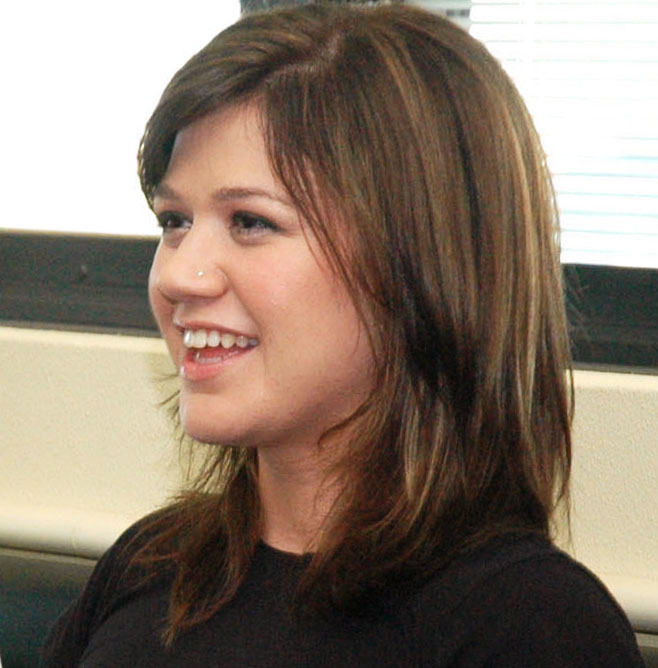
Kelly Clarkson's "My Life Would Suck Without You" went from 97 on the chart to number one, the biggest leap to the top in Hot 100 history.

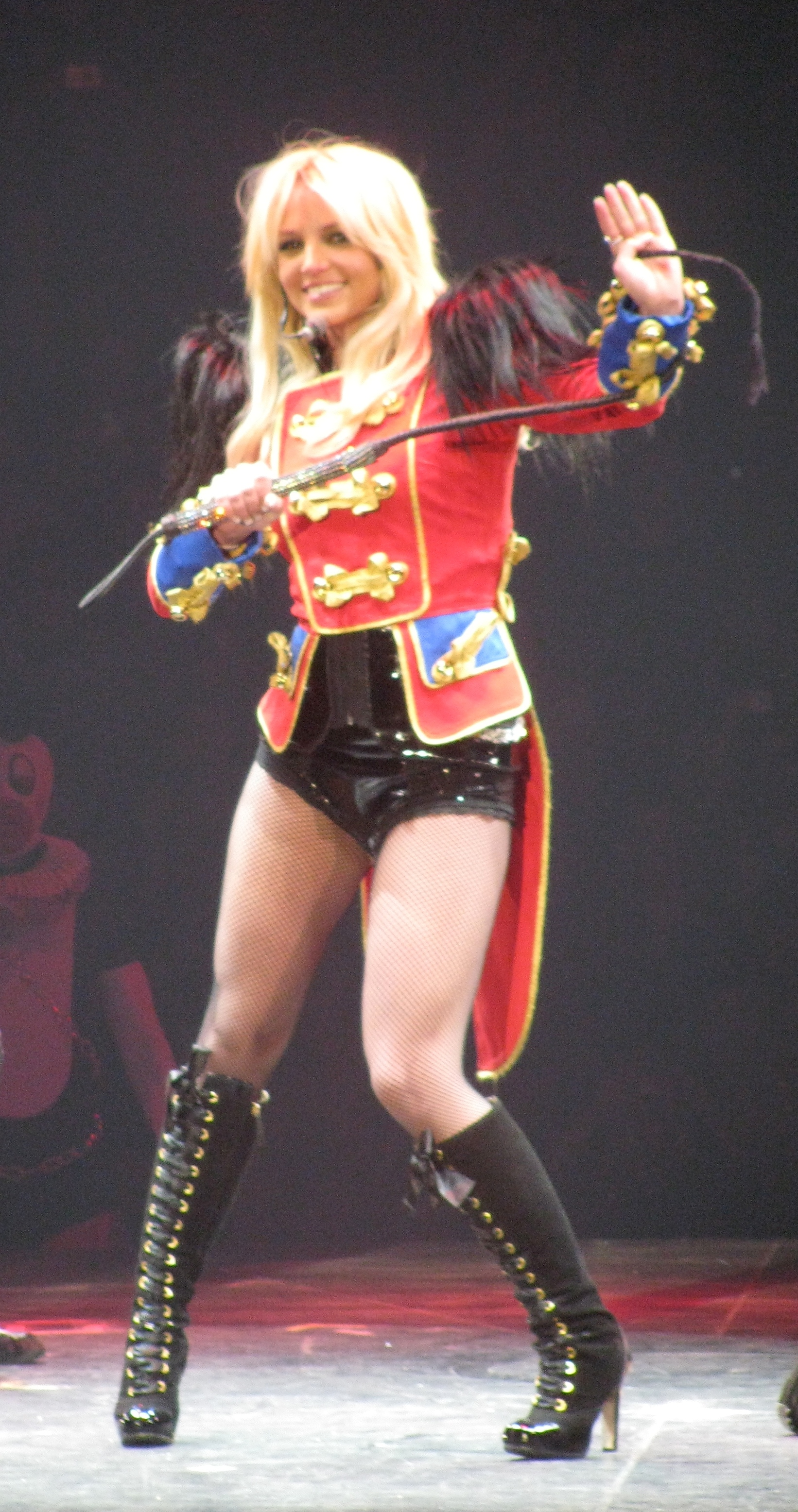
Britney Spears's "3" became the first song in three years to debut at number one and the only song not by an American Idol star to debut at number one during the 2000s decade.

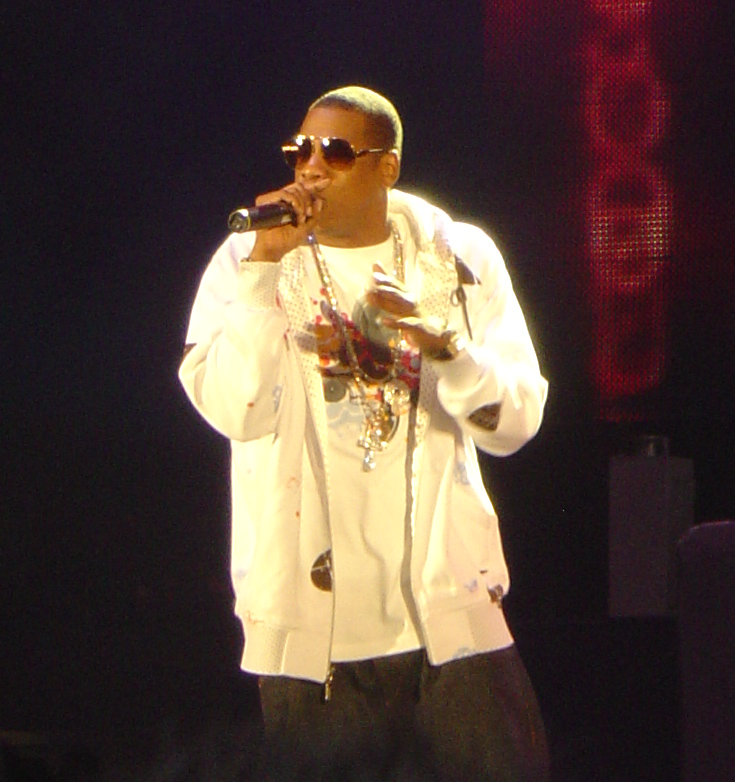
Rapper Jay-Z's "Empire State of Mind" featuring Alicia Keys marked his first number one single as a lead artist.

Key
†	Indicates best-performing single of 2009

No.	Issue date	Song	Artist(s)	Ref.
re	January 3	"Single Ladies (Put a Ring on It)"	Beyoncé	
re	January 10	"Single Ladies (Put a Ring on It)"	Beyoncé	
968	January 17	"Just Dance"	Lady Gaga featuring Colby O'Donis	
968	January 24	"Just Dance"	Lady Gaga featuring Colby O'Donis	
968	January 31	"Just Dance"	Lady Gaga featuring Colby O'Donis	
969	February 7	"My Life Would Suck Without You"	Kelly Clarkson	
969	February 14	"My Life Would Suck Without You"	Kelly Clarkson	
970	February 21	"Crack a Bottle"	Eminem, Dr. Dre and 50 Cent	
971	February 28	"Right Round"	Flo Rida	
971	March 7	"Right Round"	Flo Rida	
971	March 14	"Right Round"	Flo Rida	
971	March 21	"Right Round"	Flo Rida	
971	March 28	"Right Round"	Flo Rida	
971	April 4	"Right Round"	Flo Rida	
972	April 11	"Poker Face"	Lady Gaga	
973	April 18	"Boom Boom Pow"†	The Black Eyed Peas	
973	April 25	"Boom Boom Pow"†	The Black Eyed Peas	
973	May 2	"Boom Boom Pow"†	The Black Eyed Peas	
973	May 9	"Boom Boom Pow"†	The Black Eyed Peas	
973	May 16	"Boom Boom Pow"†	The Black Eyed Peas	
973	May 23	"Boom Boom Pow"†	The Black Eyed Peas	
973	May 30	"Boom Boom Pow"†	The Black Eyed Peas	
973	June 6	"Boom Boom Pow"†	The Black Eyed Peas	
973	June 13	"Boom Boom Pow"†	The Black Eyed Peas	
973	June 20	"Boom Boom Pow"†	The Black Eyed Peas	
973	June 27	"Boom Boom Pow"†	The Black Eyed Peas	
973	July 4	"Boom Boom Pow"†	The Black Eyed Peas	
974	July 11	"I Gotta Feeling"	The Black Eyed Peas	
974	July 18	"I Gotta Feeling"	The Black Eyed Peas	
974	July 25	"I Gotta Feeling"	The Black Eyed Peas	
974	August 1	"I Gotta Feeling"	The Black Eyed Peas	
974	August 8	"I Gotta Feeling"	The Black Eyed Peas	
974	August 15	"I Gotta Feeling"	The Black Eyed Peas	
974	August 22	"I Gotta Feeling"	The Black Eyed Peas	
974	August 29	"I Gotta Feeling"	The Black Eyed Peas	
974	September 5	"I Gotta Feeling"	The Black Eyed Peas	
974	September 12	"I Gotta Feeling"	The Black Eyed Peas	
974	September 19	"I Gotta Feeling"	The Black Eyed Peas	
974	September 26	"I Gotta Feeling"	The Black Eyed Peas	
974	October 3	"I Gotta Feeling"	The Black Eyed Peas	
974	October 10	"I Gotta Feeling"	The Black Eyed Peas	
975	October 17	"Down"	Jay Sean featuring Lil Wayne	
976	October 24	"3"	Britney Spears	
re	October 31	"Down"	Jay Sean featuring Lil Wayne	
977	November 7	"Fireflies"	Owl City	
978	November 14	"Whatcha Say"	Jason Derulo	
re	November 21	"Fireflies"	Owl City	
979	November 28	"Empire State of Mind"	Jay-Z and Alicia Keys	
979	December 5	"Empire State of Mind"	Jay-Z and Alicia Keys	
979	December 12	"Empire State of Mind"	Jay-Z and Alicia Keys	
979	December 19	"Empire State of Mind"	Jay-Z and Alicia Keys	
979	December 26	"Empire State of Mind"	Jay-Z and Alicia Keys	

== Number-one artists ==
List of number-one artists by total weeks at number one
Position	Artist	Weeks at No. 1
1	The Black Eyed Peas	26
2	Flo Rida	6
3	Jay-Z	5
3	Alicia Keys	5
5	Lady Gaga	4
6	Colby O'Donis	3
7	Beyoncé	2
7	Kelly Clarkson	2
7	Jay Sean	2
7	Lil Wayne	2
7	Owl City	2
12	Eminem	1
12	Dr. Dre	1
12	50 Cent	1
12	Britney Spears	1
12	Jason Derulo	1

== See also ==
- 2009 in music
- List of Billboard 200 number-one albums of 2009
- List of Billboard Hot 100 top 10 singles in 2009
- Billboard Year-End Hot 100 singles of 2009
- List of Billboard number-one singles
- List of Billboard Hot 100 number-one singles of the 2000s

== Additional sources ==
- Fred Bronson's Billboard Book of Number 1 Hits, 5th Edition (ISBN 0-8230-7677-6)
- Joel Whitburn's Top Pop Singles 1955-2008, 12 Edition (ISBN 0-89820-180-2)
- Joel Whitburn Presents the Billboard Hot 100 Charts: The 2000s (ISBN 0-89820-182-9)
- Additional information obtained can be verified within Billboard's online archive services and print editions of the magazine.
