= Billboard Year-End Hot 100 singles of 2010 =

Ranking of recorded music

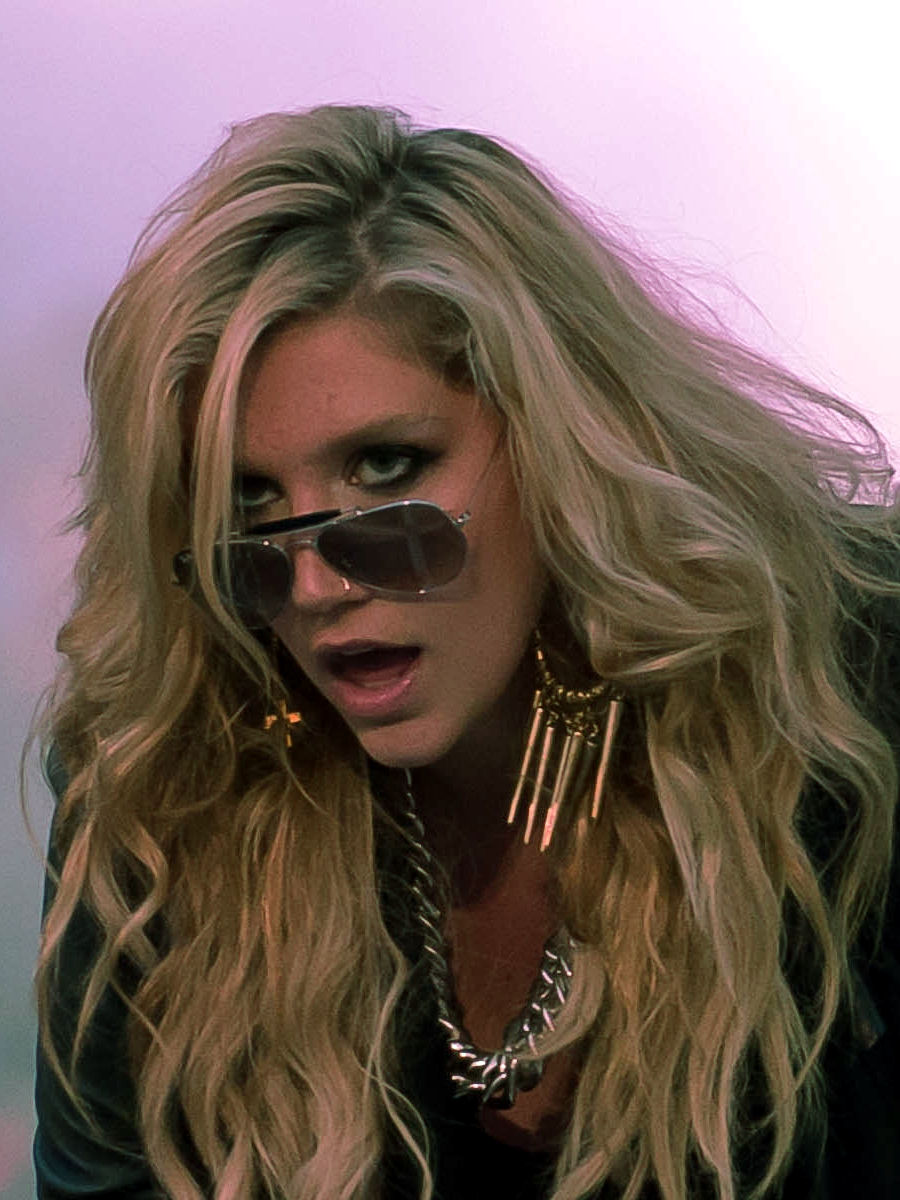
Kesha's single "Tik Tok" from her debut studio album Animal came in at number one, spending nine consecutive weeks at number 1. Three other singles from her debut also made the Year-End Hot 100, as did one by 3OH!3 on which she was featured.

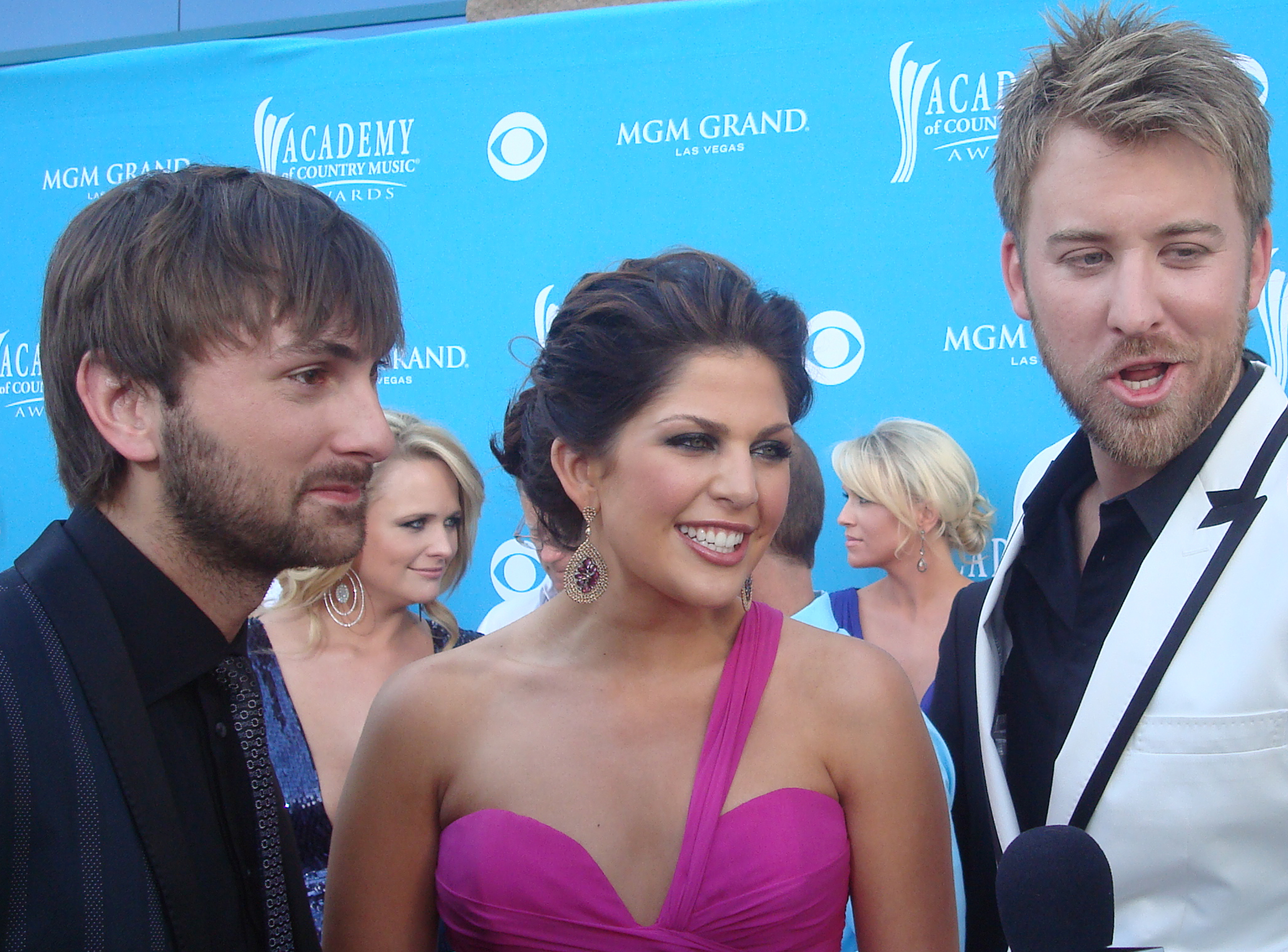
Lady Antebellum's single "Need You Now" came in at number two, the first time a country music recording has broken the top two since Faith Hill's "Breathe" ranked number one in 2000. Their single "American Honey" also made the year's top 100.

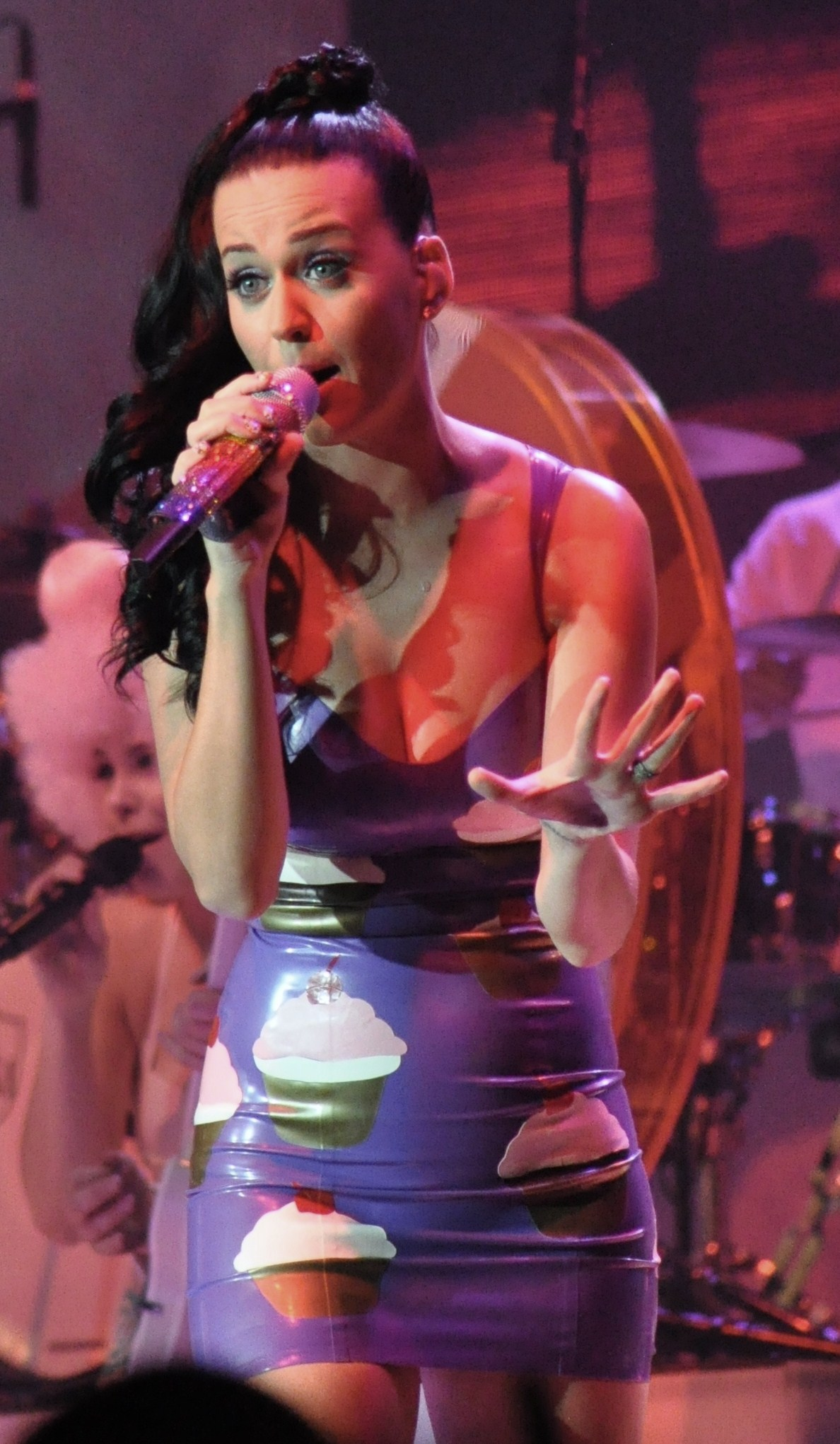
Pop singer Katy Perry has two singles within the top 20, "California Gurls" and "Teenage Dream", both of which topped the Hot 100 charts.

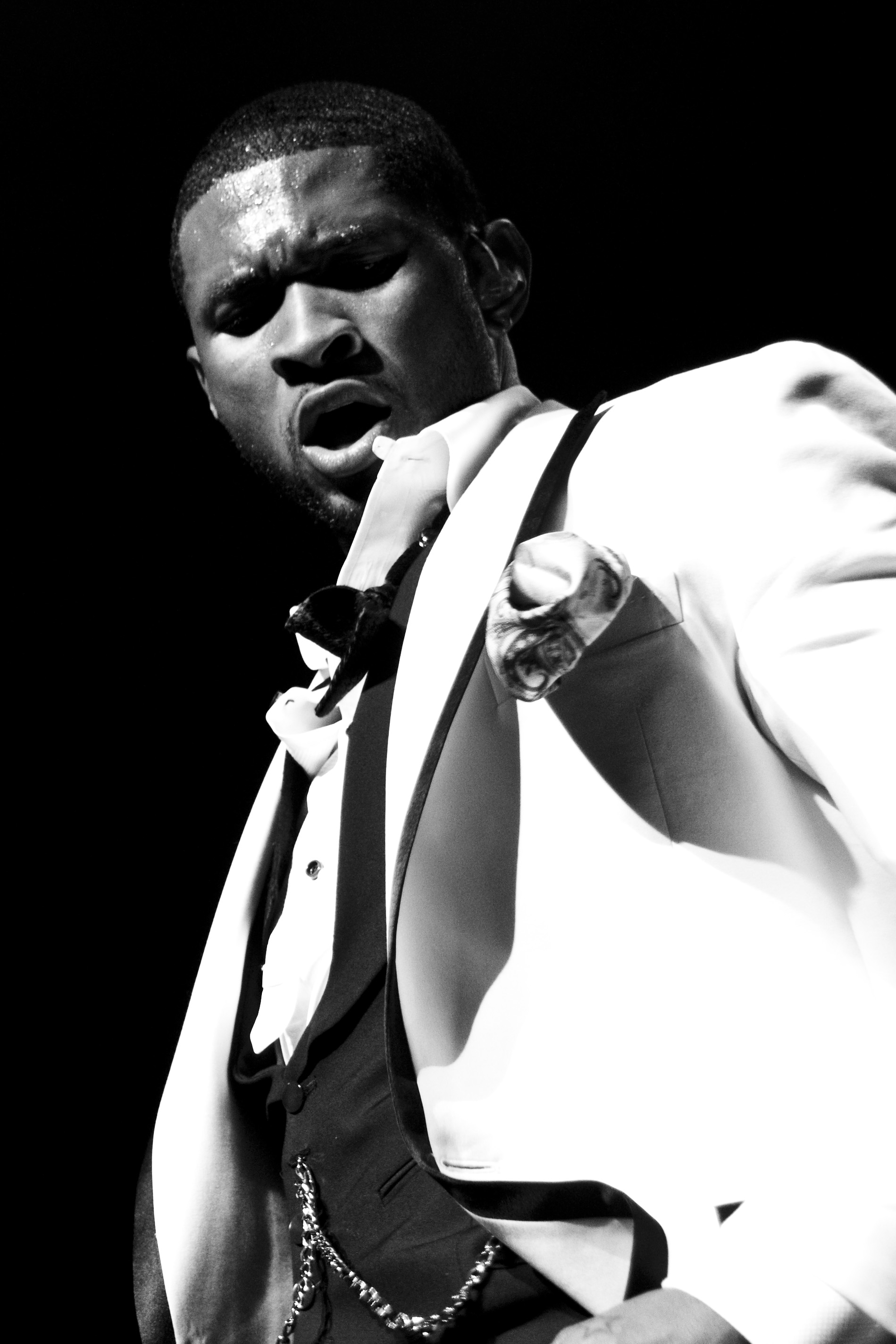
R&B singer Usher has four singles on the year's chart, two being in the top 25: "OMG" at number five and "DJ Got Us Fallin' in Love" at number 22.

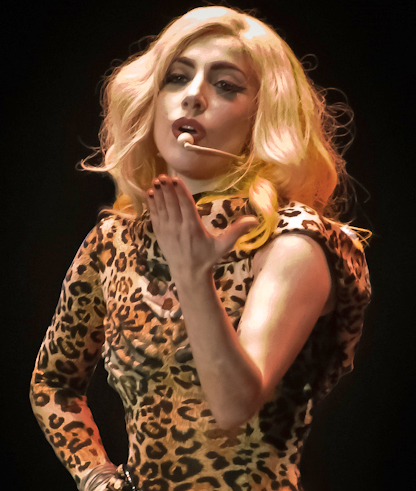
Singer Lady Gaga has four singles in this year's chart, led by "Bad Romance" at number eight.

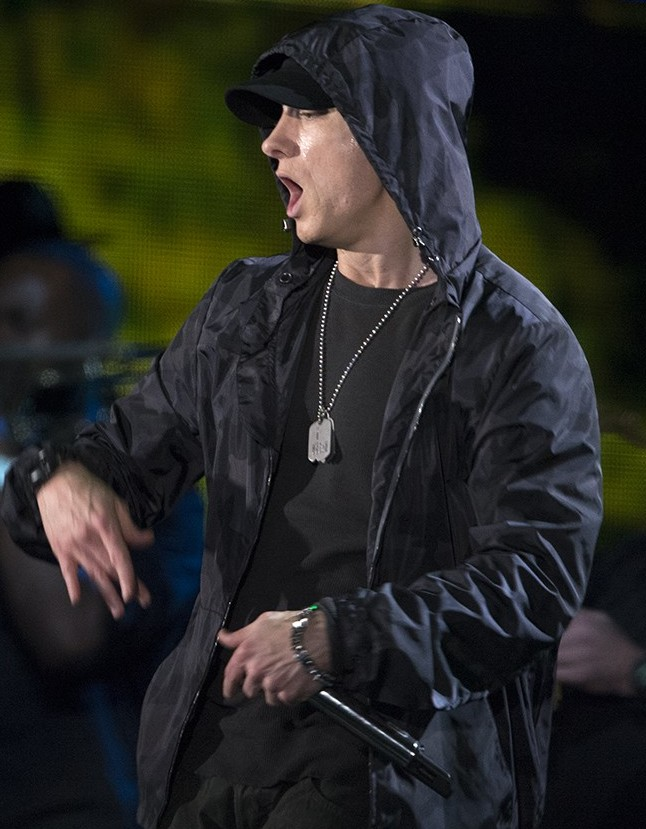
Rapper Eminem has three songs on the list with two in the top 30 which include: "Love the Way You Lie" at number 7, "Not Afraid" at number 24, and "Forever" with Drake, Kanye West, and Lil Wayne at number 71.

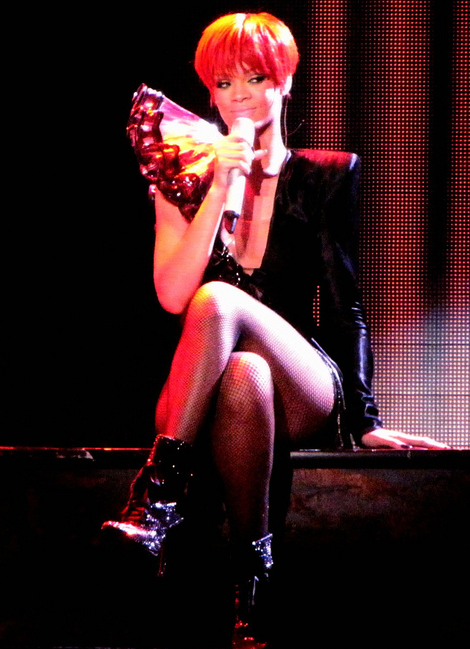
Barbadian singer Rihanna had four songs in the top 50. The highest was "Love the Way You Lie" (7), a feature with Eminem. She was also the lead artist in "Rude Boy" (15), "Only Girl (In the World)" (47), and "Hard" (49).

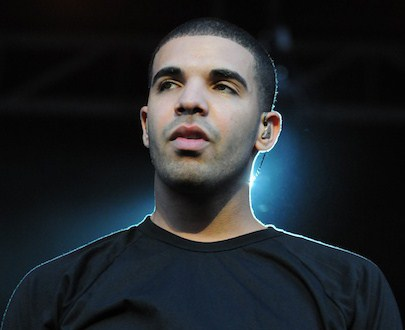
Drake has five singles on the list which include "Find Your Love" (32), "Over" (60), "Forever" (71), "Say Something" (85), and "Right Above It" (90).

Billboard publishes annual lists of songs based on chart performance over the course of a year based on Nielsen Broadcast Data Systems and SoundScan information. For 2010, the list for the top 100 Billboard Hot 100 Year-End songs was published on December 8, calculated with data from December 5, 2009 to November 27, 2010. At the number-one position was Kesha's "Tik Tok", which stayed atop the Hot 100 for nine weeks. This achievement made Kesha the first female artist in the history of the chart to top the Year-End Hot 100 with a debut single.

The list is one of five Billboard Year-End lists that featured 14 songs that appeared in the previous year (in this case 2009's) repeat onto to this list. The highest being Jay Z's "Empire State of Mind", which made it on to 2009's list at number 62 and repeat higher at number 21 in 2010's. Only four other year-end lists repeat the same feat, that being 1997, 2016, 2018 and 2022.

List of songs on Billboard's 2010 Year-End Hot 100 chart
| No. | Title | Artist(s) |
|---|---|---|
| 1 | "Tik Tok" | Kesha |
| 2 | "Need You Now" | Lady Antebellum |
| 3 | "Hey, Soul Sister" | Train |
| 4 | "California Gurls" | Katy Perry featuring Snoop Dogg |
| 5 | "OMG" | Usher featuring will.i.am |
| 6 | "Airplanes" | B.o.B featuring Hayley Williams |
| 7 | "Love the Way You Lie" | Eminem featuring Rihanna |
| 8 | "Bad Romance" | Lady Gaga |
| 9 | "Dynamite" | Taio Cruz |
| 10 | "Break Your Heart" | Taio Cruz featuring Ludacris |
| 11 | "Nothin' on You" | B.o.B featuring Bruno Mars |
| 12 | "I Like It" | Enrique Iglesias featuring Pitbull |
| 13 | "BedRock" | Young Money featuring Lloyd |
| 14 | "In My Head" | Jason Derulo |
| 15 | "Rude Boy" | Rihanna |
| 16 | "Telephone" | Lady Gaga featuring Beyoncé |
| 17 | "Teenage Dream" | Katy Perry |
| 18 | "Just the Way You Are" | Bruno Mars |
| 19 | "Cooler Than Me" | Mike Posner |
| 20 | "Imma Be" | The Black Eyed Peas |
| 21 | "Empire State of Mind" | Jay-Z featuring Alicia Keys |
| 22 | "DJ Got Us Fallin' in Love" | Usher featuring Pitbull |
| 23 | "Billionaire" | Travie McCoy featuring Bruno Mars |
| 24 | "Not Afraid" | Eminem |
| 25 | "Replay" | Iyaz |
| 26 | "Sexy Bitch" | David Guetta featuring Akon |
| 27 | "Breakeven" | The Script |
| 28 | "Your Love Is My Drug" | Kesha |
| 29 | "I Gotta Feeling" | The Black Eyed Peas |
| 30 | "Fireflies" | Owl City |
| 31 | "Say Aah" | Trey Songz featuring Fabolous |
| 32 | "Find Your Love" | Drake |
| 33 | "Alejandro" | Lady Gaga |
| 34 | "Ridin' Solo" | Jason Derulo |
| 35 | "Just a Dream" | Nelly |
| 36 | "How Low" | Ludacris |
| 37 | "Like a G6" | Far East Movement featuring The Cataracs and Dev |
| 38 | "Carry Out" | Timbaland featuring Justin Timberlake |
| 39 | "Haven't Met You Yet" | Michael Bublé |
| 40 | "Club Can't Handle Me" | Flo Rida featuring David Guetta |
| 41 | "Down" | Jay Sean featuring Lil Wayne |
| 42 | "Bulletproof" | La Roux |
| 43 | "Whatcha Say" | Jason Derulo |
| 44 | "Baby" | Justin Bieber featuring Ludacris |
| 45 | "Whataya Want from Me" | Adam Lambert |
| 46 | "Mine" | Taylor Swift |
| 47 | "Only Girl (In the World)" | Rihanna |
| 48 | "Live Like We're Dying" | Kris Allen |
| 49 | "Hard" | Rihanna featuring Jeezy |
| 50 | "Young Forever" | Jay-Z featuring Mr Hudson |
| 51 | "Blah Blah Blah" | Kesha featuring 3OH!3 |
| 52 | "Bottoms Up" | Trey Songz featuring Nicki Minaj |
| 53 | "Do You Remember" | Jay Sean featuring Sean Paul and Lil Jon |
| 54 | "All the Right Moves" | OneRepublic |
| 55 | "According to You" | Orianthi |
| 56 | "My Chick Bad" | Ludacris featuring Nicki Minaj |
| 57 | "You Belong with Me" | Taylor Swift |
| 58 | "Meet Me Halfway" | The Black Eyed Peas |
| 59 | "Take It Off" | Kesha |
| 60 | "Over" | Drake |
| 61 | "Animal" | Neon Trees |
| 62 | "Misery" | Maroon 5 |
| 63 | "Magic" | B.o.B featuring Rivers Cuomo |
| 64 | "Paparazzi" | Lady Gaga |
| 65 | "Tie Me Down" | New Boyz featuring Ray J |
| 66 | "Your Love" | Nicki Minaj |
| 67 | "Party in the U.S.A." | Miley Cyrus |
| 68 | "Deuces" | Chris Brown featuring Tyga and Kevin McCall |
| 69 | "3" | Britney Spears |
| 70 | "Impossible" | Shontelle |
| 71 | "Forever" | Drake featuring Kanye West, Lil Wayne and Eminem |
| 72 | "Two Is Better Than One" | Boys Like Girls featuring Taylor Swift |
| 73 | "My First Kiss" | 3OH!3 featuring Kesha |
| 74 | "Already Gone" | Kelly Clarkson |
| 75 | "Rock That Body" | The Black Eyed Peas |
| 76 | "Secrets" | OneRepublic |
| 77 | "Naturally" | Selena Gomez & the Scene |
| 78 | "Un-Thinkable (I'm Ready)" | Alicia Keys |
| 79 | "All I Do Is Win" | DJ Khaled featuring T-Pain, Ludacris, Snoop Dogg and Rick Ross |
| 80 | "I Made It (Cash Money Heroes)" | Kevin Rudolf featuring Birdman, Jay Sean and Lil Wayne |
| 81 | "Stuck Like Glue" | Sugarland |
| 82 | "Hey Daddy (Daddy's Home)" | Usher featuring Plies |
| 83 | "There Goes My Baby" | Usher |
| 84 | "Today Was a Fairytale" | Taylor Swift |
| 85 | "Say Something" | Timbaland featuring Drake |
| 86 | "Sweet Dreams" | Beyoncé |
| 87 | "Use Somebody" | Kings of Leon |
| 88 | "Undo It" | Carrie Underwood |
| 89 | "Eenie Meenie" | Sean Kingston and Justin Bieber |
| 90 | "Right Above It" | Lil Wayne featuring Drake |
| 91 | "The House That Built Me" | Miranda Lambert |
| 92 | "If I Die Young" | The Band Perry |
| 93 | "The Only Exception" | Paramore |
| 94 | "American Honey" | Lady Antebellum |
| 95 | "King of Anything" | Sara Bareilles |
| 96 | "Life After You" | Daughtry |
| 97 | "Smile" | Uncle Kracker |
| 98 | "Teach Me How to Dougie" | Cali Swag District |
| 99 | "Try Sleeping with a Broken Heart" | Alicia Keys |
| 100 | "Lover, Lover" | Jerrod Niemann |

== See also ==
- 2010 in American music
- Billboard Year-End Hot R&B/Hip-Hop Songs of 2010
- List of Billboard Hot 100 number-one singles of 2010
- List of Billboard Hot 100 top-ten singles in 2010
