= List of Billboard Hot 100 top-ten singles in 2009 =

This is a list of singles that have peaked in the Top 10 of the Billboard Hot 100 during 2009.

Lady Gaga scored five top ten hits during the year with "Just Dance", "Poker Face", "LoveGame", "Paparazzi", and "Bad Romance", the most among all other artists, she is also the 10th female solo artist to garner four top ten hits from a debut album.

== Top-ten singles ==
Key

- ↑ – indicates single's top 10 entry was also its Hot 100 debut
- † – indicates Best performing song of the year
- (#) – 2009 year-end top 10 single position and rank

List of Billboard Hot 100 top ten singles which peaked in 2009
Top ten entry date	Single	Artist(s)	Peak	Peak date	Weeks in top ten	References
Singles from 2008
October 4	"Love Story" (#5)	Taylor Swift	4	January 17	13	
November 22	"Heartless" (#9) ↑	Kanye West	2	February 21	16	
December 6	"Just Dance" (#3)	Lady Gaga featuring Colby O'Donis	1	January 17	19	
Singles from 2009
January 24	"Gives You Hell" (#10)	The All-American Rejects	4	March 7	14	
February 7	"My Life Would Suck Without You"	Kelly Clarkson	1	February 7	10	
February 7	"You Found Me"	The Fray	7	February 14	6	
February 21	"Crack a Bottle"	Eminem featuring Dr. Dre and 50 Cent	1	February 21	4	
February 21	"Dead and Gone"	T.I. featuring Justin Timberlake	2	February 28	13	
February 28	"Poker Face" (#2)	Lady Gaga	1	April 11	18	
February 28	"Right Round" (#6)	Flo Rida	1	February 28	13	
March 7	"Kiss Me Thru the Phone"	Soulja Boy Tell 'Em featuring Sammie	3	April 4	13	
March 21	"The Climb" ↑	Miley Cyrus	4	May 2	8	
March 21	"Blame It"	Jamie Foxx featuring T-Pain	2	May 16	14	
April 4	"I Told You So"	Carrie Underwood featuring Randy Travis	9	April 4	1	
April 11	"Love Sex Magic"	Ciara featuring Justin Timberlake	10	April 11	1	
April 18	"Boom Boom Pow" † (#1)	The Black Eyed Peas	1	April 18	19	
April 18	"Day 'n' Nite"	Kid Cudi	3	May 9	9	
May 2	"We Made You" ↑	Eminem	9	May 2	1	
May 9	"Halo"	Beyoncé	5	May 23	8	
May 9	"Sugar"	Flo Rida featuring Wynter	5	May 16	4	
May 16	"Don't Trust Me"	3OH!3	7	May 30	3	
May 30	"Birthday Sex"	Jeremih	4	June 13	10	
May 30	"I Know You Want Me (Calle Ocho)"	Pitbull	2	June 20	10	
June 6	"Don't Stop Believin'" ↑	Glee Cast	4	June 6	1	
June 6	"New Divide" ↑	Linkin Park	6	June 6	3	
June 6	"Waking Up in Vegas"	Katy Perry	9	August 8	4	
June 13	"Fire Burning"	Sean Kingston	5	July 25	11	
June 13	"Knock You Down"	Keri Hilson featuring Kanye West and Ne-Yo	3	June 20	14	
June 13	"LoveGame"	Lady Gaga	5	June 27	10	
June 20	"Second Chance"	Shinedown	7	June 20	3	
June 27	"I Gotta Feeling" (#4) ↑	The Black Eyed Peas	1	July 11	22	
July 4	"Best I Ever Had"	Drake	2	July 25	12	
July 4	"Every Girl"	Young Money	10	July 4	1	
July 18	"You Belong With Me"	Taylor Swift	2	August 22	16	
July 25	"He Could Be the One" ↑	Hannah Montana	10	July 25	1	
August 8	"Battlefield"	Jordin Sparks	10	August 8	1	
August 8	"Use Somebody"	Kings of Leon	4	September 12	12	
August 15	"Down"	Jay Sean featuring Lil Wayne	1	October 17	24	
August 15	"Good Girls Go Bad"	Cobra Starship featuring Leighton Meester	7	August 22	6	
August 22	"Hotel Room Service"	Pitbull	8	September 19	6	
August 29	"Party in the U.S.A." ↑	Miley Cyrus	2	August 29	16	
August 29	"Run This Town"	Jay-Z featuring Rihanna and Kanye West	2	October 3	12	
September 19	"Obsessed"	Mariah Carey	7	September 19	4	
September 19	"Whatcha Say"	Jason Derulo	1	November 14	18	
October 3	"Forever" ↑	Drake featuring Kanye West, Lil Wayne and Eminem	8	October 3	1	
October 3	"Empire State of Mind"	Jay-Z featuring Alicia Keys	1	November 28	16	
October 3	"Paparazzi"	Lady Gaga	6	October 17	10	
October 24	"3" ↑	Britney Spears	1	October 24	11	
October 24	"Fireflies"	Owl City	1	November 7	15	
October 31	"Meet Me Halfway"	The Black Eyed Peas	7	November 7	6	
November 7	"Sweet Dreams"	Beyoncé	10	November 7	2	
November 14	"Bad Romance" ↑	Lady Gaga	2	December 5	17	
November 14	"Jump Then Fall" ↑	Taylor Swift	10	November 14	1	
November 21	"Russian Roulette"	Rihanna	9	November 21	1	

=== 2008 peaks ===
List of Billboard Hot 100 top ten singles in 2009 which peaked in 2008
Top ten entry date	Single	Artist(s)	Peak	Peak date	Weeks in top ten
September 6	"Whatever You Like"	T.I.	1	September 6	19
September 13	"I'm Yours" (#7)	Jason Mraz	6	September 20	13
October 4	"Love Lockdown" ↑	Kanye West	3	October 4	9
October 4	"Hot n Cold"	Katy Perry	3	November 22	18
October 18	"Let It Rock"	Kevin Rudolf featuring Lil Wayne	5	October 18	10
October 18	"Live Your Life"	T.I. featuring Rihanna	1	October 18	18
October 25	"Womanizer"	Britney Spears	1	October 25	13
November 8	"If I Were a Boy"	Beyoncé	3	November 8	10
December 6	"Single Ladies (Put a Ring on It)" (#8)	Beyoncé	1	December 13	13
December 20	"Circus" ↑	Britney Spears	3	December 20	5

=== 2010 peaks ===
List of Billboard Hot 100 top ten singles in 2009 which peaked in 2010
Top ten entry date	Single	Artist(s)	Peak	Peak date	Weeks in top ten
November 21	"Replay"	Iyaz	2	January 9	14
November 28	"Need You Now"	Lady Antebellum	2	March 20	16
November 28	"Tik Tok"	Kesha	1	January 2	20
December 5	"Sexy Bitch"	David Guetta featuring Akon	5	February 13	13

== Artists with most top-ten songs ==
List of artists by total songs peaking in the top-ten
Artist	Numbers of songs
Kanye West	5
Lady Gaga	5
Beyoncé	4
The Black Eyed Peas	3
Britney Spears	3
Eminem	3
Lil Wayne	3
Miley Cyrus/Hannah Montana	3
Rihanna	3
Taylor Swift	3
T.I.	3
Drake	2
Flo Rida	2
Jay-Z	2
Justin Timberlake	2
Pitbull	2

== See also ==
- 2009 in music
- List of Billboard Hot 100 number ones of 2009
- Billboard Year-End Hot 100 singles of 2009
