= Empire State of Mind =

2009 single by Jay-Z and Alicia Keys

Single by Jay-Z and Alicia Keys

from the album The Blueprint 3
- Released: September 1, 2009
- Recorded: 2009
- Studio: Roc the Mic; Oven (New York)
- Genre: Hip-hop; pop rap
- Length: 4:36
- Label: Roc Nation; Atlantic
- Songwriters: Shawn Carter; Alexander Shuckburgh; Janet Sewell-Ulepic; Angela Hunte; Alicia Keys; Sylvia Robinson; Bert Keyes
- Producers: Al Shux; Janet Sewell-Ulepic; Angela Hunte

Jay-Z singles chronology
"Run This Town" (2009)	"Empire State of Mind" (2009)	"On to the Next One" (2009)

Alicia Keys singles chronology
"Another Way to Die" (2008)	"Empire State of Mind" (2009)	"Doesn't Mean Anything" (2009)

Music video
- "Empire State of Mind" on YouTube

"Empire State of Mind" is a song recorded by American rapper Jay-Z and American singer-songwriter Alicia Keys, for the former's eleventh studio album The Blueprint 3 (2009). Produced by Al Shux, the song features a music sample of "Love on a Two-Way Street" performed by the Moments. Angela Hunte and Janet Sewell-Ulepic originally wrote it as a tribute to their hometown, New York City. The following month, they submitted it to Roc Nation, whose reviews were discouraging. They later took the suggestion of an EMI Music Publishing associate and resubmitted it to Jay-Z, who kept the "New York" singing part on the hook, changed the verses, and recorded it. The song's title, similar to "New York State of Mind" by Billy Joel and "N.Y. State of Mind" by Nas, is a play on and tribute to New York State's nickname "Empire State". "Empire State of Mind" was released as the third single from The Blueprint 3 on September 1, 2009, by Roc Nation and Atlantic Records.

The song originally featured Hunte on the hook, but when Hunte and Sewell-Ulepic were asked if they thought anyone else would be more appropriate for the chorus, Hunte suggested Keys. Fellow New York-based musician Mary J. Blige was also considered, but Jay-Z chose Keys after hearing the song's piano loop. "Empire State of Mind" contains songwriting contributions from Keys and Shux. Critics described the song as an "orchestral rap ballad" with "crashing piano chords" and a "soaring" hook. It references several locations in New York and its famous residents, while describing the city's essence.

"Empire State of Mind" was included in multiple critics' top 10 list of the best songs of 2009, including Rolling Stone magazine and The New York Times. It was also nominated for three Grammy Awards, winning Best Rap Song and Best Rap/Sung Collaboration. The song achieved commercial success worldwide. It topped the Billboard Hot 100 in the US for five consecutive weeks, becoming Jay-Z's first number-one single on the chart as a lead artist. It also peaked within the top 10 in other countries, including the United Kingdom, Canada, Australia, France, Italy and Sweden. It appeared in 2009 year-end charts in Italy, Australia and the US, where it was also the last number one hit of the 2000s. As of July 2024, the single has sold over 10 million units in the United States.

In the music video, which is primarily in black-and-white, Jay-Z and Keys are shown performing the song in various locations in New York. "Empire State of Mind" has been performed by Jay-Z and Keys multiple times, including during the 2009 MTV Video Music Awards and the American Music Awards of 2009. Usually, when the duo performs the song, an overhead screen shows images of places in New York. Keys recorded a sequel entitled "Empire State of Mind (Part II) Broken Down", which is featured on her fourth studio album The Element of Freedom (2009). Her version was positively received by critics, reached the Top 10 in the UK, the Netherlands and Ireland charts, and peaked at number 55 on the Billboard Hot 100 without an official release. Keys said that she chose to record her own version of "Empire State of Mind" to express her personal feelings about New York.

== Background and writing ==
"Empire State of Mind" was originally written by Brooklyn-native singer, songwriter and producer Angela Hunte and writing partner Janet "Jnay" Sewell-Ulepic. Hunte grew up in the same building where Jay-Z lived—560 State Street, an address which is mentioned in the song. The track's creation was inspired during an overseas trip Hunte and Sewell-Ulepic made to London in February 2009 when they were both feeling homesick. Hunte was ill during that summer, while Sewell-Ulepic's mother was ill. Hunte recalled,

"We said to ourselves, 'we complain so much about New York — about the busy streets, about the crowds and the pushing, about the subway system — but I would trade that for anything right now.' Before we left the hotel that night, we knew we would write a song about our city."

They sent it to the Roc Nation music label the following month in the hope that Jay-Z would like it and record it. When they received a negative response on the track, they were convinced it would never be recorded. However, in the summer of the same year, EMI Music Publishing's (EMI) Jon "Big Jon" Platt heard the track at a barbecue and fell in love with it, believing that "it would be perfect for Jay-Z". Hunte and Sewell-Ulepic were hesitant, however, as they had already sent the track for consideration and were unsuccessful. According to Hunte, when a Notorious B.I.G. figure she kept – which had never moved before regardless of how loud they played music – fell over as they played the track for Platt, she considered it an omen. She commented, "We all just looked at each other like, 'If Biggie approves, then, send it to Jay'". The next day, Platt sent it to Jay-Z, who "loved it and recorded it that night". "We were just so happy he wanted to honor our work and our production", Hunte recalled;

"Two female producers/writers, and for him as a rapper to take our song—that's not a combination you see a lot. For him to be so open-minded about it, we just couldn't be any more grateful and thankful."

Originally written to be sung, the track's verses were rewritten by Jay-Z, inspired by the original lyrics, leaving Hunte on the song's hook. However, when Hunte and Sewell-Ulepic were asked if they thought someone else would be more appropriate for the chorus, Hunte suggested R&B and soul artist Alicia Keys. Hunte said, "She's never done a record with him and she also has my same vocal tone. She made the song sound so close to the original, She just nailed it and brought it home. It was a great choice." Keys also wrote "Empire State of Mind"'s new bridge.

Jay-Z stated in an interview that after hearing the track's piano loops, he immediately thought of Keys and wanted her to be featured in the song. Jay-Z said that Mary J. Blige was initially considered for Keys' part on "Empire State of Mind", and he was "two seconds away" from asking Blige to appear on the record's chorus, which would have been a safe move. However, the combination of Keys' sound and piano talent had struck a chord with Jay-Z. Keys said of featuring on the song:

"There was a first phone call, and Jay hit me up like, 'I feel like I have this record that's going to be the anthem of New York. The piano, the way the style [is], the whole flow, and it couldn't be the anthem of New York without you.' Obviously, I'm very grateful to him for reaching out to me and for that type of ability to represent my hometown, like, that was crazy. So we went to the studio. I went to the studio, and [...] I fell in love [with the track] from the jump."

In December 2009 Hunte, who would not reveal many details, said the original version of "Empire State of Mind" would one day be released, adding, "The original is so powerful it's only a matter of time till you hear it down the line".

== Composition and recording ==
"Empire State of Mind"
A sample of "Empire State of Mind" featuring Jay-Z rapping the last part of the second verse, and Alicia Keys singing the chorus.

"Empire State of Mind" is a hip-hop song that features rap verses from Jay-Z and vocals during the song's chorus from Keys. The piano component that runs throughout the song contains a sample of the 1970 single "Love on a Two-Way Street", written by Burt Keyes and Sylvia Robinson, performed by The Moments. Stephen Dalton of The Times described the song as an "orchestral rap ballad".

The song is played at a moderate tempo of 84 beats per minute and is written in the key of F♯ major. It has a sequence of F♯–C♯/B–B–F♯ as its chord progression, throughout the single Keys' vocal range changes from the register of A♯_{3} to C♯_{5}.

The song opens with lyrics referencing locations in New York City, and name-checks notable neighborhoods and captures the city's essence; from attending Knicks basketball games to its famous residents. Drug dealing references, "N-words", and profanity are also present throughout the song. Mariel Concepcion of Billboard magazine wrote that "Jay-Z gives a nod to his hometown over a simple piano pattern".

While recording the song, Keys said she wanted to make sure she got the hook right explaining, "I did try it a couple of times, but it was more about capturing the kind of grand feeling of it. With the way I sang it the first time, I was actually kind of sick, and I knew that he needed the record, so I was like, 'Let me get to it.'" Keys had been congested when she first recorded and redid the vocals after Jay-Z wasn't satisfied with her original take. "I came back and revisited it so that it could be what it is now", Keys added. "So it actually took a couple of times, but every time, the energy was just so high."

== Critical reception ==
=== Reviews ===
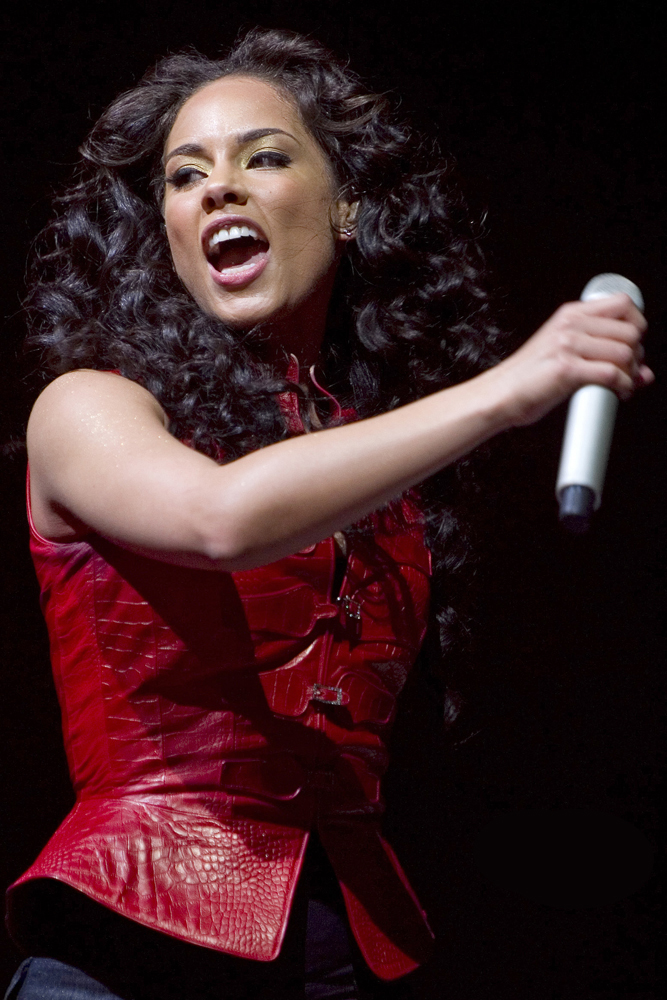
Music critics commended Alicia Keys for her chorus line.

"Empire State of Mind" received widespread acclaim from music critics, with many praising Keys' vocal performance. Jon Bush of AllMusic listed the song as being a highlight from The Blueprint 3, commenting that it is Jay-Z's "king of crossovers ... a New York flag-waver with plenty of landmark name-dropping that turns into a great anthem with help on the chorus from Alicia Keys". Pete Cashmore of NME described Alicia Keys's cameo as "lusty bellowing", embellishing the "crashing piano chords". Martin Andrew of PopMatters called the song "yet another chance" for Jay-Z to show his respect to New York, but commented that it "remains interesting thanks to a fantastic Al Shux beat and celebratory hook from Alicia Keys." Jayson Rodriguez of MTV News said that Keys "croons" on the track's chorus line, "I'm from Neeeeww Yooooork/These streets will make you feel brand-new/Bright lights will inspire you."

USA Today's Steve Jones perceived a maturity by Jay-Z in the song, writing that "The upper-crust landmarks he now references are a far cry from the grimy Marcy Projects sights that he once detailed, something that perhaps is to be expected from the self-described 'new Sinatra'." The Daily Telegraph described the song's modern sound as "anthemic club pop" on which Keys produces a "singalong" chorus. Shannon Barbour of About.com called "Empire State of Mind" the album's apex, commending Keys for the "standout" aspect of the song, her "excellent display of some unusually strong vocals". Slant Magazine writer William McBee described it as a "glittering paean to the Big Apple" with Keys "soaring skyscraper-level on the hook and Jay putting on for his city." Raju Mudhar of the Toronto Star remarked "who can argue?" with the lyrics "I'm the new Sinatra/And since I made it here/I can make it anywhere/Yeah they love me everywhere", adding that Jay-Z is "one of those waffling retirees, but the man is a living hip hop legend". Los Angeles Times writer Greg Kot commended Jay-Z for his ability to perform with cameos and called "Run This Town" and "Empire State of Mind" "the sound of Jay-Z cruising for pop hits."

IGN music reviewer Chris Carle described Keys as having "soaring vocals" in the song. New York Post writer Ryan Brockington called "Empire State of Mind" his favorite song from The Blueprint 3, and Tyler Gray from the same publication said "Empire State of Mind" was the "most soulful" song on the album. Francois Marchand of the Vancouver Sun called the song "shiver-inducing". The Times writer Stephen Dalton called the track a "heartfelt love letter to New York City", with Jay-Z playing the "hip-hop Sinatra" over Keys' "luscious" chorus, and The Guardian's Alexis Petridis described its chorus as "incredible, breezy pop". Killan Fox of the same publication felt that the track was a "terrific homage" to New York and listed the song as being one of the "really good tracks" on The Blueprint 3. Writing in Rolling Stone, Jody Rosen called it a "pallid New York shout-out". Pitchfork's Ian Cohen stated that "the piledriver hooks of "Run This Town" and "Empire State of Mind" are content to annoy their way to ubiquity".

=== Rankings and honors ===
"Empire State of Mind" has been included in multiple music critics list for the best songs of 2009. The single was ranked the 8th best song of 2009 by MTV, the second-best song of 2009 by Rolling Stone magazine, and was voted the best single of 2009 by The Village Voice's 37th annual Pazz & Jop critics' poll. On the 2010 Pazz & Jop list, the song was, along with a number of other songs, ranked at 226. Jon Pareles of The New York Times placed "Empire State of Mind" at number three on his list of the top songs of 2009, and Pitchfork also ranked it at number 44 on its The Top 100 Tracks of 2009 list. Entertainment Weekly placed it number one on its list of "The 10 Best Singles of 2009". "Empire State of Mind" was placed at number six on NME's Albums and Tracks of the Year, 2009 list. It was placed at number nine on PopMatters's list of "The Best Singles of 2009" and at number twelve on Consequence of Sound's list of "The Top 50 Songs of '09". The song appears at number one on Rap-Up's list of the 25 best songs of 2009. It was ranked at number 14 the 2009 Pitchfork's "Song of the Year" Reader's Poll. The New York Daily News included it at number ten on its list of "The 10 best songs about New York".

"Empire State of Mind" was nominated for three Grammy Awards including Record of the Year. At the 53rd Grammy Awards ceremony, the song won Best Rap/Sung Collaboration and Best Rap Song. In February 2011, Billboard placed the song at number 15 on its list of "The 40 Biggest Duets Of All Time" and in September 2011, the song was placed at number eight by VH1 on its list for the 100 Greatest Songs of the '00s. In October 2011, NME placed it at number 13 on its list "150 Best Tracks of the Past 15 Years". Complex placed the song at number nine on its list of "The 100 Best Jay-Z Songs" and on number four on its list of "The 25 Best Alicia Keys Songs", noting that the song "has replaced Frank Sinatra's "New York, New York" as the city's go-to anthem, and remains one of Keys' greatest contributions to pop culture". In July 2013, PopMatters placed the song at number six on its list of "The Top 20 Jay-Z Songs to Date", remarking that "Alicia Keys' voice soars through the city night as Hov offers up his typical wit and, in this case, New York authenticity", making the song become "the unofficial anthem of the most celebrated city in the world".

Jay-Z, a long-time fan of the New York Yankees, said that he was elated that his songs, namely "Empire State of Mind" and "Run This Town", had been played during different Yankee player's batting at home games in the 2009 World Series. New York Mayor Michael Bloomberg commented that "Empire State of Mind" had become "one of the newest anthems of the Yankees". In Summer 2012, an advertisement for New York State touting its economic comeback features the piano loop of this song along with Key's voice singing "New York". In summer of 2010, the New York Racing Association (NYRA) replaced Sinatra's "New York, New York" with "Empire State of Mind" as the opening song at the 142nd running of the Belmont Stakes. A NYRA official declared the song the "quintessential 21st century theme song for New York City". In June 2026, CBS News included the song in its list of the 250 essential American songs of the past 250 years.

== Commercial performance ==
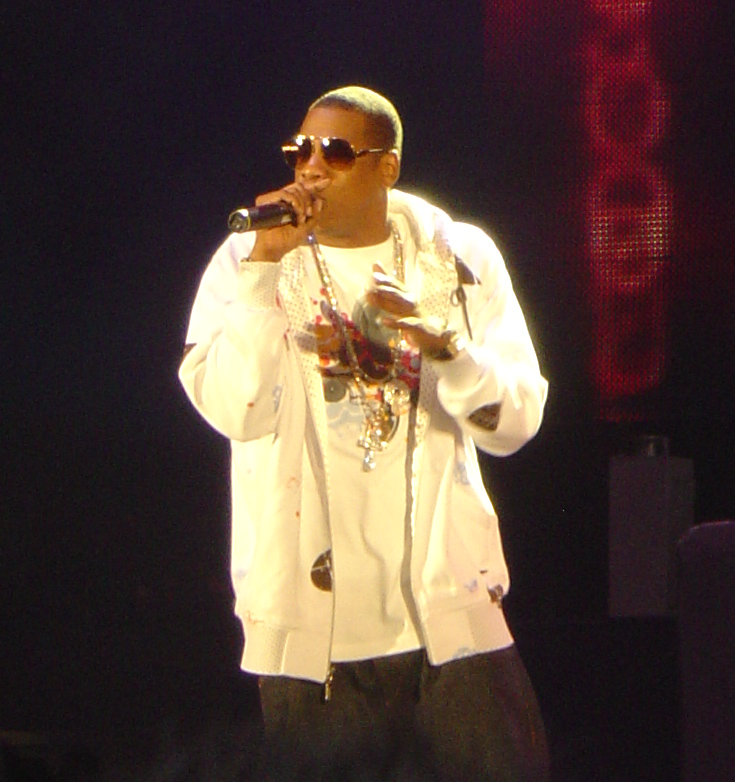
"Empire State of Mind" gave Jay-Z his first number one single on the Billboard Hot 100 as a lead artist.

"Empire State of Mind" achieved commercial success worldwide. In the United States the track peaked at number one on the Billboard Hot 100 for five consecutive weeks, from November 28 to December 26, replacing "Fireflies" by Owl City for the top position and giving Jay-Z his first number one single on that chart as a lead artist in his 14-year career. The song, which was both artists' fourth number one entry on the chart, became the first Billboard Hot 100 number one single to reference New York in its title. Moreover, it was included in Billboard's year-end music charts for 2009 at number 62 and was the last number one single for the 2000s (decade). According to Billboard magazine, the song was the 15th biggest hit by two recording artists for all time.

The single sold 205,000 digital copies in the US in its opening week and its highest week sale was of 360,000 in December 2009. "Empire State of Mind" also peaked at number one on the Billboard component chart for the sales of legal digital downloads on October 3, 2009, and topped the Billboard component chart for singles with the most radio airplay throughout the country for eight consecutive weeks from November 28 to January 23, 2010. The track also peaked at the top position on the R&B/Hip-Hop songs chart for three consecutive weeks, as well as topping the Billboard Rap Songs chart for nine consecutive weeks. After five months of release "Empire State of Mind" was certified three times platinum by the Recording Industry Association of America (RIAA) for the shipment of over 3,000,000 units in the US. By August 2012, the single reached its 5 millionth sales mark in the US. As of June 2014, the song has sold 5,513,000 copies in the US.

In the United Kingdom, the track debuted at number fifteen and, in the two succeeding weeks, peaked at number two. In May 2012, "Empire State of Mind" ranked as the 76th biggest selling single of the 21st century in the United Kingdom, as published by the Official Charts Company. The song peaked at number three on the Canadian Hot 100 and was listed as being the top digital gainer on December 12. The song peaked at number four in Australia, and was certified gold by the Australian Recording Industry Association (ARIA) for the shipment of 35,000 units in the country. "Empire State of Mind" was also included in Australia's 2009 year-end music chart at number 64. In New Zealand the song peaked at number six. Furthermore, the single was certified gold by the Recording Industry Association of New Zealand (RIANZ) for the shipment of over 7,500 units in New Zealand. The single debuted at number 18 in France, eventually peaking at number eight in the following three weeks. It also peaked at number four in Belgium's Flemish and French charts. The song also peaked within the top 10 positions in the music charts of Denmark, Ireland, Italy, Finland, the Netherlands, and Sweden. In Italy, "Empire State of Mind" was certified multi-platinum. "Empire State of Mind"'s least commercially successful charting territories were Austria, Brazil, and Spain; peaking at number 13, 17, and 27 respectively. The song was featured in trailers for the film Sex and the City 2.

== Music video ==
=== Original video ===
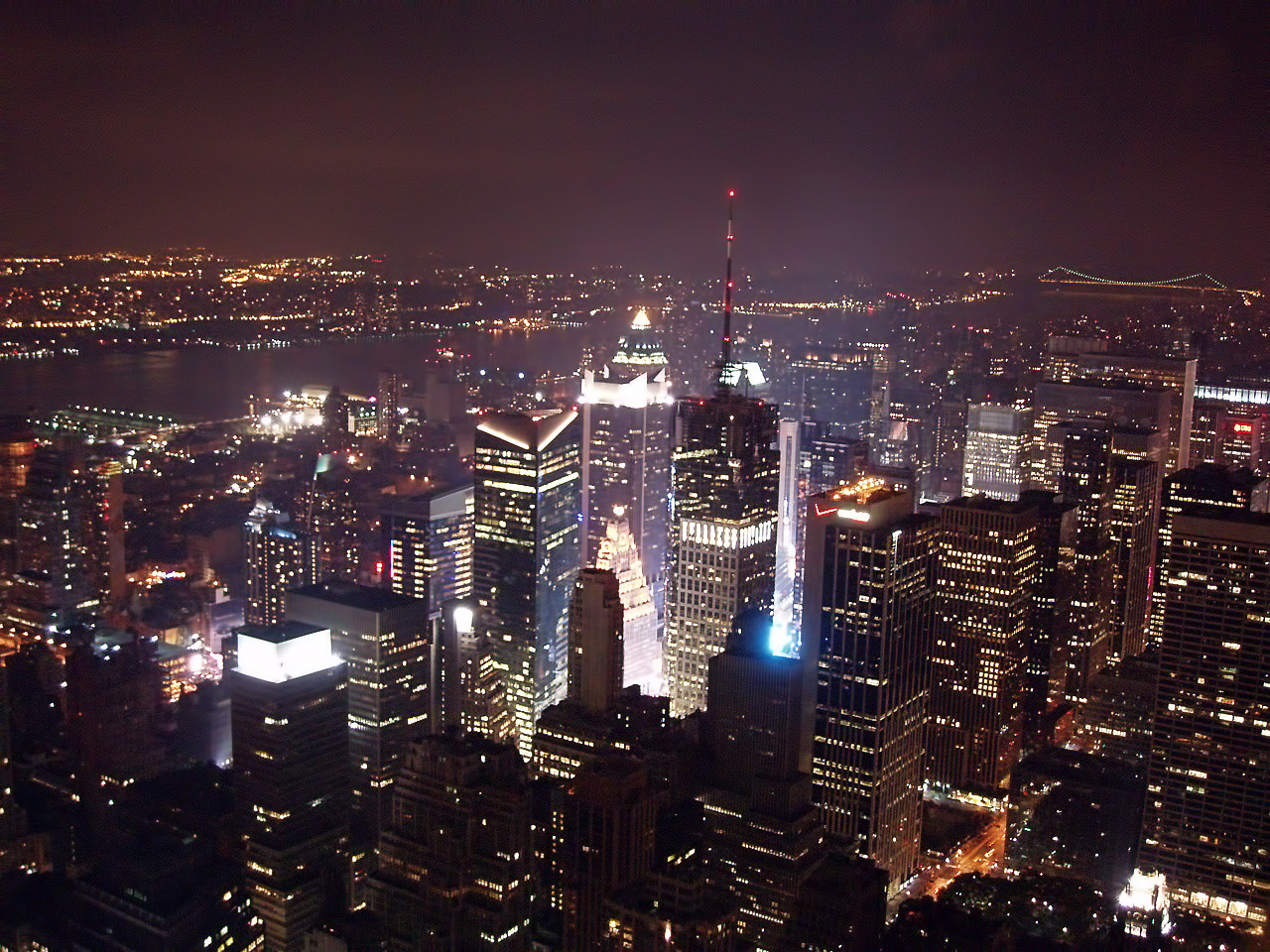
Aerial views of skyscrapers in New York at night are shown throughout the video.

The music video for "Empire State of Mind" was directed by Hype Williams. The video, which was filmed on location, features black-and-white images of New York City intercut with full-color shots of Jay-Z and Keys performing in Times Square. "Empire State of Mind"'s music video began filming on September 29, in Tribeca and around Ground Zero, and was released on October 30, 2009. Keys praised the music video and said that the video has all the key elements of a homage to her hometown.

The music video opens with black-and-white images of locations in New York being shown in the form of a slideshow. The slideshow is then intercut with a black-and-white clip of Jay-Z, wearing a Yankees baseball cap and a vest with no sleeves, performing the song on a street in front of apartment buildings. Then the video begins to rotate from images of New York being shown briefly, to clips of Jay-Z singing "Empire State of Mind" in several locations with different outfits. Images shown include a monument to John D. Rockefeller Jr., street signs and stairwells leading to subway stations.

The video then shows black and white clips of Keys, who is wearing large hoop-earrings with high heels, a black shirt and pants, playing a Yamaha piano that has an image of the Statue of Liberty on it. She is singing her verse of the song in a street at night while cars drive by. Keys' performance is then intercut with aerial views of skyscrapers and clips of the Yankee Stadium, clips of the New York City Police Department (NYPD), and NYPD cars and logos. Some people, such as ones who are walking around New York or wearing Yankee emblems, have their faces shown or blurred out. Keys and Jay-Z, both wearing sunglasses at night, are then shown performing the song together as the video continues to be intercut with clips of them performing "Empire State of Mind" individually, as well as images of New York. The video ends with color vision of the duo performing at night on the red glass steps forming the roof of the TKTS pavilion in Times Square. Interspersed are clips of Keys playing piano and views of the New York skyline.

=== Alternate video ===
Jay-Z's Lifestyle blog came out with an alternative video which features fashion models lip-syncing to the song in various locations in Manhattan. The video was directed by Justin Wu. Drew Grant, a contributor to The New York Observer, expressed uncertainty regarding the promotional message conveyed by the video. However, Grant acknowledged the remarkable ubiquity of the cast members, highlighting the impressive presence they collectively brought to the production. A blogger on Yahoo Music commented that the models "do a better job modeling clothes than miming Jigga", but concluded, however, that the video is "without a doubt the greatest lip-dub ever committed to video".

== Live performances ==
"Empire State of Mind" was first performed at Jay-Z's "Answer the Call" benefit concert in Madison Square Garden on September 11, 2009, where it was the opening song. All ticket proceeds from the show went to the New York Police and Fire Widows and Children's Fund. The song was then performed live at the 2009 MTV Video Music Awards (MTV VMA) on September 13, 2009, where it closed the awards show. The VMA performance was the first time Jay-Z and Keys performed the song together. Shaheem Redi of MTV News commented on the performance that, "Their set was elegant and 'hood at the same time, and it was such a powerful moment". Ryan Brockington of the New York Post wrote "Alicia's buttery voice and Jay-Z's impeccable stage presence made for an audio adrenaline overload" and placed the performance third on his list of the "top six performances" from the MTV VMAs. For the performance Jay-Z wore his signature Yankees cap and Keys wore all black while playing the piano. During the MTV VMA performance images of locations in New York, such as the Empire State Building and the Apollo Theater, were shown on an overhead screen behind Jay-Z and Keys. Towards the end of the performance rapper Lil Mama got up onto the stage uninvited and posed with Jay-Z and Keys while they were finishing the final verse of the track. Lil' Mama said she did not mean to disrespect either performer but the song had her "emotions running high", adding that "in that moment I came up onstage to celebrate my two icons singing about NY." Keys responded to the incident saying "We can appreciate her being overwhelmed and inspired, but we would have appreciated it if she would have done it from her seat", and Jay-Z added, "It was a lot of planning that went into that performance. To disrupt that was outta line." Leah Greenblatt of Entertainment Weekly said that the duo "brought some genuine street heat to the tongue-twisting torrents" of "Empire State of Mind". She added that "Keys, on piano and soaring chorus, brought the feminine strength and soul."

Jay-Z was due to perform "Empire State of Mind" with Keys during the opening game of the 2009 World Series in early October 2009 but, due to an inclement weather, the duo did not perform. They ultimately performed the song live at Yankee Stadium before Game 2 of the 2009 World Series in mid-October. The two musicians performed the song on a custom-made stage adorned with Yankees flags, while images of New York City flashed across several large screens throughout the stadium. Jayson Rodriguez of MTV News wrote of the performance, "If the Yankees were looking to change their tune heading into Game 2 of the World Series, they couldn't have picked better musical guests." During most live performances of the track, the lyrics containing profanity are included in the song, but they were omitted for the World Series set. On November 5, 2009, Jay-Z and Keys sang "Empire State of Mind" at the MTV Europe Music Awards (EMA) in Berlin, Germany, while performing in front of a New York cityscape. Jocelyn Vena and Eric Ditzian of MTV News noted that Jay-Z "took his hometown pride rather seriously" during the performance. Jay-Z also performed the song at the Yankees' World Series victory ceremonies in New York City Hall on November 6, 2009. Keys was not in attendance for the performance, so singer and Roc Nation recording artist Bridget Kelly filled in. As the last verse of the song was sung, Yankee members got up from their seats to shower Jay-Z with handshakes and hugs.

The single was also performed by Jay-Z and Keys at the American Music Awards (AMA) on November 22, 2009. They began their performance of "Empire State of Mind" with a rendition of Frank Sinatra's "New York, New York". Keys played on a piano on a stage with blue lights in front of a backdrop that had tall buildings. Also, the words "New York" scrolled across screens on the stage. Towards the end of the song, Keys sang with Jay-Z at the front of the stage while holding up an "I love you" sign. Todd Martens of the Los Angeles Times felt that the song had "worn out its welcome", adding: "Yes, we know New York is cool. Bars are open late and the public transportation is swell and all, but performing this love letter to New York in Los Angeles? We're tired of it." However, Jeremy Blacklow of Access Hollywood had a more positive feeling towards the performance, describing it as being "so great" in his live blog for the award ceremony. "Empire State of Mind" was performed by Jay-Z and Alicia Keys at the 2010 BRIT Awards on February 16, 2010. The Guardian wrote that Jay-Z and Alicia Keys "dazzled with their rendition of "Empire State of Mind"". According to Metro, Jay-Z and Alicia Keys "blew the place away" with their performance and "Jay-Z was given a welcome befitting a cultural hero" while "Keys oozed elegance and soul as her startlingly powerful voice stopped everyone in their tracks". The Nation opined that the pair "delivered a powerful rendition" of the song.

In March, Jay-Z joined Keys onstage during one of her Freedom Tours New York concerts to perform "Empire State of Mind", while images of New York were shown throughout the concert arena. Jay-Z performed "Empire State of Mind" as well as three of his other singles, at California's Coachella Music Festival in April 2010. Jay-Z performed the song live on an episode of Saturday Night Live on May 9, 2010. Jay-Z performed the song with a medley of his other singles, including "On to the Next One". Jay-Z wore a white T-shirt with a black leather vest while performing the song on a stage light by blue lights, with musicians playing instruments in the far back. Caitlyn Millat of San Diego's NBC felt that Jay-Z "brought the house down" during his performances of the melodies. Rodriguez of MTV News said that Bridget Kelly, who sang Keys' part, "turned more than a few heads" because the outfit she was wearing was "tighter than her boss' rhyme".

Jay-Z and Keys performed the song during Keys' Here in Times Square concert special, televised on BET.

== Sequel ==
Following the release of "Empire State of Mind" in January 2010, Keys stated that she was planning to release a second version of the song as a single the following month, featuring only her vocals. The track, entitled "Empire State of Mind (Part II) Broken Down", appeared on Keys' fourth studio album The Element of Freedom which was released in December 2009. The original version, entitled "Empire State of Mind Part 2", included both Keys' vocals and a new rap verse from Jay-Z, but the final product did not include Jay-Z. Discussing the record, Keys said that it acts as a dichotomy of strength and vulnerability, commenting that "The music is really strong, and the drums are really aggressive, but my voice is vulnerable and delicate".

So I definitely wanted to give my version of it and my vision of how I see New York and how it feels to me. I wanted to do it for my style – more broken down, more on piano, more voice and intimacy – so that's what I did. I imagined, 'If I was able to sing this whole song, how would I do it?' So I just sat down at my piano and I kind of broke it down and started singing about New York as I see it, and it turned out great.

— Keys on recording "Empire State of Mind (Part II) Broken Down"

"Empire State of Mind (Part II) Broken Down" was generally well received by contemporary music critics in their reviews for The Element of Freedom. Allison Stewart of The Washington Post noted that the track, which is a pop ballad, had replaced "Empire State of Mind" sports team references and ruminations with "even milder and less controversial string of generalities", highlighting Keys' version's lyrics "If I could make it here/I could make it anywhere". The song peaked at number four in the United Kingdom, number forty on the Canadian Hot 100, and number sixty-nine in Sweden. It also debuted on the Billboard R&B charts at number seventy-seven and peaked at number fifty-five on the Billboard Hot 100 without an official release.

== Reaction and covers ==
Comedy website CollegeHumor parodied the song in a video titled "Galactic Empire State of Mind" which re-writes the lyrics to follow the events of the first three Star Wars films from the perspective of Darth Vader. The video has been viewed nearly four million times on YouTube.

The music video for "Newport (Ymerodraeth State of Mind)" parodies the song, replacing references to the "Empire State" of New York with of the smaller Welsh city of Newport. In the Welsh language Ymerodraeth means "empire". "Newport (Ymerodraeth State of Mind)" was directed by British filmmaker MJ Delaney and featured London-based actors Alex Warren and Terema Wainwright, rapping and singing respectively. Days after its release Delaney said: "I hope Jay-Z and Alicia get to see the video as long as their publishing people don't force us to take it offline. It's only tongue in cheek." Its participants were invited to appear on national television news and their work was reported in national newspapers. Their work was also so well received in Wales that they were invited to the reopening of the Newport Transporter Bridge. It achieved viral video status when it reached nearly a million hits in 3 days and, by August 2010, nearly 2.5 million people had watched it on YouTube. In July both Warren and Wainwright met with Universal Records (the music publishers) to discuss releasing the track as a single, with some of the proceeds going to the mental health charity Newport Mind. But the seven co-writers of "Empire State of Mind" refused to give permission for the Newport single, a situation which led to the video being removed from YouTube on August 10.

"Empire State of Mind" was covered by the cast of the US television series Glee for the second season premiere episode "Audition" on September 21, 2010. In the episode the fictional William McKinley High School glee club, upon learning that Nationals will be held in New York, decide to perform "Empire State of Mind" at the school courtyard, in the hopes it will pique the interest of their schoolmates. MTV's Kyle Anderson felt that the choreography of "Empire State of Mind" compensated for any awkwardness in its delivery. Aly Semigran, also writing for the same publication, thought the cast's performance was lacking the gravitas of the original version, but reported that Keys had deemed the Glee cover "amazing". Lisa de Moraes of The Washington Post found the song's performance to be "maybe-trying-too-hard". Music critic Tom Stack, of Entertainment Weekly, had a more positive assessment of Glee's take on it in the episode, stating that from the wardrobe to the choreography, it was "spectacular" and elating. He gave it a letter grade of "A". MTV Buzzworthy wrote that "[t]hings get a little dicey when the male cast members make their way through Jay's rapped first verse". Glee's cover version was released as a single and debuted at number twenty-one on the Billboard Hot 100, taking the title for biggest jump of that week. It also charted number twenty in Australia.

In 2010, American alternative dance band LCD Soundsystem played "Empire State of Mind" in concert, performing a verse of the song as a duet between James Murphy and keyboardist Nancy Whang. In May 2011, at 64th Cannes Film Festival, British singer-songwriter Jamie Cullum performed a piano medley of Frank Sinatra's "New York, New York" and "Empire State of Mind" in honour of Robert De Niro. In February 2012, British singer Ed Sheeran did a soulful acoustic rendition of the song at BBC Radio 1's Live Lounge. Sheeran later sang it as a duet with Jason Mraz at the Jingle Ball Viewing Party in December 2012. In April 2012, British glam rock band Sweet released an updated version of the Hello and Ace Frehley hit single "New York Groove" that incorporated the chorus of "Empire State of Mind" into its own chorus.

== Track listings and formats ==
Digital download
No.	Title	Length
1.	"Empire State of Mind" (Explicit)	4:36

International CD-Maxi
No.	Title	Length
1.	"Empire State of Mind" (Explicit Version)	4:36
2.	"Jockin' Jay-Z" (Explicit Version)	4:32
3.	"Run This Town" (Live From Madison Square Garden – Explicit)	6:24

Germany CD single
No.	Title	Length
1.	"Empire State of Mind" (Explicit Version)	4:36
2.	"Jockin' Jay-Z" (Explicit Version)	4:41

US 12"
No.	Title	Length
1.	"Empire State of Mind" (Explicit Album Version)	4:36
2.	"Empire State of Mind" (Amended Album Version)	4:36

== Credits and personnel ==
- Vocals – Jay-Z, Alicia Keys
- Writers – Janet Sewell, Angela Hunte, Shawn "Jay-Z" Carter, Sylvia Robinson, Burt Keyes, Alicia Keys, Alexander Shuckburgh
- Producer – Alexander Shuckburgh
- Keyboards – Jeff Bhasker, Kevin Randolph
- Engineer – Chris Godbey, Andrew Dawson, Karl Heilbron, Marcos Tovar, Miki Tsutsumi, Ann Mincieli
- Arranger – Hart Gunther,
  - Assistant – Jason Wilkie
- Audio Mixing – Ken Duro Ifill
- Assistant Audio Mixing – Jordan "DJ Swivel" Young
- Mastering – Tony Dawsey
- Editor – Jason Wilkie
- Recording – Gimel "Young Guru" Keaton, Ann Mincieli, Luke Steele
- Music samples – "Love on a Two-Way Street" by The Moments

== Charts ==
=== Weekly charts ===
2009–2010 weekly chart performance for "Empire State of Mind"
Chart	Peak position
Australia (ARIA)	4
Australian Urban (ARIA)	1
Austria (Ö3 Austria Top 40)	13
Belgium (Ultratop 50 Flanders)	4
Belgian Airplay (Ultratop Flanders)	29
Belgium (Ultratop 50 Wallonia)	4
Belgian Airplay (Ultratop Wallonia)	2
Canada Hot 100 (Billboard)	3
Canada CHR/Top 40 (Billboard)	4
Canada Hot AC (Billboard)	5
CIS Airplay (TopHit)	148
Czech Republic (Rádio – Top 100)	1
Denmark (Tracklisten)	2
Euro Digital Songs (Billboard)	3
Finland (Suomen virallinen lista)	9
France (SNEP)	8
Germany (GfK)	11
Ireland (IRMA)	2
Israel (Media Forest)	2
Italy (FIMI)	3
Luxembourg Digital Song Sales (Billboard)	3
Mexico Anglo (Monitor Latino)	4
Netherlands (Dutch Top 40)	2
Netherlands (Single Top 100)	2
New Zealand (Recorded Music NZ)	6
Norway (VG-lista)	5
Romania Airplay (Media Forest)	6
Russia Airplay (TopHit)	26
Scottish Singles Sales (Official Charts)	4
Spain (Promusicae)	27
Sweden (Sverigetopplistan)	6
Switzerland (Schweizer Hitparade)	4
UK Singles (OCC)	2
UK Hip Hop/R&B (OCC)	2
US Billboard Hot 100	1
US Adult Pop Airplay (Billboard)	39
US Adult R&B Songs (Billboard)	35
US Hot R&B/Hip-Hop Songs (Billboard)	1
US Hot Rap Songs (Billboard)	1
US Dance Airplay (Billboard)	19
US Pop Airplay (Billboard)	5
US Rhythmic Airplay (Billboard)	1

2019–2026 weekly chart performance for "Empire State of Mind"
Chart	Peak position
Global 200 (Billboard)	122
Hungary (Single Top 40)	34
Portugal (AFP)	188
Poland Airplay (ZPAV)	87

=== Monthly charts ===
2010 monthly chart performance for "Empire State of Mind"
Chart	Peak position
Brazil (Brasil Hot 100)	17
Brazil (Brasil Hot Pop Songs)	7

=== Year-end charts ===
2009 year-end chart performance for "Empire State of Mind"
Chart	Position
Australia (ARIA)	64
Australian Urban (ARIA)	17
Brazil (Crowley)	93
Italy (FIMI)	22
Netherlands (Single Top 100)	45
Sweden (Sverigetopplistan)	63
Switzerland (Schweizer Hitparade)	91
UK Singles (OCC)	30
US Billboard Hot 100	62
US Hot R&B/Hip-Hop Songs (Billboard)	80
US Hot Rap Songs (Billboard)	27

2010 year-end chart performance for "Empire State of Mind"
Chart	Position
Australia (ARIA)	19
Australian Urban (ARIA)	9
Austria (Ö3 Austria Top 40)	47
Belgium (Ultratop 50 Flanders)	32
Belgium (Ultratop 50 Wallonia)	16
Brazil (Crowley)	3
Canadian Hot 100 (Billboard)	24
Denmark (Tracklisten)	48
Netherlands (Single Top 100)	33
European Hot 100 Singles (Billboard)	18
France (SNEP)	52
Germany (GfK)	64
Italy (FIMI)	51
Netherlands (Single Top 100)	33
New Zealand (RIANZ)	47
Romania (Romanian Top 100)	68
Russia Airplay (TopHit)	96
South Korea International Download (Gaon)	26
Sweden (Sverigetopplistan)	93
Switzerland (Schweizer Hitparade)	10
UK Singles (OCC)	78
US Billboard Hot 100	21
US Hot R&B/Hip-Hop Songs (Billboard)	49
US Hot Rap Songs (Billboard)	8
US Pop Airplay (Billboard)	34
US Rhythmic (Billboard)	15

2011 year-end chart performance for "Empire State of Mind"
Chart	Position
France (SNEP)	99
South Korea International Download (Gaon)	101

2012 year-end chart performance for "Empire State of Mind"
Chart	Position
France (SNEP)	105
South Korea International Download (Gaon)	90

2013 year-end chart performance for "Empire State of Mind"
Chart	Position
South Korea International Download (Gaon)	104

=== All-time charts ===
All-time chart performance for "Empire State of Mind"
Chart	Position
US Billboard Hot 100 (Women)	98

== Certifications ==
Certifications and sales for "Empire State of Mind"
Region	Certification	Certified units/sales
Australia (ARIA)	3× Platinum	210,000^{^}
Austria (IFPI Austria)	Gold	15,000^{*}
Belgium (BRMA)	Platinum	30,000^{*}
Brazil (Pro-Música Brasil)	3× Platinum	180,000^{‡}
Denmark (IFPI Danmark)	2× Platinum	180,000^{‡}
France (SNEP)	Gold	150,000^{*}
Germany (BVMI)	3× Gold	900,000^{‡}
Italy (FIMI)	2× Platinum	60,000^{*}
Japan (RIAJ)	Gold	100,000^{*}
Japan (RIAJ) PC download	Gold	100,000^{*}
New Zealand (RMNZ)	6× Platinum	180,000^{‡}
Portugal (AFP)	2× Platinum	50,000^{‡}
Spain (Promusicae)	Platinum	60,000^{‡}
South Korea	—	1,544,543
United Kingdom (BPI)	3× Platinum	1,800,000^{‡}
United States (RIAA)	Diamond	10,000,000^{‡}
^{*} Sales figures based on certification alone.^{^} Shipments figures based on certification alone.^{‡} Sales+streaming figures based on certification alone.

== Release history ==
Release dates and formats for "Empire State of Mind"
Region	Date	Format(s)	Label(s)	Ref.
United States	September 1, 2009	Digital download	Roc Nation; Atlantic	
United Kingdom	September 14, 2009	Digital download	Roc Nation	
Japan	September 23, 2009	Digital download	Warner Music	
United States	September 29, 2009	12-inch vinyl	Roc Nation; Atlantic	
United States	October 19, 2009	Rhythmic contemporary radio	Roc Nation	
United Kingdom	November 2, 2009	CD	Roc Nation	
Germany	November 13, 2009	CD; maxi CD	Warner Music	
France	December 28, 2009	CD	Warner Music	

== See also ==
- List of Hot 100 number-one singles of 2009 (U.S.)
- List of R&B number-one singles of 2009 (U.S.)
- List of Billboard Hot 100 top 10 singles in 2009
- List of Billboard Hot 100 top 10 singles in 2010
- List of number-one R&B/hip-hop songs of 2009 (U.S.)
- List of number-one digital songs of 2009 (U.S.)
- List of Billboard number-one rap songs of the 2010s
- List of Billboard Rhythmic number-one songs of the 2000s
- List of Hot 100 Airplay number-one singles of the 2000s
- List of Billboard number-one rap singles of the 2000s
- List of Billboard Hot 100 number-one singles of the 2000s
- List of Billboard Hot 100 number-one singles of 2009
- List of number-one songs of the 2010s (Czech Republic)
- List of Top 25 singles for 2010 in Australia
- New Zealand Top 50 singles of 2010
- List of UK top 10 singles in 2009
- Billboard Year-End Hot 100 singles of 2010
- List of top 100 singles of 2011 (France)
- List of best-selling singles in 2012 (France)
- List of top 100 singles of 2010 (France)
- Worldwide top ten singles in 2009
- List of best-selling singles in the United States
- List of songs about New York City
- "California Gurls" (a reputed answer song to "Empire State of Mind")
