= Dedication 6 =

Mixtape by Lil Wayne
- Released: December 25, 2017
- Recorded: 2015–2017
- Genre: Hip-hop
- Length: 54:32; 91:34 (Reloaded)
- Label: Young Money
- Compiler: DJ Drama

Lil Wayne chronology
In Tune We Trust (2017)	Dedication 6 (2017)	Tha Carter V (2018)

Dedication 6: Reloaded
- Dedication 6: Reloaded cover art

Dedication 6 is a two part mixtape by American rapper Lil Wayne, hosted by DJ Drama. The first part of the mixtape was released on December 25, 2017. A second part of the mixtape titled Dedication 6: Reloaded was released on January 26, 2018. It is the sixth installment of Lil Wayne's "Dedication" series, following its predecessors The Dedication, Dedication 2, Dedication 3, Dedication 4 and Dedication 5. It is the sixth installment of Lil Wayne's "Gangsta Grillz" chronology.

== Background ==
On February 2, 2015, DJ Drama posted a picture of him, Lil Wayne, and Mack Maine on Instagram with the caption, "Sorry For The Wait 2. Carter V. Dedication 6". Hip-hop publications, like HotNewHipHop, interpreted the post as an indicator that Dedication 6 will be released after Tha Carter V. On April 4, 2016, DJ Drama invited Lil Wayne and 2 Chainz on an episode of his Shade 45 podcast "Streetz is Watchin" to discuss the release of the album, ColleGrove. The topic of conversation eventually turned to Lil Wayne and DJ Drama's "Dedication" mixtape series, and specifically the whereabouts of the next installment, Dedication 6.

I started no longer wanting Drama to put out only songs I'm doing my own little remixes to. I started giving him original music. I started approaching mixtapes as to actually getting a little more recognition than albums. So start paying attention to what you're doing and how you're doing it on there, and still doing the same thing. That's why when you ask me what's my favorite Dedication, I'm always going to say the last one because I'm trying to get only better than the last shit.

Wayne also said:

I want it to be something you can listen to ten years from now, just like when I walk in, I meet people, and they be like, 'Damn, Dedication 3, I still listen to that every day.

== Promotion ==
Lil Wayne has teased the mixtape several times throughout 2016 and 2017. It was rumored to be released sometime before the end of 2017. Lil Wayne's manager Cortez Bryant hinted it may release in November 2017. Lil Wayne announced on Twitter that the mixtape would be released on Christmas Day. A few days before the mixtape's release, Lil Wayne released the audios of the tracks "Bank Account" and "Blackin Out" on his YouTube page. On December 29, 2017, Wayne announced on his Twitter a second part of Dedication 6 titled "Dedication 6: Reloaded" and released the audio to the track "Family Feud". On January 23, 2018, Wayne released the audio to the track "Big Bad Wolf". The following day, Wayne released "Bloody Mary" featuring Juelz Santana.

== Track listing ==
Dedication 6
No.	Title	Original Song (Artist)	Length
1.	"Fly Away"	"DNA" (Kendrick Lamar)	4:48
2.	"Everyday We Sick"	"Everyday We Lit" (YFN Lucci and PnB Rock)	2:42
3.	"Boyz 2 Menace" (featuring Gudda Gudda)	"For Real" (Lil Uzi Vert)	3:53
4.	"Eureka" (featuring HoodyBaby)	"Teefus" (300lbs of Guwop)	3:10
5.	"5 Star" (featuring Nicki Minaj)	"Rockstar" (Post Malone and 21 Savage)	4:47
6.	"Bank Account"	"Bank Account" (21 Savage)	4:04
7.	"XO Tour Life" (featuring Baby E)	"XO Tour Llif3" (Lil Uzi Vert)	3:53
8.	"Let Em All In" (featuring Euro and Cory Gunz)	"Phone Jumpin'" (Dave East and Wiz Khalifa)	3:25
9.	"Young"	"No Limit" (G-Eazy, ASAP Rocky, and Cardi B)	3:06
10.	"New Freezer" (featuring Gudda Gudda)	"New Freezer" (Rich the Kid and Kendrick Lamar)	2:09
11.	"What's Next" (featuring Zoey Dollaz)	CashMoneyAP; Oso Familiar	3:59
12.	"Blackin' Out" (featuring Euro)	"The Story of O.J." (Jay-Z)	3:45
13.	"SUWU"	"Prblms" (6lack)	3:42
14.	"My Dawg" (featuring HoodyBaby)	"My Dawg" (Lil Baby)	3:52
15.	"Yeezy Sneakers"	"Roll in Peace" (Kodak Black and XXXTentacion)	3:12
Total length:			54:32

Dedication 6: Reloaded
No.	Title	Original Song (Artist)	Length
1.	"For Nothing"	"Trap Phone" (Belly and Jadakiss)	5:58
2.	"Go Brazy" (featuring Jay Jones)	"Plain Jane" (ASAP Ferg)	3:51
3.	"Weezy N Madonna" (featuring Stephanie)	"Loyalty" (Kendrick Lamar and Rihanna)	4:40
4.	"Big Bad Wolf"	"Hip Hopper" (Blac Youngsta and Lil Yachty)	4:36
5.	"Sick"	"Booty" (Blac Youngsta)	3:49
6.	"Family Feud" (featuring Drake)	"Family Feud" (Jay-Z and Beyonce)	5:54
7.	"Abracadabra" (featuring Jay Jones and Euro)	Rio	5:54
8.	"Back from the 80's"	"Tell Somebody" (Kid Ink)	3:45
9.	"Gumbo" (featuring Gudda Gudda)	"Gummo" (6ix9ine)	2:55
10.	"Drowning" (featuring Vice Versa and Marley G)	"Drowning" (A Boogie wit da Hoodie)	5:03
11.	"Back to Sleep"	"Woke Up Like This" (Playboi Carti and Lil Uzi Vert)	4:09
12.	"Thought It Was a Drought"	"Thought It Was a Drought" (Future)	4:42
13.	"Groupie Gang"	"Gucci Gang" (Lil Pump)	3:37
14.	"Don't Shoot Em" (featuring Marley G and Rich the Kid)	"Left da Bank" (Zaytoven and Young Dolph)	3:38
15.	"2 Hot for TV" (featuring Lil Twist)	"Pull Up Wit ah Stick" (SahBabii)	5:14
16.	"Kreep"	"Slippery" (Migos and Gucci Mane)	3:01
17.	"Freaky Side"	"Dreams and Nightmares" (Meek Mill)	6:13
18.	"Main Things"	"The Race" (Tay-K)	4:54
19.	"Light Years"	"Set It Off" (Bryson Tiller)	4:27
20.	"Bloody Mary" (featuring Juelz Santana)	Dizzy Banko / Remix of "Hail Mary" (Makaveli, The Outlawz, and Prince Ital Joe)	5:14
Total length:			91:34
