= Rey Reel =

American record producer and songwriter

Raymond De'Andre Martin (born September 13, 1988), known professionally as Rey Reel, is an American record producer and songwriter. Reel has produced for artists such as Fabri Fibra, Beyonce, Nicki Minaj, Mariah Carey, Drake, Lil Wayne, will.i.am and Britney Spears among others. Rey Reel signed a publishing deal with Sony/ATV in May 2015. He is perhaps best known for producing Beyonce's "Flawless", Drake's "Trophies", will.i.am's "Scream & Shout" (Remix)., and Fabri Fibra's "Come Vasco". Rey has also done scores for Tv shows such as Lucifer, Empire, Apple.com ( commercial ), and more. He made his first tv appearance in Oxygen's musical tv show for the strong female artist " Sisterhood of Hip Hop " and is continuing to further his career in acting.

== Musical career ==
Rey Reel began pursuing his production career at age 15 in his home studio. He forged a partnership with hip hop duo Audio Push and produced the hit, "Teach Me How To Jerk". He began collaborating with childhood friend Hit-Boy and together, the duo produced songs for Diddy, Britney Spears, Drake, and Mariah Carey. In December 2014, Rey Reel was nominated for his first Grammy for his production contribution on the Grammy nominated "Beyonce" for Album of the Year.

== Production Style ==
Rey has been quoted describing his sound as "...more of the experimental type; I don't like to tie myself down to just one genre. I want to try everything. I'm actually just now starting to listen to some country music so I can cater to that kind of artist. It may not end up being my thing, but I want to try it first and see how it goes. I tend to favor pop, only because I like to mash hip hop drums with pop sounds." His production is based around an alternative keyboard.

== Awards and nominations ==
Grammy Nominations

Year	Nominee/Work	Award	Result
2015	"BEYONCE"	Album Of The Year	Nominated

BMI Awards

Year	Nominee/Work	Award	Result
2015	"Trophies"	Top 30 Records Played	Won

== Production Discography ==
Singles Produced

Year	Title	Chart Positions: US / US/ R&B / US Rap / UK R&B				Album
2013	"Scream & Shout" (Remix) (will.i.am featuring Britney Spears, Lil Wayne, Waka Flocka Flame, Hit-Boy and Diddy)	—	49	—	—	#willpower
2014	"Trophies" (Drake)	50	13	5	—	Young Money: Rise of an Empire
2014	"Flawless" (Remix) (Beyonce featuring Nicki Minaj)	41	12	—	6	BEYONCE

Rey Reel's Production

Year	Artist	Song	Project
2013	Dev featuring Sage The Gemini	"Kiss It"	
2013	Lil Bibby	"Whole Crew"	Free Crack
2013	Casey Veggies featuring Rockie Fresh	"Sacrifice"	
2013	Skeme	"Oversick"	Ingleworld
2014	Mariah Carey	"Thirsty"	Me. I Am Mariah...The Elusive Chanteuse
2014	The Game featuring Skeme	"Mad Flows"	Year Of The Wolf
2015	Leikeli47	"I'm Through"	Leikeli47
2015	Fabri Fibra	"Come Vasco"	Squallor
2015	Fabri Fibra	"Non me ne frega un Cazzo	Squallor
2015	Trey Songz	"Do It Now"	Intermission I & II
2015	Major Myjah	"Headed For The Dark"	Trouble
2015	Casey Veggies	"The Boy"	
2015	Hit-Boy	"Show Me Something"	
2015	Audio Push featuring Travis Scott	"Party 101"	
2015	BMACTHEQUEEN	"Always Knew"	Black Kid$
2015	BMACTHEQUEEN	"Million Dollars"	Black Kid$
2015	BMACTHEQUEEN	"All Summer"	Black Kid$
2015	BMACTHEQUEEN	"Confession"	Black Kid$
2016	Ingrid	"Double Pedigree"	Trill Feels - EP
2016	Lil Mallrat	"Tokyo Drift"	Uninvited - EP
2016	Audio Push	"Hyperbolic Vibe Chamber"	90951
2016	RiFF RAFF	"Tonka Toy Freestyle"	Balloween
2016	The Griswolds	"Feels So Right"	High Times For Low Lives
2016	Audio Push featuring BMACTHEQUEEN	"Servin'"	The Stone Junction
2016	Chase N. Ca$he	"Came To See"	
2016	MissDefiant	"Ear Candy"	
2017	Fabri Fibra	"Nessun Aiuto"	"Fenomeno"
2017	Fabri Fibra	"Pensa per te"	"Fenomeno (Masterchef EP)"
