= Euro (rapper) =

American rapper

- Born: Eufradis Rodriguez; October 28, 1992 (age 33); Dominican Republic
- Origin: Providence, Rhode Island, United States
- Genres: Hip hop
- Occupation: Rapper
- Instrument: Vocals
- Years active: 2012–present
- Labels: Young Money; Cash Money; Republic; EMPIRE

Eufradis Rodriguez (born October 28, 1992), better known by his stage name Euro, is a Dominican-American rapper signed to Young Money Entertainment, and was born in the Dominican Republic. Lil Wayne announced that he is the new member of Young Money on his Dedication 5 mixtape. He then appeared on the second Young Money compilation album, Young Money: Rise of an Empire, on three songs, including the first single "We Alright". Euro released a mixtape called July, on July 31, 2014. It was a preview for his debut studio album, Don't Expect Nothing, which had many delays. Don't Expect Nothing was finally released on September 20, 2019.

== Musical career ==
=== 2013–present: Early life and career beginnings ===
Euro developed his rapping talents by getting into Christian rap at the early age of 7 in his father's church. Euro's stage name was inspired by the first two letters of his first name and last name (Eufradis Rodriguez). Lil Wayne announced that Euro was the newest signee to Young Money Entertainment on his Dedication 5 mixtape. Euro featured on four songs on that mixtape in 2013, "Ain't Worried", "Cream", "Fuckin' Problems", and "Live Life". Lil Wayne has said that it was his "straight-to-the-point lyrical style" that first attracted him to Euro. He then appeared on the second Young Money compilation album, Young Money: Rise of an Empire, on three songs, the first single "We Alright", "Bang", and a solo track "Induction Speech". In 2014 Euro attended a street heat production free-styling back and forth with Cory Gunz, showing off his extensive rap skills. Euro Released a freestyle over Rico Richie's "Poppin" beat produced by 808 Mafia.

Euro announced that he will be releasing his debut mixtape, Don't Expect Nothing, with a release date during 2014. On July 31, 2014, Euro released a seven track mixtape named July as a preview for Don't Expect Nothing, which was released on September 20, 2019.

== Discography ==
=== Compilation albums ===
List of albums, with selected chart positions
Title	Album details	Peak chart positions			Certifications
Title	Album details	US	US R&B	US Rap	Certifications
Young Money: Rise of an Empire (with Young Money)	Released: March 11, 2014; Label: Young Money, Cash Money, Republic; Format: CD, digital download	7	4	3	
"—" denotes a recording that did not chart or was not released in that territory.

=== Mixtapes ===
List of mixtape, with selected details
Title	Album details
July	Released: July 31, 2014; Label: Young Money, Cash Money; Format: Digital Download
Don't Expect Nothing	Released: September 20, 2019; Label: Secret Weapon Entertainment; Format: Digital Download
Lost Files	Released: September 24, 2024; Label: Secret Weapon Entertainment; Format: Digital Download

=== Singles ===
==== As featured artist ====
List of singles as featured performer, with selected chart positions, showing year released and album name
Title	Year	Peak chart positions			Album
Title	Year	US	US R&B	US Rap	Album
"We Alright" (Young Money featuring Euro, Lil Wayne and Birdman)	2014	—	56	—	Young Money: Rise of an Empire
"Vaselina" (Ramengvrl featuring Euro)	2020	—	—	—	Can't Speak English
"—" denotes a recording that did not chart or was not released in that territory.

=== Guest appearances ===
List of non-single guest appearances, with other performing artists, showing year released and album name
Title	Year	Other artist(s)	Album
"Ain't Worried"	2013	Lil Wayne, Jae Millz	Dedication 5
"Live Life"	2013	Lil Wayne	Dedication 5
"Cream"	2013	Lil Wayne	Dedication 5
"Fuckin' Problems"	2013	Lil Wayne, Kidd Kidd	Dedication 5
"We Hate It"	2014	Flow	Withdrawals
"Pull Up"	2015	Lil Wayne	Free Weezy Album
"Destroyed"	2015	Lil Wayne	No Ceilings 2
"Mula Gang"	2017	Lil Wayne, HoodyBaby, Jay Jones	In Tune We Trust
"Church"	2020	Lil Wayne, HoodyBaby, Gudda Gudda	No Ceilings 3
"Tuxedo"	2023	Lil Wayne	Tha Fix Before Tha VI
