= Like a Man (Onhel song) =

Single by Onhel featuring Lil Wayne
- Released: August 8, 2017
- Genre: Tropical house
- Length: 3:32
- Producers: Onhel; DJ Sirome

Lil Wayne singles chronology
| "Love U Better" (2017) | "Like a Man" (2017) | "Uproar" (2018) |

"Like a Man" is a song recorded by Onhel, featuring American rapper Lil Wayne. It was released as a single on August 8, 2017.

== Background ==
The song was described as tropical house with "Wayne's signature croaky, Auto-Tuned vocals". It was shared on Onhel's SoundCloud page, crediting himself as the primary artist and Wayne as the featured artist. It was released one month after Wayne released four songs. Rumored to be a single off Wayne's unreleased Tha Carter V album, the song was leaked in early August. In response to the leak, Wayne officially released it himself to "get ahead" of pirates.

== Production ==
The song was produced by Wayne's long-time audio engineer Onhel, who has produced over fifty songs with him. Wayne said the song was done several years ago but only decided to officially release when he heard the new production. A snippet of the original production was leaked online by hacker group, Music Mafia.
