= No Ceilings 2 =

Mixtape by Lil Wayne
- Released: November 26, 2015
- Recorded: 2015
- Genre: Hip-hop
- Length: 96:38
- Label: Self-released
- Producers: The Beat Bully; Beewirks; Boi-1da; Daxz; Dr. Dre; Dr. Luke; Ducko McFli; Epikh Pro; FKi; Frank Dukes; Freeway TJ; Illangelo; JudoBeatz; Mannie Fresh; Mano; Metro Boomin; Nate Rhoads; Nav; Neenyo; The Olympicks; Pascal Blais-Scherer; Post Malone; Rex Kudo; Roc & Mayne; Southside; Squat Beats

Lil Wayne chronology
Free Weezy Album (2015)	No Ceilings 2 (2015)	ColleGrove (2016)

No Ceilings 2 is the fourteenth mixtape by American rapper Lil Wayne, released on November 26, 2015. The mixtape was self-released due to Wayne leaving Cash Money Records. It features guest appearances from Baby E, Curren$y, Euro, Future, Gudda Gudda, Hoodybaby, Jae Millz, King Los, Lucci Lou, Mannie Fresh, Shanell, Stephanie Acevedo, T@, Turk, & Yo Gotti.

== Reception ==
The mixtape received generally positive reviews from critics. HeyReverb described Wayne's efforts as loose and limber, going on to say it’s “hilarious, absurd, outrageous and brilliant”. Forbes commented "Despite Label Woes, Lil Wayne Remains The Mixtape Master".

NME gave the mixtape 4/5 and saying "This aint a stop-gap, it's a goddamn arms race. 'No Ceilings 2', Lil Wayne's newest free mixtape, is about more than suppressing fans’ appetites for the New Orleans rapper's much-delayed album 'Tha Carter V', of which there's still no sign. His third release this year, and sequel to 2009's 'No Ceilings', is a reminder of Wayne's prowess, as he outdoes rivals on their own tracks. Robert Christgau gave the album a 3-star honorable mention rating, which corresponds to "an enjoyable effort consumers attuned to its overriding aesthetic or individual vision may well treasure.".

Artists Wiz Khalifa and Erykah Badu have expressed their fondness of the tape on social media.

== Track listing ==
No.	Title	Producer / Original Song (Artist)	Length
1.	"Fresh" (featuring Mannie Fresh)	Mannie Fresh	1:57
2.	"Back 2 Back"	"Back to Back" (Drake)	3:11
3.	"My Name Is"	"My Name Is" (Eminem)	3:37
4.	"Where Ya At"	"Where Ya At" (Future and Drake)	3:30
5.	"Cross Me" (featuring Future and Yo Gotti)	The Beat Bully	3:25
6.	"I'm Nice"	"Don't" (Bryson Tiller)	3:21
7.	"Duck" (featuring Jae Millz, Gudda Gudda, and Shanell)	Ducko Mcfli; The Olympicks	5:15
8.	"Poppin'" (featuring Curren$y)	"Poppin'" (Rico Richie)	3:54
9.	"Jumpman"	"Jumpman" (Drake and Future)	4:01
10.	"Destroyed" (featuring Euro)	Beewirks	3:48
11.	"Finessin' (Remix)" (performed by Baby E featuring Lil Wayne)	"Finessin'" (Baby E)	2:47
12.	"Milly Rock" (featuring Lucci Lou and Turk)	"Milly Rock" (2 Milly)	4:28
13.	"Live from the Gutter" (featuring HoodyBaby and T@)	"Live from the Gutter" (Drake and Future)	4:39
14.	"Big Wings"	"Big Rings" (Drake and Future)	3:37
15.	"Too Young"	"White Iverson" (Post Malone)	4:04
16.	"Lil Bitch"	"Watch Out" (2 Chainz)	3:43
17.	"Get Ya Gat" (featuring Lucci Lou and HoodyBaby)	Roc & Mayne	4:51
18.	"No Reason" (featuring King Los)	Freeway TJ	3:54
19.	"Plastic Bag" (featuring Jae Millz)	"Plastic Bag" (Drake and Future)	4:34
20.	"Hotline Bling"	"Hotline Bling" (Drake)	4:20
21.	"Crystal Ball" (featuring Stephanie Acevedo)	Metro Boomin	4:51
22.	"Diamonds Dancing"	"Diamonds Dancing" (Drake and Future)	5:06
23.	"No Days Off"	"No Days Off" (Fetty Wap and Monty)	4:37
24.	"The Hills"	"The Hills" (the Weeknd)	4:18
Total length:			96:38
