= Flow (rapper) =

American rapper

- Born: Widner DeGruy
- Origin: New Orleans, Louisiana, U.S.
- Genre: Hip hop
- Occupations: Rapper; songwriter; record producer
- Years active: 2008–2019
- Labels: FGM; Flight School; Young Money

Widner DeGruy, also known by his stage name Flow, is an American rapper from New Orleans, Louisiana. He began his music career with hip hop group, The Flamez and is the CEO of Flame Gang Music. In 2012, he signed to Lil Wayne's label Young Money Entertainment. That same year, Flow formed another group called L.A.T. (Loyalty Amongst Thieves) with rappers Gudda Gudda and Kevin Gates. Flow would tour with labelmate Lil Wayne.

== Career ==
=== 2008–present: Career beginnings and mixtapes ===
In 2008, Flow released numerous freestyles with fellow New Orleans rappers DY and Skitz on the mixtape, How 2 Grind Vol. 2. Flow also formed the hip hop group, The Flamez and the label Flame Gang Music with his friends 12 Shotty and Slim Boogie And their music producer Niyo Davinci. In 2009, DeGruy released his debut mixtape, Heroic Vol. 1 as "Flow da Esho Hero" on Flame Gang Music. DeGruy got signed to Lil Wayne's Young Money Entertainment after featuring on the song, "Inkredibles" with T@, Thugga, and Raw Dizzy and Chris Flow . The song appeared on Wayne's, Sorry 4 the Wait. In August 2012, Flow released his second mixtape, Wolf All Produced By Niyo Davinci on Flame Gang Music, Young Money Entertainment, and Cash Money Records.

After frequently collaborating with singer Christian Radke, Radke and Flow released a collaboration mixtape titled, Brothers from Another Kolor on February 13, 2013. In The mixtape was released on iTunes on June 14, 2014. In March 2014, Flow appeared on the song, "Fresher Than Ever" with rappers Jae Millz, Gudda Gudda, Chris Flow Birdman, and Mack Maine on the Young Money compilation album, Young Money: Rise of an Empire. On June 3, 2014, Flow released his third mixtape, Withdrawals on Flame Gang Music, Young Money Entertainment, and Cash Money Records. The mixtape was supported by the two singles, "Withdrawals" and "Fuck Off".

== Legal issues ==
In July 2013, DeGruy was arrested for attempted first-degree murder in Chalmette and two counts of armed robbery. DeGruy was arrested in the Oakland, California, area recently by a U.S. Marshal's task force and was returned to Chalmette for prosecution after waiving extradition. DeGruy had fled to California after arrest warrants alleged that he had shot at, and narrowly missed, a man he knew on April 29. He allegedly had beaten and robbed two men of cash and their cell phones. DeGruy was released from the St. Bernard Parish Sheriff Office in December 2013.

In May 2015, DeGruy and two others were indicted for the double murder of brothers, Kendrick and Kendred Bishop. New Orleans police took DeGruy into custody on September 25 along with his girlfriend, Jamya Brady, who was accused of helping him elude cops. Police say DeGruy dropped his cell phone at the murder scene and returned with a lie about dropping the device. He later changed up his story, according to The Advocate. Alleged accomplice Jonathan "Lil Joe" Evans, who is also charged in the murder indictment, has been behind bars since July 2015. The fourth suspect, Chantell Edwards, faces accessory to murder charges, though police have yet to track her down. Evans and DeGruy were reportedly identified through surveillance video from the crime scene. Both men gave fake names upon their arrest. His bail has been set at $3.5 million.

In May 2019, Flow was found guilty of two counts of second-degree murder and conspiracy to commit second-degree murder by a jury vote of 11:1, and he was sentenced to life in prison. He was tried separately for obstruction of justice and conspiracy to commit obstruction of justice, to which he pled guilty.

On April 20, 2020, the United States Supreme Court in Ramos v. Louisiana, overruled a line of Louisiana jurisprudence and held that a defendant's Sixth Amendment right to a jury trial, as applied to the States by the Fourteenth Amendment, requires a unanimous jury verdict for a state felony conviction. This rule applies retroactively to all criminal cases properly preserved for review at the time Ramos was decided. In the wake of the results of this Supreme Court ruling, DeGruy submitted an appeal to his sentencing in October 2020, which resulted in his second-degree murder and conspiracy to commit second-degree murder charges being dropped. DeGruy is currently serving a forty-year and thirty-year sentence to imprisonment at hard labor for his obstruction of justice and conspiracy to commit obstruction of justice charges, respectively.

== Discography ==
=== Compilation albums ===
List of albums, with selected chart positions
Title	Album details	Peak chart positions		
Title	Album details	US	US R&B	US Rap
Young Money: Rise of an Empire (with Young Money)	Released: March 11, 2014; Label: Young Money, Cash Money, Republic; Format: CD, digital download	7	4	3
"—" denotes a recording that did not chart or was not released in that territory.

=== Mixtapes ===
List of mixtapes and selected details
Title	Album details
Heroic Vol. 1	Released: May 12, 2009; Label: FGM; Format: Digital download
Headphones & Weedbongs (with The Flamez)	Released: April 20, 2010; Label: FGM; Format: Digital download
Still Smokin (with The Flamez)	Released: April 20, 2011; Label: FGM; Format: Digital download
Everyday Iz Halloween (with The Flamez)	Released: November 3, 2011; Label: FGM; Format: Digital download
Wolf	Released: August 8, 2012; Label: FGM, Young Money, Cash Money; Format: Digital download
Brothers from Another Kolor (with Christian Radke)	Released: February 13, 2013; Label: FGM, Young Money, Cash Money, Kush, WhatsReallyGood; Format: Digital download
Withdrawals	Released: June 3, 2014; Label: FGM, Young Money, Cash Money; Format: Digital download

=== Singles ===
==== As lead artist ====
List of singles, with selected chart positions and certifications, showing year released and album name
Title	Year	Peak chart positions			Album
Title	Year	US	US R&B	US Rap	Album
"Withdrawals" (featuring Drop Boy Rell)	2014	—	—	—	Withdrawals
"Fuck Off" (featuring Chanel West Coast)	2014	—	—	—	Withdrawals
"Real Nigga Problems" (with Shwag)	2015	—	—	—	WWE (Wild Wild East)
"Below Zero" (with Christian Radke)	2015	—	—	—	non-album single
"—" denotes a recording that did not chart or was not released in that territory.	2015				

==== As featured artist ====
List of singles, with selected chart positions and certifications, showing year released and album name
Title	Year	Peak chart positions			Album
Title	Year	US	US R&B	US Rap	Album
"Off Day" (Lil Wayne featuring Flow)	2014	—	—	—	Tha Carter V
"Keep a Secret" (Philthy Rich featuring Flow and Starlito)	2014	—	—	—	SemCity MoneyMan 3
"Meteorites" (Chris King featuring Flow)	2015	—	—	—	Fontana
"Red" (LEXcann featuring Flow)	2015	—	—	—	non-album single
"Dope" (remix) (JaSoRude featuring Gudda Gudda and Flow)	2015	—	—	—	non-album single
"Beef Ain't Never Squashed" (remix) (MightyLee featuring Flow)	2015	—	—	—	Still Undisputed
"All the Time" Nathan Fox New Orleans born August 27, 1991 (FOX featuring Flow and Slim Boogie)	2015	—	—	—	non-album single
"Codeine Cups" (Jay Lee featuring Flow)	2015	—	—	—	The Heart of The Hustler
"—" denotes a recording that did not chart or was not released in that territory.

=== Guest appearances ===
List of non-single guest appearances, with other performing artists, showing year released and album name
Title	Year	Other artist(s)	Album
"Inkedible"	2011	Lil Wayne, Thugga, T@, Raw Dizzy	Sorry 4 the Wait
"Magic"	2012	Lil Wayne	Dedication 4
"I'm a Star"	2014	Shy Glizzy, Gudda Gudda	Young Jefe
"Finessin'"	2015	Nino Wavey	Born Wavey
"Da Squad"	2015	ArtFace	Twisted Thoughts 3
"Will C"	2015	DJ	G.R.W.C.
"Stick Up"	2015	Byrd, Nino Wavey	Possession With Intent
"Loaded"	2015	Jay Lewis, Shy Glizzy	Dream of Gettin' Rich
"Plugz"	2015	Goo Glizzy	Mad Max
"Half of Me"	2016	Good Money Global, Jah	We Global
"Stash Box"	2016	Good Money Global, Bonka, Nino Wavey, Jah	We Global
