= Mona Lisa (Lil Wayne song) =

2018 song by Lil Wayne featuring Kendrick Lamar

Song by Lil Wayne featuring Kendrick Lamar

from the album Tha Carter V
- Released: September 28, 2018
- Recorded: 2014
- Studio: YM Studios; Criteria Recording Studios, Miami; Glenwood Place, Burbank, California
- Genre: Hip hop
- Length: 5:24
- Label: Young Money, Republic
- Songwriters: Dwayne Carter, Kendrick Duckworth, Marco Rodriguez, Angel Aponte
- Producers: Infamous, ONHEL

Music video
- "Mona Lisa" on YouTube

"Mona Lisa" is a song by American rapper Lil Wayne featuring fellow American rapper Kendrick Lamar. It was released on September 28, 2018, as the eighth track from Wayne's album Tha Carter V. Produced by Infamous and ONHEL, the song was recorded in 2014 and was intended for the album's original release that year, before Tha Carter V was shelved during Wayne's legal dispute with Cash Money Records.

The track is a storytelling rap in which the two rappers narrate opposing sides of a story about a woman who lures men into robberies. It became widely known before its official release after Martin Shkreli, who claimed to have purchased unreleased Tha Carter V material, broadcast a portion of it online in May 2017. On release, "Mona Lisa" debuted and peaked at number two on the US Billboard Hot 100, the highest-charting song from the album, and topped both the Hot R&B/Hip-Hop Songs and Hot Rap Songs charts. It was certified double platinum by the Recording Industry Association of America (RIAA) in 2022. An animated music video directed by Tim Fox premiered in March 2022, almost four years after the song's release.

== Background and recording ==
Producer Infamous (Marco Rodriguez-Diaz Jr.) began work on "Mona Lisa" in 2014, shortly before Tha Carter V was delayed indefinitely because of Wayne's lawsuit against Cash Money Records. Infamous has five production credits on the album, on "Mona Lisa", "Mess", "Open Letter", "Used 2" and "Took His Time".

According to Infamous, Wayne called and asked him to build a new beat around vocals he was already working on. Infamous collected the vocal files from Angel Aponte, who records as ONHEL and was working for Wayne at the time, and the pair built a five-minute instrumental at Infamous's studio. Wayne wrote to the beat and, in Infamous's account, the material "turned into the story".

After Wayne recorded a second verse, the team discussed adding a guest. Infamous said Nas was suggested because of the track's storytelling, before Wayne's engineer Omar Loya proposed Kendrick Lamar. Infamous dated Lamar's contribution to the period around To Pimp a Butterfly and said Lamar's verse was substantially reworked from the beat he had originally recorded to, and that Lamar did not hear the finished version until the album was released.

Infamous rebuilt the production after hearing Lamar's verse, replacing software pianos with live ones, substituting plate reverb throughout, and running elements to quarter-inch tape before recording them back in. He also said roughly 35 seconds were removed from the finished song. Infamous later said he had considered leaking the track himself if the album had continued to go unreleased, but did not once he learned Tha Carter V was coming out.

== Leak ==
In December 2016, Martin Shkreli said in an interview with DJ Akademiks that he had acquired what he believed to be a finished two-disc version of Tha Carter V, and maintained that the purchase had been legal. Shkreli said the recordings had come to him after a buyer of a car Wayne had previously owned found discs and other belongings inside it, an account that has not been independently verified. He premiered a track from the material on a Periscope livestream that month.

On May 3, 2017, Shkreli broadcast snippets of two further tracks, "Mona Lisa" and "The Life of Carter", describing "Mona Lisa" as the best song on the album. The leak drew attention because of Lamar's presence on an otherwise unreleased Wayne recording. Wayne's representatives and Universal Music Group subsequently pressed Shkreli to stop distributing the material.

== Composition and lyrics ==
At five minutes and 24 seconds, "Mona Lisa" is the longest song on Tha Carter V. Critics described it as a story rap in the tradition of narrative hip hop songs such as OutKast's "Da Art of Storytellin'".

Lamar opens the song with a spoken introduction that frames the narrative. Wayne's verses are delivered from the perspective of a criminal who works with women who seduce wealthy men and set them up to be robbed. Lamar returns for the final verse in the role of a man consumed by suspicion of his partner, delivered in a high, strained register that reviewers described as close to breaking. The title likens the women in the story to the ambiguous expression of Leonardo da Vinci's Mona Lisa, read as concealing intent.

Lamar's closing verse references Wayne's 2008 single "Lollipop" as a ringtone heard by his character.

== Critical reception ==
Writing for Spin, Israel Daramola called the track "a weird, problematic, but also fascinating story of deceit and lust" and "entertaining, both purposefully and in spite of itself", while criticising its framing of women as deceivers. Jordan Bassett of NME praised the pair's imagination in spinning the story but wrote that the song served as an entry point into the misogyny running through the album.

Sowmya Krishnamurthy of Billboard called it a standout moment on the album, writing that the two rappers had "a simpatico vibe" and were "clearly getting the best out of each other". Kevin Goddard of HotNewHipHop described the song as a "lyrical onslaught" with "slick flows & witty metaphors".

Evan Rytlewski of Pitchfork and Mosi Reeves of Rolling Stone both singled the track out in their reviews of Tha Carter V.

The song has since been cited frequently among Lamar's strongest guest appearances.

== Commercial performance ==
"Mona Lisa" debuted at number two on the Billboard Hot 100 chart dated October 13, 2018, behind Maroon 5 and Cardi B's "Girls Like You". It was the highest-charting song from Tha Carter V. With "Mona Lisa" at number two and "Don't Cry" at number five, Wayne became the first artist to debut two songs in the top five of the Hot 100 simultaneously. In the same week he charted 22 of the album's 23 tracks on the Hot 100 and became the second act, after Drake, to debut four songs in the top ten at once.

The song also debuted at number one on the Billboard Streaming Songs chart with 43.1 million US streams, Wayne's first chart-topping debut on that list as a lead artist. It topped Hot R&B/Hip-Hop Songs and Hot Rap Songs, and reached number seven in Canada and number 21 in the United Kingdom.

The RIAA certified "Mona Lisa" double platinum on September 27, 2022, as part of a group of 22 certifications issued to Wayne.

== Music video ==
An animated video for "Mona Lisa" premiered on Wayne's YouTube channel on March 11, 2022, nearly four years after the song's release. It was directed and lead-animated by Tim Fox, a director at The Mill.

Fox described the video as "a Heist movie with a horror twist, set in a grimy New Orleans", casting Wayne as the mastermind, Lamar as the clean-up man and the women used as bait as vampires. It was produced using motion capture, toon shaders and cinematic lighting, with scenes blocked out as though for live action, and incorporates passages of traditional 2D animation.

The video was the most-viewed project in Motionographer's "Quickie" series in 2022. At the 2023 Webby Awards it was nominated in the Weird category for video and named an Honoree in Technical Achievement.

== Live performance ==
Wayne has declined to perform "Mona Lisa" live. In footage that circulated in June 2024, during the period of the Kendrick Lamar–Drake feud, he told an audience that the reason was the difficulty of the song's lyrics rather than the feud, and said he intended to learn it.

== Personnel ==
Credits adapted from the official Tha Carter V credits.

- Lil Wayne – vocals, songwriting
- Kendrick Lamar – vocals, songwriting
- Infamous – production, songwriting
- ONHEL – co-production, songwriting, recording
- Keith Cooper – flute, clarinet
- Kev Marcus – violin
- Wil Baptiste – viola
- Omar Loya, Manny Galvez, Derek "MixedByAli" Ali – recording
- Jason Delattiboudere, Jeffrey Tanner – assistant recording
- Fabian Marasciullo – mixing
- McCoy Socalgargoyle – assistant mixing
- Colin Leonard – mastering

== Charts ==
Weekly chart performance for "Mona Lisa"
Chart (2018)	Peak position
Australia (ARIA)	42
Canada (Canadian Hot 100)	7
Lithuania (AGATA)	26
New Zealand (Recorded Music NZ)	39
Switzerland (Schweizer Hitparade)	36
UK Singles (OCC)	21
US Billboard Hot 100	2
US Hot R&B/Hip-Hop Songs (Billboard)	1
US Hot Rap Songs (Billboard)	1
US Streaming Songs (Billboard)	1

== Certifications ==
Region	Certification	Certified units/sales
New Zealand (RMNZ)	Gold	0^{*}
United States (RIAA)	Platinum	1,000,000^{‡}
^{*} Sales figures based on certification alone.^{^} Shipments figures based on certification alone.
