= Uproar (Lil Wayne song) =

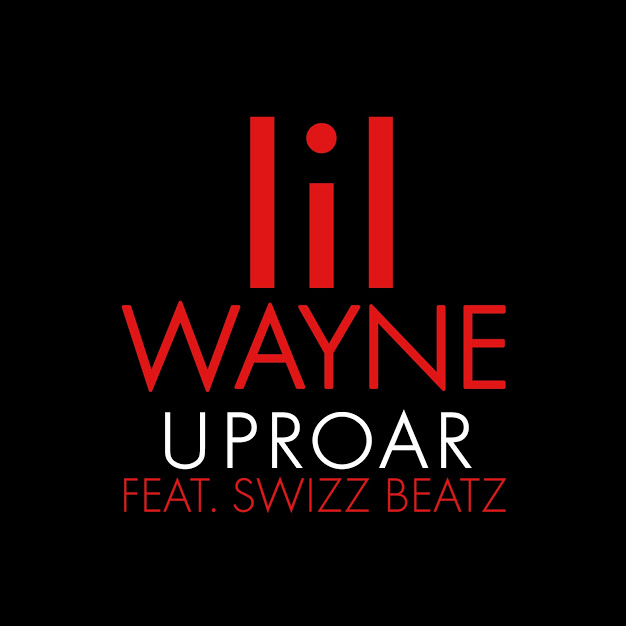

Single by Lil Wayne featuring Swizz Beatz

from the album Tha Carter V
- Released: October 5, 2018
- Recorded: 2018
- Genre: Hip-hop
- Length: 3:13
- Label: Young Money; Republic
- Songwriters: Dwayne Carter Jr.; Kasseem Dean; Avery Chambliss; Brian Holland; Lamont Dozier; Edward Holland
- Producers: Avenue Beatz; Swizz Beatz

Lil Wayne singles chronology
"Like a Man" (2017)	"Uproar" (2018)	"Good Form" (2018)

Swizz Beatz singles chronology
"Pistol On My Side (P.O.M.S.)" (2018)	"Uproar" (2018)	"Big Tyme" (2019)

Music video
- "Uproar" on YouTube

"Uproar" is a song by American rapper Lil Wayne. Young Money Entertainment and Republic Records released the song to rhythmic and Urban radio on October 5, 2018, as the lead single from Wayne's twelfth studio album, Tha Carter V (2018).

The song features vocals and production from Swizz Beatz. "Uproar" contains a sample of "Special Delivery" by G. Dep. The song reached number seven on the US Billboard Hot 100 chart and was certified double platinum by the Recording Industry Association of America (RIAA).

== Music video ==
The music video for the song was released on October 18, 2018.

== Charts ==
=== Weekly charts ===
Chart (2018)	Peak position
Canada (Canadian Hot 100)	24
UK Singles (OCC)	99
US Billboard Hot 100	7
US Hot R&B/Hip-Hop Songs (Billboard)	6
US Rhythmic Airplay (Billboard)	5

=== Year-end charts ===
Chart (2018)	Position
US Hot R&B/Hip-Hop Songs (Billboard)	99
Chart (2019)	Position
US Hot R&B/Hip-Hop Songs (Billboard)	60
US Rhythmic (Billboard)	36

== Certifications ==
Region	Certification	Certified units/sales
Canada (Music Canada)	Gold	40,000^{‡}
United States (RIAA)	2× Platinum	2,000,000^{‡}
^{‡} Sales+streaming figures based on certification alone.
