= T-Wayne (album) =

2017 collaborative mixtape by T-Pain and Lil Wayne

Mixtape by T-Pain and Lil Wayne
- Released: May 18, 2017
- Recorded: 2009
- Genres: R&B; hip-hop
- Length: 28:13
- Labels: Nappy Boy; Young Money
- Producers: Bangladesh; Tha Bizness; T-Pain

T-Pain chronology
Happy Hour (2014)	T-Wayne (2017)	Oblivion (2017)

Lil Wayne chronology
ColleGrove (2016)	T-Wayne (2017)	In Tune We Trust (2017)

T-Wayne is a collaborative mixtape by American singer T-Pain and American rapper Lil Wayne. Recorded in 2009, it was delayed due to Lil Wayne's legal troubles and was unexpectedly released for free streaming on May 18, 2017, by Nappy Boy Entertainment & Young Money Entertainment. T-Pain initially leaked a cover for the album and then several hours later posted it in its entirety for free download on mixtape sharing sites.

Professional ratings
Review scores
Source	Rating
Pitchfork	6.1/10
PopMatters	6/10 stars
Vice (Expert Witness)	(2-star Honorable Mention)

== Track listing ==
1. "He Rap He Sang" – 2:29
2. "Listen to Me" – 2:33
3. "DAMN DAMN DAMN" – 5:04
4. "Waist of a Wasp" – 3:52
5. "Oh Yeah" – 1:09
6. "Breathe" – 4:27
7. "Snap Ya Fangas" – 4:33
8. "Heavy Chevy" – 4:06

== Personnel ==
- Lil Wayne – vocals on all tracks except "Oh Yeah"
- T-Pain – vocals with production on "He Rap He Sang" and "Snap Ya Fangas"
- Bangladesh – production on "Breathe"
- Tha Bizness – production on "Listen to Me", "Damn Damn Damn", "Waist of a Wasp", "Oh Yeah", and "Heavy Chevy"
- Pencil Fingerz – creation of the album's cover artwork
