= We Alright =

Single by Young Money featuring Euro, Birdman and Lil Wayne

from the album Young Money: Rise of an Empire
- Released: January 22, 2014
- Genre: Hip hop
- Length: 5:12
- Label: Young Money; Cash Money; Republic
- Songwriters: Eufradis Rodriguez; Bryan Williams; Dwayne Carter; Sam Gumbley
- Producer: S-X

Young Money singles chronology
"Tapout" (2013)	"We Alright" (2014)	"Trophies" (2014)

Euro singles chronology
"We Alright" (2014)

Birdman singles chronology
"Tapout" (2013)	"We Alright" (2014)	"High Off My Love" (2015)

Lil Wayne singles chronology
"Loyal" (2013)	"We Alright" (2014)	"Thug Cry" (2014)

Music video
- "We Alright" on YouTube

"'We Alright'" is a song by the American record label Young Money Entertainment, released by the label itself along with Cash Money Records and Republic Records on January 22, 2014, as the first single from their second compilation album, Young Money: Rise of an Empire (2014). It is performed by Young Money rappers Euro and Lil Wayne and features Cash Money Records founder Birdman.

== Music video ==
The Colin Tilley-directed music video was released on February 15, 2014. The video features cameo appearances from multiple members of Young Money.

== Track listing ==
Digital single

No.	Title	Writer(s)	Producer(s)	Length
1.	"We Alright" (featuring Euro, Birdman and Lil Wayne)	Eufradis Rodriguez, Bryan Williams, Dwayne Carter, Sam Gumbley	S-X	5:12
