= Lookin Ass =

Single by Young Money featuring Nicki Minaj

from the album Young Money: Rise of an Empire
- Released: February 14, 2014
- Recorded: 2013
- Genre: Hip hop
- Length: 2:41
- Label: Young Money; Cash Money; Republic
- Songwriter(s): Onika Maraj; Noel Fisher; Maurice Brown; Kemion Johnel Cooks
- Producer(s): Detail; Choppa Boi

Young Money singles chronology
"Trophies" (2014)	"Lookin Ass" (2014)	"Super Bowl" (2020)

Nicki Minaj singles chronology
"Clappers" (2013)	"Lookin Ass" (2014)	"Pills n Potions" (2014)

Alternative cover
- Original artwork released by Minaj

"Lookin Ass" is a song by rapper Nicki Minaj, released on February 14, 2014 as the third single from the Young Money Entertainment compilation album Young Money: Rise of an Empire (2014). It was produced by Detail and Choppa Boi. The music video for the track was released on February 14, 2014. The track is a hip hop song which lyrics criticize stereotypical behaviors commonly associated with black men.

Its cover also generated controversy for placing an image of activist Malcolm X, next to the derogatory term "nigga". On March 11, 2014, "Lookin Ass" was serviced to urban contemporary radio in the United States as Young Money: Rise of an Empire's third official single. It was sent to US rhythmic radio stations on March 18, 2014, two weeks after its predecessor, "Trophies".

== Background ==
In May 2013, Minaj announced that her then-untitled third studio album would "focus on rap", whereas her previous record Pink Friday: Roman Reloaded (2012) explored more prominent elements of pop music. She further stated that she would begin writing material for the project later that year, after production was completed for her first feature film The Other Woman (2014). Minaj discussed in an interview how the song "Lookin' Ass" was conceived:

"I was in New York, and I don't know if [Detail] was out there," said Nicki of Detail. That was for the BMI thing. They had given me all these awards, and they honored Cash Money, and we went out to eat, and Detail was out there acting crazy, getting mad drunk. So Safaree went outside and spoke to him like, 'Yo...Nicki's about to start working on her album heavy,' and he [said], 'Oh word? I've been trying to get in the studio with her.' So they set it up, we came about to L.A. ...and 'Lookin' Ass' was the first thing I did with him. It took a minute because I wanted to perfect every line... and it came out really good."

The album was mentioned in Minaj's freestyle of "Boss Ass Bitch" by PTAF (Pretty Taking All Fades), and was officially announced to be titled The Pinkprint with the premiere of "Lookin' Ass" on February 12. The track was additionally featured on Young Money: Rise of an Empire, a compilation album by Minaj's label Young Money Entertainment.

== Composition ==
"Lookin Ass" is a hip hop song; it commences with "a persistent piano thump and auto-tuned wail", after which Minaj begins rapping about her criticisms of the male gender, which are referred to as "lookin' ass niggas". Her verses highlight particular distastes of men fixating over her buttocks, embellishing their financial stability, and overemphasize their connections with drug-dealing. Latifah Muhammad from HipHopWired suggested that Minaj "feverishly protects her rap crown spitting a furious flow of angry bars" in response to earlier criticisms she had received for experimenting with pop music. She additionally noted that Minaj followed a "similar rhyme pattern throughout" and "[stacked] multisyllabic bars ending each bar with the controversial N-word."

== Critical reception ==
"Lookin Ass" received generally positive reviews from music critics. Rob Markman from MTV News joked that "someone forgot to tell Nicki Minaj" that rap music is traditionally led by men, and complimented that "this 2014 version of Nicki is far more menacing than anything we've seen" with her earlier projects. Complex listed the second verse of the song as the fifth best rap verse of 2014. The song also was on Spin's list of "The 101 Best Songs of 2014".

== Controversy ==
The unofficial single cover for "Lookin Ass" features a picture of the late activist Malcolm X holding an M1 carbine in his Queens, New York residence in 1964. The placement of the derogatory term "nigga" beside his image generated controversy; Alvin Aqua Blanco of Blanco from HipHopWired suggested that "to equate a man that literally died for his cause — the advancement of human rights for people of color — is just wrong on multiple levels." Latifah Muhammad from the same website made an additional note of its release during Black History Month. Minaj apologized through her Instagram account, commenting that the image was not intended as the official cover:

"What seems to be the issue now? Do you have a problem with me referring to the people Malcolm X was ready to pull his gun out on as Lookin Ass Niggaz? Well, I apologize. That was never the official artwork nor is this an official single. This is a conversation. Not a single. I am in the video shooting at Lookin Ass Niggaz and there happened to be an iconic photo of Malcolm X ready to do the same thing for what he believed in!!!! It is in no way to undermine his efforts and legacy. I apologize to the Malcolm X estate if the meaning of the photo was misconstrued. The word "nigga" causes so much debate in our community while the "nigga" behavior gets praised and worship. Let's not. Apologies again to his family. I have nothing but respect an adoration for u. The photo was removed hours ago. Thank you."

== Music video ==
In February 2014, Minaj uploaded pictures of herself through Instagram during production of an unannounced project; she was dressed in "a black see-through leotard and star-shaped nipple covers". She later implied that she had been filming a music video, commenting "Behind the scenes. Shot by @grizzleemusic [sic]" on another picture uploaded on the service.

The final product was directed by Nabil Elderkin, and was released through hip hop website WorldStarHipHop on February 12, 2014. The monochrome video takes places in a vacant section of land near a mountain range. Minaj is seen suggestively posing throughout the clip and holding an assault rifle on several occasions. Close-up footage of men staring at her is interspersed throughout the clip; Minaj shoots at them at the end of the video.

== Charts ==
Chart (2014)	Peak position
US Bubbling Under Hot 100 (Billboard)	4
US Hot R&B/Hip-Hop Songs (Billboard)	28
