= In Tune We Trust =

EP by Lil Wayne
- Released: July 5, 2017
- Recorded: 2017
- Genre: Southern hip-hop
- Length: 15:50
- Label: Young Money Entertainment

Lil Wayne chronology
T-Wayne (2017)	In Tune We Trust (2017)	Dedication 6 (2017)

In Tune We Trust is the second extended play (EP) by American rapper Lil Wayne. It was released on July 5, 2017, under Young Money Entertainment. It is his first extended play in ten years, following The Leak (2007), which included songs that were leaked from Tha Carter III. The four songs on the EP were recorded by Lil Wayne during his ongoing feud with Cash Money Records. Lil Wayne stated that he would give his fans new material before Tha Carter V is finally released. Lil Wayne decided to put the EP on the streaming services DatPiff and SoundCloud. A music video for the track "Loyalty" was released on the WorldStarHipHop YouTube page. The EP features a freestyle over rapper Playboi Carti's breakout hit "Magnolia".

== Track listing ==
No.	Title	Producer(s)	Length
1.	"Loyalty" (featuring Gudda Gudda and HoodyBaby)	T@	3:39
2.	"Magnolia (Freestyle)"	Pierre Bourne	3:01
3.	"Fireworks" (featuring Jeezy)	Mike Will Made-It	4:13
4.	"Mula Gang" (featuring Jay Jones, HoodyBaby, and Euro)	Rio; Kamo; Kamiphat	4:57
Total length:			15:50
