= SahBabii =

American rapper

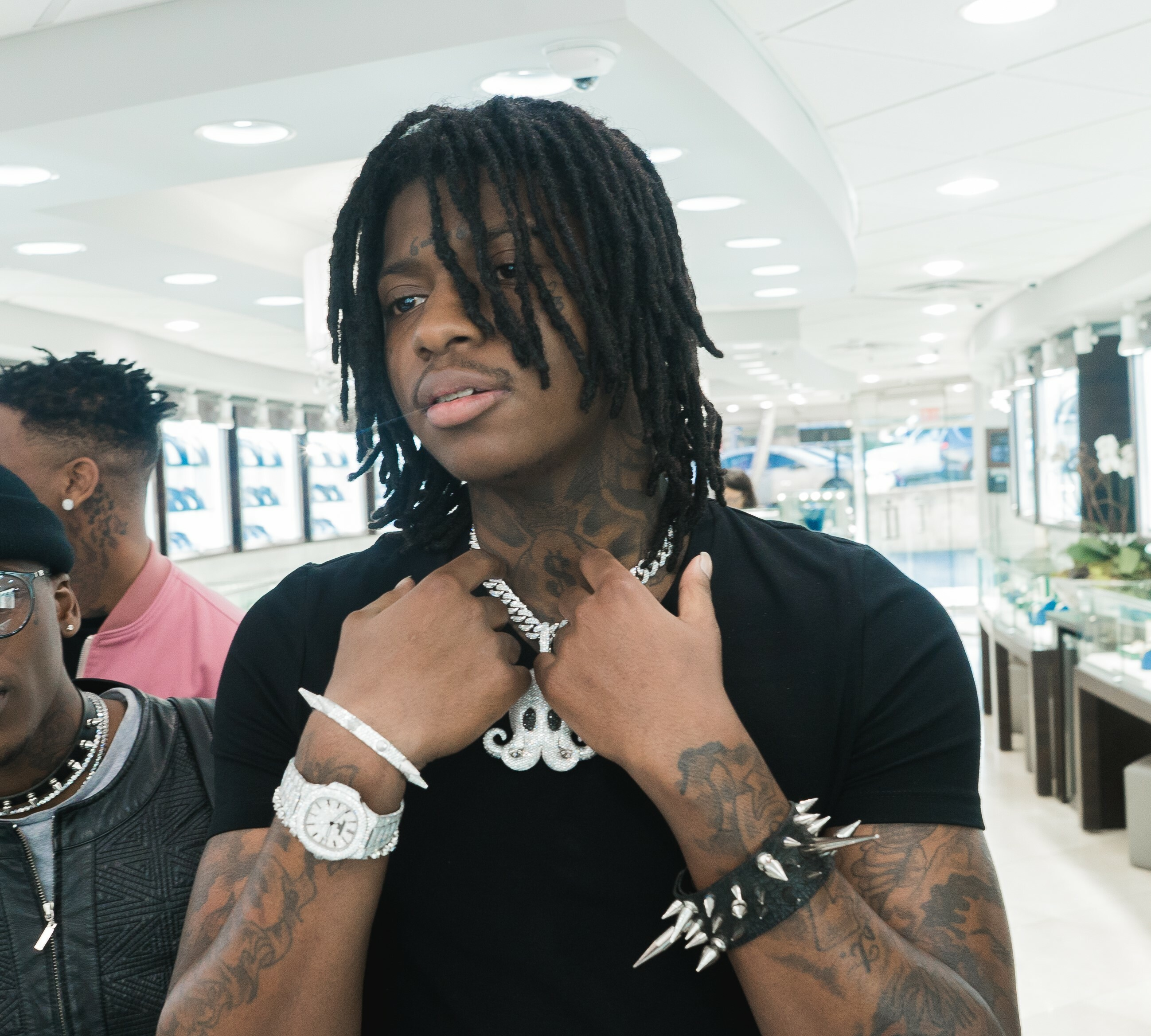
- SahBabii in 2018

Background information
- Also known as: Sah; King Squid; Young Squid
- Born: Saaheem Valdery; February 24, 1997 (age 29); Chicago, Illinois, U.S.
- Origin: Atlanta, Georgia, U.S.
- Genres: Southern hip-hop; R&B
- Occupations: Rapper; singer; songwriter
- Years active: 2012–present
- Labels: Casting Bait; Warner

Saaheem Valdery (born February 24, 1997), better known by his stage name SahBabii, is an American rapper. Born in Chicago and raised in Atlanta, Georgia, he is best known for his 2016 single "Pull Up wit ah Stick", which received platinum certification by the Recording Industry Association of America (RIAA). SahBabii peaked at No. 8 on Billboard's Next Big Sound chart in July 2017.

== Early life ==
Saaheem Valdery was born in Chicago, Illinois and raised in the city's South Side in the Wentworth Gardens projects. His aunt, TeeBaby, gave him the moniker "SahBabii" at a young age. In early 2010 at the age of 13, his family moved to Atlanta, Georgia in pursuance of his older brother’s career in music. They moved to Sylvan Hills.

== Career ==
Saaheem began recording music under the name 'SahBabii' shortly after arriving in Atlanta. His older brother, T3, helped produce his songs, and SahBabii released two early mixtapes: Pimpin Ain't Eazy (2012) and Glocks & Thots (2013). Alongside music production, SahBabii would also begin posting videogame gameplay of Grand Theft Auto Online to two of his YouTube Channels, one titled "Noᴙmal" and the other titled "Normalty."

After a nearly three-year hiatus and whilst working at Dick's Sporting Goods, SahBabii released a follow-up mixtape, S.A.N.D.A.S., in 2016. S.A.N.D.A.S. was recorded on the music software program, Cubase, using a broken microphone in T3's bedroom. The mixtape featured the single, "Pull Up wit ah Stick" featuring rapper Loso Loaded, which went viral on Instagram after SahBabii posted a 15-second clip of the song before its release.

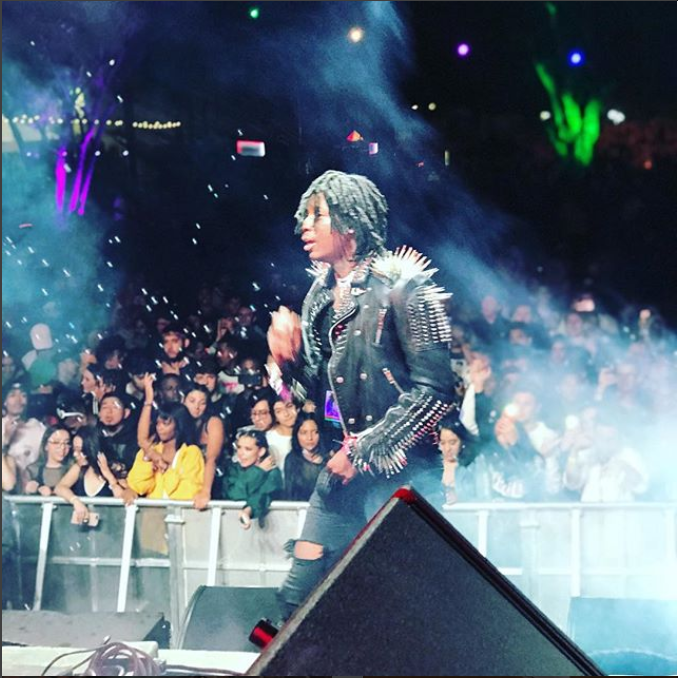
SahBabii

Soon after, the song made headlines and garnered millions of plays on SoundCloud. The music video for the song was released in February 2017 and is currently sitting at over 70 million views on the WorldStarHipHop YouTube channel. In March 2017, SahBabii reportedly signed a $2 million record deal with Warner Bros. Records. His family also founded the production company, Casting Bait Music Group, and SahBabii's father, Delval, became his manager.

"Pull Up wit ah Stick" was later remixed by Young Thug, T-Pain, Fetty Wap, and Wiz Khalifa. The song was later remixed by Lil Wayne which was released on the Dedication 6 mixtape. Drake also expressed interest in adding a verse of his own to the official remix of the song. SahBabii was flown to London, UK by Young Thug where he also met Drake.

In May 2017, it was announced that SahBabii would be remastering and re-releasing S.A.N.D.A.S. with new tracks on the Warner Bros. label. S.A.N.D.A.S. was mainly remastered by audio engineer Alex Tumay and partially by T3, with Tumay remastering tracks 2, 3, 6, 8, 10, 11, and 12, and T3 remastering tracks 4, 5, 7, and 9. It was also announced that producer Mona Scott-Young was interested in shooting a reality television show centered on SahBabii and his family.

Shortly after the end of the S.A.N.D.A.S. press run, SahBabii's professional relationship with Warner Bros. Records came to an end.

His breakthrough full-length project, Squidtastic was released in 2018. This was followed up by the EP 3P, in 2019.

In early 2019, SahBabii publicly stated that he would retire. However, he decided against this, "because of the fans". He stated, "I couldn't just turn my back on them. I'ma still retire, though. But I just wanted to make sure I give my fans the most music I can give them before I stop".

On July 8, 2020, SahBabii released the album Barnacles. Complex described the album as putting "the focus squarely on SahBabii's distinctive, dreamlike sound. With surreal production and off-kilter vocals, Barnacles is a unique look into what makes his music so appealing". His song Purple Umbrella samples "Star-Stealing Girl" from the Chrono Cross Original Soundtrack by Yasunori Mitsuda.

In February 2020, SahBabii was featured on rapper Trippie Redd's project A Love Letter to You 4 (Deluxe) on the song 'Amazinggg.' On September 16, 2020, SahBabii released his single "Gates to the Sun (POLLEN Singles)" featuring Japanese musician Joji on Spotify. In November 2020, SahBabii was featured on rapper Nav's mixtape project Emergency Tsunami, on the song 'Do Ya Deed'.

He made an appearance in early 2021 on the track "Solitaires" with Ateyaba.

Sahbabii's debut studio album, Do It For Demon, was released on October 27, 2021. The album is named after and dedicated to his late cousin 'DemonChild' (Demon) who was killed in a shooting in 2020. In an interview with Cass Navarro from Acclaim magazine in December 2021, SahBabii mentioned that Do It For Demon was the first of his projects that was recorded on professional equipment and that he and T3 built an entirely new studio for it. Mic described the album as "a rousing showcase of the artist's vulnerability", while noting that "the sexual animal references and unpredictable ad-libs that OG fans love are still warranted space".

On December 6, 2022, alongside a massive list of other Hip-Hop artists, SahBabii was the subject of having 41 of his songs leaked and circulated online. On December 26, 2022, SahBabii would post on his Snapchat account, "I've been workin on a new project that's coming very soon next year. None of my most recent music has leaked. Enjoy "LeaKout" until that day comes I appreciate the love." On December 27, 2022, SahBabii released the project LeakOut consisting of music that had been leaked online in the weeks prior.

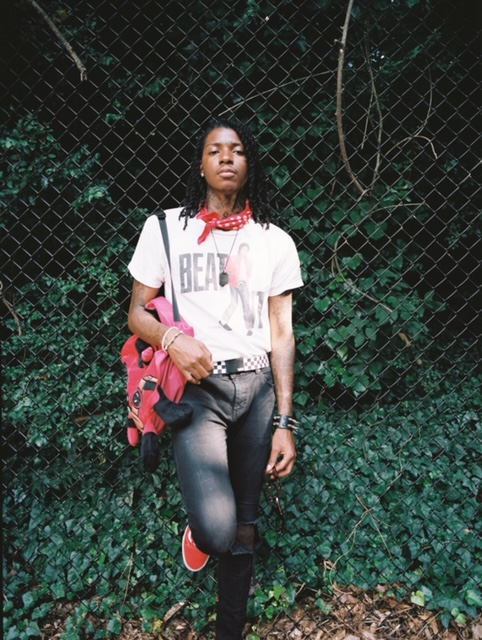

On January 31, 2023, SahBabii released a single titled "How Bout U?" On May 16, 2023, SahBabii released a single titled "Lost All My Feelings."

On November 8, 2024, SahBabii released Saaheem, a studio album titled after his given name. The album contains his 2023 single "Lost All My Feelings".

On November 17, 2024, Sahbabii announced his 2025 Resurrection Tour through North America, to promote his album Saaheem.

== Influences ==
In an interview with XXL, Hypebeast, and Acclaim Mag SahBabii cited T3, Future, Young Thug, Rich Homie Quan, Ca$h Out and Nujabes as his main influences.

== Controversies ==
=== Feud with rapper Offset ===
In May 2017, rapper Offset from the group Migos posted a video on his Instagram account criticizing the recent trend of hip-hop/rap artists wearing inverted crosses jewelry, "All y'all niggas wearing upside-down crosses, these are my little partners man...stop that shit boy, you look lame. All that worship the devil shit. Get with God, man."

SahBabii angrily responded to Offset on his Instagram account with a post of a screenshot from the original video Offset posted, writing in the caption, "Nigga You Look Lame Fuck You Talm Boud My Cross Gon Stay Upside Down Y'all Niggas Donate $1,000 to Washington But Will Throw $10,000 in a Club I Will Beat Yo Ass." He also made another post with the caption, "Show These Niggas Respect Now Fuck Migos!! We Ain't Going For No Disrespect Nobody Asked This Lame Ass Nigga Opinion."

Offset later responded to SahBabii by posting a video where he claims SahBabii is not affiliated with PDE (Paradise East Apartments in Atlanta), Slaughter Gang, the Mob, and is not originally from Atlanta and also his jewelry is not authentic. He also mentioned that he will come to SahBabii's neighborhood and have SahBabii's own neighborhood associates beat him up. SahBabii then responded in a video where he claims Offset instigated this argument, and then he called Offset a 'faggot' for wearing pigtails and dyeing his hair various colors throughout his career. SahBabii continued in another video where he claims his inverted crosses jewelry is not sacrilegious but it is symbolic of the self-created ideology he believes in called 'Unknownism' which aims to seek the truth.

A month later in June 2017, SahBabii conducted an interview with DJ Drama and spoke about his negative interactions with Offset and how Offset should not be speaking down on his young musical peers, "But I feel like he don't need to be speaking down on people. I don't speak on no other religions or nothing like that, so I don't think he should be speaking down on young people." He also expressed regret for even responding to Offset's original video as he claims to be a person who does not engage in any feuds or arguments, "I wish I wouldn't never even responded to that, because I ain't the type to do all that Internet beef."

== Tours ==
=== Headlining ===
Resurrection Tour (2025)

== Discography ==
=== Studio albums ===
- Barnacles (2020)
- Do It for Demon (2021)
- LeakOut (2022)
- Saaheem (2024) – No. 123 US Billboard 200

=== Mixtapes ===
- Pimpin Ain't Eazy (2012)
- Glocks & Thots (2013)
- S.A.N.D.A.S. (2016)
- S.A.N.D.A.S. (Remastered)
- Squidtastic (2018)

=== Extended plays ===
- 3P (2019)

=== Charted singles ===
List of singles as lead artist, with selected chart positions
Title	Year	Peak chart positions				Certifications	Album
Title	Year	US	US R&B/HH	US Rap	CAN	Certifications	Album
"Pull Up wit ah Stick" (featuring Loso Loaded)	2016	— (Note: "Pull Up wit ah Stick" did not enter the Billboard Hot 100, but peaked at number three on the Bubbling Under Hot 100 Singles chart, which acts as an extension to the Hot 100.)	47	—	—	RIAA: Platinum	S.A.N.D.A.S.
"K9" (with Don Toliver)	2026	64	24	19	84		Octane

=== Other charted songs ===
Title	Year	Peak chart positions	Album
Title	Year	US Bub.	Album
"Beep Beep" (with Travis Scott)	2025	18	JackBoys 2
