= Trophies (song) =

Single by Young Money featuring Drake

from the album Young Money: Rise of an Empire
- Released: February 27, 2014
- Recorded: 2013
- Genre: Hip hop
- Length: 3:08
- Label: Young Money; Cash Money; Republic
- Songwriters: Aubrey Graham; Chauncey Hollis Jr.; Noah Shebib; Marvin Thomas; Raymond Martin; Bernard Gérard; Sharon Abshire
- Producers: Hit-Boy; 40; Hagler; Rey Reel

Young Money singles chronology
"We Alright" (2014)	"Trophies" (2014)	"Lookin Ass" (2014)

Drake singles chronology
"Who Do You Love?" (2014)	"Trophies" (2014)	"Believe Me" (2014)

"Trophies" is a song by Canadian rapper Drake. The song was produced by Hit-Boy, 40, Hagler and Rey Reel. The song was originally meant for Drake's third studio album Nothing Was the Same, however, it was cut off the final track listing. After Drake released the song himself in December 2013, it was later included on the Young Money Entertainment compilation Young Money: Rise of an Empire. On February 27, 2014, it was officially released as the album's second official single, credited as Young Money featuring Drake. It peaked at number 50 on the US Billboard Hot 100 chart.

The song heavily samples the track "The Big Country" by French composer Bernard Gérard. The instrumental version of the song is the opening theme to The Stephen A. Smith Show radio and television program on ESPN.

== Background ==
The trailer that was released for Drake's third studio album, Nothing Was the Same (2013), featured a snippet of "Trophies" playing in the background, but the song did not make the final version of the album. After teasing its release over the following months, the song surfaced on the internet on December 30, 2013. Hit-Boy, the lead producer of the song, has said that he was more than frustrated with the track's rollout. Then saying, "But it’s love. I got respect for Drake. He knows what’s best for him. He’s been dictating his career since Day One."

== Critical reception ==
The song received positive reviews from music critics. Entertainment Weekly praised it as a blustery, superstar moment. Sheldon Pearce of XXL called the song brilliant and boisterous. Writing for Now, Jordan Sowunmi said, the "stentorian hit" is "a reminder that Young Money boasts some of rap’s biggest crossover stars." David Jeffries of AllMusic said the song featured, "Drake stomping over Hit-Boy's Viking-worthy beat. A two-headed monster of a track that pits verses-filled Southern rap victory against an emo-rap chorus.

== Commercial performance ==
As of May 18, 2014, the song has sold 406,272 copies in the United States according to Nielsen Soundscan. It has spent multiple weeks in the top ten of the US R&B/Hip-Hop Singles Sales chart.

== In other media ==
The song was played at the Rogers Centre in Toronto, Ontario for Toronto Blue Jays legend José Bautista’s induction into the club’s famed Level of Excellence on August 12, 2023, prior to the Blue Jays’ game against the Chicago Cubs.

In 2015, author Minda Harts co-founded The Memo, an organization focused on career development for women of color, alongside Lauren Broussard. The name of the organization was inspired by a verse in the song. The same year, Harts released her first book, The Memo: What Women of Color Need to Know to Secure a Seat at the Table, which was published on August 20, 2019. The book became a number one Amazon bestseller in the business and mentoring category.

== Charts ==
=== Weekly charts ===
Chart (2014)	Peak position
Belgium Urban (Ultratop Flanders)	41
France (SNEP)	190
US Billboard Hot 100	50
US Hot R&B/Hip-Hop Songs (Billboard)	13
US Rhythmic Airplay (Billboard)	12

=== Year-end charts ===
Chart (2014)	Position
US Hot R&B/Hip-Hop Songs (Billboard)	37

== Certifications ==
Region	Certification	Certified units/sales
Denmark (IFPI Danmark)	Gold	45,000^{‡}
New Zealand (RMNZ)	Platinum	30,000^{‡}
United Kingdom (BPI)	Silver	200,000^{‡}
^{‡} Sales+streaming figures based on certification alone.
