= Watch Out (2 Chainz song) =

Single by 2 Chainz

from the album Trap-A-Velli Tre & ColleGrove
- Released: July 22, 2015
- Recorded: 2015
- Genre: Hip hop, trap
- Length: 3:27
- Label: Def Jam
- Songwriters: Tauheed Epps; Trocon Roberts; Joel Balsom
- Producer: FKi

2 Chainz singles chronology
"3500" (2015)	"Watch Out" (2015)	"No Problem" (2016)

"Watch Out" is a song by American hip hop recording artist 2 Chainz. It was released on July 22, 2015 as a single from his mixtape, Trap-A-Velli Tre. This track was produced by FKi. The song was later included as an iTunes exclusive track on 2 Chainz' third studio album ColleGrove. The song was certified Platinum by the Recording Industry Association of America (RIAA) October 12, 2016, for selling over 1,000,000 digital copies in the United States.

== Music video ==
A music video was released on January 25, 2016 on 2 Chainz's Vevo account on YouTube. The video features the head of Chainz on different bodies - from a pianist, to a dancing boy, to a toddler, to a couple of guys playing basketball, to President Obama, and many more. It was directed by Motion Family - a trio composed of David Ka, Diwang Valdez and Sebastian Urrea.

== Commercial performance ==
"Watch Out" debuted at number 85 on Billboard Hot 100 for the chart dated January 16, 2016. It later peaked at number 64.

== Awards and nominations ==
Year	Ceremony	Award	Result
2016	MTV Video Music Awards	Best Hip-Hop Video	Nominated
2016	BET Hip Hop Awards	Best Hip Hop Video	Nominated

== Charts ==
=== Weekly charts ===
Chart (2015–2016)	Peak position
US Billboard Hot 100	64
US Hot R&B/Hip-Hop Songs (Billboard)	19

=== Year-end charts ===
Chart (2016)	Position
US Hot R&B/Hip-Hop Songs (Billboard)	83

== Certifications ==
Region	Certification	Certified units/sales
United States (RIAA)	2× Platinum	2,000,000^{‡}
^{‡} Sales+streaming figures based on certification alone.
