= Young Money: Rise of an Empire =

Studio album by Young Money
- Released: March 11, 2014
- Recorded: 2013–14
- Genre: Hip hop
- Length: 49:59
- Labels: Young Money; Cash Money; Republic
- Producers: Bryan "Baby" Williams (exec.); Ronald Williams (exec.); Dwayne "The President" Carter (exec.); Cortez Bryant (exec.); Mack Maine (exec.); 40; Aaron O'Brien; The Agency; Choppa Boi; David D.A. Doman; Detail; DJ Speedy; Dnyc3; Hagler; Hit-Boy; Jess Jackson; Kemion Cooks; Lee on the Beats; Lex Luger; The Olympicks; Omega; PJ Morton; The Runners; Sonny Digital; S-X

Young Money chronology
Rich Gang (2013)	Young Money: Rise of an Empire (2014)

Singles from Young Money: Rise of an Empire
- 1. "We Alright" Released: January 22, 2014; 2. "Trophies" Released: February 27, 2014; 3. "Lookin Ass" Released: February 27, 2014

Young Money: Rise of an Empire is the second studio album by American supergroup Young Money Entertainment. The album was released on March 11, 2014, by Young Money Entertainment, Cash Money Records and Republic Records. Rise of an Empire's recording process took place from 2013 to 2014. It contains contributions from several Young Money recording artists including, Lil Wayne, Drake, Nicki Minaj, Tyga, Christina Milian, Shanell, Mack Maine, Jae Millz, Cory Gunz, Gudda Gudda, Lil Twist, Chanel West Coast and PJ Morton, among others.

The album was produced by 40, The Runners, Hit-Boy, Detail, Lee on the Beats, Lex Luger, Aaron O'Brien, and Sonny Digital, among others. It also features additional guest appearances from YG, Meek Mill, Yo Gotti and Birdman. The album was supported by the singles; "We Alright" featuring Lil Wayne, Birdman and Euro, "Senile" featuring Tyga, Nicki Minaj and Lil Wayne, "Trophies" featuring Drake and "Lookin Ass" featuring Nicki Minaj.

The album was met with generally mixed reviews from music critics. It debuted at number seven on the Billboard 200 chart, with first-week sales of 32,000 copies in the United States.

== Background ==
On January 22, 2014, Young Money Entertainment's COO Cortez Bryant sent out a press release announcing the second Young Money studio album titled Young Money: Rise of an Empire, and revealing that it would be released on March 11, 2014. It was also reported that Lil Wayne, Nicki Minaj, Shanell, Drake, Tyga, Christina Milian, Gudda Gudda, Lil Twist, and Euro would be featured on the album. In the release it stated,

"We Are Young Money helped launch the careers of our first generation of acts with Drake, Nicki Minaj, and Tyga. Even though we've been honored with accolades as a company, our hunger hasn't diminished or dwindled. We're hungrier than ever, and we're still building. That goes hand-in-hand with the title Young Money: Rise Of An Empire. We're not going anywhere. We don't plan on stopping— ever. Our goal is the expansion of this empire with the next generation of kings and queens ruling."

On January 26, 2014, Birdman told Sway Calloway of MTV News that every artist signed to Young Money would be featured on the album including Lil Chuckee, Austin Mahone and Paris Hilton among others already revealed. The album's cover artwork was revealed on February 15, 2014. The ominous red image displays a moon and clouds with a castle in the distance. On February 22, 2014, the album's track listing was announced, revealing appearances on the final version of the album from Lil Wayne, Drake, Nicki Minaj, Mack Maine, Tyga, Jae Millz, Cory Gunz, Christina Milan, Gudda Gudda, Lil Twist, Shanell, Chanel West Coast, PJ Morton, Euro and Flow. It revealed additional guest appearances outside of Young Money from YG, Meek Mill, Yo Gotti and Birdman.

== Singles ==
On January 22, 2014, Young Money released the album's first single "We Alright", featuring Lil Wayne, Birdman and the label's newest signee Euro. The Colin Tilley-directed music video was released on February 15, 2014. The video features cameo appearances from multiple members of Young Money.

"Senile" originally started as a single for Tyga, who then got Nicki Minaj featured on it, then Lil Wayne. Due to Tyga's fourth studio album not coming out till later in the year, they just decided to release it as a single for the compilation album. On February 10, 2014, Tyga revealed the cover artwork for the D.A. Doman-produced "Senile". He also said that the single would be released on February 17, 2014, however it would be pushed back slightly. Then on February 24, 2014, the song was premiered online as a promotional single. On April 13, 2014, the music video was released for "Senile".

On February 27, 2014, "Trophies" featuring Drake and "Lookin Ass" featuring Nicki Minaj were released as the second and third official singles. Then on March 4, 2014, "Trophies" was serviced to rhythmic contemporary radio in the United States. "Lookin Ass" was then serviced to urban contemporary radio in the United States on March 11, 2014.

== Critical reception ==
Professional ratings
Review scores
Source	Rating
AllMusic	3/5 stars
Exclaim!	4/10
HipHopDX	2.5/5 stars
Now	2/5 stars
Pitchfork Media	4.9/10
Popmatters	5/10 discs
Rolling Stone	2.5/5 stars
XXL	3/5 (L)

Young Money: Rise of an Empire was met with generally mixed reviews from music critics. At Metacritic, which assigns a normalized rating out of 100 to reviews from mainstream critics, the album received an average score of 55, based on 8 reviews, indicating "generally mixed reviews". Melanie Sims of the Associated Press said, "Lil Wayne isn't just the founder of Young Money Cash Money Billionaires, he's the rap squad's captain, too. And on "Rise of an Empire," Weezy plays his role well, anchoring a winning compilation from the camp, and making up for last year's lackluster I Am Not a Human Being II." In closing she said "though Wayne, Drake and Minaj are the star players, their bench-warmers keep it hot." David Jeffries of AllMusic stated, "Call it a wobbly when it comes to quality, or a showcase for the young that's stolen by the old, but it's best to consider it a simple roster-promoting label compilation that just happens to come with an EP or so worth of fire." Sheldon Pearce of XXL said, "Rise Of An Empire is muddled by mid-level talent. The stars shine brightly but their presence is spotty at best. The rest of the roster just doesn't produce in their absence. While We Are Young Money was a semblance of roughly disjointed but mildly enjoyable posse cuts loaded with artists willing to just make their presence felt, Rise Of An Empire feels almost entirely like an album pitching stand-ins as the next wave of world conquering MCs to no avail." However, he praised Lil Wayne, Drake and Nicki Minaj's appearances and the Lil Twist, Tyga and YG collaboration "One Time".

Carrie Battan of Pitchfork Media gave the album a 4.9 out of 10, saying "A DVD released along with the deluxe edition of Nicki Minaj's last album pictures her alongside Wayne, presenting him with a brand new car for his birthday and faithfully referring to him as the President. She and Drake clearly remember the days when they were lucky to have Young Money. Rise of an Empire paints a different picture, one that emphasizes exactly how lucky Young Money is to still have them." Mike Powell of Rolling Stone gave the album two and a half stars out of five, saying "Contractually, Drake and Minaj are here; artistically, they've moved on. And the label's flagship genius, Lil Wayne, is ostentatiously bored: "Have my cake and eat it, too/I want a bakery." That's so half-ass, it's almost funny." Jordan Sowunmi of Now gave the album two out of five stars, saying "The album is bogged down in missteps like Tyga, Lil' Twist and YG's limp One Time and uninspired strip club anthem Back It Up. Wayne, who's been on autopilot the last few years, is spotty again here, delivering a characteristically apathetic verse on the Christina Millian co-starring Video Model, sounding like a man trying to capture the flirty magic of his earlier pop features, but falling painfully short."

Complex named it the twenty-sixth best album of the first half of 2014. Writing for them, Lauren Nostro said, "Intro posse cut "We Alright" bangs, as does "Trophies" and "Lookin Ass." Add strong YG and Meek Mill features, plus a tremendous effort from Wayne on "Moment," and you've got an unlikely success"

== Commercial performance ==
The album debuted at number 7 on the Billboard 200 chart, with first-week sales of 32,000 copies in the United States. In its second week, the album dropped to number 36 on the chart, selling 11,000 more copies. In its third week, the album sold 6,000 more copies. In its fourth week, the album sold 5,100 more copies bringing its total album sales to 53,000 copies.

== Track listing ==
No.	Title	Writer(s)	Producer(s)	Length
1.	"We Alright" (featuring Euro, Birdman and Lil Wayne)	Eufradis Rodriguez; Bryan Williams; Dwayne Carter; Sam Gumbley	S-X	5:12
2.	"Trophies" (featuring Drake)	Aubrey Graham; Chauncey Hollis; Marvin Thomas; Noah Shebib	Hit-Boy; 40; Hagler	3:08
3.	"Bang" (featuring Lil Twist, Euro and Cory Gunz)	Christopher Lynn Moore; Rodriguez; Peter Cory Pankey; Sonny Uwaezuoke	Sonny Digital	4:10
4.	"Senile" (featuring Tyga, Nicki Minaj and Lil Wayne)	Michael Stevenson; Onika Maraj; Carter; David Lewis Doman	David D.A. Doman	3:19 by Colin Tilley ©️ 2014 Cash Money Records, Inc.
5.	"Induction Speech" (featuring Euro)	Rodriguez; Michael Joshua Fonseca	Omega	5:21
6.	"One Time" (featuring Lil Twist, Tyga and YG)	Moore; Stevenson; Keenon Jackson; Jess Jackson; Andrew Harr; Jermaine Jackson	Jess Jackson; The Runners	4:21
7.	"Hittin Like" (featuring Shanell and Chanel West Coast)	Shanell Woodgett; Chelsea Dudley; Aaron O'Brien	Aaron O'Brien	2:42
8.	"Lookin Ass" (featuring Nicki Minaj)	Maraj; Noel Fisher; Kemion Johnel Cooks	Detail; Choppa Boi	2:41
9.	"Fresher Than Ever" (featuring Gudda Gudda, Jae Millz, Flow, Mack Maine and Birdman)	Carl Lilly; Jarvis Mills; Widner DeGruy; Jermaine Preyan; B. Williams; B. Parker; D. Stokes; B. Wicker; A. Reid; J. Jame	The Olympicks	6:46
10.	"Back It Up" (featuring Lil Twist and Tyga)	Moore; Stevenson; Lexus Lewis	Lex Luger	3:34
11.	"Moment" (featuring Lil Wayne)	Carter; Anthony Norris	Lee on the Beats	4:39
12.	"You Already Know" (featuring PJ Morton, Jae Millz, Gudda Gudda and Mack Maine)	Paul Morton; Mills; Lilly; Preyan	PJ Morton	4:09

Deluxe edition bonus tracks
No.	Title	Writer(s)	Producer(s)	Length
13.	"Catch Me at the Light" (featuring Shanell and Yo Gotti)	Shanell Woodgett; Mario Mims; Harvey Miller; Jirou Anderson Williams	DJ Speedy	3:28
14.	"Video Model" (featuring Christina Milian and Lil Wayne)	Carl Devonish; Cameron Wallace; Kalenna Harper; Anthony Vick	Big A Music; The Agency	3:58
15.	"Good Day" (featuring Tyga, Meek Mill and Lil Wayne)	Stevenson; Robert Williams; Carter; Diome Silva; Donte Blacksher	DNYC3 of League of Starz	3:44

Notes

- "Hittin Like" featuring Shanell and Chanel West Coast is only featured on the physical edition of the album.

== Personnel ==
Album credits adapted from AllMusic.

- Chris Athens – mastering
- Joshua Berkman – A&R
- Michael Brady – A&R
- Birdman – featured artist
- Sandy Brummels – art direction
- Cortez Bryant – executive producer
- Sean Buchanan – mixing assistant, recording assistant
- Noel Cadastre – engineer, mixing assistant
- Noel "Gadget" Campbell – mixing
- Dwayne Carter – executive producer
- Chanel West Coast – featured artist
- Ariel Chobaz – engineer, mixing
- Kemion Johnel Cooks – producer
- Aubry "Big Juice" Delaine – mixing
- Detail – mixing, producer
- Sonny Digital – producer
- David D.A. Doman – producer
- Drake – featured artist
- Euro – featured artist
- Steve Fisher – engineer
- Flow – featured artist
- Goe – engineer
- Gudda Gudda – featured artist
- Cory Gunz – featured artist
- Hagler – producer
- Hit Boy – producer
- Jess Jackson – engineer, mixing, producer
- Brandon Jones – engineer
- Lee on the Beats – producer
- Edward "Jewfro" Lidow – engineer
- Lil' Twist – featured artist
- Lil Wayne – featured artist
- Lex Luger – producer
- Mack Maine – executive producer, featured artist
- Fabian Marasciullo – mixing
- Jae Millz – featured artist
- Nicki Minaj – featured artist
- PJ Morton – featured artist, producer
- Aaron O'Brien – producer
- The Olympicks – producer
- Omega – producer
- Jermaine Preyan – A&R
- Andy Rodriguez – engineer, recording assistant
- The Runners – producer
- Fareed Salamah – engineer
- Shanell – featured artist
- Noah Shebib – engineer, mixing, producer
- Olivia Smith – art direction, package design
- Joe Spix – hand lettering
- Evan Stewart – recording assistant
- S-X – producer
- Jeffrey Tanner – mixing assistant
- Tyga – featured artist
- B. Wicker – composer
- Bryan Williams – composer
- Bryan "Baby Birdman" Williams – executive producer
- Ronald "Slim Tha Don" Williams – executive producer
- Shanell Woodgett – composer
- YG – featured artist
- Young Money – primary artist

== Chart positions ==
=== Weekly charts ===
Chart (2014)	Peak position
Canadian Albums (Billboard)	24
UK Albums Chart (The Official Charts Company)	148
UK R&B Albums (Official Charts)	18
US Billboard 200	7
US Top R&B/Hip-Hop Albums (Billboard)	4
US Top Rap Albums (Billboard)	2

=== Year-end charts ===
Chart (2014)	Position
US Top R&B/Hip-Hop Albums (Billboard)	46
