= Pull Up wit ah Stick =

2016 single by SahBabii featuring Loso Loaded

Single by SahBabii featuring Loso Loaded

from the album S.A.N.D.A.S.
- Released: September 28, 2016
- Recorded: March 2016
- Length: 3:48
- Label: Casting Bait; Warner
- Songwriter(s): Saaheem Valdery; Letrell Reynolds; Shéyaa Abraham-Joseph; Jeffery Williams; Sonny Uwaezuoke; Wesley Glass
- Producer(s): Lil Voe

SahBabii singles chronology
"Gotta Pay" (2015)	"Pull Up wit ah Stick" (2016)	"Purple Ape" (2016)

Loso Loaded singles chronology
"Extortion" (2016)	"Pull Up wit ah Stick" (2016)	"Marsupial Superstars" (2017)

Music video
- "Pull Up wit ah Stick" on YouTube

"Pull Up wit ah Stick" is a song by American rapper SahBabii, released on September 28, 2016, from his mixtape S.A.N.D.A.S. (2016). It features American rapper Loso Loaded and was produced by Lil Voe. The song gained recognition in 2017 and is considered SahBabii's breakout hit.

== Background ==
In an interview with XXL, SahBabii spoke about composing the song: "'Pull Up wit ah Stick', the beat was a vibe, it was just bangin' hard and I just started singing, 'Pull up wit ah stick, let it hit,' and I put that on there. Then I heard how the hook was going and it needed some adlibs so I put the bird noises on there because I'm a big fan of animals." He recorded the song along with the rest of S.A.N.D.A.S. on Cubase using a broken microphone in his brother T3's bedroom, in March 2016. In 2017, SahBabii posted a 15-second clip of the song on Instagram, from which it went viral.

The beat was originally posted on YouTube. After coming across the song on Instagram, Lil Voe contacted SahBabii to work with him.

== Composition ==
The production contains synthesizers, as well as large portions with no drums. SahBabii performs in Auto-Tuned vocals, with a repetition of "ooh-ooh" in the background.

== Music video ==
An official music video was released in February 2017. Filmed in Atlanta's Ninth Ward, it shows SahBabii and others holding guns and giving the finger.

A second music video was released on May 18, 2017. Shot in black-and-white, it sees SahBabii performing in concerts, meeting with fans, throwing money at the crowd, walking around and hanging out with his crew, and riding expensive cars.

== Remixes ==
The song has been remixed by several artists, including Fetty Wap, T-Pain and Wiz Khalifa. An official remix of the song was released on June 9, 2017, and features American rapper Young Thug, who sings about shooting his enemies and shrimp in his pasta.

In 2017, SahBabii announced that Canadian rapper Drake told him he was recording a verse for a remix of the song, but the remix was never released.

== Charts ==
Chart (2017)	Peak position
US Bubbling Under Hot 100 (Billboard)	3
US Hot R&B/Hip-Hop Songs (Billboard)	47

== Certifications ==
Region	Certification	Certified units/sales
United States (RIAA)	Platinum	1,000,000^{‡}
^{‡} Sales+streaming figures based on certification alone.
