= ColleGrove =

Studio album by 2 Chainz
- Released: March 4, 2016
- Recorded: 2015–2016
- Studios: TRU Motivation Studio (Davie, Florida); Deuce Station (Atlanta, Georgia); Hit Factory Criteria (Miami, Florida); KY's Bedroom (Atlanta, Georgia); Street Execs Studios (Atlanta, Georgia); Just Us Studios (Los Angeles, California); 2-17 Studios (Atlanta, Georgia); NightBird Recording Studios (West Hollywood, California)
- Genres: Hip-hop; trap
- Length: 47:32
- Labels: The Real University; Def Jam
- Producers: Ben Billions; Bobby Kritical; FKi; Honorable C.N.O.T.E.; Mike Dean; Frank Dukes; Infamous; Mike Will Made It; The Mad Violinist; TM88; Zaytoven; Lil' C; Metro Boomin; T@; London on da Track; Southside; Reignman Rich; Mannie Fresh; Mr. 2-17

2 Chainz chronology
Trap-A-Velli Tre (2015)	ColleGrove (2016)	Daniel Son; Necklace Don (2016)

Lil Wayne chronology
No Ceilings 2 (2015)	ColleGrove (2016)	T-Wayne (2017)

ColleGrove is the third studio album by American rapper 2 Chainz. It was released on March 4, 2016, by his label The Real University and Def Jam Recordings. The album is a collaborative effort between him and fellow American rapper Lil Wayne, but due to the latter's record label issues, only 2 Chainz was credited as the primary artist.

The album includes production from several high-profile record producers; such as Southside, Mike Will Made It, TM88, Infamous, Zaytoven, Lil' C, Metro Boomin, Ben Billions and London on da Track, among others. ColleGrove received generally positive reviews from critics and it debuted at number four on the US Billboard 200 chart. A sequel, Welcome 2 ColleGrove was announced and was released on November 17, 2023.

== Background ==
ColleGrove was initially a duet album between Southern hip-hop recording artists 2 Chainz and Lil Wayne, however, because of Wayne's label issues, which had prevented him from releasing collaborative efforts in the past, such as I Can't Feel My Face with Juelz Santana, Best of Young Worlds with Lloyd, He Rap, He Sing with T-Pain and more, this album does not credit Wayne as a primary artist. Although it could not be released in conjunction with their respective record labels, 2 Chainz took it upon himself to release the album as his latest solo project through Def Jam Recordings. Instead, Wayne appeared as a "featured artist", courtesy of Cash Money Records, which meant that the project would not count towards Wayne's contractual obligation with Cash Money Records. 2 Chainz would later refer to this album in several interviews as a "tribute" to Lil Wayne.

The album's title is a portmanteau of 2 Chainz and Lil Wayne's respective hometowns. 2 Chainz is from College Park, Georgia, while Wayne hails from Hollygrove, a neighborhood in New Orleans, Louisiana. On December 28, 2015, in an interview with Forbes, 2 Chainz spoke on album, saying "As far as the ColleGrove project, I really feel like the music is tight and accessible. Wayne has always been one of my favorite rappers. We’re just doing some mixing and trying to grind up. Just know that ColleGrove is coming very soon, and it’s going to be filled with entertainment bars, great sounds, great vibes."

== Release and promotion ==
In 2013, it was first rumored that both Lil Wayne and 2 Chainz released their single, titled "Twerk Season". In November 2015, 2 Chainz revealed that he was working on a collaborative album with New Orleans-bred rapper Lil Wayne, on the Rap Radar podcast. "I've got ColleGrove, that I'm working on", he said at the time. "That's the me and Wayne project. That will be out, probably sooner than people think." In December 2015, 2 Chainz and the Street Execs were hosting their sixth annual Street Execs Charity Concert, to give back to the community, where 2 Chainz previewed one of the songs from the album. On February 21, 2016, there was some indication about Mannie Fresh played a role for this album. On his Instagram account, he posted a mock cover and some pictures with himself and Lil Wayne over the few weeks preceding the album's release. On February 15, 2 Chainz and Lil Wayne performed the first song, "Rolls Royce Weather Everyday" on The Tonight Show Starring Jimmy Fallon. The preview for the music video, which was shot in Los Angeles, California, was released via YouTube. On February 20, according to Complex, Mack Maine said that the CDQ version on the song was going to be released soon.

On March 2, 2016, Kanye West revealed the album's artwork and the release date, via Twitter. On March 3, the song, titled "Gotta Lotta" was premiered by Zane Lowe on Beats 1. On the same day, 2 Chainz tweeted that the album would be released on midnight. Earlier that day, DJ Khaled played some snippets of one of the songs on the album on Snapchat, but only played Wayne's verse. Later that night, 2 Chainz streamed the album on "ColleGrove Radio" on Beats 1 with DJ Drama, DJ E-Sudd, DJ Self and Mannie Fresh. He and Lil Wayne revealed a teaser for the music video of "Bounce" that same day and the official video was released the next day. Shooting for two songs, "Gotta Lotta" and "MFN Right" have been shot and produced by Street Execs' new production company #WeHardProductions.

== Critical reception ==
Professional ratings
Aggregate scores
Source	Rating
Metacritic	66/100
Review scores
Source	Rating
Exclaim!	6/10
HipHopDX	3.8/5
Pitchfork	6.8/10
Pretty Much Amazing	C
Rolling Stone	3/5 stars
Spin	7/10
XXL	3/5 (L)

ColleGrove has received generally positive reviews from music critics. The New York Times spoke on Wayne's involvement on the project "His best verses here are his most spirited rapping in at least two years. Consider the context, though. "Collegrove" isn't even a full collaborative album, but a 2 Chainz album on which he plays sidekick. (There it is in the credits: "Lil Wayne appears courtesy of Cash Money Records Inc.") 2 Chainz is an ornery rapper, occasionally stumbling into vivid word clouds. Every time he heads in an unexpected direction here, Lil Wayne seems eager to step up to the challenge. Even his throwaway lines — "Asinine/ I get blow like dandelions" — have the eyebrow-arching zing of his prime. Maybe some time away from the spotlight has calmed him. Maybe the seeming détente in his relationship with Baby has freed him. Or maybe appearing on someone else's album, rather than his own, has allowed him to be loose once more."

Patrick Lyons of HotNewHipHop described it as 'A trap buddy comedy' and Trevor Smith said, "Throughout his many memorable features, 2 Chainz has generally been recruited as the wild card, but on "Collegrove," he's the straight man, keeping the project together with his reliable ear for beats and earworm-driven songwriting. Meanwhile, Wayne plays the Ghostface to Chainz' Raekwon, bringing an unpredictable and unmatched energy to each of his appearances, but with just enough restraint to keep him on the same page as his collaborator. Not every punch lands directly, but when the two rappers find the sweet spot of their compatibility (the punchline one-upmanship of "Bounce" or the perfect ad-lib dynamic of "Blue C-Note") it brings out the best of both artists. Both Wayne and Chainz have been known to giggle at their own wordplay, and anytime the pure unfiltered joy they find in rapping is audible on the album, everyone wins." awarding the album 79/100.

Stereogum awarded the album Album of the Week.

== Commercial performance ==
ColleGrove debuted at number four on the US Billboard 200, earning 53,000 album-equivalent units (including 34,000 copies as pure album sales) in its first week. This became 2 Chainz's third US top-ten debut.

== Track listing ==
Standard edition
No.	Title	Writer(s)	Producer(s)	Length
1.	"Dedication"	Tauheed Epps; Joshua Luellen; Michael Dean	Southside; Dean^{[a]}	4:59
2.	"Smell Like Money" (featuring Lil Wayne)	Epps; Dwayne Carter, Jr.; Carlton Mays, Jr.	Honorable C.N.O.T.E.	4:50
3.	"Bounce" (featuring Lil Wayne)	Epps; Carter, Jr.; Marco Rodriguez-Diaz; Terry Bourgeois	Infamous; T@	4:16
4.	"Gotta Lotta" (featuring Lil Wayne)	Epps; Carter, Jr.; Byron Thomas; John Larkin; Antonio Catania	Mannie Fresh	3:36
5.	"MFN Right"	Epps; Michael Williams; Xavier Dotson	Mike Will Made It; Zaytoven	3:25
6.	"Blue C-Note" (featuring Lil Wayne)	Epps; Carter, Jr.; Nosakhere Andrews	Mr. 2-17	2:51
7.	"Not Invited"	Epps; Bryan Simmons; Richaud Daughtry; Robert Walker	TM88; Reignman Rich	3:17
8.	"Bentley Truck" (featuring Lil Wayne)	Epps; Carter, Jr.; Leland Wayne; Adam Feeney	Metro Boomin; Frank Dukes	4:39
9.	"100 Joints"	Epps; Bobby Turner	Bobby Kritical	3:39
10.	"Rolls Royce Weather Everyday" (featuring Lil Wayne)	Epps; Carter, Jr.; Darwin Quinn; Ashanti Floyd; Earl Conyers; Gabriel Arillo	Lil' C; The Mad Violinist^{[a]}	3:07
11.	"What Happened" (featuring Lil Wayne)	Epps; Carter, Jr.; Benjamin Diehl; Khaled Khaled; Angus McDonald	Ben Billions	4:58
12.	"Section" (featuring Lil Wayne)	Epps; Carter, Jr.; London Holmes	London on da Track	3:55
Total length:				47:32

iTunes deluxe edition bonus track
No.	Title	Writer(s)	Producer(s)	Length
13.	"Watch Out"	Epps; Trocon Roberts	FKi	3:27
Total length:				50:59

Notes

- ^{^[a]} signifies an additional producer
- "MFN Right" and "Not Invited" were initially included on 2 Chainz' mixtape Felt Like Cappin
- "Watch Out" was initially included on 2 Chainz' mixtape Trapavelli Tre

Sample credits

- "Gotta Lotta" contains interpolations from "Scatman (Ski Ba Bop Ba Dop Bop)", written by John Larkin and Antonio Catania.
- "Rolls Royce Weather Everyday" contains interpolations from the "Big Dawg", written by Earl Conyers, Tauheed Epps, Gabriel Arillo and Dwayne Carter, Jr.
- "What Happened" contains a sample of "I Love It (Acoustic Version)" performed by Sneaky Sound System.

== Charts ==
=== Weekly charts ===
Weekly chart performance for ColleGrove
Chart (2016)	Peak position
Canadian Albums (Billboard)	20
US Billboard 200	4
US Top R&B/Hip-Hop Albums (Billboard)	2

=== Year-end charts ===
Year-end chart performance for ColleGrove
Chart (2016)	Position
US Billboard 200	174
US Top R&B/Hip-Hop Albums (Billboard)	39

== Release history ==
Release history for ColleGrove
Region	Date	Format	Label	Ref.
United States	March 4, 2016	Digital download	Def Jam	
United States	March 25, 2016	CD	Def Jam	
