= Tha Carter V =

Studio album by Lil Wayne
- Released: September 27, 2018
- Recorded: 2012–2018
- Genre: Hip-hop
- Length: 87:43
- Labels: Young Money; Universal
- Producers: Lil Wayne (exec.); 808-Ray; Ace Harris; Avenue; Ben Billions; Bloque; Joshua Ard; Cool & Dre; DJ Mustard; Drtwrk; Freeway TJay; Infamous; Jonah Christian; Johnny Yukon; Kamo; Louie Haze; Hoodybaby; Mannie Fresh; Metro Boomin; Mike Free; Myles William; Onhel; Prince85; Reefa; R!O; Roc N Mayne; Sham "Sak Pase" Joseph; Sevn Thomas; Tay Keith; Swizz Beatz; Thomas Troelsen; Z3N; Zaytoven

Lil Wayne chronology
Dedication 6 (2018)	Tha Carter V (2018)	Funeral (2020)

Tha Carter albums chronology
Tha Carter IV (2011)	Tha Carter V (2018)	Tha Carter VI (2025)

Singles from The Carter V
- 1. "Uproar" Released: October 5, 2018; 2. "Don't Cry" Released: January 3, 2019

Deluxe edition cover

Tha Carter V is the twelfth studio album by American rapper Lil Wayne. It was released on September 27, 2018, by Young Money Entertainment and Universal Music Distribution. The album's release date coincided with the day of Lil Wayne's 36th birthday. The album's features include Swizz Beatz, Kendrick Lamar, Sosamann, Lil Wayne's daughter Reginae Carter, Snoop Dogg, Nicki Minaj, Ashanti, Mack Maine, Travis Scott, Nivea, and the late XXXTentacion, with bonus tracks and the deluxe edition featuring additional appearances from Post Malone, Gucci Mane, Raekwon, and 2 Chainz.

Originally planned to be released in 2014, Tha Carter V experienced several delays as a result of contractual disputes between Lil Wayne and Cash Money Records, as well as his numerous personal disputes with label-head, Birdman. Following a lengthy legal battle, Lil Wayne was confirmed to have been released from his contract with Cash Money in June 2018 and announced the release of the album in September. The album received generally positive reviews and debuted at number one on the Billboard 200 with the second-largest streaming week for an album of all time and with 480,000 units sold.

On September 13, 2019, 20 songs from the original version of Tha Carter V were leaked online, containing many unreleased tracks compared to the official version of Carter V that was released in 2018.

A deluxe edition was released on September 25, 2020, to celebrate the album's second anniversary; it consists of songs that did not make the original album.

== Background ==
In November 2012, Lil Wayne announced Tha Carter V would be his final album; he previously stated he would retire at the age of 35; he explained that he had four kids and he "would feel selfish still going to the studio when it's such a vital point in their lives". In April 2014, Wayne addressed his Carter V release:

I personally plan on this being my final solo album, yes, and it's definitely the final Carter album. It's the final Carter album. It's stopping at five. I didn't smile when I said it...I plan on it being my final solo album. Whenever I have to pitch in for a Young Money album, a Like Father, Like Son album and something like that and maybe something out the blue, but the way I'm working on this album, it's to me, the way it seems like now, it seems like it'll be impossible for me to work this hard again for anything else.

In May 2014, when asked about Tha Carter V, Lil Wayne said the album is all about "growth" and that his music is "supposed to be personal":

Tha Carter V is about growth, flat-out. My thoughts are wiser. I still say what I want to say—it just sounds better and makes more sense. That all comes with growth and maturity. I never try to send messages through music. Music is about self. It's supposed to be personal, a reflection of me, unless you have somebody writing it for you, and everybody know I'm not that artist. I'm not sending a message because that message may not get across. Whatever message you take from it is your choice.

In July 2014, in an interview with XXL, he spoke about the album, saying:

I was feeling the success of Tha Carter I. I felt like people wanted to hear me. I was amped to do that, but then Tha Carter III? I don't know what happened. It was amazing. And then Tha Carter IV was just unexplainable, and now this one here, there are no words. I just hope everyone likes it. I'm always feeling like I ain't done shit. I'm still nervous about Tha Carter V...But I'm confident about what I do, though I'm still nervous about what people think.

In September 2019, 25 songs from the original version of Tha Carter V leaked.

== Recording and production ==
In May 2014, Lil Wayne's longtime record producer, former Cash Money artist Mannie Fresh, announced he would be reuniting with Wayne on Tha Carter V. The collaboration marks the first time in 10 years that Fresh and Wayne worked together, not since 2004, when Wayne released Tha Carter and Fresh subsequently severed ties with the Cash Money Records. Also in May 2014, Atlanta-based rapper and producer Soulja Boy, who previously produced "Wowzerz" from I Am Not a Human Being II (2013) for Lil Wayne, announced he was working with Wayne on the fifth installment of Tha Carter series. In June 2014, Atlanta-based record producer Mike Will Made It, revealed "I got three records with Lil Wayne for Tha Carter V". In July 2014, Lil Wayne's frequent collaborator DVLP confirmed he had produced songs for Tha Carter V. While on the red carpet of the 2014 MTV Video Music Awards in California on August 24, West Coast hip-hop producer DJ Mustard confirmed to MTV that Lil Wayne will be rapping over one of his beats on the album. In April 2016, New York-based record producer Myles William, revealed to the Arizona State Press, that he would produce a track for Tha Carter V.

A number of songs from Tha Carter V were recorded years before the album's release. "Mona Lisa" featuring Kendrick Lamar was recorded in 2014 and was intended to be on the 2014 release of the album. The song was teased after Martin Shkreli was able to acquire the project in 2016 and the song was played on livestream. The song "What About Me" originally featured Drake and was recorded in 2015. Post Malone was originally scheduled to be added to the song in the week before release, but didn't make to the album's initial release, possibly due to the verse not being finished. The song ended up with Sosamann on it, with the Post Malone version later being placed in the album's bonus tracks.

Tha Carter V was mastered by Colin Leonard at SING Mastering, and was mixed by Fabian Marasciullo. According to recording engineer Manny Galvez, the song "Dedicate" took Wayne no longer than 15 or 20 minutes to record.

== Release and promotion ==
In July 2012, Lil Wayne said that the album would be released in 2013. On October 18, 2013, Cash Money Records' Vice President of Promotion Mel Smith, tweeted: "Happy Friday!! New YMCMB music coming soon!! Carter 5." On February 10, 2014, Lil Wayne's Young Money signee, Canadian recording artist Drake, tweeted "CARTER V". On February 15, 2014, during the NBA All-Star Weekend festivities at Sprite's NBA All-Star concert at the House of Blues in New Orleans, Lil Wayne appeared as a special guest during Drake's set and performed various hits. Wayne and Drake then broke the news that Tha Carter V was set to be released on May 5, 2014. On March 27, 2014, Wayne's manager Cortez Bryant announced that the album had been delayed.

On April 28, 2014, Los Angeles Lakers basketball player Kobe Bryant revealed what some speculated would be Tha Carter V album cover, via online photo-sharing and social networking service Instagram. Talking with ESPN, Wayne spoke about using athletes to promote the album, such as Kobe Bryant: "'Carter V Season' was all Kobe," Lil Wayne said when asked about Bryant's contribution. "He came up with it. I saw that and thought, 'That's dope as hell,' so that's what we're calling the [album] campaign. I thanked him. Then we thought about Floyd." In July 2014, in an interview with MTV News, Wayne spoke about when the album would be released, saying: "I'm so not good with that. I think it drops either in September and then we have...ah I can't tell you the sneak thing. Anyway, yeah, I think it drops in September or August."

From August to September 2014, Lil Wayne embarked on a concert tour alongside Drake, billed Drake vs. Lil Wayne. On August 14, 2014, Lil Wayne appeared on ESPN's First Take, where he unveiled the cover art for Tha Carter V, which features Wayne's mother: "It's perfect," Wayne said. "I always go with a baby picture. I wanted to go with one with my mama this time...To have my mom on there is more than an accomplishment. It's an achievement." During the ESPN interview, Wayne also announced that the album would be released on October 28, 2014. On October 28, 2014, Wayne released a Public Service Announcement (PSA), where he revealed the album had been delayed due to the album's tentative track list having over 31 songs. During the PSA, he stated that he worked too hard and refuses to cheat his fans and himself, therefore he came up with a way to give his fans every song he has recorded for the album, announcing: "the first part of the Carter V album will be dropping December 9. Stay tuned for the next part of the album".

On December 4, 2014, just five days before the album was due to be released, Wayne issued a statement saying the album would not be released on its expected release date, due to his displeasure with Cash Money Records label-boss Birdman not wanting to release the album although it had been completed. Wayne also expressed his feelings by stating he felt both he and his creativity were being held "prisoner". On January 20, 2015, Wayne self-released Sorry 4 the Wait 2, a mixtape to compensate for the continued delay of Tha Carter V. It is the sequel to 2011's Sorry 4 the Wait, which served the same purpose during the delay of his ninth album, Tha Carter IV (2011). Upon Sorry for the Wait 2's release, it was noted Wayne disses Birdman and Cash Money Records several times throughout the mixtape. Birdman was reported to be upset with this.

Despite his legal battle with Cash Money, during the time when the album was in flux, Lil Wayne claimed to have authority over when and how the album got released. He spoke in an interview at the time, stating: "Of course you're going to see Tha Carter V. I just don't want to put it out the wrong way. Honestly, I can do what I want at any time. The fans deserve it to be right and that's how it's gonna be. I'ma make sure it's right. I can drop whatever I want to drop. That's why I keep dropping whatever I want to drop. But I'm not gonna give them Carter V the wrong way."

On Thursday, September 27, 2018, the day of the rapper's 36th birthday, the album was released.

Wayne appeared on The Tonight Show Starring Jimmy Fallon, and played the song "Dedicate".

On November 10, 2018, Wayne released 3 additional songs, "What About Me (feat. Post Malone)," "Hasta La Vista," and "In This House (featuring Gucci Mane)."

On November 10, 2018, Lil Wayne performed two songs, "Can't Be Broken" with surprise guest Halsey and "Uproar" with Swizz Beatz, from the album on Saturday Night Live. On December 13, 2018, Lil Wayne performed "Don't Cry" on Late Show with Stephen Colbert and paid homage to rapper XXXTentacion.

== Critical reception ==
Professional ratings
Aggregate scores
Source	Rating
AnyDecentMusic?	6.8/10
Metacritic	72/100
Review scores
Source	Rating
AllMusic	3.5/5 stars
The A.V. Club	B
Clash	8/10
Entertainment Weekly	B−
Exclaim!	7/10
NME	3/5 stars
The Observer	3/5 stars
Pitchfork	7.4/10
Rolling Stone	3.5/5 stars
XXL	4/5

Tha Carter V received generally positive reviews from critics, with many considering it to be his best album since Tha Carter III but criticizing its length. At Metacritic, which assigns a normalized rating out of 100 to reviews from mainstream publications, the album received an average score of 72, based on fourteen reviews. A.D. Amorosi of Variety gave a very positive review, writing, "Musically, despite the age of some of the songs, V is fresh, flush and even frenetic at times, with the crunch of the Southern trap and ropey rap-rock sounds that Wayne pretty much started in the first place." Evan Rytlewski of Pitchfork said, "The long-delayed album captures Wayne how we want to remember him: openhearted, word-drunk, and exhilarated by the possibilities of his own versatility", and that "the most surprising takeaway from Tha Carter V, it turns out, isn't that Wayne still has music this vital in him. It's that after all these years, there's still more to learn about him."

Hanif Abdurraqib of Entertainment Weekly said, "Wayne is, by nature, an exciting rapper. His breathless, consistently accelerating flow is still present here, though not varied enough to work as well as it once did back in the day." Mitch Findlay of HotNewHipHop said, "Tha Carter V seemed destined for anticlimax. Luckily, Weezy made sure to revisit his project with modern sensibilities, imbuing the album with a sense of wisdom he may not possessed upon its initial conception. As a result, Tha Carter V feels insightful enough to appease those seeking something new from Wayne, while staying familiar enough for the ones who simply missed the flourishment of rap's elder statesman." Mosi Reeves from Rolling Stone said, "It's an album full of poignant bars, fire, and passion from an artist who doesn't have anything left to prove", and that "Tha Carter V can't compare to the first three point five Carter installments, or his epochal 2005–2007 mixtape run. But it doesn't need to." Thomas Hobbs from Highsnobiety said, “It might not be the best in the Carter series, but it's potentially the most important, paving the way for a new chapter in Weezy's career where more philosophical lyricism should allow him to transition into the role of a rap elder statesman, a lot like JAY-Z did with 4:44. Tha Carter V is a testament to the notion that when its creator is feeling up to the task, he has the look and feel of one of the greats.”

The staff of XXL magazine said, "The album is indeed, as much for the journey that led to its release as the previously unseen layers that Weezy reveals." Erin Hannon from Exclaim! said, "Relationships with women are at the forefront of Tha Carter V, including a desperate cry for help from his mother on "I Love You Dwayne," which leads into the sorrowful "Don't Cry," featuring a chorus from the late XXXTENTACION. ... Despite the revelations, the album is not without its expected bangers." Andy Kellman of AllMusic said, "Almost 90 minutes in length, it's pieced together with material recorded from years to weeks ahead of release, and one cut goes back to resemble an early-2000s crossover bid, from its smoothly melodic Mannie Fresh production to its Ashanti hook. A greater portion forms a sluggish, indistinct mass... For all the excess and buildup, this exhibits Wayne on an upswing, lucid and invigorated."

However, Jordan Bassett of NME gave the album a more mixed review, stating that "It could have been his emotional swansong, and much of this long-delayed album is an elegiac homage to Lil Wayne's outlier status as an elder statesman of hip-hop. Sadly, he cheapens himself on Tha Carter V", later clarifying the reason as 'misogyny'". Jon Sorentino Caramanica from The New York Times said, "Excess bravado was always a part of his proposition, but this album drags and seeps, with long stretches of shrugs in between moments of invention." Lil Wayne can still spew bars with dizzying dexterity, but his self-editing isn't great; there are terrific beats (Uproar) and lame ones (Took His Time). Mona Lisa is a piece of storytelling noir in which Wayne goes head-to-head with Kendrick Lamar, and does not come out lacking. It's not that C5 is too little, too late; more that the baton between the generations passed some time ago.

=== Accolades ===
Year-end lists
Publication	List	Rank
Billboard	50 Best Albums of 2018	18
Complex	50 Best Albums of 2018	18
Resident Entertainment	Biggest Album Debuts of 2018	3
Okayplayer	The Best Albums of 2018	18
Vibe	30 Best Albums of 2018	15
Rolling Stone	Hip-Hop Albums: 30 Best Of 2018	9

== Commercial performance ==
Tha Carter V debuted at number one on the US Billboard 200 with 480,000 album-equivalent units, including 140,000 pure album sales. It had the second-largest streaming week for an album with 433 million streams. Upon release of the album, Lil Wayne became the first artist to debut 2 songs in the top 5 of the Billboard Hot 100. The record is also Lil Wayne's fourth US number-one album. It is his third album to top Canadian Albums Chart, opening at number one there with 24,000 consumption units. As of November 18, 2018, Tha Carter V has sold one million album-equivalent units in the United States.

Across Europe, the album debuted at number 5 on the UK Albums Chart, giving Wayne his highest-charting album in the United Kingdom. The album was equally successful in some others European countries including Northern countries (Lithuania, Sweden, Norway, Denmark, Ireland and the Netherlands), where the album debuted within the top ten and equally in Slovakia and Belgium, top twenty in Switzerland, Finland, Italy and Austria, top thirty an in Czech Republic and top forty in Germany. It was less successful in France and Scotland, where the album peaked in both of countries at number 49.

After the album's release on September 28, one of its hit singles, "Uproar", had sparked a viral dance challenge shortly after. Notable celebrities and Internet stars had participated in this challenge, such as Diddy, Swizz Beatz, Shiggy, and Lil Wayne's daughter, Reginae Carter.

== Track listing ==
Credits adapted from Tidal, ASCAP and BMI.

No.	Title	Writer(s)	Producer(s)	Length
1.	"I Love You Dwayne"	Jacida Carter		2:00
2.	"Don't Cry" (featuring XXXTentacion)	Dwayne Carter, Jr.; Jahseh Onfroy; Juan Guerrieri-Maril; Benjamin Diehl; Gamal Lewis	Ben Billions; Z3N	4:09
3.	"Dedicate"	D. Carter; Manny Galvez; Corbin Roe; Willber Vincent; Adolfo Ramirez; Michael Dean; Tauheed Epps; Joshua Luellen	Galvez; Roc & Mayne; Louie Haze	3:09
4.	"Uproar" (featuring Swizz Beatz)	D. Carter; Kasseem Dean; Avery Chambliss; Edward Holland; Lamont Herbert Dozier; Brian Holland	Swizz Beatz; Avenue^{[a]}	3:13
5.	"Let It Fly" (featuring Travis Scott)	D. Carter; Jacques Webster II; Rupert Thomas, Jr.; Michal Suski	Sevn Thomas; Drtwrk	3:06
6.	"Can't Be Broken"	D. Carter; Diehl; Lewis; Thomas Troelsen	Ben Billions; Thomas Troelsen	3:13
7.	"Dark Side of the Moon" (featuring Nicki Minaj)	D. Carter; Onika Maraj; Jamal Reid; Jonah Christian	Bloque; Christian^{[a]}	4:02
8.	"Mona Lisa" (featuring Kendrick Lamar)	D. Carter; Kendrick Duckworth; Marco Rodriguez; Angel Aponte	Infamous; Onhel^{[a]}	5:24
9.	"What About Me" (featuring Sosamann)	D. Carter; John Mitchell; Justin Franks; Jahkoy Palmer; Louis Bell; Billy Walsh; Jermaine Preyan; Anthony Denson	Johnny Yukon; DJ Frank E	3:36
10.	"Open Letter"	D. Carter; M. Rodriguez; Diehl	Infamous; Ben Billions; Nick the Piff	4:29
11.	"Famous" (featuring Reginae Carter)	D. Carter; Reginae Carter; Shama Joseph; Lasanna Harris; Sam Bruno	Sham "Sak Pase" Joseph; Harris	4:02
12.	"Problems"	D. Carter; Xavier Dotson	Zaytoven	3:28
13.	"Dope Niggaz" (featuring Snoop Dogg)	D. Carter; Mario Jefferson; Darius Ginn, Jr.; Brian Bailey; Ricardo Brown; Nathaniel Hale; Isaac Hayes; Craig Longmiles; Andre Young	R!O; Kamo^{[a]}	3:25
14.	"Hittas"	D. Carter; Andrew Jones; Maurice Jordan; Tasha Baxter; Andre Scheepers; Torrence Hatch; Robert Gonzalez; Taquari Hatch	Jayones; Infamous^{[b]}	3:43
15.	"Took His Time"	D. Carter; Tony Walker, Jr.; Stephen McDowell	FreewayTJay; Fatboymixx; Infamous^{[b]}	4:22
16.	"Open Safe"	D. Carter; Mikely Adams; Dijon McFarlane	DJ Mustard; Mikely "Mike Free" Adams	3:43
17.	"Start This Shit Off Right" (featuring Ashanti and Mack Maine)	D. Carter; Ashanti Douglas; Preyan; Byron Thomas; Robert Reed; Tony Fisher; James Avery	Mannie Fresh	4:40
18.	"Demon"	D. Carter; Marcello Valenzano; Andre Lyon; Rayshon Cobbs, Jr.; Don Taylor; Ted Kay; Leo Daniels; Ben Daniels	Cool & Dre; 808-Ray	3:34
19.	"Mess"	D. Carter; M. Rodriguez	Infamous	3:32
20.	"Dope New Gospel" (featuring Nivea)	D. Carter; Nivea Hamilton; Jefferson; Ginn; Richard Brownie; Marvin Sapp	R!O; Kamo^{[a]}	3:27
21.	"Perfect Strangers"	D. Carter; Thomas	Mannie Fresh	4:09
22.	"Used 2"	D. Carter; Leland Wayne; M. Rodriguez; Rhars Mejdi	Metro Boomin; Prince 85^{[a]}	4:00
23.	"Let It All Work Out"	D. Carter; Jordan Johnson; Myles William; Sampha Sisay	Jordan; Myles William; Reefa	5:16
Total length:				87:43

Tha Carter V – Bonus tracks
No.	Title	Writer(s)	Producer(s)	Length
24.	"What About Me" (featuring Post Malone)	D. Carter; Austin Post; Mitchell; Franks; Palmer; Bell; Walsh	Johnny Yukon; DJ Frank E^{[b]}	3:36
25.	"In This House" (featuring Gucci Mane)	D. Carter; Radric Davis; Matthew Barnes; Aponte; Frank Rodriguez	Onhel	3:32
26.	"Hasta La Vista"	D. Carter; Brytavious Chambers	Tay Keith	2:51
Total length:				9:59

Deluxe edition
No.	Title	Writer(s)	Producer(s)	Length
27.	"Life of Mr. Carter"	D. Carter; Desmond Gordon; Keith Lenard Miller	Bruce Almighty; PayCash	3:41
28.	"Holy"	D. Carter; Daryl Harleaux; John Fitch	MonstaBeatz	3:55
29.	"More to the Story" (featuring Raekwon)	D. Carter; Corey Woods; Diehl; M. Rodriguez; German	Ben Billions; Infamous; German	3:21
30.	"Scottie"	D. Carter; Valenzano; Lyon	Cool & Dre	4:44
31.	"F Him Good"	D. Carter; Onassis Morris	Onassis	3:29
32.	"Siri" (featuring 2 Chainz)	D. Carter; Epps; Michael Williams II; Justin Garner	Mike Will Made It; Jbo	4:52
33.	"Lost"	D. Carter; Jefferson; Ginn; Derrick Brown	R!O & Kamo; Vitamin D	4:14
Total length:				28:16

Notes

- ^{^[a]}signifies a co-producer
- ^{^[b]}signifies an additional producer
- "I Love You Dwayne" features vocals by Jacida Carter, Lil Wayne's mother
- "Can't Be Broken" features uncredited vocals by Thomas Troelsen.
- "Hittas" features uncredited vocals by Drake

Samples

- "Dedicate" contains a sample from a 2009 speech by Barack Obama, and "Dedication" written by Tauheed Epps, Joshua Luellen and Michael Dean, performed by 2 Chainz
- "Uproar" contains a sample of "Special Delivery", performed by G. Dep and P. Diddy
- "Dope Niggaz" contains a sample of "Xxplosive", written by Dr. Dre, Nate Dogg and Kurupt, performed by Hittman, Kurupt, Nate Dogg and Six-Two
- "Hittas" contains a sample of "Jealousy", performed by Boosie Badazz
- "Let It All Work Out" contains a sample of "Indecision", written and performed by Sampha

== Personnel ==
Credits adapted from Tidal.

Performance

- Lil Wayne – main artist
- XXXTentacion – featured artist (track 2)
- Swizz Beatz – featured artist (track 4)
- Travis Scott – featured artist (track 5)
- Nicki Minaj – featured artist (track 7)
- Kendrick Lamar – featured artist (track 8)
- Sosamann – featured artist (track 9)
- Reginae Carter – featured artist (track 11)
- Snoop Dogg – featured artist (track 13)
- Ashanti – featured artist (track 17)
- Mack Maine – featured artist (track 17)
- Nivea – featured artist (track 20)
- Post Malone – featured artist (track 24)
- Gucci Mane – featured artist (track 25)
- Jacida Carter – vocals (track 1)
- Thomas Troelsen – vocals (track 6)
- Anita Faye Wilson – vocals (tracks 14 and 15)
- Drake – uncredited vocals (track 14)
- Betty Wright – background vocals (track 11)

Instrumentation

- Jonah Christian – keyboards (track 7), organs (track 7)
- Keith Cooper – clarinet (track 8), flute (track 8)
- Kev Marcus – violin (track 8)
- Wilner Baptiste – viola (track 8)
- Frank E – drums (tracks 9–10, and 24)
- Johnny Yukon – bass (track 24), drums (tracks 9–10, 24), electric bass (tracks 9 and 10), keyboards (tracks 9–10, and 24), synthesizers (tracks 9–10, and 24)
- Jonathan Buice – keyboards (track 20)

Production

- Lil Wayne – executive production
- Ben Billions – production (tracks 2 and 6)
- Z3N – production (track 2)
- Louie Haze – production (track 3)
- Manny Galvez – production (track 3)
- Roc & Mayne – production (track 3)
- Avenue – production (track 4)
- Swizz Beatz – production (track 4)
- DrtWrk – production (track 5)
- Sevn Thomas – production (track 5)
- Thomas Troelsen – production (track 6)
- Jonah Christian – production (track 7)
- Bloque – production (track 7)
- Infamous – production (tracks 8, 10, and 19), additional production (tracks 14–15, and 22)
- DJ Frank E – production (tracks 9 and 10)
- Johnny Yukon – production (tracks 9–10, and 24)
- ACE – production (track 11)
- Sak Pase – production (track 11)
- Zaytoven – production (track 12)
- R!o – production (tracks 13 and 20)
- Jayones – production (track 14)
- Fatboymixx – production (track 15)
- FreeWayTJay – production (track 15)
- DJ Mustard – production (track 16)
- Mike Free – production (track 16)
- Mannie Fresh – production (tracks 17 and 21)
- 808-Ray – production (track 18)
- Cool & Dre – production (track 18)
- Metro Boomin – production (track 22)
- Jordan – production (track 23)
- Myles William – production (track 23)
- Reefa – production (track 23)
- Onhel – production (tracks 8 and 25)
- Tay Keith – production (track 26)
- Frank E – additional production (tracks 9–10, and 24)
- Nick The Piff – additional production (track 10)
- John Cunningham – vocal production (track 2)
- Kamo – co-production (tracks 13 and 20)
- Prince 85 – co-production (track 22)

Technical

- Fabian Marasciullo – mixing (tracks 2–26)
- McCoy Socalgargoyle – mixing assistance (tracks 2–26)
- Manny Galvez – recording (tracks 2–16, 18–23, 25, and 26)
- Matthew Testa – recording (tracks 4, 7, 12–13, 15, 20, 23, and 26)
- Big Juice – recording (track 7)
- Angel Aponte – recording (track 8)
- MixedByAli – recording (track 8)
- Omar Loya – recording (tracks 8, 11, 16–17, 23, 25, and 26)
- Jeff Edwards – recording (tracks 9–10, 21–22)
- Louis Bell – recording (tracks 9 and 10)
- John Kercy – recording (track 14)
- Javier Valverde – recording (track 17)
- Steve Valdez – recording (track 21)
- Jason Delattiboudere – recording assistance (tracks 2–16, 18–23, and 26)
- Sam Allison – recording assistance (track 4)
- Manny Park – recording assistance (track 7)
- Jeffrey Tanner – recording assistance (track 8)
- Carlos A. Molina – recording assistance (track 14)
- Brian Judd – recording assistance (tracks 17 and 21)
- Andy Rodriguez – recording assistance (track 23)

Notes

- "What About Me", "In This House", and "Hasta La Vista" are credited as tracks 24, 25, 26, respectively.

== Charts ==
=== Weekly charts ===
Chart (2018)	Peak position
Australian Albums (ARIA)	6
Austrian Albums (Ö3 Austria)	15
Belgian Albums (Ultratop Flanders)	8
Belgian Albums (Ultratop Wallonia)	26
Canadian Albums (Billboard)	1
Czech Albums (ČNS IFPI)	21
Danish Albums (Hitlisten)	6
Dutch Albums (Album Top 100)	3
Finnish Albums (Suomen virallinen lista)	13
French Albums (SNEP)	49
German Albums (Offizielle Top 100)	33
Irish Albums (IRMA)	5
Italian Albums (FIMI)	14
New Zealand Albums (RMNZ)	3
Norwegian Albums (VG-lista)	2
Scottish Albums (Official Charts)	49
Slovak Albums (ČNS IFPI)	5
Swedish Albums (Sverigetopplistan)	5
Swiss Albums (Schweizer Hitparade)	12
UK Albums (Official Charts)	5
US Billboard 200	1
US Top R&B/Hip-Hop Albums (Billboard)	1

=== Year-end charts ===
Chart (2018)	Position
Canadian Albums (Billboard)	45
US Billboard 200	24
US Top R&B/Hip-Hop Albums (Billboard)	16

Chart (2019)	Position
US Billboard 200	40
US Top R&B/Hip-Hop Albums (Billboard)	22

=== Decade-end charts ===
Chart (2010–2019)	Position
US Billboard 200	173

== Certifications ==
Region	Certification	Certified units/sales
United Kingdom (BPI)	Silver	60,000^{‡}
United States (RIAA)	2× Platinum	2,000,000^{‡}
^{‡} Sales+streaming figures based on certification alone.
