= Jessie J discography =

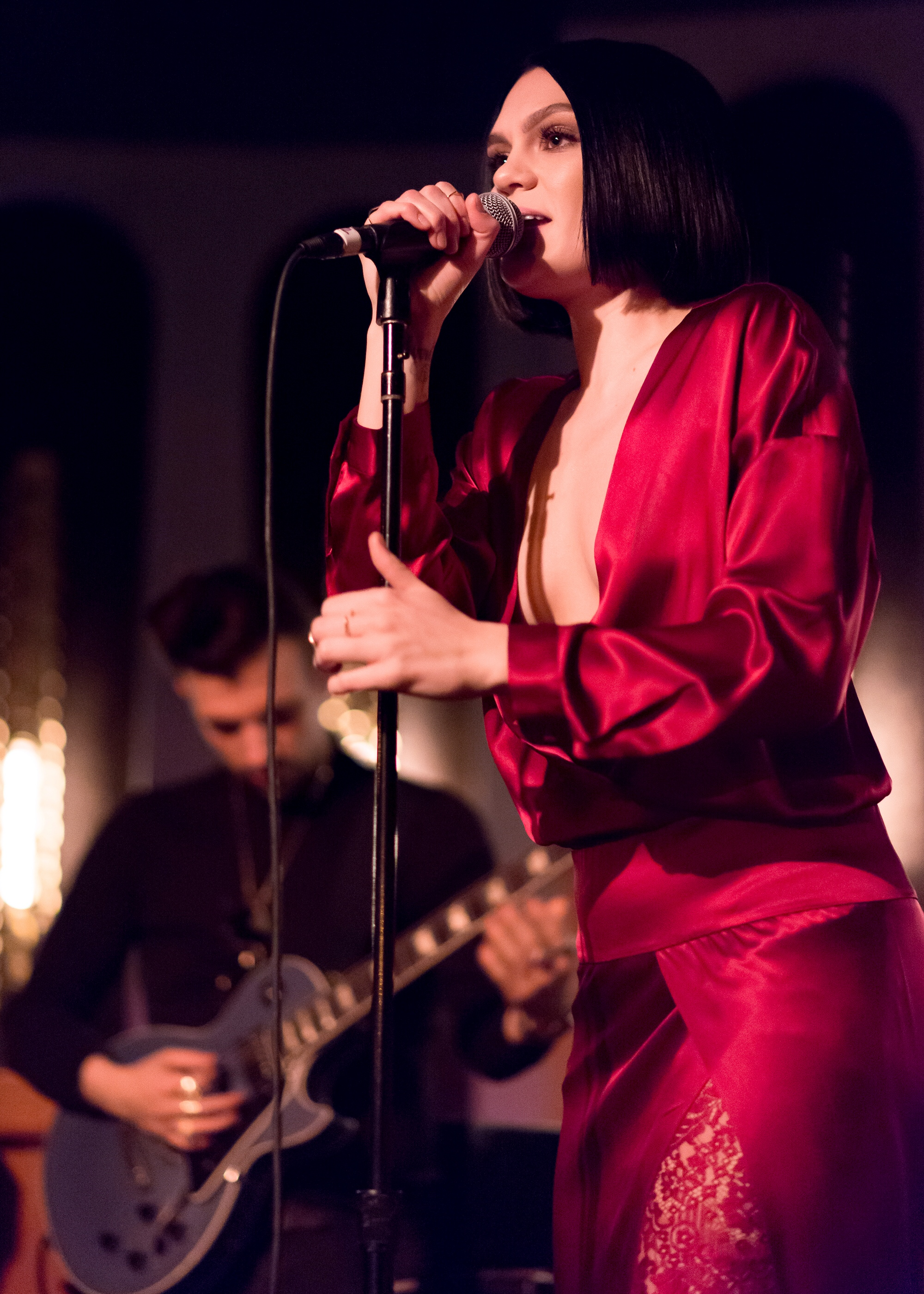
- Jessie J performing in Los Angeles, in December 2017
- Studio albums: 5
- Singles: 32
- Music videos: 30
- Promotional singles: 6

English singer Jessie J has released five studio albums, one extended play (which was also her first live album), thirty two singles (including four as a featured artist), twenty-nine music videos, and six promotional singles. According to Recording Industry Association of America, J has sold 15 million digital singles and 1 million albums in the United States.

Jessie J released her debut single, "Do It like a Dude", in the United Kingdom in November 2010, where it peaked at number two on the UK Singles Chart. It also reached number eight in New Zealand. Her follow-up single, "Price Tag", which featured B.o.B, was released in late January 2011, spending two weeks at number-one in the UK; selling over a million copies as of January 2012. The single also reached number 23 on the Billboard Hot 100 in the United States and peaked at number-one in France, Ireland, New Zealand, while reaching the top three in Australia, Germany and the Netherlands. Her debut album, Who You Are, was released in February 2011 and reached number two on the UK Albums Chart. It also reached the top 10 in Australia, Canada, Ireland and New Zealand, and number 11 in the US. The album's third single, "Nobody's Perfect", peaked at number nine in the UK, while its fourth single, "Who's Laughing Now", peaked at 16. The fifth single from the album, "Who You Are", earned Jessie a fourth top-ten hit in December 2011, when it peaked at number eight. A non-album single, "Domino", was released in some territories, peaking at number three in New Zealand, number five in Australia and became her first top ten single on the US Billboard Hot 100; peaking at number six. The track was later included on the repackaged edition of Who You Are in the UK and was released as the sixth single and became her second number-one single in the UK in January 2012. A seventh single, "Laserlight" taken from the platinum edition of the album it was released in May 2012; reaching the top 10 in the UK and Ireland. As a result of this, Cornish became the first British female to have six top-ten singles from the same album.

The campaign for the second studio album Alive was launched in May 2013, with the worldwide release of "Wild". Featuring rappers Big Sean and Dizzee Rascal, the track reached number five in the United Kingdom and number six in Australia. A second single—"It's My Party"—preceded the release of the album on 15 September. "Alive" was released on 20 September 2013. The third and final single, Thunder, was released on 8 December 2013, and reached 18 in the UK and Ireland.

Jessie J also appeared as a guest vocalist on James Morrison's single "Up" in November 2011. The single, released from the album The Awakening, reached number 30 in the United Kingdom. In December 2012, Jessie J featured on singer Daley's single "Remember Me"; a track which went on to reach number 24 in the UK. She also featured in "Calling All Hearts" with Robin Thicke and DJ Cassidy in spring 2014.

Jessie J started the promotion of her third album with "Bang Bang", a collaboration with Ariana Grande and Nicki Minaj. The song debuted at number one in the UK and reached number three in the US. The next single, "Burnin Up" was a minor hit, peaking at number 86 on the US Billboard Hot 100 and number 100 on the Canadian Hot 100. The single peaked at number 73 in the UK. On 13 October 2014, Sweet Talker was released worldwide.

In 2018 Jessie J released her fourth album R.O.S.E. in four parts, available as four separate EPs, titled Realisations, Obsessions, Sex, and Empowerment. The titles create an acronym for Rose, her mother's name and her favorite flower. The four EPs were released on 22, 23, 24, and 25 May.

== Studio albums ==
List of studio albums, with selected chart positions and certifications
Title	Album details	Peak chart positions										Certifications
Title	Album details	UK	AUS	CAN	DEN	GER	IRE	NLD	NZ	SWI	US	Certifications
Who You Are	Released: 25 February 2011; Label: Island, Lava; Formats: CD, CD/DVD, digital download	2	4	6	5	18	4	41	4	29	11	BPI: 4× Platinum; ARIA: Platinum; BVMI: Gold; IFPI DEN: Platinum; IRMA: 2× Platinum; RIAA: Platinum; RMNZ: 4× Platinum
Alive	Released: 23 September 2013; Label: Island, Lava; Formats: CD, digital download	3	7	—	—	35	6	19	18	15	—	BPI: Gold
Sweet Talker	Released: 13 October 2014; Label: Republic, Lava; Formats: CD, digital download	5	14	16	26	25	11	19	13	12	10	BPI: Gold
This Christmas Day	Released: 26 October 2018; Label: Republic, Lava; Format: CD, digital download	— (Note: This Christmas Day did not enter the UK Albums Chart, but peaked at number 92 on the UK Albums Sales Chart and number 99 on the UK Physical Albums Chart.)	—	—	—	—	—	—	—	—	—	
Don't Tease Me with a Good Time	Released: 28 November 2025; Label: Jessie J, D.A.P.; Format: CD, digital download, LP	19	—	—	—	—	—	—	—	—	—	
"—" denotes items which were not released in that country or failed to chart.

== Extended plays ==
List of extended plays
Title	EP details
iTunes Festival	Released: 14 October 2012; Label: Universal Republic; Format: Digital download
R.O.S.E. (Realisations)	Released: 22 May 2018; Label: Republic; Format: Digital download
R.O.S.E. (Obsessions)	Released: 23 May 2018; Label: Republic; Format: Digital download
R.O.S.E. (Sex)	Released: 24 May 2018; Label: Republic; Format: Digital download
R.O.S.E. (Empowerment)	Released: 25 May 2018; Label: Republic; Format: Digital download

== Singles ==
=== As lead artist ===
List of singles as lead artist, with selected chart positions and certifications, showing year released and album name
Single	Year	Peak chart positions										Certifications	Album
Single	Year	UK	AUS	AUT	CAN	DEN	GER	IRE	NLD	NZ	US	Certifications	Album
"Do It like a Dude"	2010	2	66	62	—	16	41	11	95	8	—	BPI: Platinum; ARIA: Platinum; IFPI DEN: Gold; RMNZ: Platinum	Who You Are
"Price Tag" (featuring B.o.B)	2011	1	2	11	4	14	3	1	3	1	23	BPI: 3× Platinum; ARIA: 8× Platinum; BVMI: 3× Gold; IFPI DEN: Platinum; RIAA: 4× Platinum; RMNZ: 4× Platinum	Who You Are
"Nobody's Perfect"	2011	9	9	33	—	27	40	14	19	10	—	BPI: Gold; ARIA: 2× Platinum; RMNZ: Gold	Who You Are
"Who's Laughing Now"	2011	16	—	—	—	—	—	28	—	—	—	BPI: Silver	Who You Are
"Domino"	2011	1	5	26	7	22	22	1	20	3	6	BPI: 3× Platinum; ARIA: 5× Platinum; BVMI: Gold; IFPI DEN: Platinum; RIAA: Platinum; RMNZ: 4× Platinum	Who You Are
"Who You Are"	2011	8	86	—	85	—	—	23	—	—	— (Note: "Who You Are" did not enter the Billboard Hot 100, but peaked at number 12 on the Bubbling Under Hot 100 Singles chart.)	BPI: Platinum; RMNZ: Platinum	Who You Are
"Laserlight" (featuring David Guetta)	2012	5	48	—	—	—	—	9	—	19	—	BPI: Gold; ARIA: Gold	Who You Are
"Silver Lining (Crazy 'Bout You)"	2012	100	—	—	—	—	66	—	—	—	—		Silver Linings Playbook
"Wild" (featuring Big Sean and Dizzee Rascal)	2013	5	6	34	—	16	12	9	63	24	— (Note: "Wild" did not enter the Billboard Hot 100, but peaked at number 4 on the Bubbling Under Hot 100 Singles chart.)	BPI: Gold; ARIA: 2× Platinum; IFPI DEN: Gold; RMNZ: Gold	Alive
"It's My Party"	2013	3	12	—	—	—	—	12	—	—	—	BPI: Silver; ARIA: Platinum	Alive
"Thunder"	2013	18	100	—	—	—	—	55	—	—	—		Alive
"Bang Bang" (Note: "Bang Bang" also appears on Ariana Grande's second studio album My Everything.) (with Ariana Grande and Nicki Minaj)	2014	1	4	12	3	10	13	3	7	4	3	BPI: 4× Platinum; ARIA: 5× Platinum; BVMI: Platinum; IFPI DEN: 2× Platinum; MC: 6× Platinum; RIAA: Diamond; RMNZ: 5× Platinum	Sweet Talker
"Burnin' Up" (featuring 2 Chainz)	2014	73	63	—	100	—	—	—	—	—	86		Sweet Talker
"Masterpiece"	2015	159	14	9	74	—	10	—	—	13	65	ARIA: 2× Platinum; BVMI: Gold; RMNZ: Platinum	Sweet Talker
"You've Lost That Lovin' Feelin'" (with Tom Jones)	2015	—	—	—	—	—	—	—	—	—	—		Non-album-single
"Flashlight"	2015	13	2	37	57	—	38	31	55	7	61	BPI: Platinum; ARIA: 4× Platinum; BVMI: Gold; IFPI DEN: Platinum; RMNZ: 2× Platinum	Pitch Perfect 2
"Ain't Been Done"	2015	—	47	—	—	—	—	—	—	—	—		Sweet Talker
"Man With The Bag"	2015	70	—	—	—	—	—	—	74	—	—	BPI: Silver	This Christmas Day
"Real Deal"	2017	—	—	—	—	—	—	—	—	—	—		R.O.S.E.
"Think About That"	2017	—	—	—	—	—	—	—	—	—	—		R.O.S.E.
"Not My Ex"	2017	—	—	—	—	—	—	—	—	—	—		R.O.S.E.
"Queen"	2017	— (Note: "Queen" did not enter the UK Singles Chart, but peaked at number 82 on the Official Singles Downloads Chart and number 83 on the Official Singles Sales Chart.)	—	—	—	—	—	—	—	—	—		R.O.S.E.
"Love Will Save the World"	2018	—	—	—	—	—	—	—	—	—	—		Non-album-singles
"Brave" (with Don Diablo)	2019	—	—	—	—	—	—	—	—	—	—		Non-album-singles
"One More Try"	2019	—	—	—	—	—	—	—	—	—	—		& Juliet
"Weaponry" (with Mike Posner)	2020	—	—	—	—	—	—	—	—	— (Note: "Weaponry" did not enter the NZ Top 40 Singles Chart, but peaked at number 39 on the NZ Hot Singles Chart.)	—		Operation: Wake Up
"I Want Love"	2021	— (Note: "I Want Love" did not enter the Official Singles Chart, but peaked at number 26 on the Official Singles Downloads Chart.)	—	—	—	—	—	—	—	—	—		Non-album single
"No Secrets"	2025	— (Note: "No Secrets" did not enter the UK Singles Chart, but peaked at number 62 on the Official Singles Downloads Chart and number 66 on the Official Singles Sales Chart.)	—	—	—	—	—	—	—	—	—		Don't Tease Me With a Good Time
"Living My Best Life"	2025	— (Note: "Living My Best Life" did not enter the UK Singles Chart Top 100, but debuted at number 20 on both the UK Singles Downloads and UK Singles Sales charts, on 23 May 2025.)	—	—	—	—	—	—	—	—	—		Don't Tease Me With a Good Time
"Believe in Magic"	2025	— (Note: "Believe in Magic" did not enter the UK Singles Chart Top 100, but debuted and peaked at number 63 on the UK Singles Downloads Charts.)	—	—	—	—	—	—	—	—	—		Don't Tease Me With a Good Time
"H.A.P.P.Y"	2025	— (Note: "H.A.P.P.Y" did not enter the UK Singles Chart Top 100, but peaked at number 86 on the UK Singles Downloads Chart.)	—	—	—	—	—	—	—	—	—		Don't Tease Me With a Good Time
"I'll Never Know Why"	2025	— (Note: "I'll Never Know Why" did not enter the UK Singles Chart Top 100, but debuted at number 5 on the UK Singles Downloads Chart.)	—	—	—	—	—	—	—	— (Note: "I'll Never Know Why" did not enter the NZ Top 40 Singles Chart, but peaked at number 36 on the NZ Hot Singles Chart.)	—		Don't Tease Me With a Good Time
"My Way" (Live at Jools' Annual Hootenanny) (with Jools Holland)	2026	—	—	—	—	—	—	—	—	—	—		Non-album single
"—" denotes items which were not released in that country or failed to chart.

=== As featured artist ===
List of singles as featured artist, with selected chart positions, showing year released and album name
Single	Year	Peak chart positions							Album
Single	Year	UK	AUS	AUT	GER	IRE	NLD	SWI	Album
"Up" (James Morrison featuring Jessie J)	2011	30	—	24	19	—	70	37	The Awakening
"Remember Me" (Daley featuring Jessie J)	2012	24	—	—	—	—	—	—	Alone Together
"Calling All Hearts" (DJ Cassidy featuring Robin Thicke and Jessie J)	2014	6	—	—	—	—	—	—	Paradise Royale
"Where's the Love?" (The Black Eyed Peas featuring various artists)	2016	47	—	—	—	—	—	—	Non album-singles
"Bridge over Troubled Water" (as part of Artists for Grenfell)	2017	1	53	32	—	25	—	28	Non album-singles
"Heaven Bound" (Louis York featuring Jessie J)	2023	—	—	—	—	—	—	—	Non album-singles
"—" denotes single that did not chart or was not released.

=== Promotional singles ===
List of promotional singles, with selected chart positions, showing year released and album name
Title	Year	Peak chart positions		Album
Title	Year	KOR Int.	US Adult R&B	Album
"Casualty of Love"	2011	—	28	Who You Are
"Square One"	2013	—	—	Alive
"Personal"	2014	49	—	Sweet Talker
"Sweet Talker"	2014	—	—	Sweet Talker
"Can't Take My Eyes Off You"	2016	—	—	Non album-singles
"Together Till Infinity" (from Infinity Nikki)	2024	—	—	Non album-singles
"—" denotes items which were not released in that country or failed to chart.

== Other charted and certified songs ==
List of songs, with selected chart positions and certifications, showing year released and album name
Title	Year	Peak chart positions				Certifications	Album
Title	Year	UK	AUS	CAN AC	IRE	Certifications	Album
"Mamma Knows Best"	2011	59	—	—	—		Who You Are
"Abracadabra"	2011	106	—	—	—		Who You Are
"Rainbow"	2011	158	—	—	—		Who You Are
"Stand Up"	2011	186	—	—	—		Who You Are
"My Shadow"	2011	188	—	—	—		Who You Are
"Repeat" (David Guetta featuring Jessie J)	2011	108	—	—	—		Nothing but the Beat
"We Will Rock You" (Queen featuring Jessie J)	2012	107	—	—	—		A Symphony of British Music
"Sexy Lady"	2013	22	—	—	30	BPI: Silver	Alive
"Excuse My Rude" (featuring Becky G)	2013	124	—	—	—		Alive
"I Miss Her"	2013	194	—	—	—		Alive
"Do You Hear What I Hear?" (Mary J. Blige featuring Jessie J)	2013	59	—	—	40		A Mary Christmas
"We Don't Play Around" (Dizzee Rascal featuring Jessie J)	2014	—	46	—	—		The Fifth
"Rockin' Around the Christmas Tree"	2018	—	—	19	—		This Christmas Day
"This Christmas Day"	2018	—	—	41	—		This Christmas Day
"Silent Night"	2018	—	—	33	—		This Christmas Day
"Santa Claus Is Comin' to Town"	2018	—	—	37	—		This Christmas Day
"White Christmas"	2018	—	—	37	—		This Christmas Day
"—" denotes items which were not released in that country or failed to chart.

== Guest appearances ==
List of guest appearances, showing year released and album name
Title	Year	Album
"Sexy Silk"	2010	Easy A
"Love Shine Down" (Olly Murs featuring Jessie J)	2010	Olly Murs
"Repeat" (David Guetta featuring Jessie J)	2011	Nothing but the Beat
"I Wanna Dance with Somebody" (Live)	2011	Dermot O'Leary Presents the Saturday Sessions 2011
"We Will Rock You" (Queen featuring Jessie J)	2012	A Symphony of British Music
"Do You Hear What I Hear?" (Mary J. Blige featuring Jessie J)	2013	A Mary Christmas
"We Don't Play Around" (Dizzee Rascal featuring Jessie J)	2014	The Fifth
"Part of Your World" (From The Little Mermaid)	2015	We Love Disney
"Grease (Is the Word)"	2016	Grease: Live
"My Superstar"	2016	Ice Age: Collision Course
"I Got You (I Feel Good)"	2018	Fifty Shades Freed
"Flashlight"	2020	One World: Together at Home
"Bang Bang"	2020	One World: Together at Home

== Music videos ==
=== As lead artist ===
List of music videos as lead artist, showing year released and director(s)
Title	Year	Director(s)
"Do It like a Dude"	2010	Emil Nava
"Price Tag" (featuring B.o.B)	2011	Emil Nava
"Nobody's Perfect"	2011	Emil Nava
"Who's Laughing Now"	2011	Emil Nava
"Who You Are"	2011	Emil Nava
"Domino"	2011	Ray Kay
"Laserlight" (featuring David Guetta)	2012	Emil Nava
"Silver Living (Crazy 'Bout You)"	2012	Andrew Logan
"Wild" (featuring Big Sean and Dizzee Rascal)	2013	Emil Nava
"It's My Party"	2013	Emil Nava
"Thunder"	2013	Emil Nava
"Bang Bang" (with Ariana Grande and Nicki Minaj)	2014	Hannah Lux Davis
"Burnin' Up" (featuring 2 Chainz)	2014	Hannah Lux Davis
"Masterpiece"	2014	Tabitha Denholm
"Flashlight"	2015	Hannah Lux Davis
"Can't Take My Eyes Off You"	2016	Rankin
"Real Deal" (lyric video)	2017	Jake Stark
"Think About That"	2017	Erik Rojas, Brian Ziff & Jessie J
"Not My Ex"	2017	Brian Ziff
"Queen" (acoustic)	2018	Allie Snow
"Queen"	2018	Marc Klasfeld
"I Want Love"	2021	Summen Deven and Danky Cogon
"No Secrets" (lyric video)	2025	—N/a
"Living My Best Life" (visualiser)	2025	Jessie J & Christoph
"Believe In Magic"	2025	—N/a
"H.A.P.P.Y"	2025	Mitch Peryer
"I’ll Never Know Why"	2025	Jessie J
"Feel It On Me" (lyric video)	2026	—N/a
"I Don’t Care"	2026	—N/a
"Comes In Waves"	2026	—N/a
"California"	2026	Jessie J

=== As featured artist ===
List of music videos as featured artist, showing year released and director(s)
Title	Year	Director(s)
"Up" (James Morrison featuring Jessie J)	2011	Phil Griffin
"Remember Me" (Daley featuring Jessie J)	2012	Ethan Lader
"Calling All Hearts" (DJ Cassidy featuring Robin Thicke and Jessie J)	2014	Director X
"Brave" (Don Diablo with Jessie J)	2019	Patrick van der Wal
"Heaven Bound" (Louis York with Jessie J)	2023	—N/a

=== Guest appearances ===
List of music videos as guest, showing year released and director(s)
Title	Year	Director(s)
"Where's the Love?" (Black Eyed Peas featuring The World)	2016	Michael Jurkovac
"Malibu" (At Home Edition) (Kim Petras)	2020	Kim Petras

== Songwriting credits ==
Song	Year	Artist	Album
"Party in the U.S.A."	2009	Miley Cyrus	The Time of Our Lives
"Move"	2009	Lisa Lois	Smoke (Bonus Track Version)
"Owe It To You"	2009	Lisa Lois	Smoke (Bonus Track Version)
"I Need This"	2009	Chris Brown	Graffiti (Expanded Edition)
"V.I.P."	2011	Kumi Koda	4 Times
"Clued Up"	2015	Little Mix	Get Weird (Deluxe Edition)
"Free"	2016	LaGaylia Frazier	Lp
"GOT ME GOING'"	2018	Kumi Koda	And
