= List of Jessie J concert tours =

The following is a chronological list of English recording artist, Jessie J's concert tours.

== Stand Up Tour ==
Stand Up Tour
- Tour by Jessie J
- Promotional poster for the tour
- Associated album: Who You Are
- Start date: 31 March 2011
- End date: 9 April 2011
- Legs: 1
- No. of shows: 5 in Europe

Jessie J concert chronology
- Stand Up Tour (2011); Heartbeat Tour (2011–12)

The Stand Up Tour is a UK tour by English recording artist Jessie J in support of her debut studio album, Who You Are.

=== Opening acts ===
- Encore

=== Setlist ===
1. "Mamma Knows Best"
2. "Abracadabra"
3. "Stand Up"
4. "Do It Like A Dude"
5. "L.O.V.E"
6. "Big White Room"
7. "Who's Laughing Now"
8. "Rainbow"
9. "Nobody's Perfect"

Encore

10. "Who You Are"
11. "Price Tag"

=== The Band ===
- Guitar: Rene Woollard
- Drums: Nathaniel 'Tonez' Fuller
- Keyboards: Hannah V
- Bass: Phil Simmonds

=== Tour dates ===
| Date | City | Country | Venue |
|---|---|---|---|
Europe
| 31 March 2011 | Glasgow | Scotland | O_{2} Academy |
| 1 April 2011 | Bristol | England | O_{2} Academy |
| 2 April 2011 | Birmingham | England | O_{2} Academy |
| 4 April 2011 | Manchester | England | Manchester Academy |
| 5 April 2011 | London | England | O_{2} Shepherd's Bush Empire |
| 7 April 2011 | Dublin | Ireland | The Academy |

== Sweet Talker Tour ==
Sweet Talker Tour
- Concert by Jessie J
- Promotional poster for the 2015 tour
- Associated album: Sweet Talker
- Start date: 20 January 2015
- End date: 12 December 2015
- Legs: 6
- No. of shows: 37 in Europe; 19 in North America; 4 in Asia; 3 in Australasia; 63 total

=== Background ===
In November 2014, Jessie J announced a 7-day UK Tour. The tour began in January, 2015. Around the end of 2014 Jessie J announced her first North American Tour. Throughout the course of the year she carried on promoting the 3rd Album in places, including Australia, Asia, North America and Europe with a total of 96 shows.

=== Setlist ===
This is the setlist was obtained from the concert held on 20 January 2015, at the Rhyl Pavillon in Rhyl, Wales. It does not represent every concert for the duration of the tour.

1. "Ain't Been Done"
2. "Burnin Up"
3. "Wild"
4. "Who's Laughing Now"
5. "Loud"
6. "LaserLight"
7. "Nobody's Perfect"
8. "Sweet Talker"
9. "Seal Me With a Kiss"
10. "Abracadabra"
11. "Keep Us Together"
12. "Get Away"
13. "I Have Nothing"
14. "You Don't Really Know Me"
15. "Big White Room"
16. "Who You Are"
17. "Sexy Lady"
18. "Domino"
19. "Price Tag"
20. "Do It Like a Dude"
21. "Masterpiece"
22. "Bang Bang"

=== Tour dates ===
| Date | City | Country | Venue |
Europe
| 20 January 2015 | Rhyl | Wales | Rhyl Pavillon |
| 22 January 2015 | Newcastle | England | O_{2} Academy |
| 24 January 2015 | Manchester | England | O_{2} Apollo |
| 25 January 2015 | Leeds | England | O_{2} Academy |
| 27 January 2015 | Birmingham | England | O_{2} Academy |
| 28 January 2015 | London | England | O_{2} Academy Brixton |
| 29 January 2015 | London | England | Eventim Apollo |
| 1 February 2015 (Note: This date was postponed from 1 January to 21 February.) | Glasgow | Scotland | O_{2} Academy |
| 5 February 2015 | Paris | France | Le Trianon |
North America
| 8 February 2015 | Los Angeles | United States | Kentia Exhibit Hall |
| 12 February 2015 | Atlanta | United States | Center Stage Theater |
| 14 February 2015 | Orlando | United States | Universal Music Plaza Stage |
| 15 February 2015 | Miami | United States | The Fillmore Miami Beach |
Asia
| 7 March 2015 | Singapore | | Sands Theatre |
| 8 March 2015 (Note: The 8 March 2015 concert in Jakarta at Jakarta I is part of Java Jazz Festival.) | Jakarta | Indonesia | Jakarta International Expo |
Australasia
| 11 March 2015 | Auckland | New Zealand | Vector Arena |
| 13 March 2015 | Brisbane | Australia | Eatons Hill Ballroom |
| 14 March 2015 | Sydney | Australia | Big Top |
North America
| 24 April 2015 | Cambridge | United States | Harvard Yard |
| 25 April 2015 | New Haven | United States | Old Campus |
| 26 April 2015 | Waltham | United States | Great Lawn |
| 28 April 2015 | Boston | United States | Royale |
| 29 April 2015 | New York City | United States | Webster Hall |
| 1 May 2015 | College Park | United States | Xfinity Center |
| 4 May 2015 | Worcester | United States | Hart Recreation Center |
| 6 May 2015 | Montreal | Canada | Métropolis |
| 7 May 2015 | Toronto | Canada | Danforth Music Hall |
| 9 May 2015 | Chicago | United States | House of Blues |
| 11 May 2015 | Minneapolis | United States | First Avenue |
| 13 May 2015 | Denver | United States | Ogden Theatre |
| 15 May 2015 | Las Vegas | United States | MGM Resorts Festival Grounds |
| 18 May 2015 | Los Angeles | United States | Club Nokia |
| 19 May 2015 | San Francisco | United States | The Fillmore |
Europe
| 28 May 2015 | Stockholm | Sweden | Stora Scen |
| 29 May 2015 | Oslo | Norway | Bislett Stadium |
| 30 May 2015 | Hanover | Germany | Messegelände |
| 1 June 2015 | Cologne | Germany | Palladium |
| 2 June 2015 | Offenbach am Main | Germany | Capitol |
| 3 June 2015 | Munich | Germany | Kesselhaus |
| 5 June 2015 | Zurich | Switzerland | X-TRA |
| 8 June 2015 | Amsterdam | Netherlands | Paradiso |
| 9 June 2015 | Amsterdam | Netherlands | Paradiso |
| 10 June 2015 | Paris | France | Bataclan |
| 14 June 2015 | Lisbon | Portugal | MEO Arena |
| 18 June 2015 | Barcelona | Spain | Auditori Aire Lliure |
| 19 June 2015 | Copenhagen | Denmark | Plænen |
| 25 June 2015 | Werchter | Belgium | Werchter Festivalpark |
| 25 June 2015 | Thisted | Denmark | Dyrskuepladsen |
| 5 July 2015 | London | England | Finsbury Park |
| 8 July 2015 | Henley-on-Thames | England | Henley Festival Grounds |
| 10 July 2015 | Scarborough | England | Scarborough Open Air Theatre |
| 11 July 2015 | Auchterarder | Scotland | Strathallan Castle |
Asia
| 15 July 2015 | Jounieh | Lebanon | Fouad Shehab Stadium |
Europe
| 17 July 2015 | Pori | Finland | Kirjurinluoto Arena |
| 18 July 2015 | Northampton | England | Delapré Park |
| 19 July 2015 | London | England | Somerset House |
| 11 September 2015 | Istanbul | Turkey | Volkswagen Arena |
| 13 September 2015 | Hickstead | England | All England Jumping Course at Hickstead |
| 14 September 2015 | Frankfurt | Germany | Gibson Club |
| 15 September 2015 | Reykjavík | Iceland | Laugardalshöll |
| 26 September 2015 | Paris | France | Casino de Paris |
Asia
| 10 December 2015 | Quezon City | Philippines | Kia Theatre |
| 12 December 2015 | Phnom Penh | Cambodia | Koh Pich |

== Live 2017 ==
Live 2017
- Concert by Jessie J
- Promotional poster for the 2017 tour
- Start date: 8 October 2017
- End date: 1 November 2017
- Legs: 1
- No. of shows: 7 in Europe; 5 in North America; 12 total

Live 2017 is the fifth concert tour by English singer-songwriter Jessie J. The tour was to promote the singles from her fourth studio album, R.O.S.E, which was released later. The tour began on 8 October 2017 in Birmingham, England, and concluded on 1 November 2017, in New York, USA. The tour spanned 12 shows visiting Britain, Europe and North America.

=== Opening act ===
- Albert Stanaj
- Wayne Jackson

=== Setlist ===
1. Who You Are
2. Domino
3. Real Deal
4. Nobody's Perfect
5. Not My Ex
6. Flashlight
7. Earth Song
8. Think About That
9. Masterpiece
10. Mamma Knows Best
11. Bang Bang
12. Price Tag
13. Do It Like A Dude

=== Tour dates ===
| Date | City | Country | Venue |
Europe
| 8 October 2017 | Birmingham | England | O_{2} Institute |
| 9 October 2017 | Manchester | England | Albert Hall |
| 11 October 2017 | London | England | KOKO |
| 12 October 2017 | London | England | O_{2} Shepherd's Bush Empire |
| 14 October 2017 | Cologne | Germany | Live Music Hall |
| 16 October 2017 | Amsterdam | Netherlands | Paradiso |
| 17 October 2017 | Berlin | Germany | Huxleys Neue Welt |
North America
| 23 October 2017 | Toronto | Canada | Mod Club Theatre |
| 25 October 2017 | Chicago | United States | Bottom Lounge |
| 27 October 2017 | West Hollywood | United States | Troubadour |
| 28 October 2017 | San Francisco | United States | Great American Music Hall |
| 1 November 2017 | New York City | United States | (Le) Poisson Rouge |

== R.O.S.E Tour ==
R.O.S.E. Tour
- Concert by Jessie J
- Promotional poster for the 2018 tour
- Associated album: R.O.S.E
- Start date: 30 August 2018
- End date: 5 December 2018
- Legs: 3
- No. of shows: 12 in Asia; 18 in North America; 18 in Europe; 48 total

The R.O.S.E Tour is the sixth concert tour by English singer-songwriter Jessie J, in support of her fourth studio album, R.O.S.E. (2018).

=== Opening act ===
- Ro James (North America)
- J.Sheon (Shenzhen)
- Sincerely Wilson (United Kingdom)

=== Setlist ===
The following setlist was obtained from the concert held on 30 August 2018, at the Optics Valley International Tennis Centre in Wuhan, China. It does not represent all concerts for the duration of the tour.

1. "Think About That"
2. "Do It like a Dude"
3. "Burnin' Up"
4. "Petty"
5. "Nobody's Perfect"
6. "Not My Ex"
7. "Easy on Me"
8. "Thunder"
9. "Stand Up"
10. "Flashlight"
11. "Queen"
12. "Who You Are"
13. "Play"
14. "Domino"
15. "Masterpiece"
16. "Mamma Knows Best"
17. "Bang Bang"
18. "Price Tag"

=== Tour dates ===
| Date | City | Country | Venue |
Asia
| 30 August 2018 | Wuhan | China | Optics Valley International Tennis Centre |
| 1 September 2018 | Zhengzhou | China | ZICEC Grand Hall |
| 5 September 2018 | Chengdu | China | Wuliangye Chengdu Performing Arts Centre |
| 6 September 2018 | Beijing | China | Cadillac Arena |
| 7 September 2018 | Changsha | China | HICEC Multifunctional Hall |
| 9 September 2018 | Wuxi | China | Wuxi Sports Center Indoor Stadium |
| 12 September 2018 | Shenzhen | China | Shenzhen Bay Sports Centre Arena |
| 14 September 2018 | Hangzhou | China | Yellow Dragon Gymnasium |
| 16 September 2018 | Tianjin | China | Tianjin Gymnasium |
| 18 September 2018 | Shanghai | China | Mercedes-Benz Arena |
| 20 September 2018 | Taipei | Taiwan | Nangang C3 Field |
| 22 September 2018 | Hong Kong | China | VIVA |
North America
| 1 October 2018 | San Francisco | United States | Warfield Theatre |
| 3 October 2018 | Vancouver | Canada | Vogue Theatre |
| 4 October 2018 | Portland | United States | Crystal Ballroom |
| 6 October 2018 | Seattle | United States | Showbox SoDo |
| 8 October 2018 | Salt Lake City | United States | The Depot |
| 9 October 2018 | Englewood | United States | Gothic Theatre |
| 11 October 2018 | Minneapolis | United States | State Theatre |
| 12 October 2018 | Chicago | United States | Riviera Theatre |
| 14 October 2018 | Royal Oak | United States | Royal Oak Music Theatre |
| 16 October 2018 | Toronto | Canada | Rebel |
| 17 October 2018 | Montreal | Canada | MTelus |
| 19 October 2018 | New York City | United States | Hammerstein Ballroom |
| 20 October 2018 | Philadelphia | United States | Electric Factory |
| 22 October 2018 | Boston | United States | House of Blues |
| 23 October 2018 | Silver Spring | United States | The Fillmore Silver Spring |
| 25 October 2018 | Atlanta | United States | Buckhead Theatre |
| 28 October 2018 | Houston | United States | Warehouse Live |
| 1 November 2018 | Los Angeles | United States | Wiltern Theatre |
Europe
| 8 November 2018 | Leicester | England | De Montfort Hall |
| 9 November 2018 | Bournemouth | England | O_{2} Academy |
| 11 November 2018 | Sheffield | England | O_{2} Academy |
| 13 November 2018 | London | England | Royal Albert Hall |
| 14 November 2018 | Bristol | England | O_{2} Academy |
| 16 November 2018 | Manchester | England | Manchester Academy |
| 17 November 2018 | Oxford | England | New Theatre |
| 19 November 2018 | Cambridge | England | Cambridge Corn Exchange |
| 20 November 2018 | Birmingham | England | O_{2} Academy |
| 22 November 2018 | Norwich | England | Lower Common Room |
| 23 November 2018 | Southend-on-Sea | England | Cliffs Pavilion |
| 25 November 2018 | Liverpool | England | Empire Theatre |
| 26 November 2018 | Leeds | England | O_{2} Academy |
| 28 November 2018 | Glasgow | Scotland | O_{2} Academy |
| 29 November 2018 | Newcastle | England | O_{2} Academy |
| 1 December 2018 | Dublin | Ireland | National Stadium |
| 3 December 2018 | Amsterdam | Netherlands | AFAS Live |
| 5 December 2018 | Cologne | Germany | Palladium |

Cancellations and rescheduled shows

| 3 September 2018 | Beijing, China | Cadillac Arena | Rescheduled to 6 September 2018 |
| 29 October 2018 | Dallas, Texas | House of Blues | Cancelled |
| 30 October 2018 | Phoenix, Arizona | The Van Buren | Cancelled |

== Lasty Tour ==
Lasty Tour
- Concert by Jessie J
- Start date: 13 April 2019
- End date: 1 October 2019
- Legs: 4
- No. of shows: 2 in Asia; 3 in South America; 17 in Europe; 22 total

Lasty Tour is the seventh concert tour by English singer-songwriter Jessie J.

=== Setlist ===
The following setlist was obtained from the concert held on 17 April 2019, at the Columbiahalle in Berlin, Germany. It does not represent all concerts for the duration of the tour.

1. "Who's Laughing Now"
2. "Masterpiece"
3. "Do It like a Dude"
4. "Real Deal"
5. "Not My Ex"
6. "Nobody's Perfect"
7. "It's My Party"
8. "Sexy Lady"
9. "Wild"
10. "Easy on Me"
11. "Big White Room"
12. "Stand Up"
13. "Queen"
14. "Flashlight"
15. "Bang Bang"
16. "Who You Are"
17. "Play"
18. "Domino"
19. "Price Tag"

=== Tour dates ===
| Date | City | Country | Venue |
Europe
| 13 April 2019 | Zermatt | Switzerland | Zeltbühne |
| 15 April 2019 | Munich | Germany | TonHalle |
| 17 April 2019 | Berlin | Germany | Columbiahalle |
| 18 April 2019 | Hamburg | Germany | Mehr! Theater |
| 21 April 2019 | Luxembourg City | Luxembourg | Den Atelier |
| 23 April 2019 | Prague | Czech Republic | Forum Karlín |
Asia
| 26 April 2019 | Seoul | South Korea | KSPO DOme |
Europe
| 27 April 2019 | Baku | Azerbaijan | Baku Crystal Hall |
| 6 July 2019 | Constanța | Romania | Reyna Beach |
| 8 July 2019 | Paris | France | Le Trianon |
| 10 July 2019 | Cascais | Portugal | Hipódromo Manuel Possolo |
| 11 July 2019 | Henley-on-Thames | England | Banks of the River Thames |
| 13 July 2019 | Brentwood | England | Brentwood Centre |
| 3 August 2019 | Amsterdam | Netherlands | NDSM Werf |
| 4 August 2019 | Brighton | England | Preston Park (Brighton Pride) |
| 6 August 2019 | Shekvetili | Georgia | Black Sea Arena |
| 10 August 2019 | Ascot | England | Ascot Racecourse |
| 12 August 2019 | Peralada | Spain | Peralada Castle |
| 16 August 2019 | Marbella | Spain | Auditorio Starlite |
South America
| 27 September 2019 | São Paulo | Brazil | Espaço das Américas |
| 29 September 2019 | Rio de Janeiro | Brazil | Parque dos Atletas |
| 1 October 2019 | Buenos Aires | Argentina | Estadio Luna Park |

== No Secrets Tour ==
No Secrets Tour
- Concert by Jessie J
- Associated album: Don't Tease Me with a Good Time
- Start date: 21 January 2026
- End date: 30 August 2026
- Legs: 3
- No. of shows: 4 in Asia; 9 in North America; 25 in Europe; 38 total

=== Setlist ===
The following setlist was obtained from the concert held on 21 January 2026, at the CenterStage Theater in Atlanta, United States. It does not represent all concerts for the duration of the tour.

1. "Feel It On Me"
2. "Do It Like a Dude"
3. "Price Tag"
4. "No Secrets"
5. "If I Save You"
6. "Queen"
7. "Nobody's Perfect"
8. "Believe In Magic"
9. "Who You Are"
10. "I'll Never Know Why"
11. "Sonflower"
12. "Complicated"
13. "Bang Bang"
14. "California"
15. "Domino"
16. "H.A.P.P.Y"
17. "Living My Best Life"
18. "The Award Goes To"

=== Tour dates ===
| Date | City | Country | Venue |
North America
| 21 January 2026 | Atlanta | United States | CenterStage Theater |
| 23 January 2026 | Washington, D.C. | United States | Howard Theater |
| 27 January 2026 | Philadelphia | United States | Theatre of Living Arts |
| 28 January 2026 | New York City | United States | Irving Plaza |
| 30 January 2026 | Chicago | United States | House of Blues |
| 31 January 2026 | Minneapolis | United States | First Avenue |
| 3 February 2026 | Denver | United States | Summit |
| 5 February 2026 | Las Vegas | United States | House of Blues |
| 6 February 2026 | Los Angeles | United States | The United Theater on Broadway |
Asia
| 13 March 2026 | Shenzhen | China | Shenzhen Bay Sports Center |
| 15 March 2026 | Beijing | China | Capital Indoor Arena |
| 20 March 2026 | Hangzhou | China | Olympic Sports Center |
| 22 March 2026 | Shanghai | China | Shanghai Oriental Sports Center |
Europe
| 7 April 2026 | Birmingham | United Kingdom | Symphony Hall |
| 8 April 2026 | London | United Kingdom | Palladium |
| 10 April 2026 | Liverpool | United Kingdom | Phillamornic Hall |
| 11 April 2026 | Leeds | United Kingdom | O2 Academy Leeds |
| 13 April 2026 | Manchester | United Kingdom | Albert Hall |
| 14 April 2026 | Glasgow | United Kingdom | SECC Armadillo |
| 21 April 2026 | Amsterdam | Netherlands | Paradiso |
| 22 April 2026 | Brussels | Belgium | La Madeleine |
| 23 April 2026 | Cologne | Germany | E-Werk |
| 26 April 2026 | Paris | France | La Cigale |
| 1 May 2026 | Cheltenham | United Kingdom | Cheltenham Jazz Festival |
| 21 May 2026 | Bristol | United Kingdom | Good Times Live Festival |
| 30 May 2026 | London | United Kingdom | Mighty Hoopla Festival |
| 14 July 2026 | Locarno | Switzerland | Moon and Stars Festival |
| 17 July 2026 | Copenhagen | Denmark | Tivoli |
| 18 July 2026 | Düsseldorf | Germany | Arena Im Park Open Air |
| 19 July 2026 | Halle | Germany | Freilichtbühne Peißnitz |
| 31 July 2026 | Albufeira | Portugal | Pine Cliff Summer Gala 2026 |
| 1 August 2026 | Brighton | United Kingdom | Pride on The Park |
| 7 August 2026 | Newmarket | United Kingdom | Newmarket Racecourses |
| 9 August 2026 | Cheshire | United Kingdom | DevaFest |
| 15 August 2026 | Newbury | United Kingdom | Newbury Racecourse |
| 28 August 2026 | Silverstone | United Kingdom | CarFest |
| 29 August 2026 | Portsmouth | United Kingdom | Victorious Festival |
| 30 August 2026 | Saltash | United Kingdom | Port Elliot |

Cancellations and rescheduled shows

| 30 October 2018 | Toronto | The Danforth Music Hall | Cancelled |
