= Heartbeat Tour =

2011–12 concert tour by Jessie J

- Tour by Jessie J
- Associated album: Who You Are
- Start date: 17 October 2011
- End date: 27 June 2012
- Legs: 3
- No. of shows: 37 in Europe; 1 in South America; 8 in Oceania; 3 in Asia; 1 in North America; 50 in total

Jessie J concert chronology
- Stand Up Tour (2011); Heartbeat Tour (2011–12); Alive Tour (2013)

The Heartbeat Tour was the debut concert tour by singer-songwriter Jessie J in support of her debut studio album Who You Are (2011). The tour visited Europe, South America, Oceania, North America, and Asia.

== Background ==
The tour was announced on June 1, 2011, on London radio station Capital FM. General sale tickets for the Heartbeat Tour were released on June 3, 2011. She originally announced 11 UK dates, however, due to high demand, Jessie J added an extra London and Birmingham date to the tour. She announced the extra dates on Twitter, saying, "I just added a second London Hammersmith Apollo and Birmingham Academy date due to demand.#boyyyya".

There's definitely ideas floating around my mind and I've already written stuff down,' she revealed. 'But there won't be a trapeze with 80 dancers and me being lowered from the ceiling. I'm looking to push a few boundaries

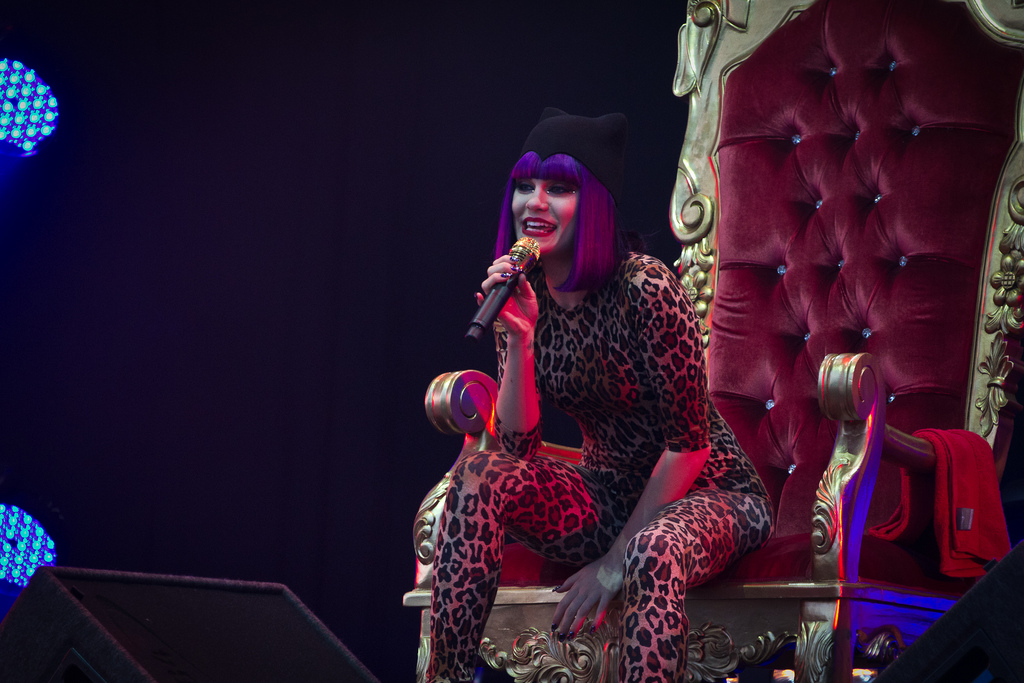
Jessie J performing during the tour.

The international part of the tour was announced in September 2011 and was due to begin late February in Auckland, New Zealand. However, the show was cancelled a few days prior and therefore began in Brisbane, Australia on Thursday, March 1, 2011. During a TV talk show appearance in support of the Australian dates, she agreed to be sawed in half by local magician Sam Powers in his "Thin Model" sawing illusion. After Australia, the tour visited Malaysia, Indonesia and Singapore and returned to the UK for several major UK Festivals including the Isle of Wight Festival and the Wireless Festival. She also made an appearance at the 2012 Teenage Cancer Trust concert.

== Reception ==
Neil McCormick from The Telegraph gave the tour a 3/5 star review saying, "The only thing louder than her tonight is her audience, packed with mothers and daughters who seem to find something empowering in Jessie J's aggressively stomping approach to feminism, kicking cymbals with her black bovver boots and grabbing her crotch to deliver Do It Like a Dude, replete with uncensored Oedipal insults and bold declarations of equal-opportunity sexism. Her other principal message to her admirers is that hoariest of pop empowerment clichés 'be yourself', which she expounds upon at some length in formulaic power ballad Who You Are. Her rather pedestrian band crash in behind her as she works herself into a spiritual frenzy ('Seeing is deceiving, dreaming is believing!')."

Ian Gittens from The Independent also gave the tour 3/5 stars saying, "Jessie J comes into her own live. Strapped into a skimpy purple bondage costume like a Primark Cleopatra, she turns in an exuberant, personality-plus performance that succeeds in temporarily distracting you from the awfulness of her material." Loretta D'Urso from The Music Network said, "The set's simplicity and Jessie J's upheld vigor were admired features of the show. Not fancy in the slightest, the singer encompasses the knowledge that her powerful and kinky voice is enough to snare an audience and keep them pinned for as long as she wants."

== Opening acts ==
"This tour I wanted to have someone tour with me who I respect, who is super talented, I love listening to and who is an amazing performer.... @DevlinOfficial welcome to the #heartbeattour #essexking :)"
— Jessie J via Twitter.

- Devlin (United Kingdom: Leg 1)
- Cherri V (select dates)
- Amy Meredith (Australia)
- Ruby Rose (Australia)
- Professor Green (Australia)
- Blush (Malaysia, Indonesia, Singapore)

== Setlist ==
Main Set
1. "Big White Room"
2. "Who's Laughing Now"
3. "Rainbow"
4. "Stand Up"/"One Love"
5. "Casualty of Love"
6. "Nobody's Perfect"
7. "Never Too Much"
8. "Abracadabra"
9. "Technology"/"Up"
10. "L.O.V.E."
11. "Who You Are"
12. "Mamma Knows Best"
  Encore
13. "Do It Like a Dude"
14. "Price Tag"
15. "Domino"
Jingle Bell Ball
1. "Do It Like a Dude"
2. "Who's Laughing Now"
3. "Domino"
4. "Up" (with James Morrison)
5. "Who You Are"
6. "Nobody's Perfect"
7. "Price Tag" (with Wretch 32)
Oceania Leg
1. "Who's Laughing Now"
2. "Rainbow"
3. "Stand Up"/"One Love"
4. "Casualty of Love"
5. "Nobody's Perfect"
6. "Never Too Much"
7. "Abracadabra"
8. "Technology"
9. "L.O.V.E."
10. "Who You Are"
11. "Mamma Knows Best"
  Encore
12. "Do It Like A Dude"
13. "Price Tag"
14. "Domino"
Asian Leg
1. "Who's Laughing Now"
2. "Rainbow"
3. "Stand Up"/"One Love"
4. "Casualty of Love"
5. "Nobody's Perfect"
6. "Never Too Much"
7. "Abracadabra"
8. "Technology"
9. "L.O.V.E."
10. "Who You Are"
11. "Mamma Knows Best"
  Encore
12. "Do It Like A Dude"
13. "Price Tag"
14. "Domino"
15. "LaserLight (Singapore Show Only)"

== Band ==
- Jessie J – (vocals)
- Lewie Allen – (guitar)
- Ginger Hamilton – (drums)
- Hannah Vasanth – (keyboard)
- Phil Simmonds – (bass)
- Phebe Edwards – (backing vocals)
- Cherrice Voncelle – (backing vocals)
- Olivia Leisk – (backing vocals)

== Tour dates ==
Date	City	Country	Venue
Europe
17 October 2011	Birmingham	England	O_{2} Academy Birmingham
18 October 2011	Birmingham	England	O_{2} Academy Birmingham
19 October 2011	Doncaster	England	Dome Leisure Centre
21 October 2011	Manchester	England	O_{2} Apollo Manchester
22 October 2011	Liverpool	England	Mountford Hall
23 October 2011	Bournemouth	England	Windsor Hall
25 October 2011	Edinburgh	Scotland	Usher Hall
26 October 2011	Bridlington	England	Bridlington Royal Hall
27 October 2011	Plymouth	England	Plymouth Pavilions
29 October 2011	Cardiff	Wales	Motorpoint Arena Cardiff
30 October 2011	Leeds	England	O_{2} Academy Leeds
1 November 2011	London	England	Hammersmith Apollo
2 November 2011	London	England	Hammersmith Apollo
3 November 2011	Brighton	England	Brighton Centre
South America
24 November 2011^{[A]}	São Paulo	Brazil	Via Funchal
Europe
4 December 2011^{[B]}	London	England	The O_{2} Arena
Oceania
1 March 2012	Brisbane	Australia	Riverstage
3 March 2012^{[C]}	Brisbane	Australia	Doomben Racecourse
7 March 2012	Melbourne	Australia	Festival Hall
8 March 2012	Sydney	Australia	Hordern Pavilion
10 March 2012^{[C]}	Sydney	Australia	Randwick Racecourse
11 March 2012^{[C]}	Melbourne	Australia	Flemington Racecourse
12 March 2012^{[C]}	Adelaide	Australia	Ellis Park
14 March 2012	Adelaide	Australia	Adelaide Entertainment Centre
Asia
16 March 2012	Petaling Jaya	Malaysia	Surf Beach at Sunway Lagoon
18 March 2012	Jakarta	Indonesia	JiExpo Hall D2
20 March 2012	Singapore		Singapore Indoor Stadium
Europe
1 April 2012^{[D]}	London	England	Royal Albert Hall
North America
9 April 2012	West Hollywood	United States	The Roxy Theatre
Europe
9 June 2012^{[E]}	London	England	Wembley Stadium
23 June 2012^{[F]}	Newport	England	Seaclose Park
24 June 2012^{[G]}	London	England	Hackney Marshes
26 June 2012	Istanbul	Turkey	Maçka Küçükçiftlik Park
27 June 2012^{[H]}	Belgrade	Serbia	Ušće Park
29 June 2012^{[H]}	Brussels	Belgium	Le couleurs festival
3 July 2012^{[I]}	Cork	Ireland	The Docklands
6 July 2012	Shrewsbury	England	The Quarry
7 July 2012^{[J]}	Perth and Kinross	Scotland	Balado
8 July 2012^{[K]}	London	England	Hyde Park
13 July 2012^{[L]}	Warwick	England	Warwick Castle
24 July 2012	Magaluf	Spain	BCM Square^{[M]}
24 July 2012	Sant Antoni de Portmany	Spain	Eden^{[N]}
28 July 2012^{[O]}	Constanța	Romania	H2O Beach
5 August 2012^{[P]}	Zambujeira do Mar	Portugal	Herdade da Casa Branca
9 August 2012^{[Q]}	Esher	England	Sandown Park Racecourse
18 August 2012^{[R]}	Newbury	England	Newbury Racecourse
25 August 2012^{[S]}	Alnwick	England	Alnwick Castle
8 September 2012^{[T]}	Gibraltar City	Gibraltar	Victoria Stadium
9 September 2012^{[U]}	London	England	Hyde Park
14 September 2012^{[V]}	London	England	Under the Bridge
21 September 2012^{[W]}	London	England	The Roundhouse

Festivals and other miscellaneous performances

^{A} This concert was part of the "F1 Rocks São Paulo"
^{B} This concert was part of the "Jingle Bell Ball"
^{C} These concerts were part of the "Future Music Festival"
^{D} This concert was part of the "Teenage Cancer Trust"
^{E} This concert was part of the "Summertime Ball"
^{F} This concert was part of the "Isle of Wight Festival"
^{G} This concert was part of the "Radio 1's Big Weekend"
^{H} This concert was part of the "Belgrade Calling Festival"
^{I} This concert was part of "Live at the Marquee"
^{J} This concert was part of "T in the Park"
^{K} This concert was part of "Wireless Festival"
^{L} This concert was part of "Warwick Castle Ultimate Pop"

^{M} This concert was part of "Mallorca Live"
^{N} This concert was part of "Ibiza Live"
^{O} This concert was part of the "Orange Summer Party"
^{P} This concert was part of "Festival Sudoeste"
^{Q} This concert was part of the "Sandown Park Music Nights"
^{R} This concert was part of "Party in the Paddock"
^{S} This concert was part of the "Alnwick Castle Summer Concert Series"
^{T} This concert was part of the "Gibraltar Music Festival"
^{U} This concert was part of the "BBC Radio 2: Live in Hyde Park"
^{V} This concert was part of the "Mastercard Priceless Gig"
^{W} This concert was part of the "iTunes Festival"

Cancellations and rescheduled shows

28 February 2012	Auckland, New Zealand	Vector Arena	Cancelled
4 March 2012	Joondalup, Australia	Arena Joondalup	Cancelled; a part of the "Future Music Festival".
5 March 2012	Perth, Australia	Challenge Stadium	Cancelled
2 July 2012	Cork	The Docklands	Moved to 3 July 2012; a part of "Live at the Marquee".
21 July 2012	Alnwick, England	Alnwick Castle	Moved to 25 August 2012; a part of the "Alnwick Castle Summer Concert Series".
