= Domino (Jessie J song) =

2011 single by Jessie J

Single by Jessie J

from the album Who You Are
- B-side: "Laserlight"; "My Shadow"; "Price Tag"
- Released: 29 August 2011
- Recorded: 2010–2011
- Studio: Conway Recording; Eightysevenfourteen (Los Angeles, California)
- Genre: Dance-pop; electropop
- Length: 3:51 (album version); 3:20 (UK radio edit)
- Label: Lava; Universal Republic
- Songwriters: Jessica Cornish; Lukasz Gottwald; Claude Kelly; Max Martin; Henry Walter
- Producers: Dr. Luke; Cirkut

Jessie J singles chronology
"Who's Laughing Now" (2011)	"Domino" (2011)	"Who You Are" (2011)

Music video
- "Domino" on YouTube

"Domino" is a song by British singer and songwriter Jessie J from her debut studio album, Who You Are (2011). The song was released on 29 August 2011 as the fifth single from the album. "Domino" is an electropop and dance-pop song. Jessie J co-wrote "Domino" with its producers, Dr. Luke and Cirkut, with extra writing from Claude Kelly and Max Martin.

"Domino" topped the UK Singles Chart, becoming Jessie J's second number one single on the chart, following her previous collaboration with Dr. Luke and Claude Kelly, "Price Tag", in February 2011. Outside the United Kingdom, "Domino" topped the charts in Ireland and peaked within the top ten of the charts in eight additional countries, including Australia, Canada, New Zealand and the United States, where it peaked at number six and became her first top-ten hit. "Domino" was featured on the 2012 compilation album Now That's What I Call Music! 41 in the latter country. The single also was nominated for the Brit Award for Best British Single at the 2013 BRIT Awards.

== Background and composition ==
"Domino"
A 31-second clip of "Domino"'s intro.

"Domino" was written by Lukasz "Dr. Luke" Gottwald, Claude Kelly, Max Martin, Henry "Cirkut" Walter, and Jessie J herself, while production was helmed by Dr. Luke and Cirkut. In July 2011, Jessie J teased her fans via her official Twitter profile whilst posting 21-second clip of the song. "Domino" officially premiered on 16 August 2011 on Jessie J's official YouTube account. During an interview with MTV Buzzworthy, Jessie J further explained the concept behind the song, "People have heard 'Domino' and said 'it's nothing like you.' But I'm like well the album's really eclectic anyway, and I never go into the studio and say 'I wanna do another song that's like 'Price Tag' or another song like 'Do It Like a Dude'." In the same interview Jessie J unveiled that she often listened to Whitney Houston and Prince, so she came up with an idea to write a song that is "timeless, fun and uplifting". The song was released as lead single from the platinum edition of Jessie J's debut album Who You Are and fifth overall.

"Domino" has a beat that was described as "funky and disco-like". It is written in the key of G major with a tempo of 127 beats per minute. Verses follow the chord progression G5–Gsus4–G–Gsus4, with the chorus following C-Am-Em-D5. Jessie's vocals span from D_{4} to G_{5}.

=== 2012 lawsuit ===
On 27 June 2012, songwriter Will Loomis sued Jessie J and her record label Universal Music Group for copyright infringement alleging that the melody in "Domino" (2011) was identical to the melody in his song "Bright Red Chords" (2008). Loomis, on his Facebook page, posted a letter from Jessie J's record label dated 5 May 2010, in which they expressed interest in the song and asked him to send them a copy. In 2016, the lawsuit was dismissed by the 9th U.S. Circuit Court of Appeals because Loomis could not prove the songwriters had access to the song.

== Critical reception ==
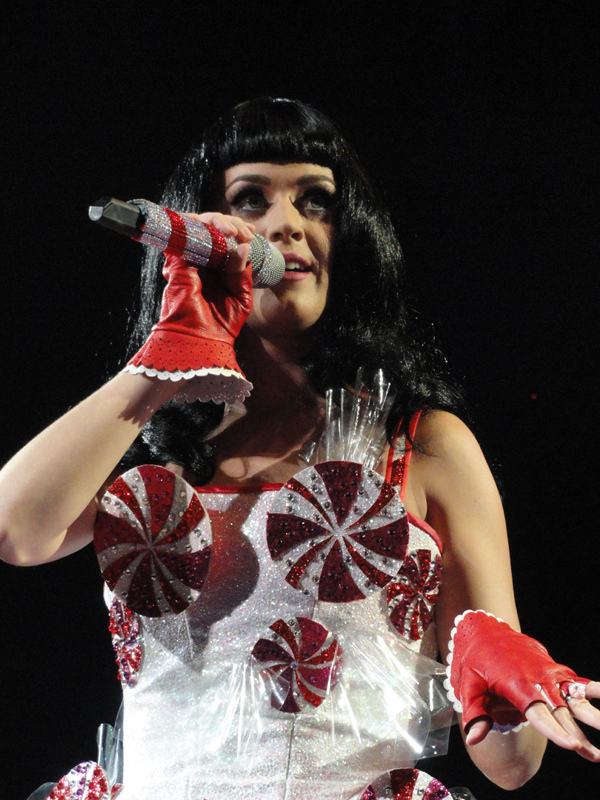
"Domino" was congratulated and criticised for sounding similar to Katy Perry (pictured), specifically songs from Teenage Dream (2010).

While critics praised the vocals on "Domino", they were divided on the heavy production and similarities to Katy Perry's Teenage Dream (2010).

Robert Copsey from Digital Spy gave the song a positive review, giving the single four out of five stars. Copsey wrote that although the song's guitar riff is dangerously similar to Perry's "Last Friday Night (T.G.I.F.)", (2011), "'Domino' is easily [Jessie J]'s glossiest outing since 'Price Tag'". He commended the package of "catchy hooks" and "saucy lines" present throughout the song, likening it to "[heading] out for a night on the tiles". James Masterson of About.com said that "Domino" is an "amazing pop record". Sarah Deen from Metro gave the song a positive review, writing "The beat is funky and disco-like, with Jessie's powerhouse vocals adding that extra punch to a melodic and feel-good song." Amanda Dobbins of New York Magazine commented, "Jessie lands the high notes just fine, and 'Domino' shows off her pure pop abilities, if not her soul, to solid effect." Dobbins called the song a "total jam," reminiscent of Teenage Dream.

Katherine St Asaph from Popdust gave the single three and a half out of five stars, writing that, although it was better than Jessie J's other singles, it was still "completely useless". St Asaph criticised the song as generic, saying "it’s almost impossible to imagine 'Domino' offending someone and just as hard to imagine people disliking it specifically".

== Chart performance ==
"Domino" entered at number 54 on the UK Singles Chart issued for 31 December 2011. It then registered a 20-position climb to number 34, becoming Jessie J's sixth consecutive top 40 hit on the chart. On 14 January 2012, "Domino" climbed a further 26 places to number eight with sales of 30,192, becoming Jessie J's fifth top ten hit from Who You Are. The single then rose seven places to replace Flo Rida's "Good Feeling" at the top of the UK Singles Chart, registering Jessie J's second number-one hit on the chart following "Price Tag" in February 2011. It was number-one for two consecutive weeks, selling 64,255 copies and 12.01% more in its second week at number-one. "Domino" sold 749,000 copies in the United Kingdom, becoming Britain's eighth biggest-selling single of 2012.

In Australia, "Domino" entered at number 12 on the ARIA Charts and peaked at number five on the chart the following week. It became her third top ten hit in Australia and her second highest-peaking single there. The song stayed on the charts for 22 weeks. It has since been certified triple platinum by the Australian Recording Industry Association (ARIA) for sales of 210,000 units.

In New Zealand, "Domino entered at number three on the New Zealand Singles Chart on 12 September 2011, becoming Jessie J's fourth consecutive top ten hit there. It spent 21 weeks on the chart and was certified platinum by the Recording Industry Association of New Zealand (RIANZ) for sales of 15,000 units.

In the United States, the song debuted at number 96 on the Billboard Hot 100 chart dated 29 October 2011, where it peaked at number six on the chart dated 18 February 2012, becoming her first top ten single in the US. The song was certified platinum by the Recording Industry Association of America (RIAA) on 7 February 2012 for sales of 1,000,000 units in the US.

== Music video ==
=== Live montage version ===
Jessie J, middle, on set filming the original version of the music video for "Domino".

After the release of the single in August 2011, there were initial plans to film a music video for the song. The concept of the music video would involve Jessie J sitting on a throne surrounded by an army of purple haired dancers whose behavior she conducts. Due to the injury on her foot which prompted her to pull out of Katy Perry's "California Dreams Tour" under doctor's orders in 2011, she was unable to dance in the video. Jessie J remarked by saying: "If I can't dance then why not get fifteen amazing dancers that can?" Another scene would show Jessie J standing and shaking her hips while golden glitter is being thrown at her. It was directed by Emil Nava, who previously directed her video for "Price Tag" and "Nobody's Perfect". However, the music video was never released. Instead, a live montage was uploaded at Jessie J's VEVO channel on 14 October 2011. The video shows scenes of live shows, backstage footage, cover shots, and external performances. It served as a promotional video for a time before the actual music video was released.

=== Studio version ===
After recovering from her injury, Jessie J then resumed filming and by 11 November she announced on her official Twitter page that they had finished shooting the video. It eventually premiered on 26 December 2011, and is directed by Ray Kay. Jessie J is the only person in the video.

== Live performances ==
Jessie J presented the song at the 2011 MTV Video Music Awards where she served as the show's house artist, performing various songs from her debut album and covers of many popular songs during commercial breaks.

She performed the full version of the song on the American version of The X Factor during the week 3 result show on 10 November 2011. It was also performed at Capital FM's Jingle Bell Ball on the Sunday 4 December in The O2. She also performed the song on The Voice of Holland on 16 December 2011. It was later performed on The Jonathan Ross Show and on Let's Dance for Sport Relief. In April 2012, she performed "Domino" on The Voice with Team Christina Aguilera. Critics noted that her performance paled when and performing the track again at the Diamond Jubilee Concert on 4 June 2012. She also performed the song at the 3rd Indonesian Choice Awards on 29 May 2016.

== Formats and track listings ==
- Digital download
1. "Domino" – 3:51
- German CD single
1. "Domino" – 3:51
2. "Nobody's Perfect" (Netsky Full Vocal Remix) – 4:55
- Digital download – remix
1. "Domino" (Rick & K-Night vs. Stefano Prada Remix) – 5:36
- US Remix EP
1. "Domino" – 3:51
2. "Price Tag" (Shux Remix) (featuring Devlin) – 3:27
3. "Who You Are" (Seamus Haji Remix Radio Edit) – 3:46
4. "LaserLight" (featuring David Guetta) – 3:31
5. "My Shadow" – 3:29
6. "Domino" (Myon And Shane Remix - Extended Mix) – 5:18
- US promotional EP
1. "Domino" – 3:52
2. "Price Tag" (feat. B.o.B) – 3:43
3. "Who You Are" – 3:51
4. "LaserLight" (featuring David Guetta) – 3:32
5. "My Shadow" – 3:20
6. "Domino" (Myon And Shane Remix - Extended Mix) – 7:11

== Credits and personnel ==
Credits adapted from Who You Are album liner notes.

- Jessica Cornish – songwriter, backing vocals and lead vocals
- Dr. Luke – songwriter, producer, instrumentation, programming and vocal production
- Claude Kelly – songwriter and additional vocals
- Max Martin – songwriter
- Cirkut – songwriter, producer, instrumentation and programming
- Serban Ghenea – mixing
- Emily Wright – engineering and vocal production
- Chris "Tek" O'Ryan – sound engineer
- Clint Gibbs – assistant engineering
- John Hanes – mix engineer
- Phil Seaford – assistant mix engineer
- Tom Coyne – mastering

== Charts ==
=== Weekly charts ===
Chart (2011–2012)	Peak position
Australia (ARIA)	5
Austria (Ö3 Austria Top 40)	26
Belgium (Ultratop 50 Flanders)	41
Belgium (Ultratop 50 Wallonia)	37
Bulgaria Airplay (BAMP)	2
Canada Hot 100 (Billboard)	7
Czech Republic Airplay (ČNS IFPI)	26
Denmark (Tracklisten)	22
France (SNEP)	11
Germany (GfK)	22
Hungary (Rádiós Top 40)	9
Ireland (IRMA)	1
Italy (FIMI)	26
Japan (Japan Hot 100)	85
Netherlands (Dutch Top 40)	14
Netherlands (Single Top 100)	20
New Zealand (Recorded Music NZ)	3
Poland Airplay (ZPAV)	5
Scottish Singles Sales (Official Charts)	1
Slovakia Airplay (ČNS IFPI)	10
Spain (Promusicae)	24
Spain (Airplay Chart)	5
Sweden (Sverigetopplistan)	28
Switzerland (Schweizer Hitparade)	25
UK Singles (Official Charts)	1
UK Streaming (Official Charts Company)	1
US Billboard Hot 100	6
US Adult Contemporary (Billboard)	14
US Adult Pop Airplay (Billboard)	4
US Dance Club Songs (Billboard)	1
US Dance Airplay (Billboard)	7
US Pop Airplay (Billboard)	2
US Rhythmic Airplay (Billboard)	32

=== Year-end charts ===
Chart (2011)	Position
Australia (ARIA)	53
New Zealand (Recorded Music NZ)	16
Chart (2012)	Position
Brazil (Crowley)	79
Canada (Canadian Hot 100)	31
France (SNEP)	61
Hungary (Rádiós Top 40)	30
Netherlands (Dutch Top 40)	66
Netherlands (Single Top 100)	70
UK Singles (Official Charts Company)	8
US Billboard Hot 100	46
US Adult Contemporary (Billboard)	23
US Adult Top 40 (Billboard)	26
US Dance Club Songs (Billboard)	12
US Dance/Mix Show Airplay (Billboard)	40
US Mainstream Top 40 (Billboard)	21

== Certifications ==
Region	Certification	Certified units/sales
Australia (ARIA)	5× Platinum	350,000^{‡}
Brazil (Pro-Música Brasil)	3× Platinum	180,000^{‡}
Germany (BVMI)	Gold	150,000^{‡}
Italy (FIMI)	Gold	15,000^{*}
New Zealand (RMNZ)	4× Platinum	120,000^{‡}
Spain (Promusicae)	Gold	30,000^{‡}
Sweden (GLF)	Platinum	40,000^{‡}
Switzerland (IFPI Switzerland)	Gold	15,000^{^}
United Kingdom (BPI)	3× Platinum	1,800,000^{‡}
United States (RIAA)	Platinum	1,538,945
Streaming
Denmark (IFPI Danmark)	Platinum	900,000^{†}
^{*} Sales figures based on certification alone.^{^} Shipments figures based on certification alone.^{‡} Sales+streaming figures based on certification alone.^{†} Streaming-only figures based on certification alone.

== Release history ==
Region	Date	Format	Label
United States	29 August 2011	Digital download	Lava Records, Universal Republic Records
United States	1 September 2011	Mainstream radio airplay	Lava Records, Universal Republic Records
Australia	1 September 2011	Digital download	Lava Records, Universal Republic Records
United States	6 September 2011	Hot adult contemporary radio airplay	Lava Records, Universal Republic Records
Germany	4 November 2011	Digital download, CD single	Lava Records, Universal Republic Records
United States	13 March 2012	Digital download, CD single (Remix EP)	Lava Records, Universal Republic Records

== See also ==
- List of number-one dance singles of 2012 (U.S.)
