= My Shadow (song) =

Song by Jessie J

from the album Who You Are
- A-side: "Domino"
- Recorded: 2011
- Studio: Grove Studios (London)
- Genre: Pop, R&B
- Length: 3:29
- Label: Lava
- Songwriter(s): Jessica Cornish, George Astasio, Jason Pebworth, Jon Shave, Carl Haley, Greg Haley, Rafael Haley, Charlie Platt
- Producer(s): The Invisible Men, The Fives

"My Shadow" is a song by English singer-songwriter Jessie J, from the platinum edition of her debut studio album Who You Are. Written by Jessica Cornish, The Invisible Men, The Fives and produced by same. The song is a mid-tempo where Jessie compares her lover to her shadow, in which they'll always be around. "My Shadow" was included on the set list of the Heartbeat Tour. The song has so far peaked at number 188 in UK Singles Chart.

== Background and composition ==
The song was written by Jessie J, The Invisible Men, The Fives and was produced by The Invisible Men with The Fives.

"My Shadow" is a down tempo ballad, where Jessie compares her lover to her shadow, in which they'll always be around. She coos, "I don’t see the need to cry / 'Cuz you’ll never leave my life".

== Reception ==
=== Critical response ===
"My Shadow" received generally mixed reviews from critics. The website Idolator, said: "My Shadow" sounds a bit too similar to Jordin Sparks' 2009 single "Battlefield". Amy Sciarretto from Pop Crush gave the song a review: 'My Shadow' is a bit of a romantic ode, where Jessie refers to her lover as a shadow who never leaves her side. She gets all breathy when singing about him.

=== Chart performance ===
"My Shadow" charted at number 188 on the UK Singles Chart due to strong digital download sales upon the re-release of Who You Are in the United Kingdom in November 2011.

== Live performances ==
The song was included on the set list of the Heartbeat Tour.

== Credits and personnel ==
- Songwriting – Jessica Cornish, George Astasio, Jason Pebworth, Jon Shave, Carl Haley, Greg Haley, Rafael Haley, Charlie Platt
- Production – The Invisible Men, The Fives
- Vocals – Jessie J

Credits adapted from the album's liner notes.

== Charts ==
Chart (2011)	Peak position
UK Singles (The Official Charts Company)	188
