= Silver Lining (Crazy 'Bout You) =

Single by Jessie J

from the album Silver Linings Playbook: Original Motion Picture Soundtrack
- Released: 16 November 2012
- Length: 3:53 (single version); 3:24 (album version)
- Label: Sony Classical
- Songwriter(s): Diane Warren
- Producer(s): Rodney "Darkchild" Jerkins & Kyle Townsend

Jessie J singles chronology
| "LaserLight" (2012) | "Silver Lining (Crazy 'Bout You)" (2012) | "Remember Me" (2012) |

Music video
- "Silver Lining (Crazy 'Bout You)" on YouTube

"Silver Lining (Crazy ‘Bout You)" is a song recorded by English singer-songwriter Jessie J. The track written by Diane Warren is the main theme of the film Silver Linings Playbook. The song with gentle piano melody was released on iTunes on 16 November 2012.

== Background ==
The song was leaked on the net on 29 October 2012. "So… :) @Diane_Warren was asked to write the leading soundtrack song for a new movie called #SilverLining and so @Diane_Warren wrote #crazyboutyou," Jessie J tweeted about the leak. "Then.. @Diane_Warren asked me to sing It for the movie *happy dance* obvs I said yes."

== Music video ==
Jessie J has lyrics projected across her body in the music video.

The music video was directed by Andrew Logan and was premiered on 20 November 2012. In the accompanying music video, Jessie J opens by posing on a chair in a skin color leotard with images and lyrics flashing across her. Images and scenes from the movie and images of Jessie in a haltered white top play while Jessie sings. She eventually sings with a white background and in a short dress for the last part of the video.

== Critical reception ==
Daniella Graham by Metro commented "Silver Lining (Crazy 'Bout You) is a simple love song, providing another opportunity for Jessie to showcase her impressive vocal talents. While not as memorable as some of her most famous efforts, the track will keep Jessie's fan base happy and provides the perfect soundtrack to Silver Linings Playbook". Katherine Simmons (from BBC) gave the song a positive review stating: "The young diva isn't quite explosive on this song, but even in her softer side she is definitely a strong vocalist who makes this single charming enough to be in the top ten of the UK Singles Chart".

The song was nominated for the Grammy Award for Best Song Written for Visual Media in the 56th Annual Grammy Awards, held on 26 January 2014.

== Track listing ==
Digital download

1. "Silver Lining (Crazy 'Bout You)" – 3:53

== Charts ==
| Chart (2012–13) | Peak position |
|---|---|
| Belgium (Ultratip Bubbling Under Flanders) | 7 |
| Germany (GfK) | 66 |
| UK Singles (The Official Charts Company) | 100 |

== Release history ==
| Region | Date | Format | Label |
|---|---|---|---|
| United Kingdom | 16 November 2012 | Digital download | Sony Classical |
| United States | February 1, 2013 | Top 40/Mainstream radio | Sony Classical |
