= Casualty of Love =

Promotional single by Jessie J

from the album Who You Are
- Released: 22 February 2011
- Studio: Quad Studios (New York, NY)
- Genre: Pop, R&B
- Length: 3:54
- Label: Lava
- Songwriters: Jessica Cornish, Farrah Fleurimond, Martin Kleveland, Natalie Walker
- Producer: Martin K

"Casualty of Love" is a song by English recording artist Jessie J, from her debut studio album Who You Are (2011). Written by Jessica Cornish, Farrah "Fendi" Fleurimond, Martin Kleveland, Natalie Walker and produced by Martin K, "Casualty of Love" was released digitally on 22 February 2011, as the only promotional single from the album, as part of the iTunes Store's.

== Background ==
Jessie J stated she was proud of the song, but preferred the other promotional single, "Who You Are". She stated that the meaning of the lyrics in "Casualty of Love" is about finding your inner strength.

The song goes toward an Alicia Keys type genre and received mostly positive reviews of critics. It was planned to be released as an official single, but the plans changed. Jessie J performed the song live in many locations, along with her other non-single hits such as "Abracadabra" and "Big White Room". The song was released to the USA iTunes Store in February 2011 and due to its promotional status, after the release of Who You Are the price was lowered to $0.99 however, in the Canadian store, UK store and many other stores, it had the price of a regular song. Some complaints had been filed but were mostly ignored.

== Composition ==
"Casualty of Love" is a slow song with a sing-along chorus and piano playing in the background. The song resembles something Alicia Keys might sing. It has soft pop to it and a slight bit of love music similarities. As the song is very calm, it carries its message well. The song has a 6/4 time signature.

== Critical reception ==
Idolator, "We have nothing bad to say about this lovely little track, which sounds like something Jennifer Hudson might belt over the closing credits of a Nicholas Sparks movie. In other words, while we admire the craftsmanship of both the songwriting and singing, we're afraid this may be too tepid to make much of a splash as a single". Amy Sciarretto from Artistdirect said "Jessie J is a true singer and you can check out her heartfelt".

== Live performances ==
Jessie J performed the song live at Guess NYC and an acoustic version on sb.tv.

== Track listing ==
- Digital download
1. "Casualty of Love" - 3:54

== Credits and personnel ==
- Jessie J - songwriter and vocals
- Martin K - songwriter, producer and all instruments
- Natalie Walker - songwriter
- Farrah Fleurimond - songwriter

Credits adapted from the album's liner notes.

== Charts ==
Chart (2011)	Peak position
South Korea (International Chart) (GAON)	26
US Adult R&B Songs (Billboard)	28

== Certifications ==
Region	Certification	Certified units/sales
New Zealand (RMNZ)	Gold	15,000^{‡}
^{‡} Sales+streaming figures based on certification alone.

== Release history ==
Country	Date	Type	Label
United States	22 February 2011	Digital download	Island Records
United Kingdom	28 February 2011	Digital download	Lava Records
