= Who You Are (Jessie J album) =

- Standard cover

Studio album by Jessie J
- Released: 25 February 2011
- Recorded: 2005 – 19 January 2011
- Studio: Scala, London, UK, and studios: Conway, Hollywood, California, US; GCR Audio, Buffalo, New York, US; Grove, London; Herminator, London; Quad, New York City; RAK, London; Santisound, Los Angeles, California; Stadium Red, New York City; Strawberry Bee, Hollywood Hills, California
- Genre: Pop
- Length: 50:14
- Labels: Lava; Island; Universal Republic
- Producers: Dr. Luke; Cirkut; David Guetta; Toby Gad; Martin K; Oak Felder; Parker and James; the Invisible Men

Jessie J chronology
Who You Are (2011)	Alive (2013)

Singles from Who You Are
- 1. "Do It like a Dude" Released: 18 November 2010; 2. "Price Tag" Released: 25 January 2011; 3. "Nobody's Perfect" Released: 27 May 2011; 4. "Who's Laughing Now" Released: 26 August 2011; 5. "Domino" Released: 29 August 2011; 6. "Who You Are" Released: 13 November 2011; 7. "Laserlight" Released: 4 May 2012

Who You Are is the debut studio album by English singer-songwriter Jessie J. Originally released in selected European countries on 25 February 2011, the album was officially released internationally on 28 February 2011 by Lava Records, Island Records and Universal Republic Records. In such a high demand and interest from fans, the release was advanced by a month from 28 March, as previously planned. Recording sessions took place between 2005 and 2011, with several other record producers contributing on the album such as Dr. Luke, Toby Gad and K-Gee, among others.

Who You Are received generally mixed reviews from contemporary music critics. It debuted at number 2 on the UK Albums Chart, selling 105,000 copies in its first week. The album debuted at number 11 on the US Billboard 200, with first-week sales of 34,000 copies. Two singles preceded the album: Jessie J's UK debut single "Do It Like a Dude" and "Price Tag" featuring B.o.B, which served as the US lead single. The third single, "Nobody's Perfect", became J's third consecutive top 10 hit in the United Kingdom. The fourth single from the album, "Who's Laughing Now" was released on 21 August 2011, peaking at number 16 on the UK Singles Chart. The title track, "Who You Are" was released as the album's fifth UK single on 13 November 2011.

The re-release of Who You Are (variably called the "Deluxe Edition" or the "Platinum Edition") was released on 14 November 2011. It includes three bonus tracks: Jessie's second UK #1 single "Domino", "My Shadow" and "Laserlight", a collaboration with David Guetta. Who You Are is the first album by a British female artist in history to produce six or more top ten hits in the United Kingdom.

== Background ==
Who You Are was one of the most anticipated releases of 2011, due to Jessie J winning the Critics Choice award at the 2011 BRIT Awards and topping the BBC's Sound of 2011 poll. On Twitter, Jessie J confirmed that it took her six years to completely finish the album—finally being completed on 19 January 2011. In an interview, Jessie J stated that she wrote her first song, "Big White Room", at the age of 17, about when she was in hospital, at 11 years old. A ward mate of hers, a little boy, died. She recalls waking up in the middle of the night and seeing him praying, and her mother explaining that he was having an operation the next day and was asking God to save him. "He died the next day so I said to my mum 'but God didn't save him'. I was so angry and it really confused me. I always wanted to write a song about the experience, but I knew I had to be of an age where it wasn't tacky or depressing and had a lightness to it." She prefers the song with just an acoustic guitar; stripped down and bare.

The album's title track, "Who You Are", was released to the US iTunes Store on 22 February 2011. It is the song from the album of which she is proudest. It's the song that draws the most messages from fans, on YouTube, Twitter and Facebook. "The other day I had a girl message me saying 'I was ready to take my life and then I heard "Who You Are"'. That pressure is beautiful but scary at the same time. I want to be a positive role model for young people. I always say that I'm half-artist, half-therapist," she laughs. She wrote the song at the end of a lonely three-month trip to Los Angeles when she was 20, having been shunted from studio to studio with various producers. "I'm very much someone that lives to be happy. It's not just about the parties and I know so-and-so – I'm not that girl. So I looked in the mirror and started to cry and said 'who am I?' Music is my therapy."

== Singles ==
The album's first single was the Parker & James and "The Invisible Men"-produced "Do It Like a Dude", which was released on 18 November 2010. Initially the single peaked at number five UK Singles Chart however, after Jessie won the Critics Choice award at the 2011 BRIT Awards, "Do It Like a Dude" would reached a new peak of number two, eight weeks after the first charting. The song also charted at 11 on the Irish Singles Chart.

The second single, the B.o.B-assisted "Price Tag", was released on 30 January 2011—also serving as the album's lead US single. The single went on to peak at number one on the UK Singles Chart on 6 February 2011, giving Jessie her second top-three hit in the UK. "Price Tag" became Jessie's breakout international hit, also peaking at number one in Australia, Ireland and New Zealand.

"Nobody's Perfect", one of her three favourite tracks from Who You Are, was released as the album's third single. It became Jessie's third consecutive top-ten hit in the UK peaking at number nine, performing similarly in Australia and New Zealand. In Ireland it became Jessie's third single to reach the top-fifteen.

Initially Jessie confirmed the album's title track as the fourth single, during an interview with Digital Spy on 18 May 2011. However, Jessie revealed that UK fans had pushed her towards releasing "Who's Laughing Now" instead, because of the sentiments against bullying. The video for "Who's Laughing Now" premiered on YouTube on 10 August 2011. It was released as the fourth single from the album on 26 August 2011 and peaked at number sixteen.

"Domino" was released in the United States as Jessie's second single on 29 August 2011, and peaked at number six on the Billboard Hot 100—her highest-charting single in the US. Elsewhere, it was released as the album's fifth single. The track also appears on the Platinum edition of Who You Are and was released in the UK on 27 February 2012 as the album's fifth single followed by the title track. "Domino" peaked at number-one in the UK and Ireland, also reaching the top five in New Zealand and Australia.

The title track, "Who You Are", was released on 13 November 2011 as the sixth official single. It became Jessie's fifth top 10 hit on the UK Singles Chart, when it peaked at number eight in December 2011.

The seventh single to be released from Who You Are, "Laserlight", became her sixth top ten single from the album, making her the first British female artist to have six top ten singles on one album. The song premiered on Capital FM on 29 March 2012. It was released as a digital download on 4 May 2012.

== Critical reception ==
Professional ratings
Aggregate scores
Source	Rating
AnyDecentMusic?	4.9/10
Metacritic	51/100
Review scores
Source	Rating
AllMusic	3/5 stars
The A.V. Club	C−
BBC Music	(mixed)
The Guardian	3/5 stars
The Independent	3/5 stars
NME	5/10
Pitchfork	2.0/10
Rolling Stone	2/5 stars
Slant Magazine	2.5/5 stars
Spin	7/10

Upon its release, Who You Are received mixed reviews from critics. At Metacritic, which assigns a normalised rating out of 100 to reviews from mainstream critics, the album received an average score of 51, based on 23 reviews, which indicates "mixed or average reviews", while aggregating website AnyDecentMusic? reports a score of 4.9 based on 17 professional reviews. Daisy Bowie Sell of The Daily Telegraph complimented Cornish's "big voice and ballsy attitude" and wrote that the album "switches effortlessly from R&B ballads to punchy rap tunes". Kitty Empire of The Observer noticed that Cornish "remains relatively quirky throughout" and found Who You Are "impressive, if not entirely lovable". Caroline Sullivan of The Guardian wrote that it "brims with infectious, Americanised songs, delivered with a confidence money can't buy", but criticised the slower songs saying that "divested of the slowies, this would have been a fine pop record". Andy Gill from The Independent noticed "the distinctly transatlantic nature of her style" and praised the songs "Do It Like a Dude" and "Who's Laughing Now" "whose lithe, funky groove carries her dismissal of the schoolyard bullies", while criticizing other tracks such as "Casualty of Love" and "Rainbow", calling them "unimpressive" and "tricked out with the showy vocal bling favoured by R&B divas as a substitute for genuine soul". Johnny Dee of Virgin Media found the album "a bit patchy"; he felt that "when Jessie is having fun she's unstoppable", but noted that "the album's problems come when Jessie overdoes the vocal warbling and completely forgets to write an actual song". However, he concluded by stating that Cornish will be "[one of] the biggest and coolest UK female artists for decades". Mischa Pearlman of Yahoo! Music wrote that the album "doesn't entirely deliver, but even when its songs fall short of the promised hype, their potential is obvious" and stated that "next time, she'll be one step closer to getting it spot on".

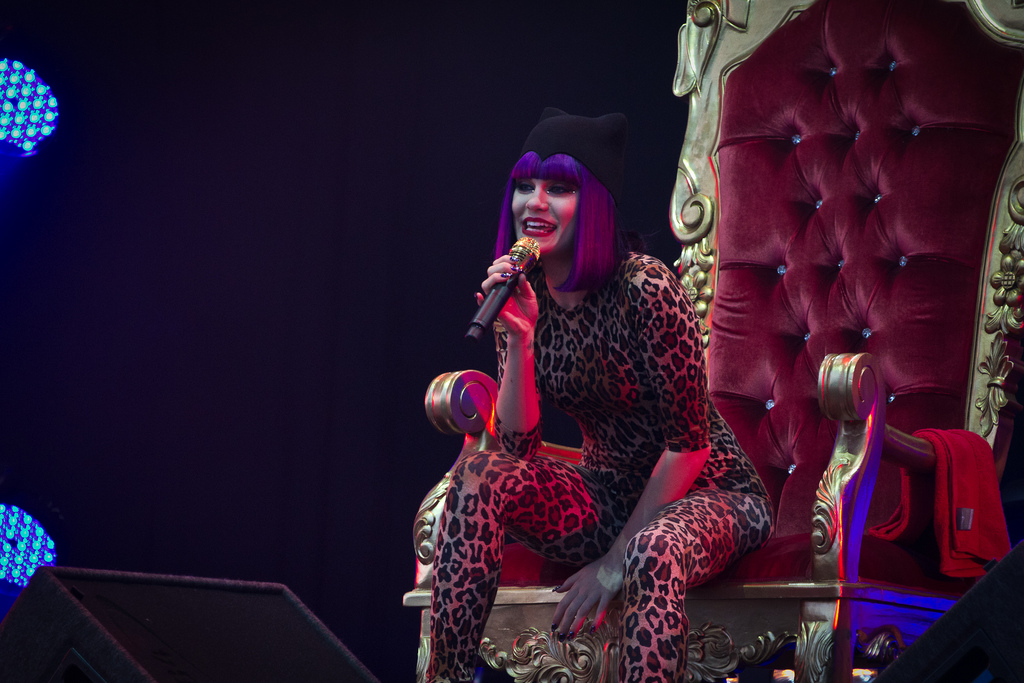
Jessie J performing at the 2011 The Big Chill music festival.

Mike Diver of BBC Music gave a mixed review, writing that "the songs of Who You Are are expectedly split between slower, slushier affairs and punchy anthems for bolshy teens" and called the album "too patchy, too hurried, the powers behind it too eager to capitalise on the artist's current chart success", although he felt that "there's ample room for improvement". Ailbhe Malone from NME described it as "cheeky, relevant, and fresh [...] but unfortunately [...] a flash that's shortly over" and noticed that "no matter how much Jessie J sings about being herself, we don't really ever get a sense of who, or what, that is". Gary McGinley of No Ripcord called it "an album of two-halves as the stronger brat-pop moments soon give way to by insipid, dated ballads"; he noted that "there are glimpses of promise scattered between the overwrought delivery and unnecessary vocal gymnastics", but concluded by saying that Who You Are "promised much more than what has been delivered". Fiona Shepherd of The Scotsman wrote that it "covers all the tried and tested commercial territory: mainly a slick, generic imitation of American R&B divas [...] blended with the obligatory hip-pop stance" and felt that Cornish "is more interested in tiresome vocal showboating than communicating anything truthful". Eric Henderson from Slant Magazine agreed, saying that "in the quest to find herself, she seems to have gotten sidetracked". Matthew Perpetua of Pitchfork was particularly critical; he felt that "the music is scattered, covering all the bases in an over-eager attempt to prove vocal chops" and noticed that Cornish "comes across like a severely dumbed-down Lily Allen at best, and at worst she seems like someone you would want to root against in a televised singing competition".

== Commercial performance ==
On 6 March 2011, Who You Are debuted at number two on the UK Albums Chart, behind Adele's 21, shifting 105,000 copies in its first week. In August 2013 the album was certified quadruple Platinum by the British Phonographic Industry (BPI) for shipments of 1,200,000 units in the United Kingdom. As of December 2025, the album has sold 1,420,062 copies in the United Kingdom.

The album debuted at number eleven on the Billboard 200, with first-week sales of 34,000 copies. In Australia, the album peaked at number four. It has since been certified gold by the Australian Recording Industry Association (ARIA) for shipments of 35,000 units. The album débuted at number 30 in Denmark on 11 March 2011. The following week it reached number 33, before leaving the chart. On 12 August, Who Are You re-entered the chart at number ten. In its fifth week on the chart it reached number five, achieving a new peak position. In November 2011 it was revealed that Who You Are was the biggest selling début album of 2011 in the UK.

As of April 2012, sales of the album have reached 2,500,000 worldwide.

== Track listing ==
Standard edition
No.	Title	Writer(s)	Producer(s)	Length
1.	"Price Tag" (featuring B.o.B)	Jessica Cornish; Lukasz Gottwald; Claude Kelly; Bobby Ray Simmons, Jr.	Dr. Luke	3:43
2.	"Nobody's Perfect"	Cornish; Kelly; Andre Brissett	Brissett; Kelly	4:19
3.	"Abracadabra"	Cornish; Gottwald; Kelly	Dr. Luke	3:50
4.	"Big White Room" (live)	Cornish; Ben Martinez	Jessie J; Martinez	5:30
5.	"Casualty of Love"	Cornish; Farrah Fleurimond; Martin Kleveland; Natalie Walker	Martin K	3:54
6.	"Rainbow"	Cornish; Warren "Oak" Felder; Edwin "Lil' Eddie" Serrano; Kasia "KC" Livingston	Oak	3:05
7.	"Who's Laughing Now"	Cornish; Talay Riley; Jason Pebworth; George Astasio; Jon Shave; Peter Ighile; Kyle Abrahams	Parker and James; The Invisible Men	3:54
8.	"Do It like a Dude"	Cornish; Astasio; Pebworth; Shave; Abrahams; Ighile	The Invisible Men; Parker and James^{[b]}	3:15
9.	"Mamma Knows Best"	Cornish; Ashton Thomas; Martinez	Thomas; The Invisible Men^{[a]}	3:15
10.	"L.O.V.E."	Cornish; Toby Gad	Gad	3:52
11.	"Stand Up"	Cornish; Karl "K-Gee" Gordon; Chris Arnold; David Martin; Geoff Morrow	K-Gee; The Invisible Men^{[a]}	3:27
12.	"I Need This"	Cornish; Robert Allen; Felder; Chris Brown	Oak	4:20
13.	"Who You Are"	Cornish; Gad; Shelly Peiken	Gad	3:50
Total length:				50:14

Japanese edition bonus tracks
No.	Title	Length
14.	"Price Tag" (acoustic version)	3:18
15.	"Do It Like A Dude" (acoustic version)	4:19
Total length:		57:51

US digital reissue bonus track
No.	Title	Writer(s)	Producer(s)	Length
14.	"Domino"	Cornish; Gottwald; Kelly; Martin; Walter	Dr. Luke; Cirkut	3:51
Total length:				54:05

Platinum edition bonus tracks
No.	Title	Writer(s)	Producer(s)	Length
14.	"Domino"	Cornish; Gottwald; Kelly; Martin; Walter	Dr. Luke; Cirkut	3:51
15.	"My Shadow"	Cornish; Astasio; Pebworth; Shave; Carl Haley; Greg Haley; Rafael Haley; Charlie Platt	The Invisible Men; The Fives	3:29
16.	"Laserlight" (featuring David Guetta)	Cornish; The Invisible Men; Guetta; Giorgio Tuinfort; Frédéric Riesterer	Guetta; Tuinfort; Riesterer	3:31
Total length:				61:05

Japanese platinum edition bonus tracks
No.	Title	Length
17.	"Domino" (Myon and Shane 54 Radio Edit Remix)	3:55
18.	"Price Tag" (acoustic version)	3:18
Total length:		68:18

Platinum edition bonus DVD
No.	Title	Length
1.	"Do It like a Dude" (Live at Shepherd's Bush Empire)
2.	"Stand Up" (Live at Shepherd's Bush Empire)
3.	"Price Tag" (Live at Shepherd's Bush Empire)
4.	"Nobody's Perfect" (Live at Shepherd's Bush Empire)
5.	"Who You Are" (Live at Shepherd's Bush Empire)
6.	"L.O.V.E." (Live at Shepherd's Bush Empire)
7.	"Do It like a Dude" (music video)	3:20
8.	"Price Tag" (featuring B.o.B) (music video)	4:06
9.	"Nobody's Perfect" (music video)	4:11
10.	"Who's Laughing Now" (music video)	4:00
11.	"Who You Are" (music video)	3:51
12.	"Interview"

== Personnel ==
"Price Tag"

- Dr. Luke – drums, keyboards and programming
- Butch Coleman – bass guitar
- Chris 'TEK' O'Ryan – engineering, recording
- Emily Wright – engineering, recording
- Sam Holland – engineering, recording
- Tatiana Gottwald – assistance
- Serban Ghenea – mixing
- John Hanes – mixing
- Tim Roberts – assistant mix engineer
- B.o.B – additional vocals

"Nobody's Perfect"

- Ben 'Bengineer' Chang – recording
- Tom Elmhirst – programming and mix
- Ben Baptie – assistance
- Miles Showell – mastering

== Charts ==
=== Weekly charts ===
Chart (2011–2012)	Peak position
Australian Albums (ARIA)	4
Austrian Albums (Ö3 Austria)	22
Belgian Albums (Ultratop Flanders)	38
Belgian Albums (Ultratop Wallonia)	26
Canadian Albums (Billboard)	6
Danish Albums (Hitlisten)	5
Dutch Albums (Album Top 100)	41
French Albums (SNEP)	15
German Albums (Offizielle Top 100)	18
Irish Albums (IRMA)	4
Italian Albums (FIMI)	74
New Zealand Albums (RMNZ)	4
Scottish Albums (Official Charts)	3
Swiss Albums (Schweizer Hitparade)	29
UK Albums (Official Charts)	2
US Billboard 200	11

=== Year-end charts ===
Chart (2011)	Position
Australian Albums (ARIA)	25
New Zealand Albums (RMNZ)	10
Swiss Albums (Schweizer Hitparade)	99
UK Albums (OCC)	8
Chart (2012)	Position
UK Albums (OCC)	16

=== Decade-end charts ===
Chart (2010–2019)	Position
UK Albums (OCC)	22

== Certifications ==
Certifications for Who You Are
Region	Certification	Certified units/sales
Australia (ARIA)	Gold	35,000^{^}
Denmark (IFPI Danmark)	Platinum	20,000^{‡}
Germany (BVMI)	Gold	100,000^{‡}
Ireland (IRMA)	2× Platinum	30,000^{^}
New Zealand (RMNZ)	4× Platinum	60,000^{‡}
Singapore (RIAS)	Platinum	10,000^{*}
United Kingdom (BPI)	4× Platinum	1,420,062
United States (RIAA)	Platinum	1,000,000^{‡}
Summaries
Europe (IFPI)	Platinum	1,000,000^{*}
^{*} Sales figures based on certification alone.^{^} Shipments figures based on certification alone.^{‡} Sales+streaming figures based on certification alone.

== Release history ==
Region	Date	Label	Edition
Ireland	25 February 2011	Universal Music	Standard edition
Netherlands	25 February 2011	Universal Music	Standard edition
Switzerland	25 February 2011	Universal Music	Standard edition
United Kingdom	28 February 2011	Island Records	Standard edition
France	28 February 2011	Universal Music	Standard edition
Belgium	28 February 2011	Universal Music	Standard edition
Luxembourg	28 February 2011	Universal Music	Standard edition
Denmark	2 March 2011	Universal Music	Standard edition
Australia	4 March 2011	Universal Music	Standard edition
New Zealand	7 March 2011	Universal Music	Standard edition
Brazil	18 March 2011	Universal Music	Standard edition
Poland	18 March 2011	Universal Music	Standard edition
Mexico	5 April 2011	Universal Music	Standard edition
United States	12 April 2011	Lava, Universal Republic	Standard edition
Canada	12 April 2011	Universal Music	Standard edition
Germany	20 May 2011	Universal Music	Standard edition
Japan	8 June 2011	Universal Music	Standard edition
United States	9 November 2011	Lava Records, Universal Republic	Platinum/Deluxe Edition
United Kingdom	14 November 2011	Island Records	Platinum/Deluxe Edition
Germany	25 November 2011	Universal Music	Platinum/Deluxe Edition
Poland	2 December 2011	Universal Music	Platinum/Deluxe Edition
Japan	4 July 2012	Universal Music	Platinum/Deluxe Edition
