= Mamma Knows Best =

Song by Jessie J

from the album Who You Are
- Studio: Herminator Studios (London)
- Length: 3:15
- Label: Lava
- Songwriters: Jessica Cornish; Ashton Thomas
- Producer: Ashton Thomas

"Mamma Knows Best" is a song by English singer-songwriter Jessie J, from her debut studio album Who You Are. It was written and produced by Jessie J (credited Jessica Cornish), Ben Martinez and Ashton Thomas, and peaked at number 59 on the UK Singles Chart.

The song was written by Jessie J, Ben Martinez, Ashton Thomas and produced by same. This big-band work-out was one of the first songs written by Jessie J and the first one that brought her to people's attention. "Mamma Knows Best" received generally positive reviews from critics. Mike Diver from BBC, said: "Mamma Knows Best" brings a big-band-trapped-in-a-synthesizer sound to the fore, more Pixie Lott than Ain't No Other Man-period Christina Aguilera. In the United Kingdom, "Mamma Knows Best" debuted on the UK Singles Chart at number 59 on 7 April 2012 for one week.

Jessie J performed the song on Britain's Got Talent in 2011. Jessie J performed "Mamma Knows Best" live from Don Hill's in NYC as part of VEVO's LIFT showcase. On 13 March 2011 she performed the song on Saturday Night Live. On 3 June 2011 hit the stage on Britain's Got Talent. On 12 April, Jessie J performed the song at BET's., and on 13 March 2011 she performed it at MTV Push. A homemade video posted by Jessie on her account on YouTube helped promote it.

== Credits and personnel ==
- Songwriting – Jessie J, Ben Martinez, Ashton Thomas
- Production – Ashton Thomas
- Vocals – Jessie J
- Guitars – Ben Martinez
- Bass – Ben Martinez

Credits adapted from the album's liner notes.

== Charts ==
Chart (2012)	Peak position
UK Singles (Official Charts)	59
