= Who You Are (Jessie J song) =

2011 single by Jessie J

Single by Jessie J

from the album Who You Are
- Released: 13 November 2011
- Recorded: 2009
- Studio: Strawberry Bee Studios (Hollywood Hills, CA)
- Length: 3:50
- Label: Lava; Island
- Songwriters: Jessica Cornish; Toby Gad; Shelly Peiken
- Producer: Toby Gad

Jessie J singles chronology
"Domino" (2011)	"Who You Are" (2011)	"Up" (2011)

Music video
- "Who You Are" on YouTube

"Who You Are" is a song by English singer and songwriter Jessie J, released as the sixth overall single from her debut studio album of the same name. The song was written by Jessie J, Toby Gad, and Shelly Peiken, while the production was handled by Gad. The single was released via digital download on November 13, 2011. The song's lyrics address the importance of staying true to one's identity. According to Cornish, she wrote the song after a three-month lonely trip. The song received very positive reviews from music critics, who complimented her strong vocals in the song and considered a highlight on the album. The track reached the top ten in the UK.

== Background and release ==
"The other day I had a girl message me saying 'I was ready to take my life and then I heard "Who You Are"'. That pressure is beautiful but scary at the same time. I want to be a positive role model for young people. I always say that I'm half-artist, half-therapist. I'm very much someone that lives to be happy. It's not just about the parties and I know so-and-so – I'm not that girl. So I looked in the mirror and started to cry and said 'who am I?' Music is my therapy."

Cornish named her first studio album Who You Are after the track of the same name, revealing that she is proudest of that song. She wrote "Who You Are" at the end of a lonely three-month trip to Los Angeles when she was 20, having been shunted from studio to studio with various producers. During an intimate show at The Sofitel's Stone Rose on 2 November 2010, the singer explained the meaning of the recording, "I kind of lost myself. It's very personal. It's about being true to yourself. Don't lose yourself in any situation you're put in, and do the dew." She further explained to The Sun, "This song saved my life musically. The day before I wrote this song I was ready to give up music. It's amazing how three-and-a-half minutes of melody and lyrics can change your life and I'm so happy that not only has it saved my life but it's saving other people's. That's why my debut album is called Who You Are." According to The Independent, "Who You Are" is the song that draws the most messages from fans on YouTube, Twitter and Facebook. Before being released as a stand-alone single, "Who You Are" was distributed as a promotional single first.

== Critical reception ==
Mike Diver from BBC Music wrote that the song returns Jessie J "to an acoustic accompaniment, and makes for a fine closer – it's her Hometown Glory, without the raw emotion but touching nonetheless." Caroline Sullivan of The Guardian wrote that the song is a "self-empowerment dirge" and compared its theme with Lady Gaga's "Born This Way" (2011).

== Chart performance ==
As a promotional single, "Who You Are" peaked at number 86 on the Australian Singles Chart, number 40 on UK Singles Chart and number 85 on the Canadian Hot 100. In November 2011, "Who You Are" was released as the fifth single from her debut album in the UK. It subsequently reached a new peak of number 8 on the UK Singles Chart becoming Jessie J's fourth top-ten single in the United Kingdom. Due to digital downloads, the song reached number 12 on the US Bubbling Under Hot 100 Singles chart even though it wasn't released as a single in the country.

== Music video ==
Jessie J in the music video for "Who You Are"

The official music video was released on Jessie J's official YouTube and Vevo channels on 29 September 2011. The clip was inspired by the one for Sinéad O'Connor's "Nothing Compares 2 U." The video was directed by Emil Nava.

The video features Jessie J in front of the camera as if it was her mirror in a bedroom. She is wearing a grey top with a black sports bra underneath. An en suite is visible in the background. Various angles of her singing are used throughout, e.g. on the bath in the en suite, on the floor, on the bed, etc. A mirror can be seen above left of the bed. Jewellery at the end of the bed, and on a bed-side locker, amongst other places are shown. As Jessie J begins to sing the final bridge, water begins to drip in front of her face. As the water falls, she wipes a drop from under her eye, as if she was crying. The entire room begins to be rained on, and wind begins to blow. Jessie J is completely soaking wet. Lights on the wall, and the lamp on her locker begin to spark, and turn off. The wind moves the jewellery off the bed and locker, taking the lamp with it. The mirror on the wall shakes. The video ends as the rain dies down, while Jessie J remains looking in her mirror.

== Formats and track listings ==
- Digital download
1. "Who You Are" – 3:50
- Digital EP
1. "Who You Are" – 3:50
2. "Who You Are" (Exemen Remix) – 5:07
3. "Who You Are" (Seamus Haji Remix Radio Edit) – 3:46
4. "Who You Are" (Live Acoustic Version) – 5:19

== Credits and personnel ==
Credits for "Who You Are" are taken from AllMusic, and album's liner notes.

- Jessica Cornish – writing, vocals
- Toby Gad – writing, producing
- Shelly Peiken – writing

== Charts and certifications ==
=== Charts ===
Weekly chart performance
Chart (2011)	Peak position
Australia (ARIA)	86
Canada (Canadian Hot 100)	85
Ireland (IRMA)	23
Italian Airplay (EarOne)	88
Scotland Singles (Official Charts)	8
Sweden (Sverigetopplistan)	37
UK Singles (Official Charts)	8
US Bubbling Under Hot 100 (Billboard)	12

=== Certifications ===
Region	Certification	Certified units/sales
Brazil (Pro-Música Brasil)	3× Platinum	180,000^{‡}
New Zealand (RMNZ)	Platinum	30,000^{‡}
Sweden (GLF)	Gold	20,000^{‡}
United Kingdom (BPI)	Platinum	600,000^{‡}
^{‡} Sales+streaming figures based on certification alone.

== Release history ==
Region	Date	Format	Label
United Kingdom	13 November 2011	Digital download	Lava Records, Island Records
