= Who's Laughing Now (Jessie J song) =

2011 single by Jessie J

Single by Jessie J

from the album Who You Are
- B-side: "Abracadabra"
- Released: 26 August 2011
- Studio: Santisound, Los Angeles
- Genre: Hip hop; R&B
- Length: 3:54
- Label: Lava; Island
- Songwriters: Jessica Cornish; Talay Riley; George Astasio; Jason Pebworth; Jon Shave; Peter Ighile; Kyle Abrahams
- Producers: The Invisible Men; Parker & James

Jessie J singles chronology
"Nobody's Perfect" (2011)	"Who's Laughing Now" (2011)	"Domino" (2011)

Music video
- "Who's Laughing Now" on YouTube

"Who's Laughing Now" is a song by English singer-songwriter Jessie J from her debut studio album, Who You Are (2011). The song was written by Jessie J, George Astasio, Jason Pebworth, Jon Shave—collectively known as The Invisible Men—Peter Ighile, Kyle Abrahams and Talay Riley, and it was produced by The Invisible Men and Ighile & James. It refers to people who have put down or bullied Jessie J and how she is living her life as a celebrity. The song was released as the fourth UK single from the album on 26 August 2011.

== Background and composition ==
The song finds Jessie taking pride in her achievements in the music industry and having the last laugh at the scoffers in her younger days who doubted she could be successful. She told The Sun, "This song always makes me laugh. I have had so many supporters but also many non-believers and this track is my 'haha' to them. As I say: 'Let the haters hate, they're like way too late!'" Matthew Perpetua wrote for Pitchfork Media that "The track has her lashing out against acquaintances who she claims bullied her and dissed her early music, but now show an interest in her since she has attained some degree of success." Eric Henderson explained for Slant magazine that "Who's Laughing Now serves up a catty riposte to old schoolyard mates emerging from the woodwork, wanting to tag old photos of them together on Facebook."

The song is written in the key of A♭ minor with a tempo of 100 beats per minute in common time. The chords alternate between A♭ and G♭, and Jessie's vocals span from E♭_{4} to E♭_{5}.

== Critical reception ==
The song received mixed reviews from music critics. Perpetua went to say that "Who's Laughing Now" seems to be pitched as a motivational song, but it's so narcissistic and myopic that it's hard to imagine anyone connecting with the singer's petty grudges and desperate need for constant affirmation." Lewis Corner wrote positively for Digital Spy that "Flanked by pounding hip-hop kick-beats and twinkling piano pinches, Ms. Cornish rightfully addresses all those hanger-ons with diva ad-libbing perfection." Ailbhe Malone wrote for NME that "Who's Laughing Now' offers a little insight, but it's via her grind and career rather than who Jessie actually is." Caryn Ganz wrote for Spin that "Who's Laughing Now, her update of X-tina's "Beautiful", is "such a tart kiss-off, you can almost hear Jessie's neck swiveling." Johnny Dee wrote for Virgin Media that the song "is a brilliant revenge song aimed at playground bullies." Adam Markovitz wrote for Entertainment Weekly that "Jessie's outside-the-box persona gets buried under maximalist production and mainstream themes like bullying on Who's Laughing Now."

== Chart performance ==
On the week of 14 August 2011, the song entered the UK Singles Chart at number 37, just after the music video release, making it Jessie's fourth top forty hit. On the week of 21 August 2011, the song climbed to number 21 and on the week of its release (28 August 2011), the song peaked at number sixteen. It became her first single released in the UK not to reach the top ten and her first single to sell less than 300,000 copies, with sales of 166,000 in the UK.

== Music video ==
The music video directed by Emil Nava was released on 10 August 2011 and it features actress (Adrianna Bertola) playing a young Jessie J who overcomes school bullies, while Jessie J plays a teacher, caretaker and dinner lady. The video ends with young Jessie standing up to the bullies by emptying a fire extinguisher on them. Speaking of the track, she said: "Music is about making a change but also being able to laugh at yourself. I think this song tells a story a lot of people have been through and I hope it will raise awareness to the serious issue of bullying." The video was filmed at King's College School in Wimbledon. Jessie gives a brief middle finger toward the end of the video. There was also a period of time where it was set at forest school. British actor Georgie Farmer appears in the video as a student.

== Live performances ==
Jessie first performed the song at the 2011 MTV Video Music Awards. Jessie has also performed the track in many live shows, including the Glastonbury Festival and the Radio One Big Weekend. She also performed the track on Alan Carr: Chatty Man on 5 August 2011 and the Radio 1 Hackney Weekend in 2012.

== Track listing ==
- UK CD single / Digital EP
1. "Who's Laughing Now" – 3:55
2. "Who's Laughing Now" (DJ Fresh Remix) – 4:16
3. "Who's Laughing Now" (Xaphoon Remix) – 3:52
4. "Who's Laughing Now" (Live at Shepherd's Bush Empire) – 4:57
5. "Abracadabra" – 3:50

== Charts and certifications ==
=== Charts ===
Chart (2011)	Peak position
Belgium (Ultratip Bubbling Under Flanders)	9
Ireland (IRMA)	28
UK Singles (OCC)	16

=== Certifications ===
Region	Certification	Certified units/sales
Brazil (Pro-Música Brasil)	Platinum	60,000^{‡}
United Kingdom (BPI)	Silver	200,000^{^}
^{^} Shipments figures based on certification alone.^{‡} Sales+streaming figures based on certification alone.
