= Nobody's Perfect (Jessie J song) =

2011 single by Jessie J

Single by Jessie J

from the album Who You Are
- Released: 27 May 2011
- Studio: Santisound (Los Angeles, CA)
- Genre: R&B
- Length: 4:19; 4:16 (alternate version); 3:41 (radio edit)
- Label: Lava; Island
- Songwriters: Jessica Cornish: Claude Kelly; Andre Brissett
- Producers: Andre Brissett; Claude Kelly

Jessie J singles chronology
"Price Tag" (2011)	"Nobody's Perfect" (2011)	"Who's Laughing Now" (2011)

Music video
- "Nobody's Perfect" on YouTube

"Nobody's Perfect" is a song by English singer-songwriter Jessie J from her debut studio album, Who You Are. The song was written by Jessie J, Claude Kelly and Andre Brissett, and it was produced by Brissett and Kelly, and refers to a struggle about perfection complex and regret over past indiscretions. It was released as the album's third single on 27 May 2011, after being served to radio stations on 20 April 2011. Its physical release was originally set to 23 May 2011, however it was pushed back to 30 May 2011 for an impact release. The alternate version sent to radio and used for the music video, was remixed by Tom Elmhirst and is notably different from the album version with re-recorded vocals and different production. "Nobody's Perfect" peaked at number nine in the United Kingdom, becoming Jessie J's third top ten single. On The Voice, Jessie J and Vince Kidd sang "Nobody's Perfect" as a duet.

== Background ==
"Nobody's Perfect" is a mid-tempo song written by Jessie J and Claude Kelly. It is written in the key of G minor with Jessie J's vocals spanning from Bb_{3} to F_{5}. Jessie wrote the original version when she was 17.

On 15 April 2011, during an interview with Digital Spy, Jessie revealed that "Nobody's Perfect" would be the album's third single following "Price Tag" with B.o.B (2011) and "Do It Like a Dude" (2010). She described "Nobody's Perfect" as one of her favourite songs from the album. MTV reported that the single is, so far, only confirmed for release in the United Kingdom. During an interview with The Sun, Jessie said:

"It's one of the most honest and raw songs on there... Every time I sing it I relive the moment that I wrote it about. I think it's important to expose your flaws in music as well as your positives. As it says, nobody's perfect. I'm definitely not!"

It was added to UK mainstream radio on 20 April 2011.

== Critical reception ==
The song received generally mixed reviews from music critics, who praised Jessie's vocal performance, describing the song "impressive, refreshingly real-sounding with a upbeat, uplifting charge, featuring lines layered across each other to the point of overkill." Some negatively described that while Jessie is currently UK's most promising singer to pursue an international career, this song may be her weakest spot and it "fails to entirely deliver and falls short of the promised hype."

== Chart performance ==
On the week ending 12 March 2011, "Nobody's Perfect" debuted at number eighty-one on the UK Singles Chart. The following week, the song fell to number ninety-seven before rising back up the chart to number thirty-two the next week. "Nobody's Perfect" has peaked at number nine, making it Jessie J's third top-ten single in the United Kingdom following "Do It Like a Dude" and "Price Tag". In Australia, the song debuted at number twenty-four on 16 May 2011. It has since peaked at number nine and has been certified 2× Platinum by the Australian Recording Industry Association (ARIA), for shipments of 140,000 units.

== Music video ==
Jessie J sitting in a feast table referencing the Mad Hatters' tea party.

Filmed in technicolor format, the music video for "Nobody's Perfect" was shot at Nu Boyana Film studios in Sofia, Bulgaria, on 24 March 2011 and was directed by Emil Nava. The music video premiered on 14 April 2011 in the United Kingdom through Jessie's Vevo channel. The music video is inspired by Lewis Carroll classic tale Alice's Adventures in Wonderland, Jessie J sits in a banquet table similar to the Mad Hatters' tea party. Jessie J is shown in a hall of doors that gives a resemblance to the curious hall in the first chapter of Alice in Wonderland. Jessie J also rolls in tar and appears dressed as the Roman goddess Libertas, who is better known as the robed female figure of the Statue of Liberty, what could be interpreted as Black-and-white dualism. After completing the filming sessions, Jessie J described the video as her favorite done so far.

== Cover versions ==
Angela Miller covered "Nobody's Perfect" in the Las Vegas Round of American Idol on 20 February 2013, subsequently qualifying for the semi-finals. Fellow contestant Melinda Ademi also performed the song for her Las Vegas round performance on 6 March 2013, though she failed to qualify for the semi-finals.

In 2017, the song was performed live by Teodora Sava when she was 15 years old, in duet with Florin Ristei (former winner of X Factor Romania), as special guests of the popular TV show Te cunosc de undeva!. At 16 years old, she recorded the song in studio.

== Formats and track listings ==
- Australian digital EP
1. "Nobody's Perfect" (Album Version) – 4:19
2. "Nobody's Perfect" (Alternate Version) – 4:16
3. "Nobody's Perfect" (Acoustic Version) – 4:42
4. "Nobody's Perfect" (Netsky Full Vocal Remix) – 4:55
5. "Nobody's Perfect" (Steve Smart Remix) – 5:54
6. "Nobody's Perfect" (Video) – 4:14
- UK CD single / digital EP
1. "Nobody's Perfect" (Alternate Version - Radio Edit) – 3:41
2. "Nobody's Perfect" (Acoustic Version) – 4:42
3. "Nobody's Perfect" (Netsky Full Vocal Remix) – 4:55
4. "Nobody's Perfect" (Steve Smart Remix) – 5:54

== Credits and personnel ==
- Jessie J – songwriter and vocals
- Claude Kelly – songwriter and producer
- Andre Brissett – producer
- Ben 'Bengineer' Chang – recording
- Jean-Marie Horvat – mixing
- Tom Coyne – mastering

Credits adapted from Who You Are album liner notes.

== Charts ==
=== Weekly charts ===
Chart (2011–2012)	Peak position
Australia (ARIA)	9
Austria (Ö3 Austria Top 40)	33
Belgium (Ultratop 50 Flanders)	49
Belgium (Ultratip Bubbling Under Wallonia)	11
Czech Republic Airplay (ČNS IFPI)	88
Denmark (Tracklisten)	27
Germany (GfK)	40
Hungary (Rádiós Top 40)	29
Hungary (Single Top 40)	10
Ireland (IRMA)	14
Italy (FIMI)	56
Italian Airplay (EarOne)	44
Netherlands (Dutch Top 40)	34
Netherlands (Single Top 100)	19
New Zealand (Recorded Music NZ)	10
Scotland Singles (Official Charts)	9
Slovakia Airplay (ČNS IFPI)	78
Switzerland (Schweizer Hitparade)	71
UK Singles (Official Charts)	9
Ukraine Airplay (TopHit)	61

=== Year-end charts ===
Year-end chart performance for "Nobody's Perfect"
Chart (2011)	Position
Australia (ARIA)	72
UK Singles (OCC)	56
Ukraine Airplay (TopHit)	160

== Certifications ==
Region	Certification	Certified units/sales
Australia (ARIA)	2× Platinum	140,000^{^}
Brazil (Pro-Música Brasil)	Platinum	60,000^{‡}
New Zealand (RMNZ)	Gold	7,500^{*}
United Kingdom (BPI)	Gold	400,000^{^}
^{*} Sales figures based on certification alone.^{^} Shipments figures based on certification alone.^{‡} Sales+streaming figures based on certification alone.

== Release history ==
Region	Date	Format	Label
United Kingdom	20 April 2011	Mainstream radio airplay	Lava Records, Island Records
Australia	27 May 2011	Digital download	Lava Records, Universal Republic
United Kingdom	27 May 2011	Digital download	Lava Records, Island Records
United Kingdom	30 May 2011	CD single	Lava Records, Island Records
