= Laserlight (song) =

Single by Jessie J featuring David Guetta

from the album Who You Are (Platinum Edition)
- Released: 4 May 2012
- Recorded: 2011
- Studio: Grove Studios (London)
- Genre: Dance-pop; Eurodance; house
- Length: 3:32
- Label: Lava; Universal Republic
- Songwriter(s): Jessica Cornish; The Invisible Men; David Guetta; Giorgio Tuinfort; Frédéric Riesterer
- Producer(s): David Guetta; Giorgio Tuinfort; Frédéric Riesterer

Jessie J singles chronology
| "Up" (2011) | "Laserlight" (2012) | "Silver Lining (Crazy 'Bout You)" (2012) |

David Guetta singles chronology
| "I Can Only Imagine" (2012) | "Laserlight" (2012) | "She Wolf (Falling to Pieces)" (2012) |

Music video
- "Laserlight" on YouTube

"Laserlight" is a song by English singer-songwriter Jessie J featuring French DJ David Guetta, taken from the platinum edition of Jessie J's debut studio album, Who You Are (2011). The artists co-wrote the song with The Invisible Men, Giorgio Tuinfort, and Frédéric Riesterer. The song was released on 13 May 2012 in the United Kingdom, as the seventh overall and final single from the album. Ahead of its official release, "Laserlight" became Jessie J's sixth top 10 hit in the UK – peaking at number five – making her the first British female to have six top 10 singles from one album.

== Background and composition ==
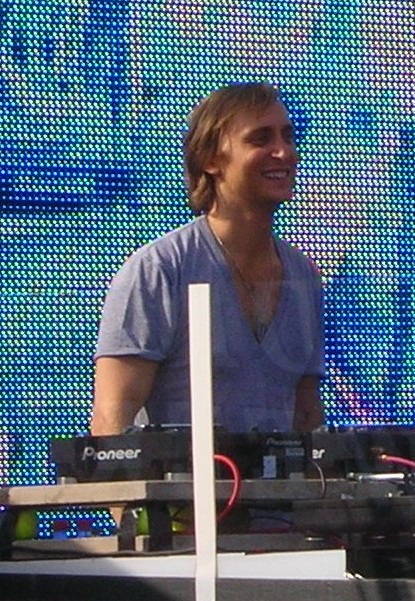
French disc jockey David Guetta co-wrote and co-produced the track

The song was written by Jessie J, The Invisible Men, David Guetta, Giorgio Tuinfort and Frédéric Riesterer and produced by Guetta, Tuinfort and Riesterer. After Jessie provided guest vocals on Guetta's track "Repeat", he offered to return the favour, and as such, the pair wrote "Laserlight" for the platinum edition of Jessie's debut studio album, "Who You Are". Jessie describes "Laserlight" as an upbeat, shimmering Eurodance and house song, that features the lyrics, "You make me feel good, you make me feel safe, you make me feel like I could live another day." The release of "Laserlight" as a single was confirmed by Jessie on 17 February 2012, during an interview on BBC Radio 1. During the interview, she claimed that the music video for "Laserlight" would be filmed during the first week of March. The video was released on 10 April.

According to the sheet music published at Musicnotes.com, "Laserlight" is written in the key of B major with a tempo of 127 beats per minute. It follows the chord progression B−D♯m−G♯m−E, and Jessie J's vocals span from F♯_{3} to E_{5}.

== Reception ==
=== Critical response ===
The song received fairly positive reviews from critics, with critics praising Jessie's powerful vocals and the song's production while criticising its similarity to "Titanium" and the lack of originality in lyrics and theme. The website Idolator wrote that the song is "the clear winner" of the album's new tracks. Pip Elwood from "Entertainment Focus" wrote a positive review, saying that the song "showcases a completely different side of Jessie, with David Guetta's club beats providing the perfect background for Jessie's vocals to soar, similar to Guetta's previous productions with Kelly Rowland's number-one single on the UK Singles Chart, "When Love Takes Over" and with Sia's "Titanium". Digital Spy referred to the song as "a bona-fide chart hit" and gave it four out of five stars.

=== Chart performance ===
"Laserlight" charted on the Australian, New Zealand and Romanian singles charts, due to heavy downloads from Who You Are. The track has reached the top-fifty in Australia, top-forty in Romania and top-twenty in New Zealand. In the United Kingdom, the song debuted at number twenty-six on the UK Singles Chart on the chart issue dated 21 April 2012, selling 12,100 copies. The following week the song climbed twenty-one positions to number five with sales of 38,983 copies. "Laserlight" is Jessie J's sixth top-ten single in the UK, thus becoming the first British female to have six top-ten hits from one album (Who You Are).

== Music video ==
During Jessie J's show in Melbourne (7 March 2012) on her worldwide Heartbeat Tour, she announced that the editing on the "Laserlight" video was finished and was ready to be released.

The full music video premiered on Jessie J's VEVO on YouTube, 9 April 2012. David Guetta does not make a cameo appearance in the video. The video is directed by Emil Nava.

== Formats and track listings ==
- Digital download
1. "Laserlight" (featuring David Guetta) – 3:32
- Digital download – remix
1. "LaserLight" (Daddy's Groove Remix) – 5:07
- CD single
1. "Laserlight" (radio edit) – 3:32
2. "Laserlight" (Daddy's Groove Remix) – 5:07
3. "Laserlight" (extended mix) – 5:26

== Credits and personnel ==
- Jessica Cornish – songwriter, vocals
- The Invisible Men – songwriter, original production, vocal recording
- David Guetta – songwriter, producer, mixing, mastering
- Giorgio Tuinfort – songwriter, producer
- Frederic Riesterer – songwriter, producer
- Tom Coyne – mastering

Credits adapted from Who You Are album liner notes.

== Charts ==
=== Weekly charts ===
| Chart (2012) | Peak position |
|---|---|
| Australia (ARIA) | 48 |
| Belgium (Ultratop 50 Flanders) | 50 |
| Belgium (Ultratip Bubbling Under Wallonia) | 8 |
| Belgium Dance (Ultratop Flanders) | 14 |
| Ireland (IRMA) | 9 |
| Japan (Japan Hot 100) | 97 |
| New Zealand (Recorded Music NZ) | 19 |
| Scotland (OCC) | 4 |
| Slovakia (Rádio Top 100) | 16 |
| UK Singles (OCC) | 5 |

=== Year-end charts ===
| Chart (2012) | Position |
|---|---|
| UK Singles (OCC) | 70 |

== Certifications ==
| Region | Certification | Certified units/sales |
|---|---|---|
| Australia (ARIA) | Gold | 35,000^{‡} |
| United Kingdom (BPI) | Gold | 400,000^{‡} |
^{‡} Sales+streaming figures based on certification alone.

== Release history ==
| Region | Date | Format | Label |
|---|---|---|---|
| Germany | 4 May 2012 | Digital download | Universal Republic Records |
| United Kingdom | 13 May 2012 | Digital download | Lava Records |
| United Kingdom | 14 May 2012 | Radio airplay | Lava Records |
