= Do It like a Dude =

2010 single by Jessie J

Single by Jessie J

from the album Who You Are
- Released: 18 November 2010
- Recorded: 2009
- Studio: Grove Studios (London, England)
- Genre: R&B
- Length: 3:15
- Label: Lava; Island
- Songwriters: Jessica Cornish; George Astasio; Jason Pebworth; Jon Shave; Kyle Abrahams; Peter Ighile
- Producers: The Invisible Men; Parker & James

Jessie J singles chronology
"Do It like a Dude" (2010)	"Price Tag" (2011)

Music video
- "Do It like a Dude" on YouTube

"Do It like a Dude" is the debut single by British singer-songwriter Jessie J. The song was released as the lead single from her debut studio album, Who You Are. It was released as a download in November 2010 in the United Kingdom with a physical release in January 2011. "Do It like a Dude" peaked at number two on the UK singles chart. Outside the United Kingdom, "Do It like a Dude" peaked within the top ten of the charts in New Zealand. "Do It like a Dude" was awarded Best Song at the 2011 MOBO Awards.

Jessie J co-wrote the song with The Invisible Men members George Astasio and Jason Pebworth, who were former members of Orson and had penned hits for Sugababes ("Easy"), Noisettes ("Never Forget You") and Gabriella Cilmi ("On a Mission"); Jon Shave, who is also part of The Invisible Men, but had also been part of Xenomania; Kyle Abrahams, who had worked with Chipmunk and N-Dubz; and Parker Ighile, who wrote "Oopsy Daisy", a UK number-one hit for Chipmunk. Although "Do It like a Dude" was Jessie's debut single, she had previously written songs for other artists, including Miley Cyrus's international hit "Party in the U.S.A." The track was produced by The Invisible Men and Parker & James.

== Background ==
I was writing some songs in the studio, but I was bored with the song I was writing and there were two boys—two producers called Parker and James—and one of them wears [his] trousers ridiculously low. So I just started free styling like a dude, and it was fun. I wanted to write a song that was tongue-in-cheek and a parody of a stereotypical male. But also, I wanted the song to be empowering for girls, but not kind of an "I hate men" song – because I don't, and I don't say that in the song. It's about feeling hardcore.

— Jessie J

"Do It like a Dude" was written by Jessie J, George Astasio, Jason Pebworth, Jon Shave, Kyle Abrahams and Peter Ighile and was produced by The Invisible Men and Parker & James. Cornish originally wrote the song with Rihanna in mind because "Rude Boy" was released at the time, partly inspiring Cornish to write the song. She then sent the song to her label, Island Records, before sending it to Rihanna's management. Island then insisted the song become Cornish's first single, since they thought it was 'amazing'.

In 2014, after "Bang Bang", her collaboration with Ariana Grande and Nicki Minaj, Cornish revealed she had tried getting Minaj on "Do It like a Dude" but it had "never happened". However, Minaj denied this, saying that she wanted to appear on the track, but no one ever asked her.

== Composition ==
"Do It like a Dude"
A 19-second sample of "Do It like a Dude" by Jessie J, where the chorus is heard.

"Do It like a Dude" is an R&B song which features hip hop beats and rock riffs. According to the sheet music published by Sony/ATV Music Publishing at Musinotes.com, "Do It like a Dude" is set in common time with a tempo of 140 beats per minute. Written in the key of D minor, the song features a basic chord progression of Dm–F–C–B♭. J's voice spans from the low note of A_{3} to the high note of C_{6}. According to PopMatters' Max Feldman, J speaks patois on the song. J said to Artistdirect that "Do It like a Dude" is about equality and self-confidence.

== Critical reception ==
Stephen Thomas Erlewine from AllMusic said that "Do It like a Dude" was one of the best tracks from Who You Are. Nick Levine of Digital Spy gave the song a positive review stating, "Now here's how to make an entrance into the capricious, peacock-packed party of pop." Rolling Stone's Erika Berlin awarded the "fierce" song three out of five stars and praised its chorus. Max Feldman of PopMatters called the song's chorus "chunky and cheeky, with some infectious chilli-infused pre-choral warbling", but criticised J's "patois" vocals.

== Chart performance ==
In the United Kingdom, "Do It like a Dude" debuted on the UK singles chart at number 25 on 28 November 2010 as the third highest new entry of the week. Following a decline during December, the single climbed 13 places to number 21 on 26 December and again climbed a further 3 places the week after to a number 18. Following the announcement that Jessie J had topped the BBC's Sound of 2011 poll, "Do It like a Dude" propelled 13 places into the top 10 at number 5 on 9 January 2011. On its second week in the Top 10, the single climbed 3 places to a peak of number 2; being beaten to the top spot only by Bruno Mars' "Grenade". The single has now gone on to sell 573,000 copies in the UK alone.

In the Republic of Ireland, the single peaked at number 11 on the Irish Singles Chart.

== Music video ==
The video was filmed on 25 and 26 October 2010, The video was directed by Emil Nava, An explicit version premiered 9 November 2010 and a clean version the next day on 4 Music. In the music video for "Price Tag", as J says the words "video hoes", a scene of her wearing the same outfit as in her "Do It like a Dude" video.

The video begins with a close-up shot of Jessie's black bejeweled lips as she sings. The scene then intercuts with: someone being tattooed, a woman slicing a pig's trotter, a woman doing some chemical experiments and licking a bottle of "poison", before following Jessie dancing in an orange hoodie and entering the flat where alt-looking women are seen throughout the video. The video also features Jessie dancing with back-up dancers, and a party with people acting fiercely. The video ends with Jessie, clad in a revealing, plunging white top and black costume bra, shaking her head exaggeratedly and laying down, disappearing from the scene.

== Live performances ==
Jessie J performed an acoustic rendition of "Do It like a Dude" at the 2011 Brit Awards launch on 13 January 2011. On 27 April 2011, she sang the song on MuchMusic's New.Music.Live. Also, Jessie presented the song in the 2011 MTV VMAs. On 5 April 2011, Jessie J performed "Do It like a Dude" at the 2011 Music of Black Origin Awards, where she also won four awards that night.

== Track listings ==
Digital EP/UK Limited Edition CD single
No.	Title	Length
1.	"Do It like a Dude" (Explicit Version)	3:14
2.	"Do It like a Dude" (Labrinth Mix)	3:42
3.	"Do It like a Dude" (Curtis Lynch Jnr Mix) (featuring Lady Chann)	3:26
4.	"Do It like a Dude" (Jakwob Mix)	4:27
5.	"Do It like a Dude" (Acoustic Version)	4:19

Europe CD single
No.	Title	Length
1.	"Do It like a Dude"	3:16
2.	"Do It like a Dude" (Acoustic Version)	4:21

== Charts ==
=== Weekly charts ===
Chart (2010–11)	Peak position
Australia (ARIA)	66
Austria (Ö3 Austria Top 40)	62
Belgium (Ultratip Bubbling Under Flanders)	8
Belgium (Ultratip Bubbling Under Wallonia)	19
Denmark (Tracklisten)	16
France (SNEP)	71
Germany (GfK)	41
Ireland (IRMA)	11
Netherlands (Single Top 100)	95
New Zealand (Recorded Music NZ)	8
Scottish Singles Sales (Official Charts)	2
Sweden (Sverigetopplistan)	29
UK Singles (Official Charts)	2

=== Year-end charts ===
Chart (2011)	Position
UK singles chart	24

== Certifications ==
Region	Certification	Certified units/sales
Australia (ARIA)	Platinum	70,000^{‡}
Brazil (Pro-Música Brasil)	Platinum	60,000^{‡}
Denmark (IFPI Danmark)	Gold	45,000^{‡}
New Zealand (RMNZ)	Platinum	15,000^{*}
United Kingdom (BPI)	Platinum	950,399
^{*} Sales figures based on certification alone.^{‡} Sales+streaming figures based on certification alone.

== Release history ==
Region	Date	Label	Format
United Kingdom	18 November 2010	Universal Republic	Digital download
Australia	26 November 2010	Universal Republic	Digital download
United States	7 December 2010	Universal Republic	Digital download
Germany	18 March 2011	Universal Republic	CD single
