= Alive Tour =

2013 concert tour by Jessie J

- Tour by Jessie J
- Associated album: Alive
- Start date: 15 October 2013
- End date: 11 November 2013
- Legs: 1
- No. of shows: 31

Jessie J concert chronology
- Heartbeat Tour (2011–12); Alive Tour (2013); Sweet Talker Tour (2015)

The Alive Tour was Jessie J's first arena tour. The tour consisted of 19 arena dates.

== Background ==
In May 2012 Jessie announced via Twitter that she would be setting off on a UK tour in late February 2013 and would finish in late March of the same year. Due to recording her second album and shooting The Voice UK. The tour was postponed until early October 2013 and to end in early November. Jessie stated on her official Twitter page: "I would like to be the first to tell that you that my nice to meet you tour has been rescheduled to later next year. I am honestly truly sorry but I hope you all can understand that its just because I would like to take more time to finish my new album. I promise to make the show my biggest and best ever and cannot wait for you all to hear my new songs." Tickets were transferable for the rescheduled dates and extra tour dates were added due to high demand. The tour was originally named 'Nice To Meet You' however due to the release of her second album Alive the tour was renamed 'Alive'. On 12 October 2013 Jessie did a dress rehearsal for a few lucky fans who has the privilege to watch. The stage setting included 5 LED screens, a large door at the back of the stage, a rising platform, platforms for her band, a large catwalk; which encircles the stage—separating the very important heartbeats for the main audience. It was announced on 14 October that Lawson would be supporting Jessie at all dates except Birmingham, Sheffield and Aberdeen which would be supported by Neon Jungle.

"Its called 'Nice to meet you tour' and it will be NICE! :) Can't wait to show you this tour I've been working on for months! BOOOOM!"
— Jessie J via Twitter

== Critical response ==
The Alive tour was met with mixed reviews: some stating the show was a "powerhouse", others claiming the "video interludes took away from what could have been an amazing show." Writing for The Daily Telegraph, Alice Vincent gave the show three stars, feeling that "Jessie belted out songs like a force of nature", and opined that it was "these deliciously retro moments which worked best in J's show. She gave us a fun, breezy rendition of Daydreamin’." Vincent went on to summarize, "Alive was a show to please all ages, and for that it should be commended." The Belfast Telegraph gave the show four stars stating: "Always keen to provide a positive role model, there were lots of mini motivational speeches and words of encouragement and no evidence of any sleazy Miley Cyrus-type antics." The Belfast Telegraph finally stated that Jessie was "A class act – who was more than worth the wait." Sam Rigby at Digital Spy gave the show four stars and said "The sentimental messages of 'love who you are' and 'live life to the full' may have been overused during the 90-minute show but it is only a small complaint in what was a momentous night in Jessie J's career. Despite the focus on Jessie's voice, it didn't come at the expense of a visually pleasing production."

== Special guests ==
- Lawson (support act for all dates except Birmingham, Sheffield, and Aberdeen)
- Neon Jungle (support act for Birmingham and Sheffield dates only)
- Olivia Somerlyn

== Set list ==
Phase 1 – 'Awake'

1. "Big White Room"
2. "Thunder"
3. "Breathe"

Phase 2 – 'Love'

1. "Sexy Lady"
2. "Domino"
3. "Daydreamin'"
4. "LaserLight"

Phase 3 – 'Instinct'

1. "Excuse My Rude"
2. "Do It like a Dude"
3. "Nobody's Perfect"
4. "Wild"

Phase 4 – 'Value'

1. "Who You Are"
2. "Conquer The World"
3. "Harder We Fall"

Phase 5 – 'Energy'

1. "Gold"
2. "Alive"
3. "Price Tag"
4. "It's My Party"

== Tour dates ==
Date	City	Country	Venue
South America
15 September 2013	Rio de Janeiro	Brazil	Rock in Rio
Europe & Asia
23 September 2013 (Note: The show of 23 September 2013 in London at the Roundhouse was part of the 2013 iTunes Festival.)	London	England	Roundhouse (venue)
15 October 2013	Belfast	Northern Ireland	Odyssey Arena
16 October 2013	Dublin	Ireland	The O_{2}
18 October 2013	Birmingham	England	LG Arena
19 October 2013	Sheffield	England	Motorpoint Arena
21 October 2013	Aberdeen	Scotland	AECC Arena
22 October 2013	Glasgow	Scotland	SSE Hydro
24 October 2013	Nottingham	England	Capital FM Arena Nottingham
25 October 2013	Nottingham	England	Capital FM Arena Nottingham
26 October 2013	Newcastle	England	Metro Radio Arena
29 October 2013	London	England	The O_{2} Arena
30 October 2013	London	England	The O_{2} Arena
1 November 2013	Manchester	England	Manchester Arena
2 November 2013	Manchester	England	Manchester Arena
3 November 2013	London	England	Wembley Arena
4 November 2013	Liverpool	England	Echo Arena Liverpool
6 November 2013	Brighton	England	Brighton Centre
7 November 2013	Brighton	England	Brighton Centre
9 November 2013	Bournemouth	England	Bournemouth International Centre
10 November 2013	Bournemouth	England	Bournemouth International Centre
11 November 2013	Cardiff	Wales	Motorpoint Arena
13 November 2013	Leeds	England	First Direct Arena
15 November 2013	Hanover	Germany	TUI Arena
16 November 2013	Düsseldorf	Germany	ISS Dome
17 November 2013	Frankfurt	Germany	Festhalle
19 November 2013	Berlin	Germany	Max-Schmeling-Halle
21 November 2013	Paris	France	Bercy Arena
23 November 2013	Amsterdam	Netherlands	Ziggo Dome
14 February 2014	Dubai	United Arab Emirates	Redfestdxb
10 August 2014 (Note: This show in Belgium was part of the Lokerse Feesten festival.)	Lokeren	Belgium	Lokerse Feesten

== Box office score data ==
Venue	City	Tickets sold / Available	Gross revenue
The O_{2} Arena	London	49,980 / 49,980 (100%)	$2,558,790
Koh Pich (Diamond Island)	Phnom Penh	50,000 / 50,000 (100%)	
Phones 4u Arena	Manchester	27,532 / 29,383 (94%)	$1,416,650
