= List of songs recorded by Jessie J =

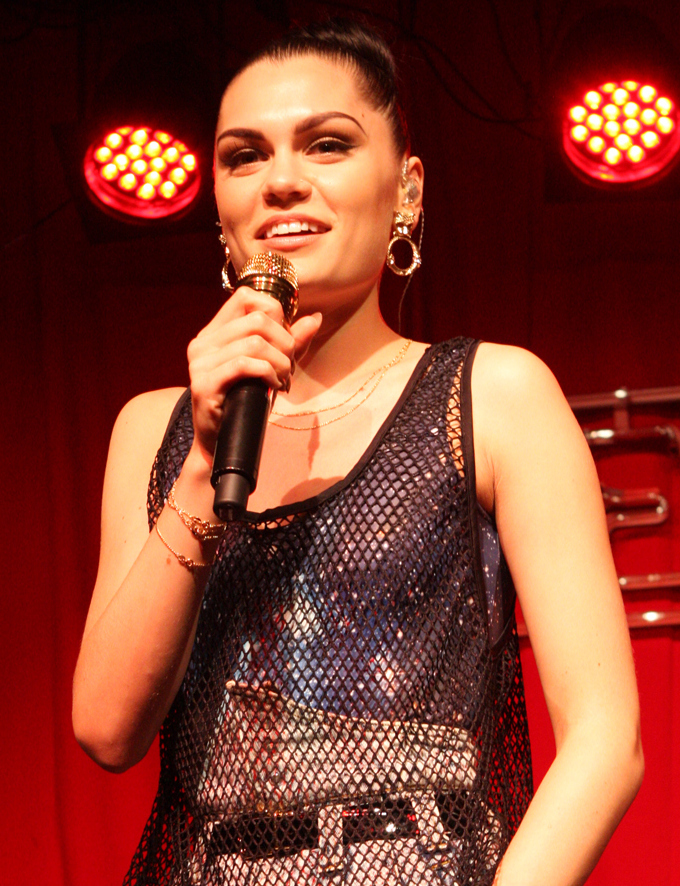
Jessie J performing in 2012

The English singer and songwriter Jessie J has recorded material for three studio albums and she has also collaborated with a variety of other artists on songs for their albums. After signing a recording contract with Lava Records, as part of a joint venture with Universal Republic Jessie J released her debut studio album, Who You Are in 2011. She co-wrote every song on the album in addition to her work with other songwriters and producers including The Invisible Men, Claude Kelly, Max Martin and Dr. Luke. The latter co-wrote and produced the 2011 commercially successful singles "Price Tag" and "Domino", as well as "Abracadabra". She also collaborated with the French DJ David Guetta on her single "LaserLight" and provided vocals on "Repeat", a song included on Guetta's fifth studio album Nothing but the Beat. The same year, she worked with the English singer-songwriter James Morrison on the single "Up", a track co-written by Morrison and Toby Gad. In 2012, she sang "Silver Lining (Crazy 'Bout You)", a song penned by the American songwriter Diane Warren which was released as a single from the soundtrack for 2012 film Silver Linings Playbook.

In 2013, Jessie J worked with Kelly and Joshua "Ammo" Coleman and co-wrote "Wild", an urban song, which features the rappers Big Sean and Dizzee Rascal. The song served as the lead single from her second studio album Alive (2013), described by Digital Spy critic Lewis Corner as "an accomplished pop record. She teamed-up with StarGate and co-wrote three songs for the album, "Thunder", "Breathe" and "Unite"; the latter two were also co-penned by Sia. She has also collaborated with Rodney "Darkchild" Jerkins that resulted with co-writing the title track of the album. In 2014, she co-penned and provided vocals on "Calling All Hearts", a collaboration with DJ Cassidy and American singer Robin Thicke. The same year, she released "Bang Bang", a duet with the singer Ariana Grande and rapper Nicki Minaj. The pop-soul song was co-written by Martin, Savan Kotecha, Rickard Göransson together with Minaj and served as the lead single from Jessie J's third studio album Sweet Talker (2014). Additionally, the R&B-influenced record, features tracks written by Diplo ("Sweet Talker"), as well as, Terius "The-Dream" Nash and Christopher "Tricky" Stewart ("Loud"). The song "Burnin' Up" features rapper 2 Chainz, while on "Masterpiece" she sings about "self-empowerment", a lyrical theme occasionally discussed on Who You Are.

== Songs ==
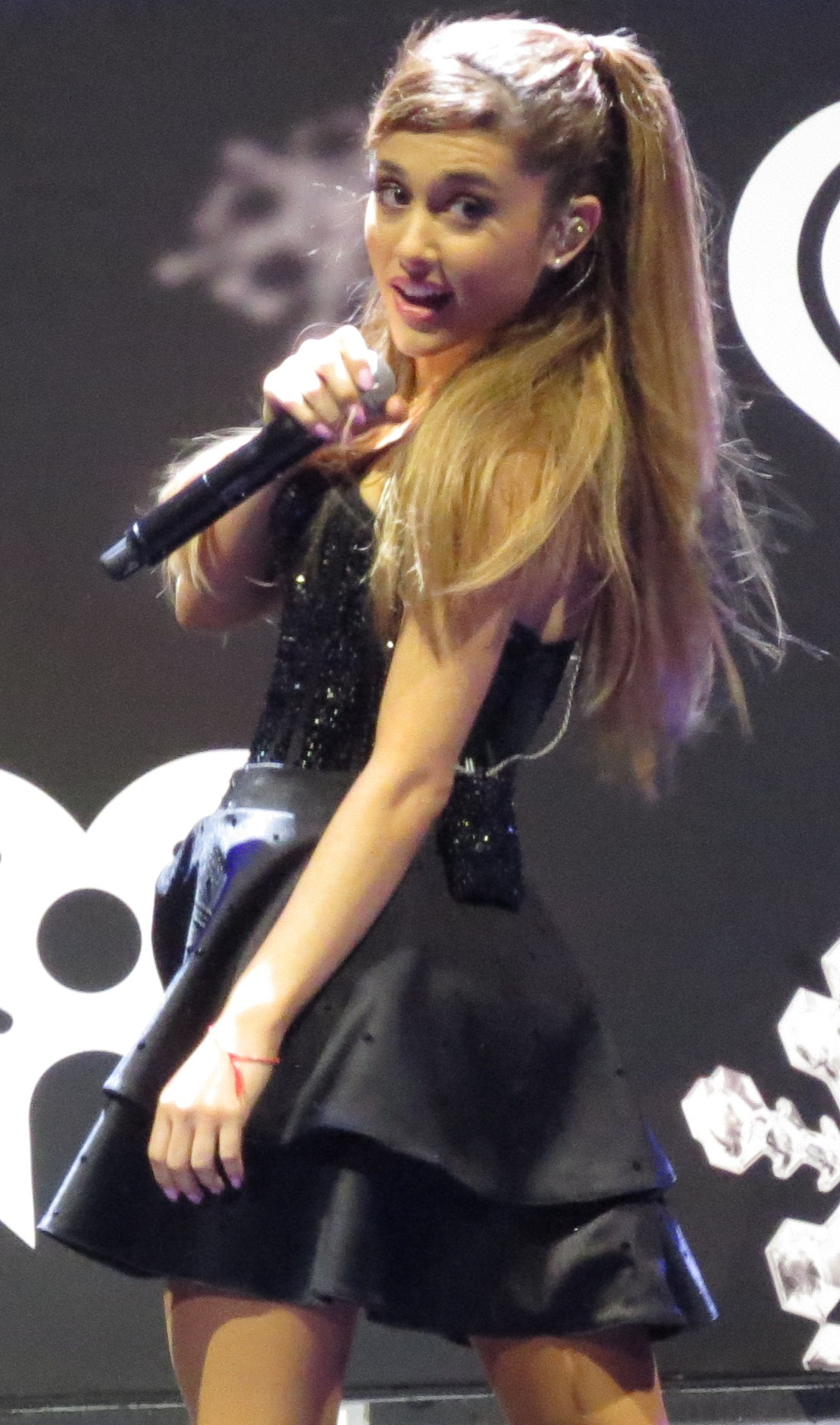
American recording artist Ariana Grande provided vocals on "Bang Bang"

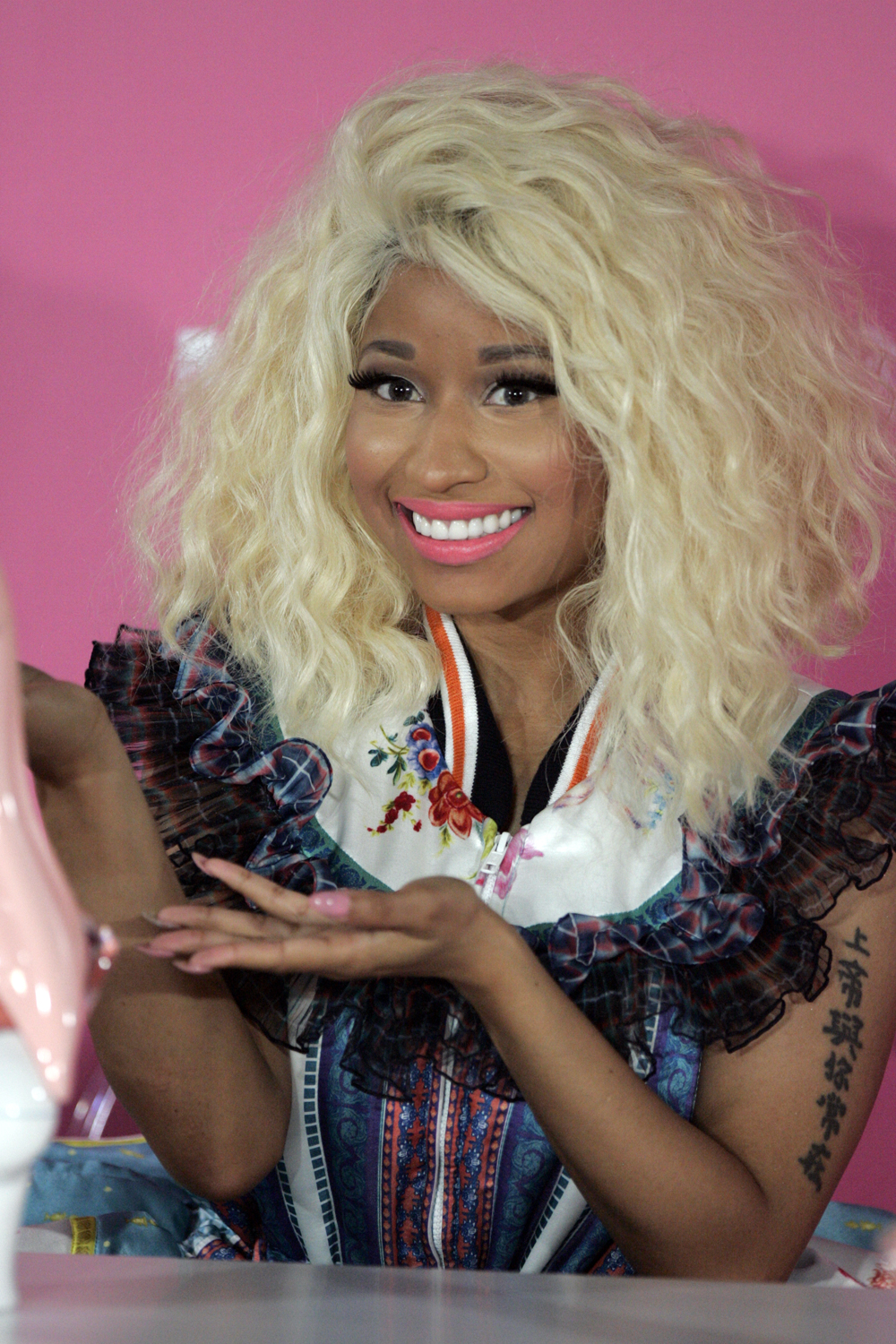
Nicki Minaj wrote and rapped a verse on "Bang Bang"

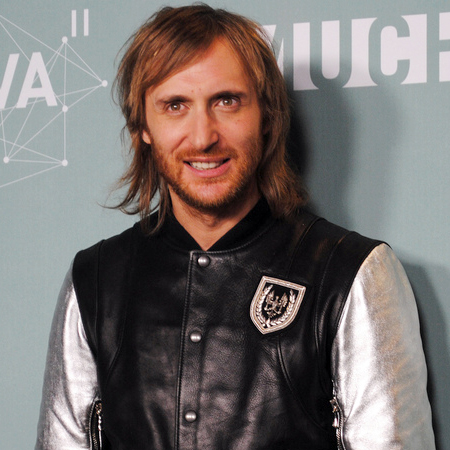
French DJ David Guetta co-wrote and co-produced "LaserLight"

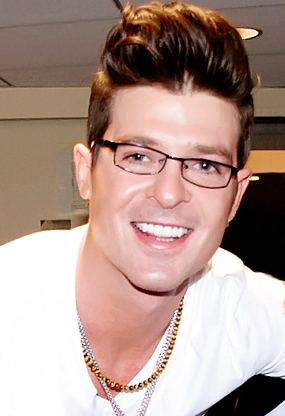
American singer Robin Thicke (pictured) and Jessie J provided vocals on DJ Cassidy's "Calling All Hearts"

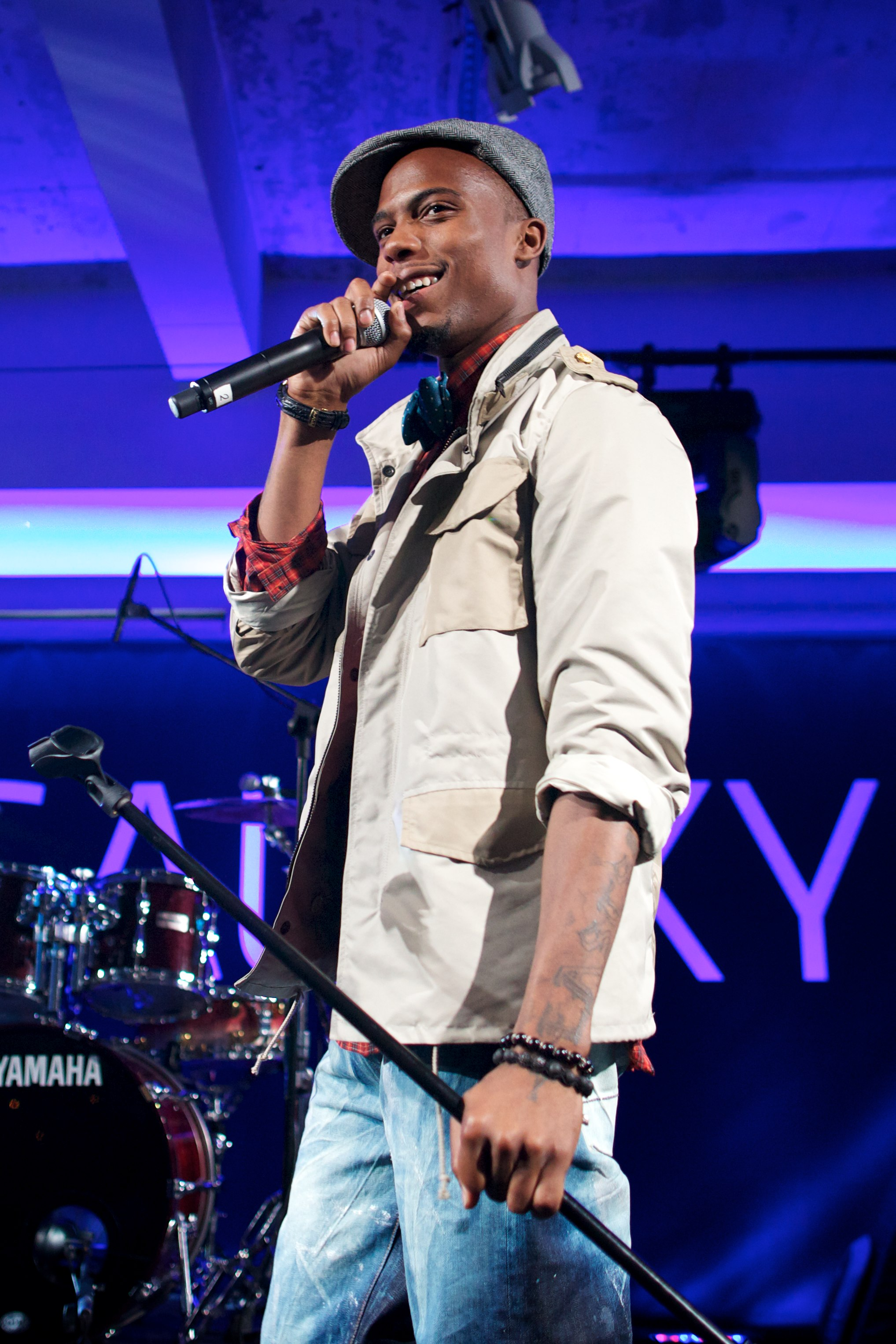
Rapper B.o.B wrote his verse and was featured on "Price Tag"

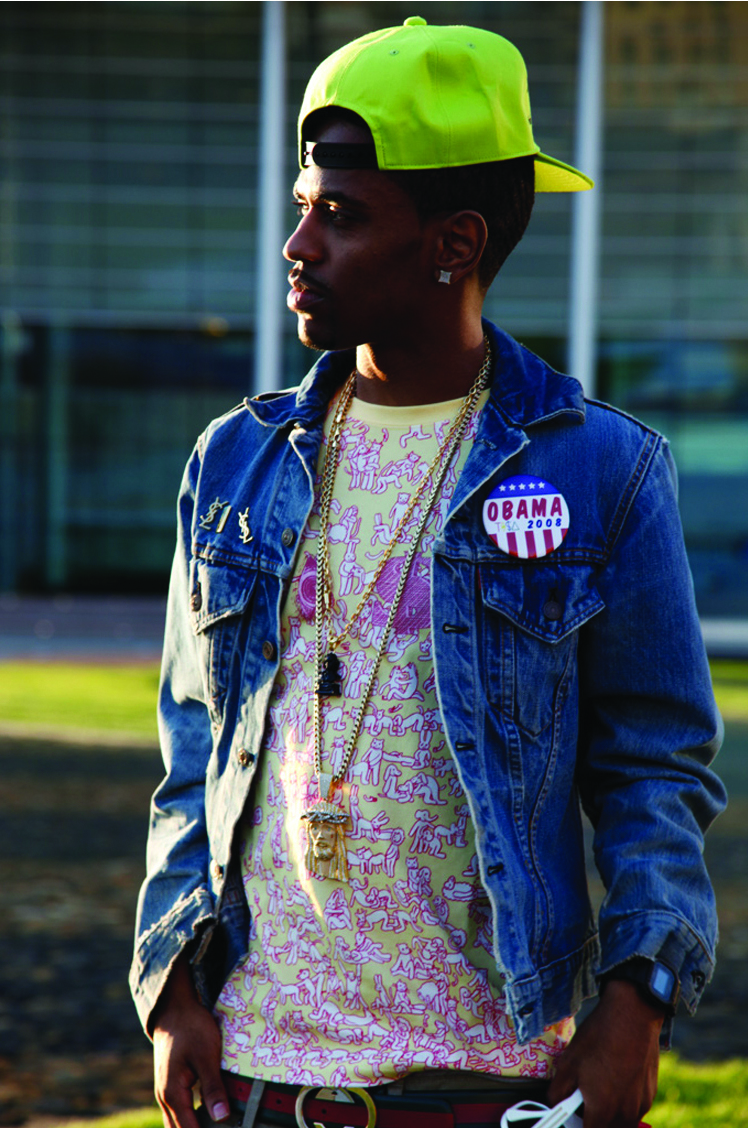
American rapper Big Sean wrote his verse and was featured on "Wild"

Released songs recorded by Jessie J
Song	Other performer(s)	Writer(s)	Originating album	Year	Ref.
"Abracadabra"	—N/a	Jessica Cornish; Lukasz Gottwald; Claude Kelly	Who You Are	2011	
"Ain't Been Done"	—N/a	David Gamson; Emily Warren; Scott Harris	Sweet Talker	2014	
"Alive"	—N/a	Jessica Cornish; Claude Kelly; Rodney "Darkchild" Jerkins	Alive	2013	
"Bang Bang (solo version)"	—N/a	Max Martin; Rickard Göransson; Savan Kotecha	—N/a	2014	
"Bang Bang"	Ariana Grande; Nicki Minaj	Max Martin; Rickard Göransson; Savan Kotecha; Onika Maraj	Sweet Talker	2014	
"Big White Room"	—N/a	Jessica Cornish	Who You Are	2011	
"Breathe"	—N/a	Jessica Cornish; Sia Furler; Mikkel S. Eriksen; Tor Erik Hermansen	Alive	2013	
"Burnin' Up"	2 Chainz	Jessica Cornish; Andreas Schuller; Eric Frederic; Chloe Angelides; Jacob Kasher Hindllin; Rickard Göransson; Gamal Lewis; Tauheed Epps	Sweet Talker	2014	
"Calling All Hearts"	DJ Cassidy; Robin Thicke	Cassidy Podell; Jessica Cornish; Claude Kelly; Gregory Kohen; Robin Thicke	Paradise Royale	2014	
"Casualty of Love"	—N/a	Jessica Cornish; Farrah Fleurimond; Martin Kleveland; Natalie Walker	Who You Are	2011	
"Conquer the World"	Brandy	Jessica Cornish; Claude Kelly; John Webb, Jr. Anders Froen; Jamil DeBardlabon; Are Sorkness	Alive	2013	
"Cruisin'"	Smokey Robinson	Smokey Robinson; Marvin Tarplin	Smokey & Friends	2014	
"Daydreamin'"	—N/a	Jessica Cornish; Claude Kelly; Josh Abraham; Oliver Goldstein	Alive	2013	
"Do It like a Dude"	—N/a	Jessica Cornish; George Astasio; Jason Pebworth; Jon Shave; Kyle Abrahams; Peter Ighile	Who You Are	2011	
"Do You Hear What I Hear?"	Mary J. Blige	Noël Regney; Gloria Adele Shain	A Mary Christmas	2013	
"Domino"	—N/a	Jessica Cornish; Lukasz Gottwald; Claude Kelly; Max Martin; Henry Walter	Who You Are	2011	
"Excuse My Rude"	Becky G	Jessica Cornish; Rebecca Marie Gomez; Lukasz Gottwald; Niles Hollow-Dhar; Henry Walter; Ammar Malik	Alive	2013	
"Fire"	—N/a	Steve Booker; John Newman	Sweet Talker	2014	
"Flashlight"	—N/a	Sia Furler; Christian Guzman; Sam Smith; Jason Moore	Pitch Perfect 2: Original Motion Picture Soundtrack	2015	
"Get Away"	—N/a	Jessica Cornish; Steve Mac; Wayne Hector	Sweet Talker	2014	
"Gold"	—N/a	Jessica Cornish; Claude Kelly; Lukasz Gottwald; Henry Walter	Alive	2013	
"Harder We Fall"	—N/a	Jessica Cornish; Lukasz Gottwald; Ammar Malik; Daniel Omelio; Henry Walter	Alive	2013	
"Hero"	—N/a	Jessica Cornish; Lorne Alistair Tennant; Camille Purcell; Marwan El Bergamy; Chase Fontaine	Alive	2013	
"I Miss Her"	—N/a	Jessica Cornish; Claude Kelly; Charles T. Harmony	Alive	2013	
"I Need This"	—N/a	Jessica Cornish; Robbert Allen; Warren "Oak" Felder; Chris Brown	Who You Are	2011	
"It's My Party"	—N/a	Jessica Cornish; Claude Kelly; John Larderi; Colin Norman	Alive	2013	
"Keep Us Together"	—N/a	Louis Biancaniello; Sevyn Streeter; Stepan Taft; Cory Rooney; Ryan Vojtesak	Sweet Talker	2014	
"LaserLight"	David Guetta	Jessica Cornish; The Invisible Men; David Guetta; Giorgio Tuinfort; Frederic Riesterer	Who You Are	2011	
"Loud"	Lindsey Stirling	Terius "The-Dream" Nash; Christopher A. Stewart	Sweet Talker	2014	
"L.O.V.E."	—N/a	Jessica Cornish; Toby Gad	Who You Are	2011	
"Magnetic"	—N/a	Jessica Cornish; Richard "Fazer" Rawson; Peter "Neros" Ibsen; Lorne Alistair Tennant	Alive	2013	
"Mamma Knows Best"	—N/a	Jessica Cornish; Ashton Tomas	Who You Are	2011	
"Masterpiece"	—N/a	Josh Alexander; Britt Burton; Emily Warren	Sweet Talker	2014	
"My Shadow"	—N/a	Jessica Cornish; George Astasio; Jason Pebworth; Jon Shave; Carl Haley; Greg Haley; Rafael Haley; Charlie Platt	Who You Are	2011	
"No Secrets"	—N/a	Jesse Boykins III, Jessica Cornish	—N/a	2025	
"Nobody's Perfect (Alternate version)"	—N/a	Jessica Cornish; Claude Kelly	—N/a	2011	
"Nobody's Perfect"	—N/a	Jessica Cornish; Claude Kelly	Who You Are	2011	
"Personal"	—N/a	Elle Varner; Jenna Andrews; William Wiik Larsen	Sweet Talker	2014	
"Price Tag"	B.o.B	Jessica Cornish; Lukasz Gottwald; Claude Kelly; Bobby Ray Simmons	Who You Are	2011	
"Queen"	—N/a	Jessica Cornish	R.O.S.E.	2018	
"Rainbow"	—N/a	Jessica Cornish; Warren "Oak" Felder; Edwin "Lil' Eddie" Serrano; Kasia "KC" Livingston	Who You Are	2011	
"Remember Me"	Daley	Gareth Daley; Omar Lye-Fook; Mica Paris; Scott Wilde; Richard Bethely; Alexis Blackmore; Robert Miller; Richard Evans; Marlena Shaw	Alone Together	2012	
"Repeat"	David Guetta	Jessica Cornish; Ali Tennant; David Guetta; Giorgio Tuinfort; The Invisible Men; Frédéric Riesterer	Nothing but the Beat	2011	
"Said Too Much"	—N/a	Jessica Cornish; Jonas Jeberg; Sean Douglas; Jason Evigan	Sweet Talker	2014	
"Sexy Lady"	—N/a	Jessica Cornish; Joshua Coleman; Claude Kelly	Alive	2013	
"Sexy Silk"	—N/a	Jack Hammer; Jessica Cornish; Justin Broad; Ashton Millard; Paul Herman	Easy A	2010	
"Seal Me with a Kiss" (Note: "Seal Me with a Kiss" contains an interpolation of "(Not Just) Knee Deep", written by George Clinton and Philippé Wynne.)	De La Soul	Jessica Cornish; Andrew Wansel; Warren Felder; George Clinton; Philippé Wynne; Kelvin Mercer; Dave Jolicoeur	Sweet Talker	2014	
"Silver Lining (Crazy 'Bout You)"	—N/a	Diane Warren	Silver Linings Playbook	2012	
"Sorry to Interrupt"	Jhené Aiko; Rixton	Jessica Cornish; DJ Mustard; Jake Roche	—N/a	2015	
"Stand Up"	—N/a	Jessica Cornish; Karl "K-Gee" Gordon; Chris Arnold; David Martin; Geoff Morrow	Who You Are	2011	
"Strip"	—N/a	Jessica Cornish; Joshua Coleman; Claude Kelly	Sweet Talker	2014	
"Sweet Talker"	—N/a	Jessica Cornish; Alessia DeGasperis Brigante; Yonatan Ayal; Maxime Picard; Clément Picard; Thomas Wentz; James Somani	Sweet Talker	2014	
"Think About That"	—N/a	Jessica Cornish; Darhyl Camper	R.O.S.E.	2017	
"Thunder"	—N/a	Jessica Cornish; Tor Erik Hermansen; Mikkel S. Eriksen; Benjamin Levin; Claude Kelly	Alive	2013	
"Unite"	—N/a	Jessica Cornish; Sia Furler; Tor Erik Hermansen; Mikkel S. Eriksen	Alive	2013	
"Up"	James Morrison	James Morrison; Toby Gad	The Awakening	2011	
"We Don't Play Around"	Dizzee Rascal	Dylan Mills; Jessica Cornish; Teddy Sky; Jimmy Joker; RedOne	The Fifth	2013	
"We Will Rock You"	Queen	Brian May	A Symphony of British Music	2012	
"Who You Are"	—N/a	Jessica Cornish; Toby Gad; Shelly Peiken	Who You Are	2011	
"Who's Laughing Now"	—N/a	Jessica Cornish; Talay Riley; Kyle Abrahams; George Astasio; Jon Shave; Peter Ighile; Jason Pebworth	Who You Are	2011	
"Wild (solo version)"	—N/a	Jessica Cornish; Joshua Coleman; Claude Kelly	—N/a	2013	
"Wild"	Big Sean	Jessica Cornish; Joshua Coleman; Claude Kelly; Sean Anderson	Alive	2013	
"Wild"	Big Sean; Dizzee Rascal	Jessica Cornish; Joshua Coleman; Claude Kelly; Sean Anderson; Dylan Mills	Alive	2013	
"You Don't Really Know Me"	—N/a	Jessica Cornish; Lewis Allen	Sweet Talker	2014	
"Your Loss I'm Found"	—N/a	Jessica Cornish; Hidde Huijsman; Massimo Cacciapuoti; Kuk Harrell; Michel van der Zanden	Sweet Talker	2014	

== See also ==
- Jessie J discography
