= Dancing with the Stars (American TV series) season 17 =

Dancing with the Stars
- Season 17
- Promotional poster
- Hosted by: Tom Bergeron; Brooke Burke Charvet
- Judges: Carrie Ann Inaba; Len Goodman; Bruno Tonioli
- Celebrity winner: Amber Riley
- Professional winner: Derek Hough
- No. of episodes: 12

Release
- Original network: ABC
- Original release: September 16 – November 26, 2013

Season chronology
- ← Previous; Season 16 Next → Season 18

Season seventeen of Dancing with the Stars premiered on September 16, 2013, on the ABC network.

On November 26, actress Amber Riley and Derek Hough were crowned the champions, while actor Corbin Bleu and Karina Smirnoff finished in second place, and Jack Osbourne and Cheryl Burke finished in third.

This is the first season since season one to not have a Tuesday results show. The sky box where host Brooke Burke Charvet interviewed dancers after their performances was also eliminated. Instead, the couples were accommodated in a new seating area near the judges' table, which had also been shifted to the opposite side of the ballroom. A make-up room and rehearsal room were added where Charvet could chat with the couples before and after their performances.

This season also introduced a new format of voting. Each week, the judges would give each couple a score. Since there was no results show, those scores would be added to the public votes from the previous week, and the couple with the lowest combined score from judges and viewer votes would be eliminated from the competition at the end of that week's episode.

== Cast ==
=== Couples ===
This season featured twelve celebrity contestants. The cast and their professional partners were announced on September 4, 2013, on Good Morning America. Tyne Stecklein, Emma Slater, and Sasha Farber joined the cast of professional dancers, while Gleb Savchenko and Lindsay Arnold joined Henry Byalikov and Witney Carson in the dance troupe.

Celebrity	Notability	Professional partner	Status
Keyshawn Johnson	NFL wide receiver	Sharna Burgess	Eliminated 1st on September 23, 2013
Bill Nye	Science education host	Tyne Stecklein	Eliminated 2nd on September 30, 2013
Valerie Harper	Television actress	Tristan MacManus	Eliminated 3rd on October 7, 2013
Christina Milian	Singer & actress	Mark Ballas	Eliminated 4th on October 14, 2013
Nicole "Snooki" Polizzi	Jersey Shore cast member	Sasha Farber	Eliminated 5th on October 28, 2013
Brant Daugherty	Pretty Little Liars actor	Peta Murgatroyd	Eliminated 6th on November 4, 2013
Elizabeth Berkley Lauren	Film & television actress	Valentin Chmerkovskiy	Eliminated 7th on November 11, 2013
Leah Remini	Television actress	Tony Dovolani	Eliminated 8th on November 18, 2013
Bill Engvall	Stand-up comedian & actor	Emma Slater	Eliminated 9th on November 25, 2013
Jack Osbourne	Reality television personality	Cheryl Burke	Third place on November 26, 2013
Corbin Bleu	High School Musical actor	Karina Smirnoff	Runners-up on November 26, 2013
Amber Riley	Glee actress	Derek Hough	Winners on November 26, 2013

=== Host and judges ===
Tom Bergeron and Brooke Burke Charvet returned as co-hosts, and Carrie Ann Inaba, Len Goodman, and Bruno Tonioli returned as judges. The Harold Wheeler orchestra and singers also returned to provide the music throughout what would end up being their last season. This was also Brooke Burke-Charvet's last season as co-host.

== Episodes ==
No. overall	No. in season	Title	Rating (18–49)	Original release date	U.S. viewers (millions)
307	1	"First Dances"	3.10	September 16, 2013	16.04
308	2	"Latin Night"	2.30	September 23, 2013	13.57
309	3	"Hollywood Night"	2.00	September 30, 2013	13.10
310	4	"Week 4"	2.00	October 7, 2013	13.00
311	5	"Most Memorable Year Night"	2.10	October 14, 2013	12.99
312	6	"Switch-Up Challenge"	2.00	October 21, 2013	13.35
313	7	"Team Dance Night"	2.08	October 28, 2013	13.28
314	8	"Cher Night"	1.97	November 4, 2013	13.71
315	9	"Trio Night"	1.71	November 11, 2013	12.57
316	10	"Plugged/Unplugged Night"	2.00	November 18, 2013	13.80
317	11	"Finals: Night 1"	2.21	November 25, 2013	14.61
318	12	"Finals: Night 2"	2.41	November 26, 2013	14.75

== Scoring chart ==
The highest score each week is indicated in bold green with a dagger (†), while the lowest score each week is indicated in italicized red with a double-dagger (‡).

Color key:

Winners
Runners-up
Third place
Eliminated

Dancing with the Stars (season 17) - Weekly scores
Couple	Pl.	Week													
Couple	Pl.	1	2	1+2	3	4	5	6	7	6+7	8	9	10	11	
Couple	Pl.	1	2	1+2	3	4	5	6	7	6+7	8	9	10	Night 1	Night 2
Amber & Derek	1st	**27**†	24	**51**†	24	**27**†	26	28+4=**32**†	29+30=**59**†	**91**†	28	24+27=51	39+40=**79**†	30+4+30=**64**†	+30=**94**† (Note: This couple finished in first place.)
Corbin & Karina	2nd	24	**26**†	50	26	**27**†	**28**†	23+4=27	29+30=**59**†	86	27+3=**30**†	28+30=**58**†	35+40=75	27+5+30=62	+27=89 (Note: This couple finished in second place.)
Jack & Cheryl	3rd	23	24	47	22	24	27	25+2=27	27+30=57	84	27+3=**30**†	29+25=54	33+38=71	24+3+30=57	+27=84‡ (Note: This couple finished in third place.)
Bill E. & Emma	4th	18	21	39	24	21	24	23+1=24‡	23+27=50‡	74‡	24‡	21+21=42‡	28+32=60‡	24+2+25=51‡ (Note: This couple was eliminated.)	
Leah & Tony	5th	21	24	45	24	24	22‡	27+1=28	26+27=53	81	25+3=28	27+27=54	32+33=65		
Elizabeth & Val	6th	24	25	49	25	**27**†	26	30+2=**32**†	27+27=54	86	25	26+30=56			
Brant & Peta	7th	22	23	45	**27**†	21	27	28+3=31	27+30=57	88	27				
Nicole & Sasha	8th	23	20	43	25	24	27	27+3=30	27+27=54	84					
Christina & Mark	9th	22	25	47	26	24	**28**†								
Valerie & Tristan	10th	21	19	40	16‡	18‡									
Bill N. & Tyne	11th	14‡	17‡	31‡	16‡										
Keyshawn & Sharna	12th	17	18	35											

== Weekly scores ==
Individual judges' scores in the charts below (given in parentheses) are listed in this order from left to right: Carrie Ann Inaba, Len Goodman, Bruno Tonioli.

=== Week 1: First Dances ===
Couples performed either the cha-cha-cha, contemporary, or the foxtrot, and are listed in the order they performed.

Couple	Scores	Dance	Music
Brant & Peta	22 (7, 8, 7)	Cha-cha-cha	"Blurred Lines" — Robin Thicke, feat. T.I. & Pharrell Williams
Leah & Tony	21 (7, 7, 7)	Foxtrot	"Tears Dry on Their Own" — Amy Winehouse
Corbin & Karina	24 (8, 8, 8)	Contemporary	"If I Lose Myself" — OneRepublic
Jack & Cheryl	23 (8, 8, 7)	Foxtrot	"Pack Up" — Eliza Doolittle
Amber & Derek	27 (9, 9, 9)	Cha-cha-cha	"Wings" — Little Mix
Elizabeth & Val	24 (8, 8, 8)	Contemporary	"Imagine" — John Lennon
Bill N. & Tyne	14 (5, 4, 5)	Cha-cha-cha	"Weird Science" — Oingo Boingo
Keyshawn & Sharna	17 (6, 5, 6)	Cha-cha-cha	"Treasure" — Bruno Mars
Christina & Mark	22 (7, 7, 8)	Contemporary	"Clarity" — Zedd, feat. Foxes
Bill E. & Emma	18 (6, 6, 6)	Foxtrot	"Hot Stuff" — Donna Summer
Valerie & Tristan	21 (7, 7, 7)	Foxtrot	"Some Kind of Wonderful" — The Drifters
Nicole & Sasha	23 (8, 8, 7)	Cha-cha-cha	"Wild Ones" — Flo Rida, feat. Sia

=== Week 2: Latin Night ===
Couples are listed in the order they performed.

Couple	Scores	Dance	Music	Result
Elizabeth & Val	25 (8, 9, 8)	Samba	"Straight to Memphis" — Club des Belugas	Safe
Christina & Mark	25 (9, 8, 8)	Paso doble	"Applause" — Lady Gaga	Safe
Bill E. & Emma	21 (7, 7, 7)	Jive	"Crocodile Rock" — Elton John	Safe
Jack & Cheryl	24 (8, 8, 8)	Rumba	"Mad World" — Tears for Fears	Safe
Keyshawn & Sharna	18 (6, 6, 6)	Samba	"Get Up Offa That Thing" — James Brown	Eliminated
Nicole & Sasha	20 (6, 7, 7)	Rumba	"Just Give Me a Reason" — P!nk, feat. Nate Ruess	Safe
Leah & Tony	24 (8, 8, 8)	Samba	"María" — Ricky Martin	Safe
Bill N. & Tyne	17 (6, 5, 6)	Paso doble	"Symphony No. 5" — Ludwig van Beethoven	Safe
Corbin & Karina	26 (9, 8, 9)	Jive	"Kiss You" — One Direction	Safe
Valerie & Tristan	19 (6, 6, 7)	Paso doble	"Don't Let Me Be Misunderstood" — Santa Esmeralda	Safe
Brant & Peta	23 (8, 7, 8)	Rumba	"Underneath Your Clothes" — Shakira	Safe
Amber & Derek	24 (8, 8, 8)	Jive	"Reet Petite" — Jackie Wilson	Safe

=== Week 3: Hollywood Night ===
Couples are listed in the order they performed.

Couple	Scores	Dance	Music	Film/Theme	Result
Leah & Tony	24 (8, 8, 8)	Rumba	"Skyfall" — Adele	Skyfall	Safe
Corbin & Karina	26 (9, 8, 9)	Quickstep	"Diga Diga Doo" — Duke Ellington	Old Hollywood	Safe
Elizabeth & Val	25 (8, 9, 8)	Foxtrot	"Come Fly with Me" — Frank Sinatra	Come Fly with Me	Safe
Brant & Peta	27 (9, 9, 9)	Quickstep	"Crazy in Love" — Emeli Sandé & The Bryan Ferry Orchestra	The Great Gatsby	Safe
Valerie & Tristan	16 (6, 5, 5)	Cha-cha-cha	"Grace Kelly" — Mika	Grace Kelly & Freddie Mercury	Safe
Bill E. & Emma	24 (8, 8, 8)	Paso doble	"William Tell Overture" — Gioachino Rossini	The Lone Ranger	Safe
Amber & Derek	24 (8, 8, 8)	Charleston	"Bang Bang" — will.i.am	The Great Gatsby	Safe
Jack & Cheryl	22 (7, 7, 8)	Cha-cha-cha	"Hollywood Swinging" — Kool & the Gang	Be Cool	Safe
Christina & Mark	26 (9, 8, 9)	Charleston	"Let Me Drown" — from The Wild Party	Vaudeville	Safe
Nicole & Sasha	25 (9, 8, 8)	Quickstep	"Sparkling Diamonds" — Nicole Kidman	Gentlemen Prefer Blondes	Safe
Bill N. & Tyne	16 (6, 5, 5)	Jazz	"Get Lucky" — Daft Punk, feat. Pharrell Williams	Tron: Legacy	Eliminated

=== Week 4 ===
Individual judges scores and votes in the charts below (given in parentheses) are listed from left to right: Carrie Ann Inaba, Julianne Hough, Bruno Tonioli.

Couples are listed in the order they performed.

Couple	Scores	Dance	Music	Result
Jack & Cheryl	24 (8, 8, 8)	Quickstep	"Man Like That" — Gin Wigmore	Safe
Elizabeth & Val	27 (9, 9, 9)	Argentine tango	"Symphony 6: Fair Thee Well & the Requiem Mix" — Emily Wells	Safe
Brant & Peta	21 (7, 7, 7)	Salsa	"Shake Señora" — Pitbull	Safe
Valerie & Tristan	18 (6, 6, 6)	Viennese waltz	"Carry On" — Fun.	Eliminated
Leah & Tony	24 (8, 8, 8)	Cha-cha-cha	"Papi" — Jennifer Lopez	Safe
Corbin & Karina	27 (9, 9, 9)	Paso doble	"Zorongo" 一 Paco Peña	Safe
Nicole & Sasha	24 (8, 8, 8)	Jive	"Mickey" 一 Toni Basil	Safe
Christina & Mark	24 (8, 8, 8)	Foxtrot	"Sexy Silk" — Jessie J	Safe
Amber & Derek	27 (9, 9, 9)	Tango	"Love Lockdown" — Kanye West	Safe
Bill E. & Emma	21 (7, 7, 7)	Samba	"Cuban Pete" — José Norman	Safe

=== Week 5: Most Memorable Year Night ===
Couples are listed in the order they performed.

Couple	Scores	Dance	Music	Result
Christina & Mark	28 (9, 10, 9)	Cha-cha-cha	"Forget You" — Cee Lo Green	Eliminated
Jack & Cheryl	27 (9, 9, 9)	Waltz	"Kissing You" — Des'ree	Safe
Leah & Tony	22 (7, 7, 8)	Contemporary	"Roar" — Katy Perry	Safe
Corbin & Karina	28 (9, 9, 10)	Foxtrot	"My Wish" — Rascal Flatts	Safe
Bill E. & Emma	24 (8, 8, 8)	Viennese waltz	"She's Always a Woman" — Billy Joel	Safe
Nicole & Sasha	27 (9, 9, 9)	Jazz	"Work Bitch" — Britney Spears	Safe
Brant & Peta	27 (9, 9, 9)	Contemporary	"Your Song" — Elton John	Safe
Amber & Derek	26 (9, 7, 10)	Foxtrot	"Try a Little Tenderness" — from Glee	Safe
Elizabeth & Val	26 (8, 9, 9)	Jive	"I'm So Excited" — The Pointer Sisters	Safe

=== Week 6: Switch-Up Challenge ===
Due to a technical error the previous week in which incorrect voting numbers were displayed for the couples, the votes were subsequently thrown out and no couple was eliminated. Instead, the judges' scores and viewer votes carried over to the following week.

In the Switch-Up Challenge, all eight couples were divided into two groups of four. In marathon-style, they all danced to four songs they had not previously rehearsed and were scored on their ability to interpret the music, transition from one song to another, and stay on time. Couples are listed in the order they performed.

Couple	Scores	Dance	Music
Bill E. & Emma	23 (8, 8, 7)	Tango	"Cheeseburger in Paradise" — Jimmy Buffett
Elizabeth & Val	30 (10, 10, 10)	Cha-cha-cha	"Put Your Hands on Me" — Joss Stone
Leah & Tony	27 (9, 9, 9)	Quickstep	"Man Wanted" — from Copacabana
Brant & Peta	28 (9, 10, 9)	Tango	"The Night Out" — Martin Solveig
Amber & Derek	28 (10, 8, 10)	Samba	"Get It Right" — Fantasia
Jack & Cheryl	25 (8, 9, 8)	Paso doble	"Conquest" — The White Stripes
Nicole & Sasha	27 (9, 9, 9)	Foxtrot	"Build Me Up Buttercup" — The Foundations
Corbin & Karina	23 (8, 7, 8)	Viennese waltz	"Game of Thrones Theme" — Ramin Djawadi
Bill E. & Emma	1	Megamix	"Hot in Herre" — Nelly, "In the Hall of the Mountain King" — Edvard Grieg, "Let's Get It On" — Marvin Gaye & "Doop" — Doop
Jack & Cheryl	2	Megamix	"Hot in Herre" — Nelly, "In the Hall of the Mountain King" — Edvard Grieg, "Let's Get It On" — Marvin Gaye & "Doop" — Doop
Nicole & Sasha	3	Megamix	"Hot in Herre" — Nelly, "In the Hall of the Mountain King" — Edvard Grieg, "Let's Get It On" — Marvin Gaye & "Doop" — Doop
Corbin & Karina	4	Megamix	"Hot in Herre" — Nelly, "In the Hall of the Mountain King" — Edvard Grieg, "Let's Get It On" — Marvin Gaye & "Doop" — Doop
Leah & Tony	1	Megamix	"Sexy and I Know It" — LMFAO, "The Blue Danube" — Johann Strauss II, "Chillando Goma" — Fulanito & "Shake a Tail Feather" — The Blues Brothers
Elizabeth & Val	2	Megamix	"Sexy and I Know It" — LMFAO, "The Blue Danube" — Johann Strauss II, "Chillando Goma" — Fulanito & "Shake a Tail Feather" — The Blues Brothers
Brant & Peta	3	Megamix	"Sexy and I Know It" — LMFAO, "The Blue Danube" — Johann Strauss II, "Chillando Goma" — Fulanito & "Shake a Tail Feather" — The Blues Brothers
Amber & Derek	4	Megamix	"Sexy and I Know It" — LMFAO, "The Blue Danube" — Johann Strauss II, "Chillando Goma" — Fulanito & "Shake a Tail Feather" — The Blues Brothers

=== Week 7: Team Dance Night ===
Each couple performed one unlearned dance and a Halloween-themed team freestyle. The teams were chosen by the highest scoring couples: Amber & Derek (Team "Foxing Awesome") and Elizabeth & Val (Team "Spooky BomBom"). Couples are listed in the order they performed.

Couple	Scores	Dance	Music	Result
Elizabeth & Val	27 (9, 9, 9)	Quickstep	"Dance Apocalyptic" — Janelle Monáe	Safe
Brant & Peta	27 (9, 9, 9)	Jive	"Tutti Frutti" — Little Richard	Safe
Leah & Tony	26 (9, 8, 9)	Salsa	"I Know You Want Me (Calle Ocho)" — Pitbull	Safe
Jack & Cheryl	27 (10, 8, 9)	Jive	"Going Up the Country" — Canned Heat	Safe
Amber & Derek	29 (10, 10, 9)	Paso doble	"Diablo Rojo" — Rodrigo y Gabriela	Safe
Bill E. & Emma	23 (8, 7, 8)	Quickstep	"Viva Las Vegas" — Elvis Presley	Safe
Nicole & Sasha	27 (9, 9, 9)	Samba	"Hey Mama" — Black Eyed Peas	Eliminated
Corbin & Karina	29 (10, 9, 10)	Cha-cha-cha	"Pumpin Blood" — NONONO	Safe
Bill E. & Emma Elizabeth & Val Leah & Tony Nicole & Sasha	27 (9, 9, 9)	Freestyle (Team "Spooky BomBom")	"Bom Bom" — Sam and the Womp	
Amber & Derek Brant & Peta Corbin & Karina Jack & Cheryl	30 (10, 10, 10)	Freestyle (Team "Foxing Awesome")	"The Fox (What Does the Fox Say?)" — Ylvis	

=== Week 8: Cher Night ===
Individual judges scores and votes in the charts below (given in parentheses) are listed from left to right: Carrie Ann Inaba, Cher, Bruno Tonioli.

All of the dance routines were performed to songs by Cher. In addition, after the individual routines were performed, the highest-scorers, Amber & Derek, received immunity and avoided elimination for this week. The remaining six couples competed in pairs in a dance-off challenge, with the winners receiving an additional three points that were added to their scores. Couples are listed in the order they performed.

Couple	Scores	Dance	Cher music	Result
Corbin & Karina	27 (9, 9, 9)	Argentine tango	"Welcome to Burlesque"	Safe
Leah & Tony	25 (8, 9, 8)	Viennese waltz	"I Got You Babe"	Safe
Brant & Peta	27 (9, 9, 9)	Foxtrot	"The Shoop Shoop Song (It's in His Kiss)"	Eliminated
Elizabeth & Val	25 (8, 9, 8)	Jazz	"Bang Bang (My Baby Shot Me Down)"	Safe
Bill E. & Emma	24 (8, 8, 8)	Disco	"Strong Enough"	Safe
Jack & Cheryl	27 (9, 9, 9)	Tango	"The Beat Goes On"	Safe
Amber & Derek	28 (9, 9, 10)	Rumba	"If I Could Turn Back Time"	Immunity

Dance-offs
Couple	Dance	Cher music	Result
Corbin & Karina	Cha-cha-cha	"Woman's World"	Winners
Elizabeth & Val	Cha-cha-cha	"Woman's World"	Losers
Leah & Tony	Rumba	"I Found Someone"	Winners
Brant & Peta	Rumba	"I Found Someone"	Losers
Jack & Cheryl	Disco	"Song for the Lonely"	Winners
Bill E. & Emma	Disco	"Song for the Lonely"	Losers

=== Week 9: Trio Night ===
Each couple performed one unlearned ballroom dance and one trio dance. Each couple chose one professional who was either previously eliminated or participated in the dance troupe. Couples are listed in the order they performed.

Couple	Trio partner	Scores	Dance	Music	Result
Amber & Derek	Mark Ballas	24 (8, 8, 8)	Quickstep	"That's It!" — Preservation Hall Jazz Band	Safe
Amber & Derek	Mark Ballas	27 (9, 9, 9)	Salsa	"Que Viva La Vida" — Wisin	Safe
Leah & Tony	Henry Byalikov	27 (9, 9, 9)	Tango	"Love Me Again" — John Newman	Safe
Leah & Tony	Henry Byalikov	27 (9, 9, 9)	Jive	"We're Not Gonna Take It" — Twisted Sister	Safe
Corbin & Karina	Witney Carson	28 (9, 9, 10)	Waltz	"Apologize" — OneRepublic	Safe
Corbin & Karina	Witney Carson	30 (10, 10, 10)	Jazz	"Yeah!" — Usher, feat. Lil' Jon & Ludacris	Safe
Jack & Cheryl	Sharna Burgess	29 (10, 10, 9)	Viennese waltz	"Let Me Go" — Avril Lavigne, featuring Chad Kroeger	Safe
Jack & Cheryl	Sharna Burgess	25 (8, 8, 9)	Samba	"I Wan'na Be Like You" — Big Bad Voodoo Daddy	Safe
Bill E. & Emma	Peta Murgatroyd	21 (7, 7, 7)	Charleston	"Yakety Yak" — The Coasters	Safe
Bill E. & Emma	Peta Murgatroyd	21 (7, 7, 7)	Salsa	"Candy" — Robbie Williams	Safe
Elizabeth & Val	Gleb Savchenko	26 (9, 8, 9)	Viennese waltz	"Young and Beautiful" — Lana Del Rey	Eliminated
Elizabeth & Val	Gleb Savchenko	30 (10, 10, 10)	Salsa	"Pucko" — Bonde do Rolê	Eliminated

=== Week 10: Plugged/Unplugged Night ===
Individual judges scores in the chart below (given in parentheses) are listed from left to right: Carrie Ann Inaba, Len Goodman, Maksim Chmerkovskiy, Bruno Tonioli.

The couples performed two different dance styles to the original version (plugged) and an acoustic version (unplugged) of the same song. Couples are listed in the order they performed.

The unplugged versions of Corbin & Karina's rumba and Amber & Derek's Viennese waltz were performed by Kerli. Noah Guthrie performed the unplugged version of Bill E. & Emma's Argentine tango.

Couple	Scores	Dance	Music	Result
Leah & Tony	32 (8, 8, 8, 8)	Paso doble	"Bad Romance" — Lady Gaga	Eliminated
Leah & Tony	33 (8, 8, 8, 9)	Argentine tango	"Bad Romance" — Lady Gaga	Eliminated
Corbin & Karina	35 (9, 8, 9, 9)	Tango	"My Songs Know What You Did in the Dark (Light Em Up)" — Fall Out Boy	Safe
Corbin & Karina	40 (10, 10, 10, 10)	Rumba	"My Songs Know What You Did in the Dark (Light Em Up)" — Fall Out Boy	Safe
Jack & Cheryl	33 (8, 8, 9, 8)	Jazz	"Roxanne" — The Police	Safe
Jack & Cheryl	38 (10, 9, 9, 10)	Argentine tango	"Roxanne" — The Police	Safe
Bill E. & Emma	28 (7, 7, 7, 7)	Cha-cha-cha	"Sexy and I Know It" — LMFAO	Safe
Bill E. & Emma	32 (8, 8, 8, 8)	Argentine tango	"Sexy and I Know It" — LMFAO	Safe
Amber & Derek	39 (10, 10, 9, 10)	Jazz	"Locked Out of Heaven" — Bruno Mars	Safe
Amber & Derek	40 (10, 10, 10, 10)	Viennese waltz	"Locked Out of Heaven" — Bruno Mars	Safe

=== Week 11: Finals ===
Each couple performed a dance chosen by one of the judges in hopes of improving their original scores, a samba relay, and a supersized freestyle. At the end of the night, one couple was eliminated. On the second night, the three couples performed a fusion dance of two previously learned dance styles. Couples are listed in the order they performed.

Night 1

Couple	Scores	Dance	Music	Result
Bill E. & Emma	24 (8, 8, 8)	Viennese waltz	"She's Always a Woman" — Billy Joel	Eliminated
Bill E. & Emma	25 (8, 9, 8)	Freestyle	"The Raiders March" — John Williams	Eliminated
Corbin & Karina	27 (9, 9, 9)	Quickstep	"Diga Diga Doo" — Duke Ellington	Safe
Corbin & Karina	30 (10, 10, 10)	Freestyle	"Smooth Criminal" — Michael Jackson	Safe
Jack & Cheryl	24 (8, 8, 8)	Jive	"Going Up the Country" — Canned Heat	Safe
Jack & Cheryl	30 (10, 10, 10)	Freestyle	"Top Hat, White Tie and Tails" — Fred Astaire	Safe
Amber & Derek	30 (10, 10, 10)	Charleston	"Bang Bang" — will.i.am	Safe
Amber & Derek	30 (10, 10, 10)	Freestyle	"Can You Do This" — Aloe Blacc	Safe
Bill E. & Emma	2	Samba; Relay	"No Scrubs" — TLC	
Jack & Cheryl	3	Samba; Relay	"No Scrubs" — TLC	
Amber & Derek	4	Samba; Relay	"No Scrubs" — TLC	
Corbin & Karina	5	Samba; Relay	"No Scrubs" — TLC	

Night 2

Couple	Scores	Dance	Music	Result
Corbin & Karina	27 (9, 9, 9)	Cha-cha-cha & Foxtrot	"All Night" — Icona Pop	Runners-up
Jack & Cheryl	27 (9, 9, 9)	Paso doble & Salsa	"Sexy People (The Fiat Song)" — Arianna, feat. Pitbull	Third place
Amber & Derek	30 (10, 10, 10)	Quickstep & Samba	"(Your Love Keeps Lifting Me) Higher and Higher" — Jackie Wilson	Winners

== Dance chart ==
The couples performed the following each week:

- Week 1: One unlearned dance (cha-cha-cha, contemporary, or foxtrot)
- Week 2: One unlearned dance
- Week 3: One unlearned dance
- Week 4: One unlearned dance
- Week 5: One unlearned dance
- Week 6: One unlearned dance & switch-up dance
- Week 7: One unlearned dance & team dance
- Week 8: One unlearned dance & dance-offs
- Week 9: One unlearned dance & trio dance
- Week 10: Two unlearned dances
- Week 11 (Finals, Night 1): Judge's choice, samba relay & freestyle
- Week 11 (Finals, Night 2): Fusion dance

Dancing with the Stars (season 17) - Dance chart
Couple	Week																		
Couple	1	2	3	4	5	6		7		8		9		10		11			
Couple	1	2	3	4	5	6		7		8		9		10		Night 1			Night 2
Amber & Derek	Cha-cha-cha	Jive	Charleston	Tango	Foxtrot	Samba	Megamix	Paso doble	Team Freestyle	Rumba	Immunity	Quickstep	Salsa	Jazz	Viennese waltz	Charleston	Samba; Relay	Freestyle	Quickstep & Samba
Corbin & Karina	Contemp.	Jive	Quickstep	Paso doble	Foxtrot	Viennese waltz	Megamix	Cha-cha-cha	Team Freestyle	Argentine tango	Cha-cha-cha	Waltz	Jazz	Tango	Rumba	Quickstep	Samba; Relay	Freestyle	Cha-cha-cha & Foxtrot
Jack & Cheryl	Foxtrot	Rumba	Cha-cha-cha	Quickstep	Waltz	Paso doble	Megamix	Jive	Team Freestyle	Tango	Disco	Viennese waltz	Samba	Jazz	Argentine tango	Jive	Samba; Relay	Freestyle	Paso doble & Salsa
Bill E. & Emma	Foxtrot	Jive	Paso doble	Samba	Viennese waltz	Tango	Megamix	Quickstep	Team Freestyle	Disco	Disco	Charleston	Salsa	Cha-cha-cha	Argentine tango	Viennese waltz	Samba; Relay	Freestyle	
Leah & Tony	Foxtrot	Samba	Rumba	Cha-cha-cha	Contemp.	Quickstep	Megamix	Salsa	Team Freestyle	Viennese waltz	Rumba	Tango	Jive	Paso doble	Argentine tango				
Elizabeth & Val	Contemp.	Samba	Foxtrot	Argentine tango	Jive	Cha-cha-cha	Megamix	Quickstep	Team Freestyle	Jazz	Cha-cha-cha	Viennese waltz	Salsa						
Brant & Peta	Cha-cha-cha	Rumba	Quickstep	Salsa	Contemp.	Tango	Megamix	Jive	Team Freestyle	Foxtrot	Rumba								
Nicole & Sasha	Cha-cha-cha	Rumba	Quickstep	Jive	Jazz	Foxtrot	Megamix	Samba	Team Freestyle										
Christina & Mark	Contemp.	Paso doble	Charleston	Foxtrot	Cha-cha-cha														
Valerie & Tristan	Foxtrot	Paso doble	Cha-cha-cha	Viennese waltz															
Bill N. & Tyne	Cha-cha-cha	Paso doble	Jazz																
Keyshawn & Sharna	Cha-cha-cha	Samba																	
