= Sexy Lady (Jessie J song) =

Song by Jessie J

from the album Alive
- Studio: The Mothership (Los Angeles, California); Conway (Hollywood, California); Sarm West (London, UK)
- Genre: Dance-pop; pop rock
- Length: 3:12
- Label: Lava; Republic
- Songwriters: Jessica Cornish; Joshua Coleman; Claude Kelly
- Producer: Ammo

"Sexy Lady" is a song by English singer-songwriter Jessie J from her second studio album, Alive (2013). Appearing on as the fourth song on the album's track listing, "Sexy Lady" was written by Jessie and long-term collaborator Claude Kelly. American record producer Joshua "Ammo" Coleman wrote and produced the music for the song, whilst additional production came from O.C. and Kevin Figs; Jessie's vocals on the song were produced by Kelly.

Though never officially released as a single, following its use in advertisements for No. 7 by Boots, the song charted on the UK Singles Chart at number twenty-two off the back of digital downloads of the album track. Music critics compared the song heavily to previous hits, particularly "Domino", and were divided over whether it was cheap copy of previous songs or not; however, most critics called the song empowering.

== Promotion ==
Jessie J performed the song on episode 7 of the sixteenth series of wish-granting television show Surprise Surprise. The song was also used as the theme for TV adverts by Boots, for its advertising campaign promoting its No. 7 cosmetics range.

== Critical reception ==
"Sexy Lady" was met with a mixed critical reception; critics were divided, both positively and negatively comparing it heavily to previous hit single "Domino" (2011) whilst others called the song empowering. In her review of the album for Allmusic, Heather Phares compared the song to Jessie's previous 2011 hit single "Domino", which she also compared to songs akin to P!nk and Natasha Bedingfield. Digital Spy's Lewis Corner, also compared the two songs, but concluded that "Sexy Lady" was a "tired knockoff of 'Domino'." Phil Mongredien from The Observer, said that "Sexy Lady" (along with "Excuse My Rude") was "perfectly palatable" but not as arresting as "Price Tag" or "Do It Like a Dude". His colleague from sister-publication The Guardian disagreed, calling it "empowering platitudes", whilst a writer for Metro also agreed that the song was empowering, saying "[it] supports the notion that if you holler and stomp loudly enough, it’s really empowering." Natalie Palmer of Entertainmentwise, felt that "Sexy Lady" and "It's My Party" were too similar, calling them "hard to distinguish", though she did admit that they were "[b]oth good pop songs".

== Credits ==
Recording

- Music recorded at the Mothership, Los Angeles.
- Vocals recorded at Sarm West in London and Conway Studios in Hollywood.
- mixed and mastered at MixStar Studios in Virginia Beach, Virginia.

Personnel

- Matt Buckley – guitar
- Joshua "Ammo" Coleman – production, songwriting, programming, keyboards, guitars
- Jessica "Jessie J" Cornish – lead vocals, songwriter
- Kevin Figgs – additional production, programming, keyboards
- Serban Ghenea – mixing
- Mark "Exit" Goodchild – vocal engineering
- John Hanes – mixing
- Claude Kelly – songwriting, vocal production,
- O.C. – additional production, programming, keyboards
- Kevin Reeves – audio mastering
- Sahaj Ticotin – guitar solo

== Chart performance ==
On the week ending 28 September 2013, "Sexy Lady" debuted at number twenty-two on the UK Singles Chart. "Sexy Lady" spent a total of six weeks in the top 100. In Ireland, the song debuted at number thirty on the Irish Singles Chart on 26 September 2013.

Chart (2013–2014)	Peak position
Ireland (IRMA)	30
Scottish Singles Sales (Official Charts)	15
UK Singles (Official Charts)	22

== Certifications ==
Region	Certification	Certified units/sales
United Kingdom (BPI)	Silver	200,000^{‡}
^{‡} Sales+streaming figures based on certification alone.
