= Video interlude =

A video interlude is an interlude during a performance that shows a video. Video interludes are often played in concerts, showing a music video (often made specifically for the show), usually featuring the artists while the artist takes a break or costume change.

Video interludes have been used by Madonna since at least 1990.
