= Alive (Jessie J album) =

Studio album by Jessie J
- Released: 23 September 2013
- Recorded: June 2012 – June 2013
- Studios: KMA Studios (New York, NY); Sarm Studios (London); Roc the Mic Studios (New York, NY); Conway Recording Studios (Los Angeles, CA); The Mothership (Hollywood, CA); Luke's in the Boo (Malibu, CA); NRG Recording Studios (North Hollywood, CA); Milkboy the Studios (Philadelphia, PA); Pulse Studios (Burbank, CA); Miami Lights Studios (Miami, FL); 4220 Feng Shui Studios (Hollywood, CA); Belly of the Beast (London); Jungle City Studios (New York, NY)
- Genres: Pop; R&B
- Length: 46:07
- Labels: Lava; Universal Republic
- Producers: Josh Abraham; All About She; Ammo; Benny Blanco; Johnny BLK; Cirkut; Dr. Luke; Kevin Figs; Chuck Harmony; Rodney Jerkins; Jon Jon; Claude Kelly; O.C.; Oligee; StarGate; STL; The ThundaCatz; TMS

Jessie J chronology
| Who You Are (2011) | Alive (2013) | Sweet Talker (2014) |

Singles from Alive
- 1. "Wild" Released: 26 May 2013; 2. "It's My Party" Released: 6 September 2013; 3. "Thunder" Released: 26 November 2013

Alive is the second studio album by English singer-songwriter Jessie J. It was released on 23 September 2013 through Lava Music and Universal Republic. American rap artist Becky G, singer Brandy, American hip-hop artist Big Sean and British grime artist Dizzee Rascal all make guest appearances on the album. Jessie co-wrote the album with Claude Kelly, amongst a host of collaborators from both new and old.

Upon release, the album was met with a mixed reception of music critics. While there was praise for Jessie's vocals, some felt that the album was too generic. Musically, Alive is a pop and R&B record that features influences from dance-pop, pop rock, soul and hip hop in its production.

The album debuted and peaked at number three on the UK Albums Chart. It spawned two top-five hits including "Wild" and "It's My Party", as well as a top-twenty single, "Thunder". Jessie supported Alive with the Alive Tour, playing 19 dates across the UK, from October to November 2013.

== Background ==
"Alive" was recorded over a twelve-month period between June 2012 and May 2013 in London, New York City and Los Angeles. The title derives from the song "Alive" on the album. Writing partners on the album include Australian singer-songwriter Sia and writer Diane Warren. Jessie J tweeted her excitement, saying she was "living the dream". Throughout the year, Jessie J made several announcements suggesting that she was recording her second album, including saying: "For the seven years before I signed my record deal, I was in a bad place, and I was scared that I couldn't get out of it. That's why I wrote such upbeat music, as a way of trying to escape how I felt. Now that I am happier, I won't be afraid to explore my pain. But in a good way; it'll be me saying that it's OK not to feel OK." According to Jessie, all of the songs on the album were co-written with American songwriter Claude Kelly, the only song she didn't write was a song that was produced by Scottish DJ Calvin Harris, which was written by American writer Ester Dean. It was later confirmed that she decided to leave the song off the album as "it didn't feel like her".

In June 2013, rumours surfaced online stating Jessie J's new album would be called Gold after she announced to Capital FM that the album's title would be one word, and it had the letter "O" in it. However, she quickly extinguished these statements in an interview with Digital Spy, saying: "You will see the title and you’ll see the picture and you'll see the album cover and I think it's summed up in one word, in one picture." Jessie announced the title and release date of Alive during a live performance at V Festival on 17 August 2013. In an interview with Laura Whitmore backstage at the festival, she talked about the album, saying it was written in five weeks and had a more mature sound. When asked about her choice for the album title, she said, "It really represents where I'm at in my life right now and how I feel about my life."

== Promotion and release ==
"Square One" was performed acoustically on a Google hangout with her fans. 1 August 2013 saw the premiere of "It's My Party" through a second Google hangout, with Jessie playing an acoustic preview to her fans with simple guitar riff playing. "Excuse My Rude" premiered as a promotional single on 12 August 2013, via an official YouTube audio stream. "Square One" was released as a promotional single on 30 August 2013, via iTunes. "Sexy Lady" was used by highstreet retailer Boots to promote its No.7 brand, during a TV ad campaign in September 2013. After a fake track list circulated the internet and was noticed by Jessie herself, she was forced to reveal the back cover art of the album and the official track list via Twitter and Instagram.

On 14 September 2013, Jessie J announced that the American version of the album would be pushed back because her American label "didn't feel the album would work on their territory". She was to record new material for it, which was rumoured to be produced by Pharrell Williams. In an interview, she said she planned on moving to the United States the following year in an effort to break into the country's market. In an interview, Jessie said she expected the American version of the album to be released in 2014. This idea was later scrapped for unknown reasons and she began work on a brand new album, 2014's Sweet Talker, worldwide.

== Singles ==
The album's first single, "Wild", was released on 26 May 2013. The single, which was written by Jessie J and Claude Kelly, features Big Sean and Dizzee Rascal, and peaked at number five on the UK Singles Chart. The song also charted at 9 on the Irish Singles Chart. The music video was directed by Emil Nava and debuted on 25 May 2013.

The second single from the album, "It's My Party", was released on 15 September 2013. It premiered on Capital FM on 5 August 2013. The music video, directed by Emil Nava, was filmed in late June and released on 8 August 2013.

On 17 October 2013, Jessie J announced the release of the album's third and final single "Thunder", along with its single cover. The song was released on 26 November 2013. The official music video premiered on VEVO on 19 November 2013.

== Critical reception ==
Professional ratings
Aggregate scores
| Source | Rating |
|---|---|
| Metacritic | 57/100 |
Review scores
| Source | Rating |
| AllMusic | 3/5 stars |
| Digital Spy | 4/5 stars |
| The Financial Times | 3/5 stars |
| London Evening Standard | 4/5 stars |
| Gigwise | (mixed) |
| The Guardian | 3/5 stars |
| Metro | 3/5 stars |
| PopMatters | 6/10 |
| Virgin Media | 3/5 stars |

Upon its release, Alive received generally mixed reviews from critics. Some critics widely complimented Jessie J's vocals and self-confidence, while others dismissed the album as "generic" and "overwrought". Gigwise rated the album six stars out of ten and wrote: "The second studio album by Jessie J certainly showcases her singing talent, but while Alive is a mix of good tracks and powerful lyrics – a lot which is too similar to what's been before, or even what is plainly out at the moment". Virgin Media also gave the album a mixed review, saying that "Jessie J has overcome the hurdles of being a moderate singer, bogstandard songwriter and not having an original musical idea in her head to become a bona fide A-list pop star", adding that she "has risen to the occasion and then some. Alive is a better album than its predecessor, with marginally fewer banal four-to-the-floor beats and more chance for Jessie's personality-plus charisma to shine."

London Evening Standard was more positive and gave the album 4 out of 5 stars. The newspaper declared Jessie a "very English response to Katy Perry" and summed Alive as "thumping, very 21st-century pop [...] It's short on heart but there's genuine craft here, plus star quality and a puppy-like need to be liked." Digital Spy also reviewed the album positively, writing that "Alive as a whole is an accomplished pop record by an undeniably talented singer-songwriter that results in a natural progression from her debut – and one that can hopefully win some of those 'haters' over", adding that "There's no escaping the fact that Alive does have a tendency to switch genre throughout its course, but the overall thinking does feel much more cohesive than her debut." Heather Phares of AllMusic rated the album three out of five stars. She found that with Alive, Jessie was exploring "nearly as many sounds on her second album as she did on her debut". She felt that album's "simplest and most direct moments, like "Wild"'s dance-pop and "Conquer the World," a heartfelt duet with Brandy, are among its best." Phil Mongredien, writing for The Guardian, wrote that "it's by no means a bad record, although the ballads are best avoided."

== Commercial performance ==
Alive debuted and peaked at number three on the UK Albums Chart, selling 39,270 copies in its first week of release. The album slipped to number seven selling 14,574 copies the following week. Altogether, Alive spent a total of 12 weeks inside the top 40 of the chart, and by November 2013 had been certified gold by the British Phonographic Industry (BPI) for shipments of 100,000 units. It has sold over 179,000 copies in the United Kingdom as of 2014.

Across Europe, Alive was a moderate success managing to chart inside the top 40 in most countries. In Switzerland, the album debuted at number fifteen, considerably higher than that of her previous album Who You Are which debuted at number twenty-nine. In Austria, the album debuted at number thirty-six, whereas, debuting at number nineteen in Spain and the Netherlands. In France, however, Alive debuted outside the top 100 at number 104. In Oceania the album had some success; in New Zealand, Alive debuted at number eighteen, whereas, in Australia, the album debuted inside the top 10 at number seven before falling to number twenty-eight the following week. Alive failed to chart on the US Billboard 200 when it was released in August 2015 on digital platforms and streaming.

== Track listing ==
Alive — Standard edition
| No. | Title | Writer(s) | Producer(s) | Length |
|---|---|---|---|---|
| 1. | "It's My Party" | Jessica Cornish; Claude Kelly; John Larderi; Colin Norman | Kelly; Johnny BLK; Colino Fresh^{[A]} | 3:39 |
| 2. | "Thunder" | Cornish; Tor E. Hermansen; Mikkel S. Eriksen; Benjamin Levin; Kelly | Stargate; Benny Blanco | 3:35 |
| 3. | "Square One" | Cornish; Tom Barnes; Peter Kelleher; Ben Kohn | TMS | 3:46 |
| 4. | "Sexy Lady" | Cornish; Joshua Coleman; Kelly | Ammo; O.C.^{[A]}; Kevin Figs^{[A]} | 3:13 |
| 5. | "Harder We Fall" | Cornish; Lukasz Gottwald; Ammar Malik; Daniel Omelio; Henry Walter | Dr. Luke; Cirkut | 3:57 |
| 6. | "Breathe" | Cornish; Sia Furler; Eriksen; Hermansen | Stargate | 3:57 |
| 7. | "I Miss Her" | Cornish; Kelly; Charles T. Harmony | Chuck Harmony; Kelly | 3:58 |
| 8. | "Daydreamin'" | Cornish; Kelly; Josh Abraham; Oliver Goldstein | Abraham; Oligee | 2:47 |
| 9. | "Excuse My Rude" (featuring Becky G) | Cornish; Rebbeca Marie Gomez; Gottwald; Niles Hollow-Dhar; Malik; Walter | Dr. Luke; Cirkut | 3:07 |
| 10. | "Wild" (featuring Big Sean & Dizzee Rascal) | Cornish; Coleman; Kelly; Sean Anderson; Dylan Mills | Ammo | 3:54 |
| 11. | "Gold" | Cornish; Gottwald; Kelly; Walter | Cirkut | 3:24 |
| 12. | "Conquer the World" (featuring Brandy) | Cornish; Kelly; John Webb, Jr.; Anders Froen; Jamil DeBardlabon; Are Sorkness | Kelly; Jon Jon | 3:26 |
| 13. | "Alive" | Cornish; Kelly; Rodney "Darkchild" Jerkins | Darkchild | 3:24 |
| Total length: | | | | 46:07 |

Alive Deluxe edition (bonus tracks)
| No. | Title | Writer(s) | Producer(s) | Length |
|---|---|---|---|---|
| 14. | "Unite" | Cornish; Furler; Eriksen; Hermansen | Stargate | 3:51 |
| 15. | "Hero" | Cornish; Lorne Alistair Tennant; Camille Purcell; Marwan El Bergamy; M.Moore | The ThundaCatz | 3:19 |
| 16. | "Magnetic" | Cornish; Richard "Fazer" Rawson; Peter "Neros" Ibsen; Tennant | STL | 3:54 |
| 17. | "It's My Party" (All About She UKG Remix) | Cornish; Kelly; Larderi; Norman | Kelly; Johnny BLK; Colino Fresh^{[A]}; All About She^{[B]} | 3:44 |
| Total length: | | | | 60:55 |

Notes

- All vocals were produced by Claude Kelly except deluxe edition bonus track "Magnetic", where vocals were produced by Lorne Alistair Tennant and STL.
- ^{^[A]} indicates additional production.
- ^{^[B]} indicates remix production.

== Charts ==
=== Weekly charts ===
| Chart (2013) | Peak position |
|---|---|
| Australian Albums (ARIA) | 7 |
| Austrian Albums (Ö3 Austria) | 36 |
| Belgian Albums (Ultratop Flanders) | 26 |
| Belgian Albums (Ultratop Wallonia) | 34 |
| Chinese Albums (Sino Chart) | 21 |
| Dutch Albums (Album Top 100) | 19 |
| French Albums (SNEP) | 104 |
| German Albums (Offizielle Top 100) | 35 |
| Irish Albums (IRMA) | 6 |
| New Zealand Albums (RMNZ) | 18 |
| Scottish Albums (Official Charts) | 2 |
| Spanish Albums (Promusicae) | 19 |
| Swiss Albums (Schweizer Hitparade) | 15 |
| UK Albums (Official Charts) | 3 |

== Certifications ==
| Region | Certification | Certified units/sales |
|---|---|---|
| United Kingdom (BPI) | Gold | 193,000 |
