= Thunder (Jessie J song) =

Jessie J song

Single by Jessie J

from the album Alive
- Released: 26 November 2013
- Studio: KMA Studios (New York, NY); Roc the Mic Studios (New York, NY); Sarm Studios (London)
- Genre: Synth-pop
- Length: 3:35
- Label: Lava; Universal Island
- Songwriters: Jessica Cornish; Claude Kelly; Tor Erik Hermansen; Benjamin Levin; Mikkel Storleer Eriksen
- Producers: StarGate; Benny Blanco

Jessie J singles chronology
"It's My Party" (2013)	"Thunder" (2013)	"Calling All Hearts" (2014)

Music video
- "Thunder" on YouTube

"Thunder" is a song by English singer-songwriter Jessie J, from her second studio album Alive (2013). It was written by Jessie J, Claude Kelly, Benjamin Levin, Tor Erik Hermansen and Mikkel Storleer Eriksen, while production was helmed by StarGate and Benny Blanco. It was released on 26 November 2013 as the third and final single from the album.

== Background ==
"Thunder" was written by Jessie J, Mikkel S. Eriksen, Tor Erik Hermansen, Claude Kelly and Benny Blanco. It was produced by Eriksen and Hermansen, credited under their production name StarGate, along with Blanco. Jessie's vocals were recorded by Chris Sclafani, Joel Peters, and Justin Pancionendon, with Mark "Exit" Goodchild serving as its engineer. Kelly provided additional vocals on the song. "Thunder" was mixed by Phil Tan and assistants Daniela Rivera and Phil Seaford. Eriksen and Hermansen recorded the song's instrumentation, and Tim Blacksmith and Danny D. were assigned as its executive producers. Andrew "McMuffin" Luftman and Scott "Yarmov" Yarmovsky were credited as production coordinators on the song.

The song was the last song Jessie and Kelly penned for the Alive album. "It got sent over by Stargate and Benny Blanco, and Claude and myself were like, 'Thunder, thunder, thunder'", Jessie later elaborated, "we just started writing and had it finished in about half an hour before I went to the airport to fly home from New York." Lyrically, "Thunder" was inspired by Jessie J's religious beliefs. "Thunder is a dedication to God," she told British newspaper The Mirror. "I remember I prayed a lot when I worked on this album and it's not something I've ever spoken about openly," she shared. "I've very much enjoyed bringing my beliefs onto the album. I think it's important that whatever your beliefs are you use them in your day-to-day life."

== Reception ==
On 18 October 2013, Jessie J announced that "Thunder" was chosen for release as the third single from Alive and also debuted the single's art work on her Instagram page alongside the caption: "My next UK single is…". It officially impacted European contemporary and rhythmic radio stations on 26 November 2013. On 6 December, the single was released digitally and as a CD single, which contained the album version of the song and producer Erik Arbores's remix of the song. Following its release, "Thunder" first appeared in the top 40 of the UK Singles Chart at number 40. One week later, it climbed nine places to 31, then another thirteen places to number 18 the week after.

== Music video ==
The accompanying music video was directed by Emil Nava. As her Christian faith took on an important role in the development of both Alive and "Thunder", it was significantly incorporated into the production of the video. "That's why in the video I'm levitating, that feeling of being lifted to the light," Jessie told The Mirror. The clip sees her demonstrate some more classic dance moves. In it, she is shown with a short blond cropped hairstyle and wears a skin-toned bodysuit with strategically placed black embroidery and a slinky black cape. She also channels a more gothic look, with dark eye makeup and dark red lipstick. Jessie levitates, dances in the sand and in front of a car as lights flash around her.

== Track listing ==
- Digital EP
1. "Thunder" (Full Crate Remix) – 4:38
2. "Thunder" (Erik Arbores Remix) – 5:12
3. "Thunder" (Erik Arbores Dub) – 5:12
4. "Thunder" (Instrumental) – 3:34

== Credits and personnel ==
Credits adapted from the liner notes of Alive.

- Production coordination – Andrew "McMuffin" Luftman, Scott "Yarmov" Yarmovsky
- Executive production – Danny D, Tim Blacksmith
- Additional vocals – Claude Kelly
- Vocal production – Claude Kelly
- Programming – Benny Blanco, StarGate
- Mixing – Phil Tan
- Mixing assistance – Daniela Rivera
- Engineering – Mark "Exit" Goodchild, Phil Seaford
- Recording – Chris Sclafani, Joel Peters, Justin Pancione
- Mastering – Kevin Reeves

== Charts ==
Chart (2013)	Peak Position
Australia (ARIA)	100
Ireland (IRMA)	55
Scotland Singles (OCC)	16
UK Singles (OCC)	18

== Release history ==
Region	Date	Label	Format
United Kingdom	8 December 2013	Digital download	Universal Island
