= Jessie J =

English singer-songwriter (born 1988)

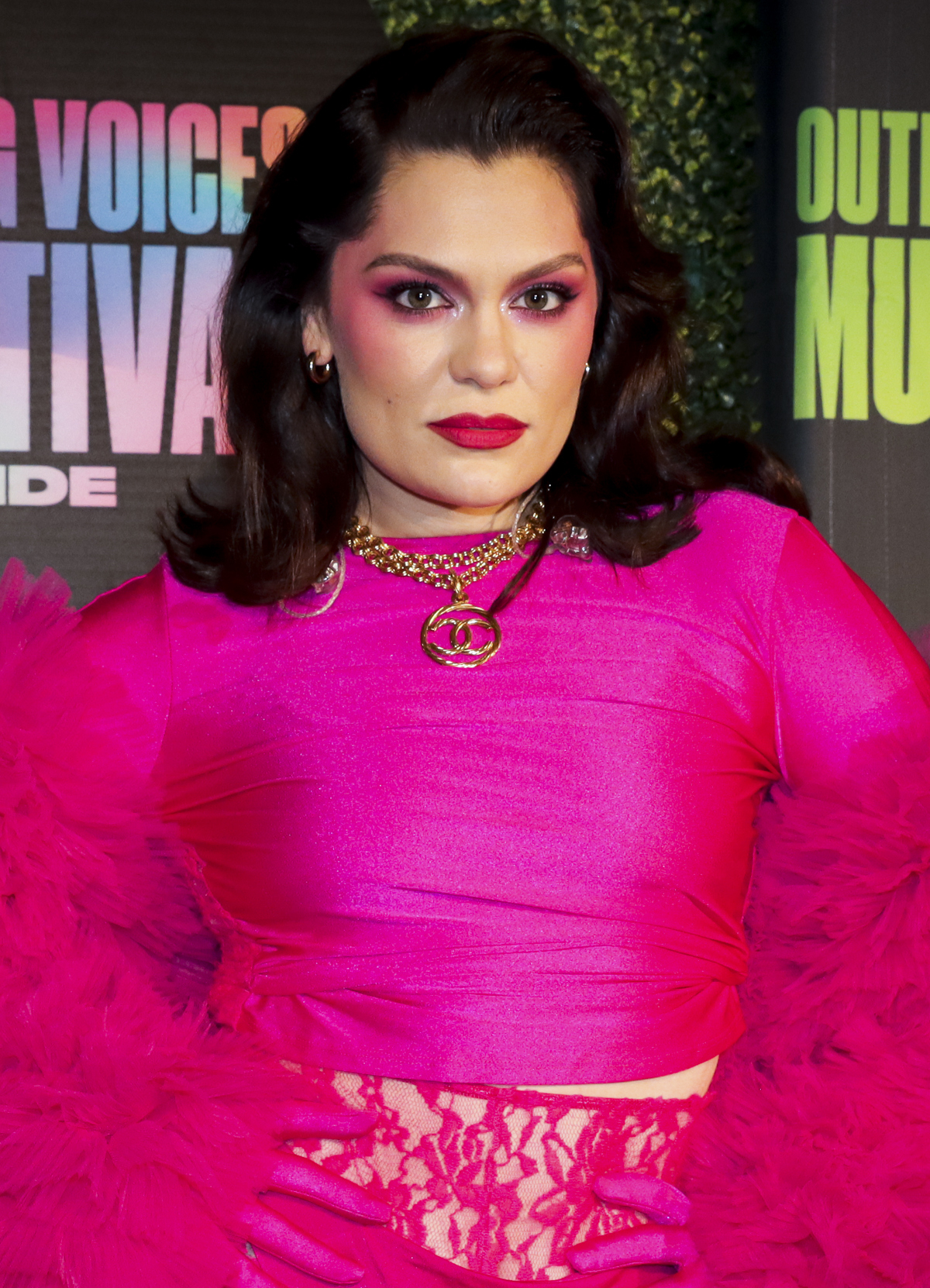
- Jessie J in 2022
- Born: Jessica Ellen Cornish; 27 March 1988 (age 38); Chadwell Heath, London, England
- Occupations: Singer; songwriter
- Years active: 1999–present
- Works: Discography; songs recorded; concert tours
- Partners: Chanan Colman (2021–2026)
- Children: 1
- Awards: Full list
- Musical career
- Genres: Pop; R&B
- Instrument: Vocals
- Labels: Lava; Republic; Island; Gut
- Website: jessiejofficial.com

Signature
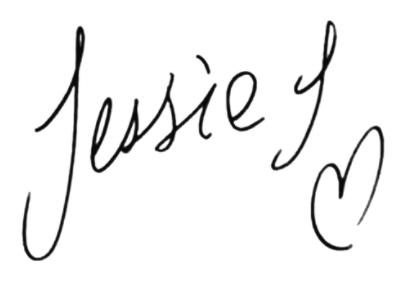

Jessica Ellen Cornish (born 27 March 1988), known professionally as Jessie J, is an English singer and songwriter. After signing with Republic Records, Jessie J came to prominence with the release of her debut single, "Do It like a Dude", which peaked at number two on the UK Singles Chart. Her following single, "Price Tag", was an international success, topping the charts in nineteen countries, including the UK. It was followed by the release of her debut album, Who You Are (2011), which peaked at number two in the UK. Other singles from the album included "Nobody's Perfect", "Who You Are", "Domino" and "Laserlight", all of which peaked within the top ten in the UK, making Jessie J the first British female artist to have six top-ten singles from a sole studio album.

Jessie J's second album, Alive (2013), peaked within the top five on the UK Albums Chart and included the singles "Wild" and "It's My Party". The release of her third album, Sweet Talker (2014), was preceded by the single "Bang Bang" which debuted at number one in the UK and went multi-platinum worldwide. The album made the top five in the UK and peaked at number 10 on the US Billboard 200, her highest-charting album in the US. As of January 2015, Jessie J had sold over 20 million singles and three million albums worldwide. In 2018, she released her four-part fourth album, R.O.S.E., followed by her Christmas album, This Christmas Day.

Citing various influences, Jessie J is recognised for an unconventional musical and performance style that mixes soul vocals with contemporary R&B, electropop, and hip-hop beats. She has received various accolades, including the 2011 Critics' Choice Brit Award and the BBC's Sound of 2011. Jessie J has supported various charitable causes, and has appeared on the UK charity telethons BBC Children in Need and Comic Relief. She has served as a coach on the television singing competition shows The Voice UK (2012–2013), The Voice Australia (2015–2016) and The Voice Kids UK (2019). In 2018, Jessie J won the sixth season of Singer, a Hunan TV competition show for professional singers.

== Early life ==
Jessica Ellen Cornish was born on 27 March 1988 in Chadwell Heath in the London Borough of Redbridge, London, to Rose (née Archer) and Stephen Cornish. She was educated at Mayfield High School in LB Redbridge. This area was part of Essex until 1965 and Jessie J refers to herself as an Essex girl. She attended Colin's Performing Arts School and as an 11-year-old she was cast in Andrew Lloyd Webber's West End production of Whistle Down the Wind. She subsequently joined the National Youth Music Theatre and appeared in their 2002 production of The Late Sleepers.

Cornish has two elder sisters, who were both head girls at school. Unlike her academic sisters, Cornish has stated she was "never really that good at anything". She said, "At school they were like 'oh, you're a Cornish girl' and they kind of expected me to be the same as my sisters. Give me something to draw or an outfit to pick for someone, or hair, make-up, acting, write a song, I'm fine with it, but anything to do with sums – it was never my thing." She also said she never based her intelligence on her exam results. She also said she was always good at singing and it was her "thing". In 2003, at age 15, she won Best Pop Singer in the TV show Britain's Brilliant Prodigies, performing as Jessica Cornish. At the age of 16 she began studying at the BRIT School and at 17 she joined a girl group named Soul Deep. She graduated in the class of 2006 along with singers Adele and Leona Lewis. She suffered a 'minor stroke at 18.' This was attributed to the heart condition Wolff–Parkinson–White syndrome, which she was diagnosed with aged 11.

== Career ==
=== 2006–2010: Career beginnings ===
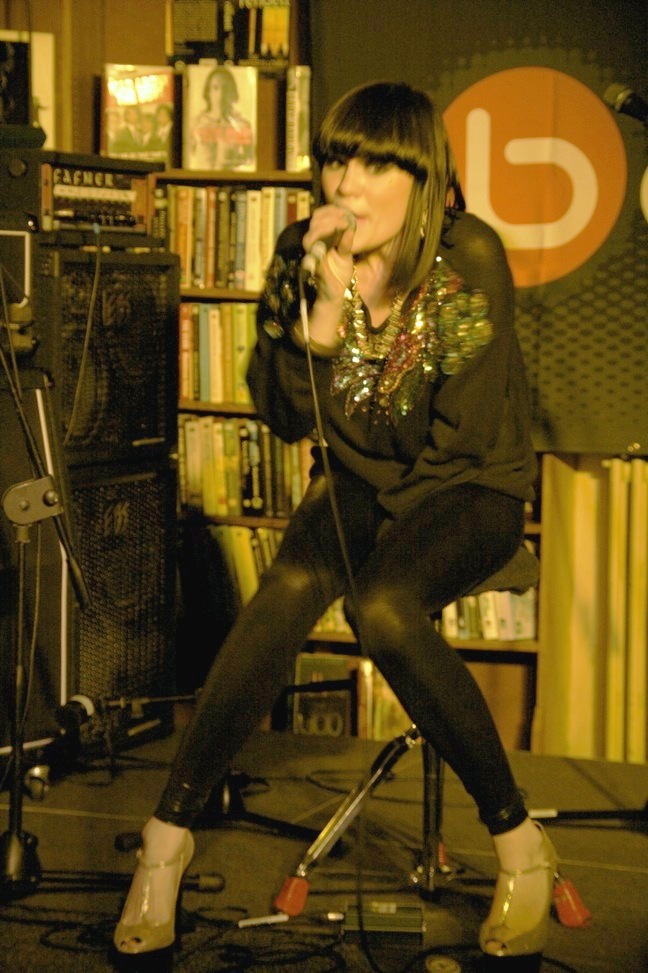
Jessie J performing in 2008 before fame

Jessie J was signed to Gut Records, recording an album for the label, but the company went bankrupt before any material was released. She then found success as a songwriter, gaining a Sony ATV publishing contract. She was also the support act for Cyndi Lauper during Lauper's UK dates of her 2008 Bring Ya to the Brink tour (Lauper invited J to join her on stage for the performances of "Girls Just Want to Have Fun"). Jessie has also written lyrics for artists such as Chris Brown and Miley Cyrus, including "Party in the U.S.A.". Jessie J was also part of a girl band, called Soul Deep, for two years, however, believing "it wasn't going anywhere", she left the group. Despite people thinking that her first notoriety was through YouTube, Jessie was signed for four years before her first video was posted. Jessie first came to the attention of Lava Records when her publisher at Sony/ATV, Rich Christina, sent Lava president Jason Flom a link to her MySpace page, which the record executive loved. After seeing an impressive US showcase, Lava, along with several other labels, was keen to sign the artist but progress was hampered by her management's insistence on, what Flom called, a "crazy deal", and their refusal to let Jessie speak to any labels directly. Despite this, Senior Director of A&R at Lava, Harinder Rana, made surreptitious efforts to meet Jessie on her own in winter of 2008. Later in the year a change in management to Sarah Stennett and Nadia Khan of Crown Music allowed record deal negotiations to take place. Jessie eventually signed with Lava as part of a joint venture with Universal Republic.

=== 2010–2012: Who You Are ===
Jessie J began recording her debut studio album in 2005 and it was completed on 19 January 2011. She revealed that "Big White Room" would be on the album and was written from an experience she had when she was aged 11, although she wrote the song at age 17, in the hospital, where a ward mate, a little boy, died. Jessie J says the album's title track, "Who You Are", is one of her proudest creations, she said the song is a "positive role model for young people" and "I always say that I'm half-artist, half-therapist". The song was written in 2005, when she just moved to Los Angeles, and was going through a very lonely difficult moment. A song called "Sexy Silk", which appears on the Easy A soundtrack, was originally going to be her first single. However, in late 2010 Jessie J released her first single, "Do It Like a Dude" which was co-written with George Astasio, Tj Normandin, Jason Pebworth, Jon Shave, Kyle Abrahams and Peter Ighile. Originally, she wrote the song with Rihanna in mind because "Rude Boy" was released at the time, partly inspiring the song. She then sent the song to her label, Island Records, before sending it to Rihanna's management. Island insisted the song become Jessie J's first single. The single gained positive reception from critics. The single charted at number two on the UK Singles Chart. Her follow-up single "Price Tag" was released in late January 2011. It was written by Jessie J, Dr. Luke, Claude Kelly, and B.o.B and peaked at number one on the UK Singles Chart. "Price Tag" was released in the US on 1 February 2011 and peaked at 23 on the Billboard Hot 100. "Price Tag" also charted at number-one in New Zealand and Ireland and is the most successful online video J has released. Her first American television appearance was as the musical guest on NBC's Saturday Night Live on 12 March 2011.

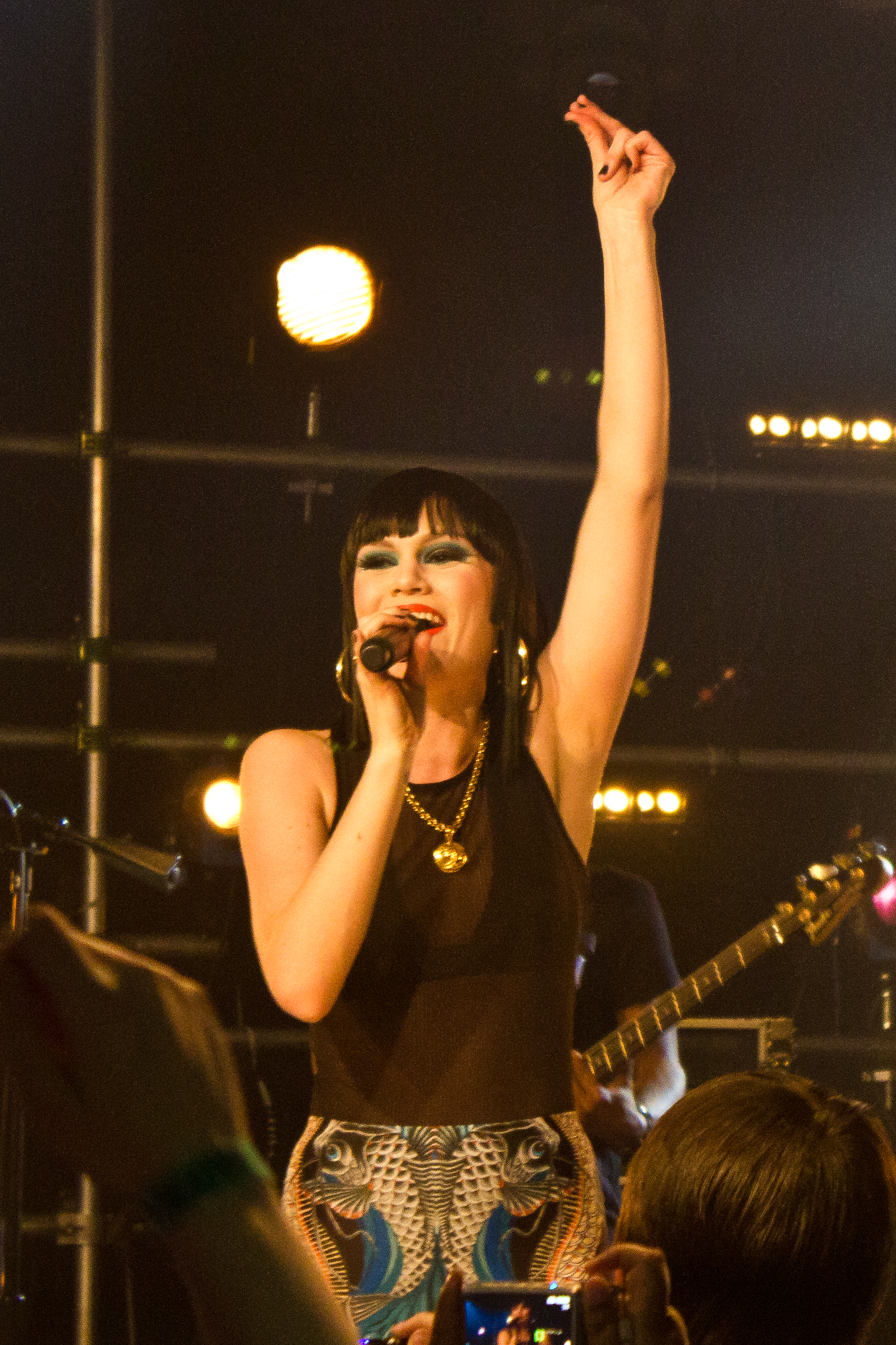
Jessie J performing at a concert in New York City in 2011

On 25 February 2011 her debut album, Who You Are, was released. The album first entered the UK Albums Chart on 6 March 2011 where it charted at number two. The album charted into the top ten in a number of countries and number 11 in the US. After the release she went on to release a third single from the album, "Nobody's Perfect". MTV reported that the single is, so far, only confirmed for release in the United Kingdom. The album's fourth single was "Who's Laughing Now". "Domino" was her second US single. The Dr. Luke-produced track was sent to mainstream radio on 6 September 2011. With the success of Who You Are in North America, Jessie was chosen to tour as the opening act for American pop artist Katy Perry's California Dreams Tour in 2011 but pulled out after breaking her foot in rehearsals. Jessie J served as the house artist at the 2011 MTV Video Music Awards, performing several of her original songs along with covers around commercial breaks.

On 12 June 2011, at the Summertime Ball held at Wembley Stadium, London, Jessie ruptured several tendons in her foot during rehearsals, and performed her set the following day while sitting on a gilded throne. For her appearance at Glastonbury Festival 2011 on 25 June 2011, she performed on the throne again, stating that her doctor had told her not to perform with her broken foot which would take six weeks to heal. Jessie J was scheduled to play at several festivals throughout the summer, however it was reported on 1 July 2011 that she would not be able to attend T in the Park, T4 on the Beach, Wembley:Orange, iTunes Festival, Lovebox, and Oxegen due to the injuries to her foot. Her record label released an official statement on 30 June 2011 that under strict orders from her doctor, she would not be able to perform for a number of weeks so that she could recuperate properly. She returned to the concert circuit in late August, including sets at the V Festival and The Big Chill. At the 2011 MTV VMA's she was still in a cast and using the throne.

James Morrison's third studio album, The Awakening features a collaboration with Jessie J called "Up", the song was released as a single on 16 November 2011. Jessie J re-released Who You Are on 9 November 2011, featuring the regular tracks plus "Domino". "Domino" topped the UK charts and became her first top 10 hit in the US, following the success of "Price Tag". While in Australia for the Oceania leg of her Heartbeat tour in support of Who You Are, an interview on a TV talk show ended with her being sawed in half by magician Sam Powers in his thin model sawing illusion. At the 2012 Brit Awards on 21 February, Jessie J received two Brit Award nominations, Best British Female Artist, and Best British Single ("Price Tag").

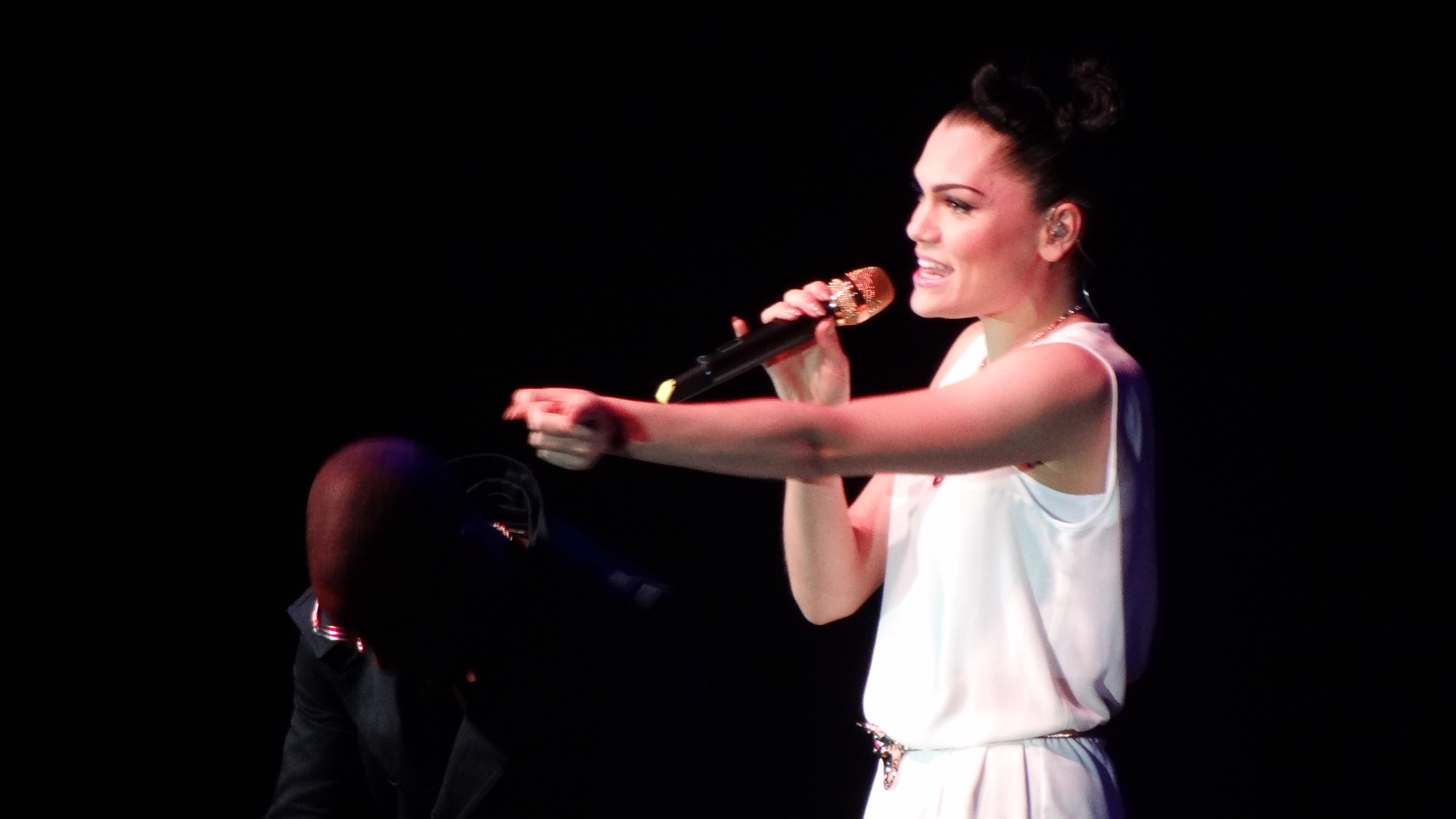
Jessie J performing at The Sony Awards in 2012

With featured artist, David Guetta, Jessie J released the sixth single, "Laserlight", from her debut album on 4 May 2012. In the United Kingdom, the song debuted at number 26 on the UK Singles Chart on the chart issue dated 21 April 2012. The following week the song climbed twenty-one positions to number five, making it her sixth top ten single from one album. With the charting success, she became the first UK female solo artist to achieve six top-ten singles from a single studio album. The achievement was compared with Lady Gaga, Katy Perry, Michael Jackson and boy band Take That, recording artists who previously broke the same record.

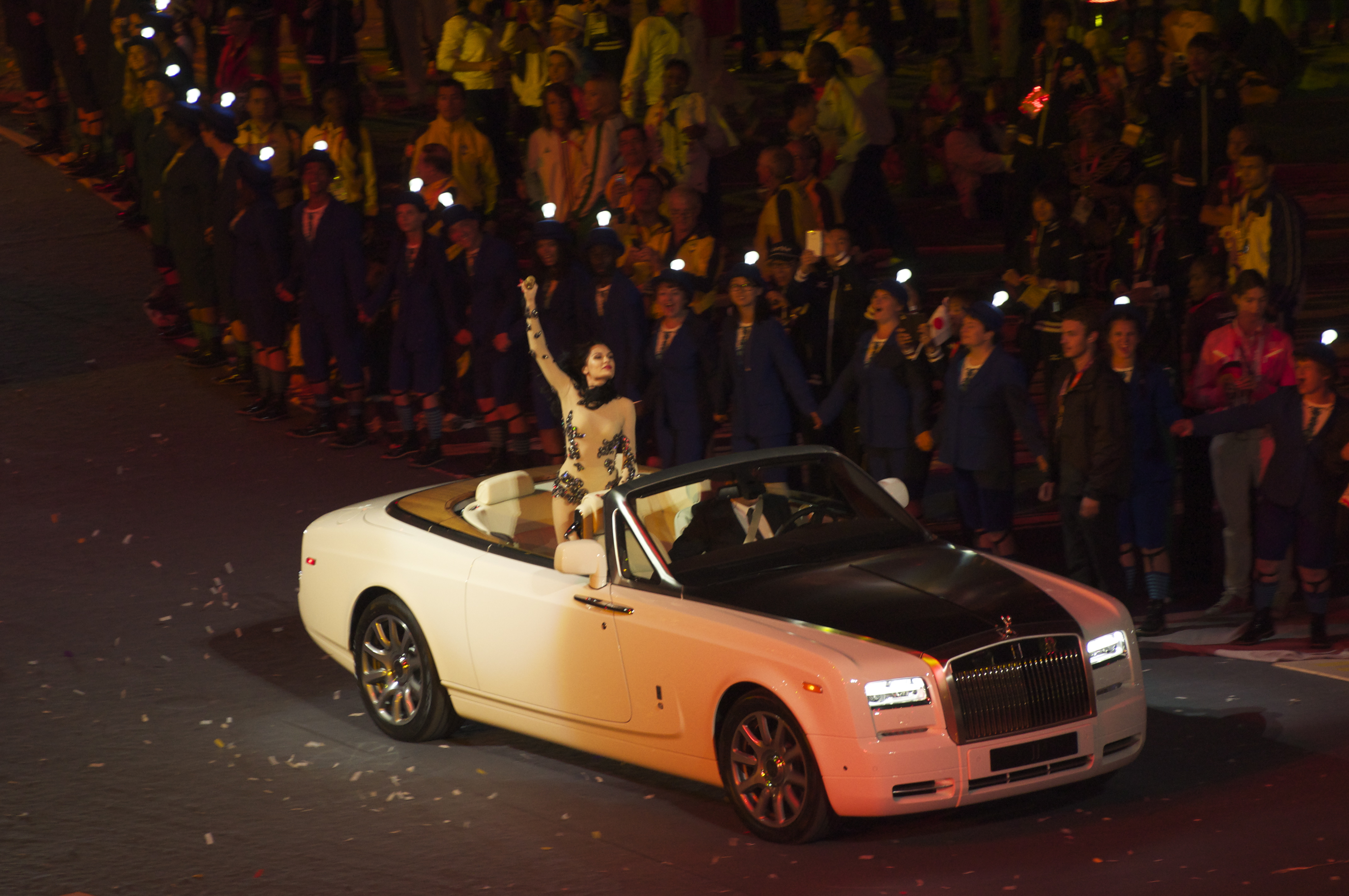
Jessie J performing at the 2012 London Olympics Closing Ceremony

On 4 June 2012, Jessie appeared at the Diamond Jubilee Concert for Queen Elizabeth II, performing a duet with will.i.am. Together, they performed "I Gotta Feeling", a song she previously recorded with the other four coaches of the televised singing competition, The Voice. She later sang her international hit, "Domino". On 12 August 2012 she performed "Price Tag", "Written in the Stars", "Dynamite", and "You Should Be Dancing" with Tinie Tempah and Taio Cruz, and "We Will Rock You" with Queen at the Closing Ceremony of the 2012 Olympic Games in London. Jessie J was a coach on the BBC One programme The Voice UK for its first two series in 2012 and 2013.

=== 2012–2016: Alive and Sweet Talker ===
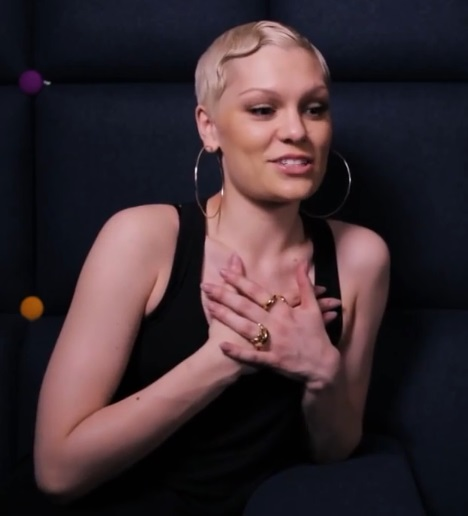
Jessie J at the O_{2} Arena in London in 2013

On 31 January 2012, Jessie J announced that she had begun recording her second studio album. She also stated that she hoped to collaborate with many artists that year, possibly including some of her fellow coaches on The Voice. It was revealed that she worked in the studio with CeeLo Green after he contacted her on Twitter. Jessie has also revealed on Twitter that she worked with Diane Warren and co-author of her song "Price Tag", Claude Kelly.

Via Twitter, Jessie J announced her first arena tour, called Nice to Meet You Tour (later renamed Alive Tour due to the release of her second studio album titled Alive), which began on 15 October 2013 and concluded on 8 February 2014. "Wild" was released as the lead single from Alive and was a top 5 hit in both the United Kingdom and Australia. Other singles released from the album included "It's My Party" and "Thunder". Jessie also featured on DJ Cassidy's debut single "Calling All Hearts", along with Canadian singer Robin Thicke.

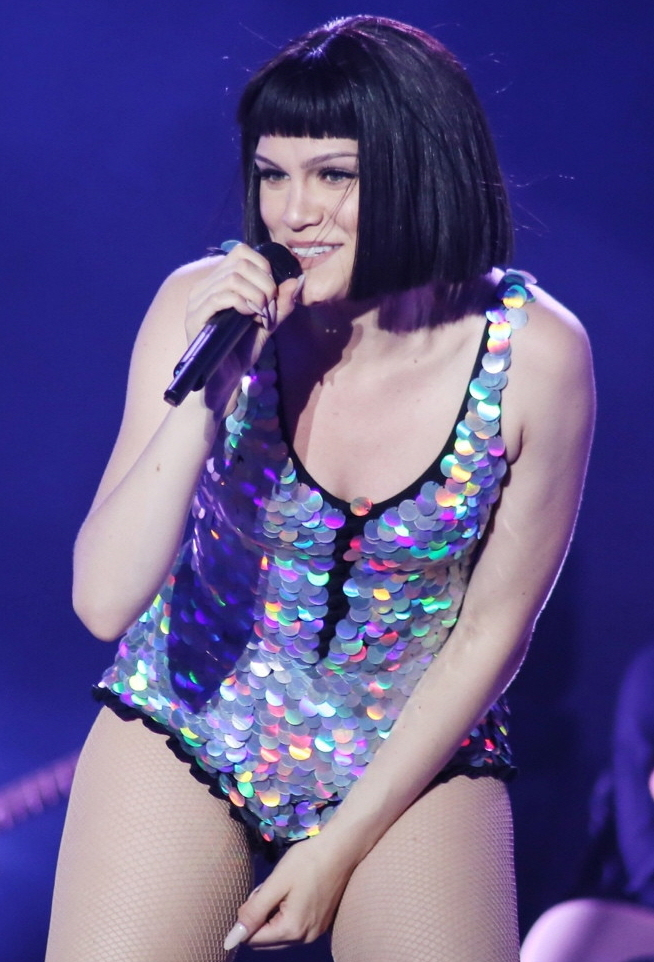
Jessie J in 2016

Her third studio album Sweet Talker was released on 13 October 2014 in the UK, where it peaked at number five. "Bang Bang" recorded with Ariana Grande and Nicki Minaj serves as the first single from the album. The song reached number one on the UK Singles Chart, becoming her third number one and seventh top five single in the UK. "Bang Bang" debuted on the US Billboard Hot 100 at number six, making it the second highest new entry of 2014 on the chart. The song became Jessie J's second top 10 single in the US, after her previous single "Domino", and eventually peaked at number three. In 2015, she became the judge and mentor of The Voice Australia replacing will.i.am. In the nominations for the 2016 Brit Awards, Jessie J's 2015 single "Flashlight" (from the soundtrack to the film Pitch Perfect 2) was among the nominees for Best British Video. In January 2015 she began the Sweet Talker Tour to promote the album.

In 2016, Jessie J joined the cast of voices for Ice Age: Collision Course singing the movie's theme song "My Superstar" (written by Alexander Geringas and Nikki Leonti) featuring Tha Vill. The song was eventually not released as a single and was not included in the soundtrack.

=== 2017–2020: R.O.S.E. and Singer 2018 ===
On 11 August 2017, Jessie J released a new single, "Real Deal", for M&M's advertising campaign. On 12 September, she announced her fourth album R.O.S.E. and the single "Think About That", which was released on 15 September 2017 as the album's lead single. Four further songs from R.O.S.E. were then released, with "Think About That" representing realization. "Not My Ex", was released as its second single on 6 October 2017 and represents obsession and the third single "Queen" was released on 17 November 2017, representing sex. In October 2017, Jessie J began her R.O.S.E. tour across Europe and the US to promote the upcoming album.

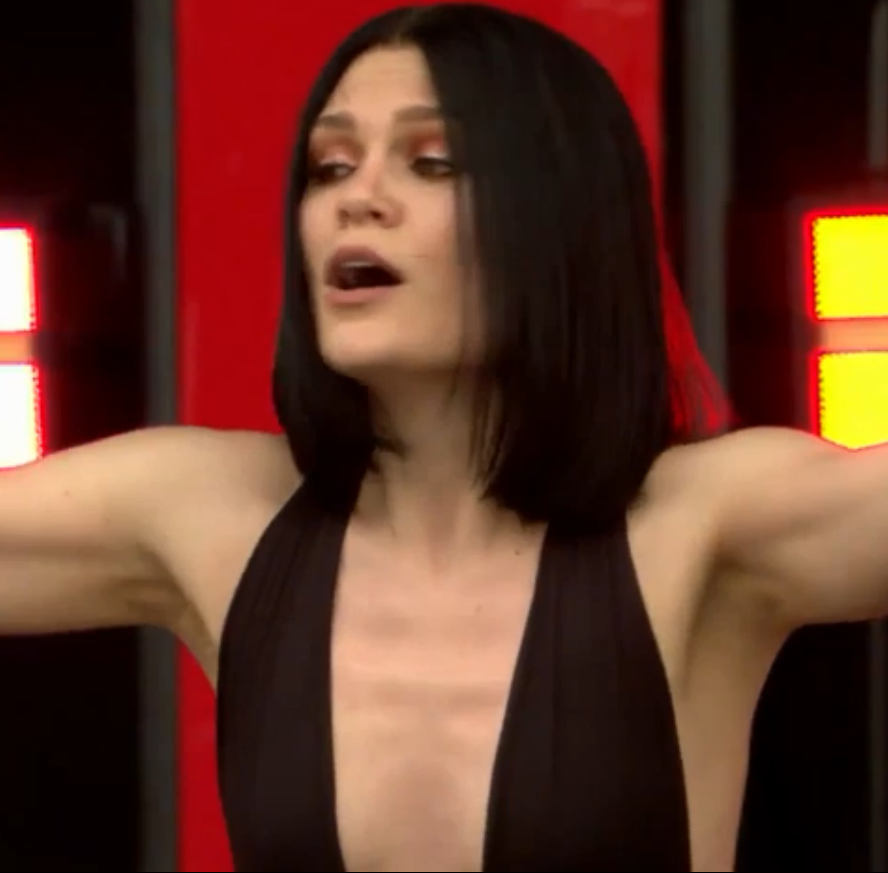
Jessie J performing in 2018

In January 2018, she appeared on the sixth season of I Am a Singer, a Chinese singing competition show for professional singers. Jessie J won the competition, making history as the first international singer to win the season in the show's six-year history, accompanied by the record of having topped number-one performances in five out of the first ten (of eleven) elimination rounds. The series cast also included two of the six other initial singers (singers entering on the first week of the competition with the exemption of participating Breakout rounds) Angela Chang and Wang Feng, and also her closest rival and runner-up for the season, Hua Chenyu, who would later go on to win the eighth season held two years later.

In May 2018, her fourth studio album R.O.S.E. was released. The album was released as four EPs titled Realisations, Obsessions, Sex, and Empowerment, creating an acronym for "R.O.S.E." The album moved away from the pop sound heard in much of her past music, instead taking on an R&B style. In September 2018, Jessie J announced her first Christmas album titled This Christmas Day, which was released on 26 October 2018. In December 2018, Jessie J confirmed that she would be appearing as a coach on The Voice Kids UK alongside Pixie Lott, Danny Jones and will.i.am for its third series. She also stated in an Instagram Live that she wants to write new pop/soul songs. In April 2019 Jessie began touring festivals across Europe and Asia. She announced via Instagram that the tour is called The Lasty Tour, in honour of her close friend and bodyguard Dave Last "Lasty" who died in December 2018.

=== 2019–present: Don't Tease Me with a Good Time ===
In Jessie J co-wrote "One More Try" with Max Martin and Oscar Holter, released in 2019. The track is the only original song to appear in Martin's 2019 jukebox musical & Juliet, where it is sung by Miriam-Teak Lee and Jordan Luke Gage as Juliet and Romeo on the official soundtrack. Jessie J's own version of the song is also included on the soundtrack.

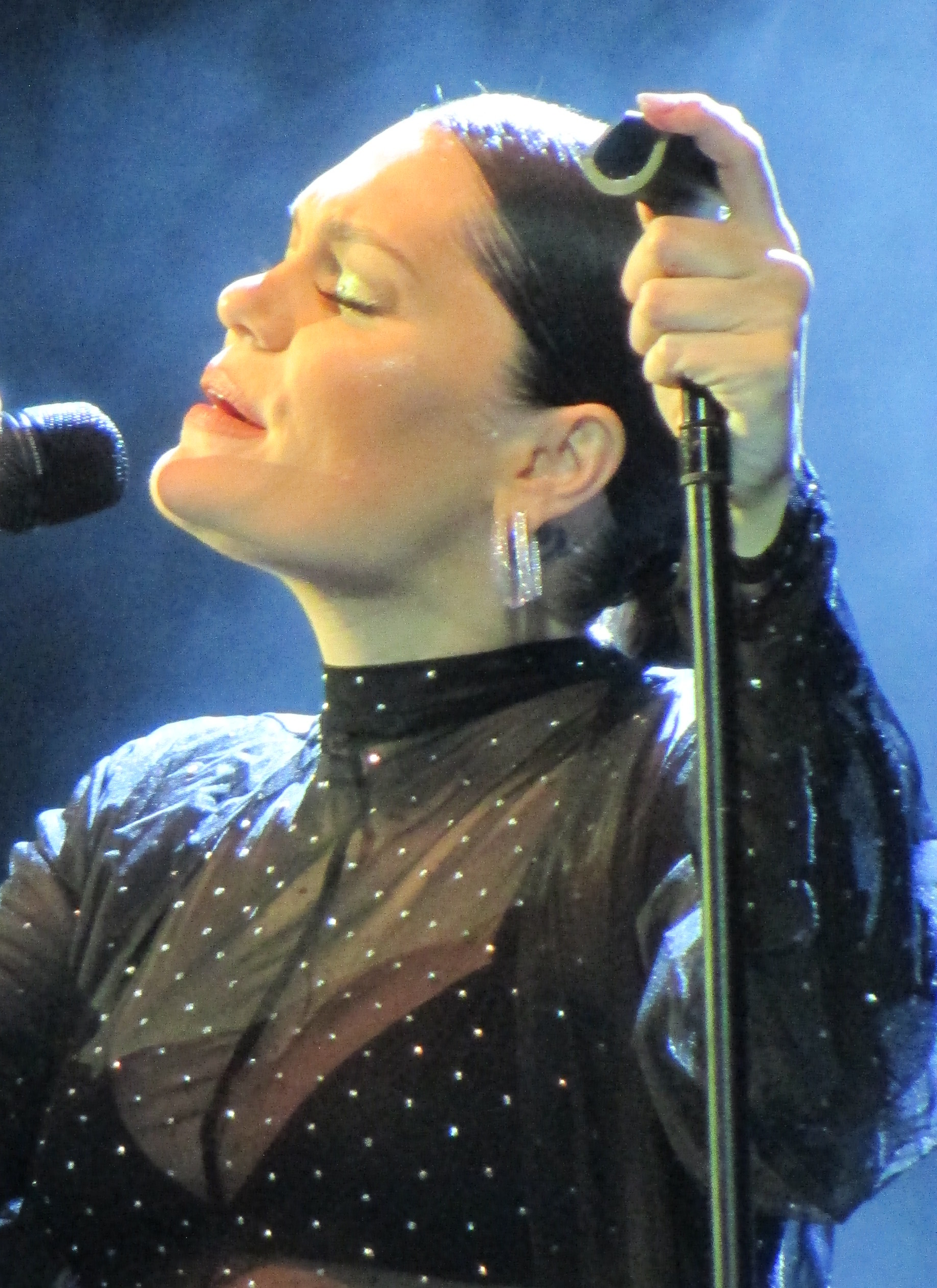
Jessie J performing in 2023

She then began working on a new music project, with original songs and a new album, which led in June 2021 to the release of her new single "I Want Love" from the new project. With new music videos and singles in the works, as she revealed in 2025 when "Living my best life" was released, in the same month Jessie J revealed receiving a diagnosis of Ménière's disease and an unrelated miscarriage. All new music was postponed or withdrawn from release. During an interview on Steven Bartlett's podcast Diary of a CEO on 2 May 2022, Jessie J revealed that her sixth album was recorded but she had decided to scrap it entirely after deciding that it "did not feel right". She also revealed that her label was supportive of the decision and supported her to start re-recording the album in April 2022. In terms of previously recorded music, Jessie J elaborated that some of the songs could be re-recorded, scrapped or allocated elsewhere but she was not sure if they would appear on the album. Jessie J also revealed that she had parted ways with her sixth manager, sensing that she needed a new internal team.

Later in September 2023, she revealed that she had departed Republic Records after 17 years. In a post on her Instagram Jessie J said that there was no animosity, and that "I have to just be honest with who I am and what I want from my career now and how I feel – and being signed just doesn't sit with that now", confirming she is not signed to a major label anymore.

In April 2025, Jessie J released "No Secrets", inspired by her loss and trauma, followed later by "Living My Best Life", the latter coming from her original album in 2021 and previewed with a live version during some gigs in 2022 and 2023. In June 2025, she revealed having breast cancer, while at the same time she announced she would keep on promoting new music with live performances and interviews, such as Summertime Ball 2025 and Rock in Rio. On 17 September 2025, she announced her sixth studio album Don't Tease Me with a Good Time, to be released on 28 November.

== Artistry and voice ==
Although Jessie J was first identified as a soul singer, she primarily records songs of R&B and pop music with hip hop influences. Music critic Matthew Perpetua of Pitchfork Media compared her to her peers Adele and Amy Winehouse, but suggested she was missing something: "Whereas Adele and Winehouse also have powerhouse voices, they fit into clear aesthetic niches and invest their songs with depth and humanity. Jessie J doesn't have even a fraction of their restraint." Perpetua added: "Her idea of showcasing her gift is to shoot for a blaring melisma on "Mamma Knows Best" that makes Christina Aguilera seem as subtle as Joni Mitchell by comparison."

Ailbhe Malone of the music magazine NME also recognised Cornish's "undeniably potent voice". However, she pointed out the possible "identity crisis" that might have been caused by Jessie's songwriter past: "This is an album of singles for other artists. There's Rihanna Jessie ('Do It...'), Perry Jessie ('Abracadabra'), Pixie Jessie ('Mamma Knows Best'), Ellie Jessie ('Big White Room')". Caroline Sullivan of The Guardian shared her positive opinion about the singer, saying that "if any singer has the potential to be the British Katy Perry or Pink, with the accompanying millions of sales, it's her". Sullivan also complimented Cornish's attitude: "[Her songs] are delivered with a confidence that money can't buy." Jessie J. has been compared to Perry, and has expressed admiration for Perry's music and her work ethic. She said, "Her hard work, her dedication, and how she deals with having the world stare at her every move, personally and professionally, with such dignity and strength, is inspiring."

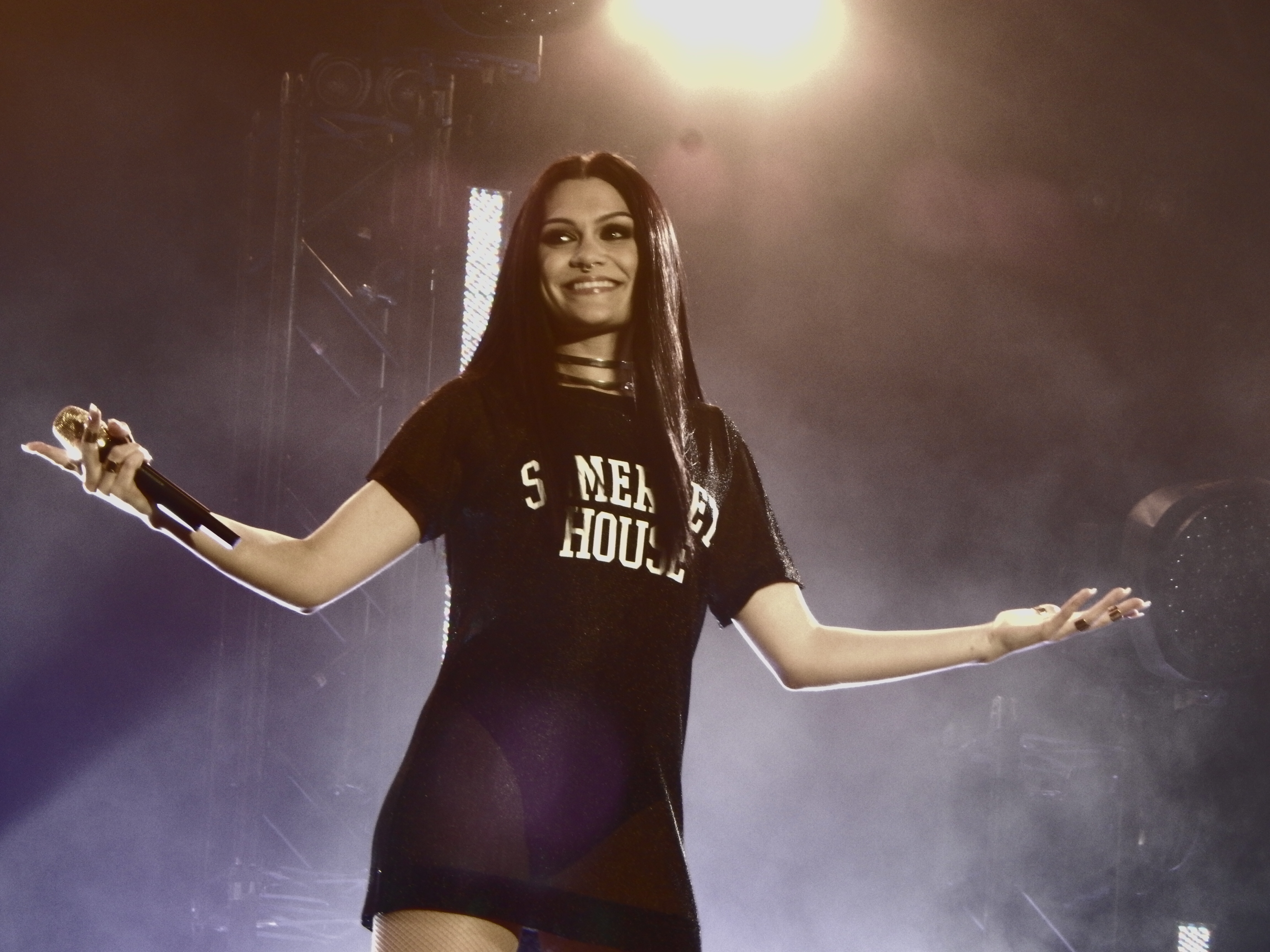
Jessie J performing in 2015

Entertainment Weekly's music critic Adam Markovitz said of Jessie: "The 23-year-old Brit has all the tools, from a monster voice to an ear for hooks—she co-wrote Miley Cyrus' 'Party in the U.S.A.'—and a manic persona that's equal parts Katy Perry, Kristin Chenoweth, and Alice Cooper."

Jessie J calls her fans "heartbeats", after her Heartbeat Tour. Of them, she has said, "They're amazing, and they're the only reason I'm here at the VMAs and people know who I am ... They support me and buy my albums and singles, and they stand outside hotels, and they come to shows, and they get tattoos of my lyrics and they cut their hair like me. You have to love your fans. That's why I call them my Heartbeats, because without them I wouldn't be here."

== Personal life ==
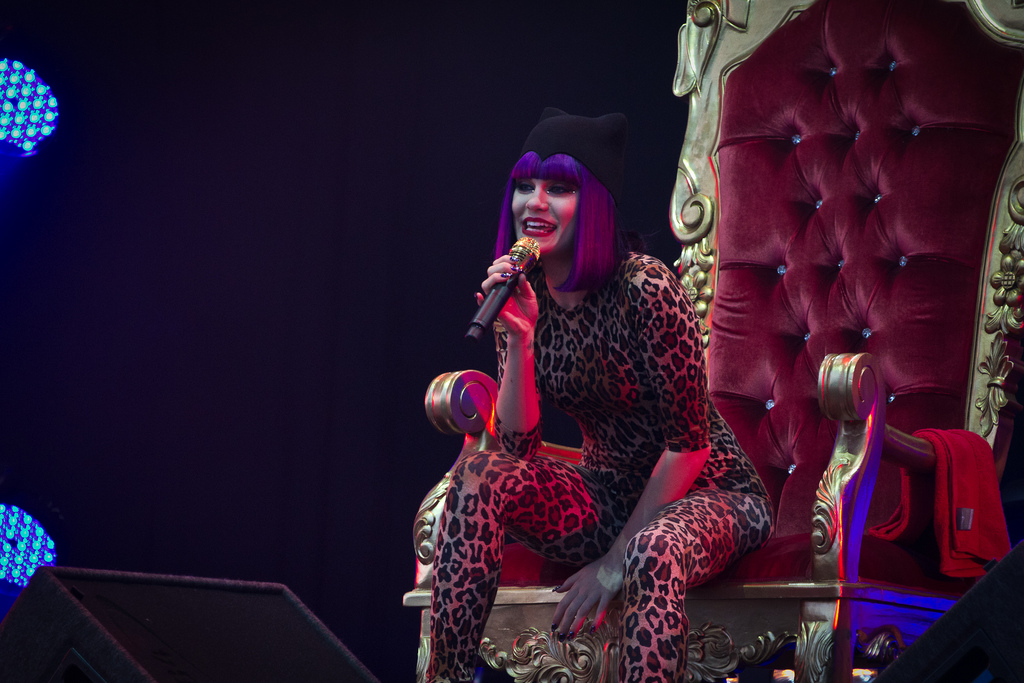
Jessie J performing at the 2011 The Big Chill, sitting on the "gilded throne" she used for performances while her foot was broken.

=== Sexuality and feminism ===
When asked about her bisexuality in an interview on the "In Demand" radio show on 3 March 2011, Jessie J stated, "I've never denied it. Whoopie doo guys, yes, I've dated girls and I've dated boys – get over it." Sophie Wilkinson of The Guardian argued that Jessie J's sexuality was valuable to young teens, especially for young girls unsure of themselves because of their sexuality and identity, to feel "that this does happen and this is normal". In April 2014, Jessie J renounced her bisexuality, stating, "For me, it was a phase. But I'm not saying bisexuality is a phase for everybody." Laura Kay of The Guardian said although she would never deny anyone the right to define their own sexuality, Jessie J renouncing her bisexuality "feels like such a loss for young gay or questioning people who look up to her", and wondered if the wrong message might have been sent because phase is "an unhelpful term as this is an idea that gay people find themselves constantly battling against". In a 2025 interview, she publicly apologized to her ex-partner for her "clumsy" phrasing, stating that she always will be attracted to women, but doesn't want to label herself.

She identifies as a feminist, and believes that equal rights should be a normality and that her responsibility as a woman includes "being confident and not standing down for any ego or suit".

=== Residence ===
In 2014, Jessie J relocated from London to Los Angeles, California. She cited work opportunities and dissatisfaction with the level of focus in the UK on her personal life rather than on her singing, saying, "In America they see me as a singer whereas here I feel that people don't appreciate my voice".

=== Relationships and children ===
In November 2014, she began dating American singer Luke James. The couple ended their relationship in October 2015. It is unclear whether the pair rekindled their relationship, but they went on to perform together a couple of times. In 2018, she started dating American actor Channing Tatum. They broke up in 2019, but rekindled their romance in 2020 before breaking up again later that year.

In 2021, she began a relationship with Danish-Israeli professional basketball player Chanan Colman. In January 2023, she announced that she was pregnant with her first child. Their son was born in May 2023. In July 2026, Jessie and Chanan decided to end their relationship after 5 years together.

=== Health ===
In early 2011, she suffered a panic attack on stage after she was forced to perform in the dark. "I did a gig recently and had a panic attack on stage," she said. "The night was called 'Black Out' and I had to perform in the dark. I asked them to turn on the lights and they didn't. I was onstage in pitch black and, because I couldn't see anything, I started to panic. It was awful."

Jessie J is a vegan and is a teetotaler.

In an Instagram post on Christmas Eve in 2020, she revealed that she has been diagnosed with Ménière's disease. In the post, she wrote how the condition made her feel like "someone crawled" into her ear "and turned a hair dryer on". The disorder affects the inner ear, and can lead to severe dizziness, ringing in the ear and hearing loss.

In November 2021, she announced that she had suffered a miscarriage.

In July 2024, she revealed she had been diagnosed with both obsessive–compulsive disorder (OCD) and attention deficit hyperactivity disorder (ADHD).

In June 2025, she underwent surgery for early-stage breast cancer.

== Charitable activities ==
Jessie J has appeared on the major UK charity telethons, Children in Need and Comic Relief, both broadcast on the BBC. She confirmed on 2 August 2011 that she would be shaving her hair off for charity in 2012. Speaking via her official Twitter account she said: "It's hair, It will grow back. Even if it takes two years, if it saves lives it's worth it. Even if its one life that's something." On 15 March 2013, Jessie's head was shaved live during Red Nose Day 2013, helping to raise money for Comic Relief.

In November 2011, Jessie J performed "Nobody's Perfect" at the charity concert Children in Need Rocks Manchester held at the Manchester Arena to raise money for Children in Need 2011. Jessie J is a supporter of UK children's charity Believe in Magic, a charity that grants wishes to terminally ill children across the UK. In July 2012 she performed "Laserlight" on stage with a 7-year-old fan, leukaemia sufferer Daniel Sullivan. Sullivan died four months later.

In August 2025, Jessie J called for an end to the suffering of Israeli hostage Evyatar David after sharing footage of him in Hamas captivity on Instagram.

== Discography ==
- Who You Are (2011)
- Alive (2013)
- Sweet Talker (2014)
- R.O.S.E. (2018)
- This Christmas Day (2018)
- Don't Tease Me with a Good Time (2025)

== Filmography ==
Television
Year	Title	Role	Notes
2011	Saturday Night Live	Herself	Episode: "Zach Galifianakis/Jessie J"
2012–2013	The Voice UK	Coach / Judge	Series 1–2
2015–2016	The Voice Australia	Coach / Judge	Seasons 4–5
2016	Grease: Live	Opening act singer	Television special
2018	Singer	Contestant	Talent competition, winner of the sixth season
2019	Celebrity Gogglebox	Herself	Reality television show
2019	The Voice Kids UK	Coach / Judge	Season 3
2020	One World: Together at Home	Herself	Television special

Film
Year	Title	Role	Notes
2016	Ice Age: Collision Course	Brooke	Voice

== Tours ==
=== Headlining ===
- Heartbeat Tour (2011–2012)
- Alive Tour (2013)
- Sweet Talker Tour (2015)
- R.O.S.E Tour (2017–2018)
- No Secrets Tour (2026)

=== Opening ===
- Girls Aloud Tangled Up Tour (2008)
- Chris Brown Fan Appreciation Tour (2009)

=== Special guest ===
- The Jingle Ball Tour (December 2014)
