= Wild (Jessie J song) =

2013 single by Jessie J

Single by Jessie J featuring Big Sean and Dizzee Rascal

from the album Alive
- Released: 26 May 2013
- Studio: 4220 Feng Shui Studios (Hollywood, CA); Belly of the Beast (London, England); Conway Recording Studios (Hollywood, CA); Sarm Studios (London, England); The Mothership (Hollywood, CA)
- Genre: Dance-pop
- Length: 3:54: 3:43 (featuring Big Sean); 3:28 (No Rap Edit)
- Label: Lava; Universal Republic
- Songwriters: Jessica Cornish; Joshua Coleman; Claude Kelly; Dylan Mills; Sean Anderson
- Producer: Ammo

Jessie J singles chronology
"Remember Me" (2012)	"Wild" (2013)	"It's My Party" (2013)

Big Sean singles chronology
"Switch Up" (2013)	"Wild" (2013)	"Beware" (2013)

Dizzee Rascal singles chronology
"Scream" (2012)	"Wild" (2013)	"Goin' Crazy" (2013)

Audio sample
- file; help

Music video
- "Wild" on YouTube

"Wild" is a single by English singer-songwriter Jessie J and the lead single from her second studio album, Alive (2013). The single released in the United Kingdom and Ireland features American rapper Big Sean and British MC Dizzee Rascal, while the single released in other countries such as Australia, the United States and the Netherlands only features Big Sean. It was written by Jessica Cornish, Claude Kelly, Dylan Mills, Joshua Coleman and Sean Anderson and produced by Ammo. The single was released as a download on 26 May 2013 in the United Kingdom. it reached #38 in the UK year-end chart, selling more than 300,000 copies. it also ended up at #71 in the Australian year-end chart, selling more than 150,000 copies.

== Background ==
Songwriter Claude Kelly penned "Wild", which features rappers Big Sean and Dizzee Rascal and was produced by American musician Ammo, who is signed to Dr. Luke's publishing company Prescription Songs as a producer and songwriter. Jessie J told Capital London that she wanted someone "really British" and "really American" in terms of guests. "We wrote the song and I actually had a middle eight," she explained, "and I said to Claude Kelly, who's the executive producer on this album, 'I feel like this should have a rapper on it' and I was like 'how about two?'". The song is in the key of B minor.

== Music video ==
The music video was directed by Emil Nava. The video leaked on 25 May 2013. The music video opens with the singer, with her newly shaved blonde hair from Comic Relief, walking onto the video's set. She then begins to dance, which is intercut with scenes of her wearing what looks to be a leopard print bodysuit. Jessie J revealed in an interview that the leopard print is actually sprayed onto her skin. Big Sean and Dizzee Rascal also appear to rap their verses, and then continue to dance with Jessie throughout the ending of the video.

== Live performances ==
On 22 May, Jessie J posted a clip of an acoustic version of "Wild" onto her YouTube account. The video attracted over a million views within two weeks. The day before the song's release, 25 May, Jessie J performed an acoustic snippet of the song at her headline slot at the Mawazine festival in Morocco. The first televised performance of the track was Sound of Change's "Chime for Change Live" benefit concert in Twickenham Stadium. The performance was broadcast to 150 countries around the globe on 1 June. The same day, the song was performed at the All Starz Summer Party in Reading's Madejski Stadium. The song has been promoted at several European music festivals throughout the summer of 2013.

== Track listings ==
- Digital download
1. "Wild" (featuring Big Sean and Dizzee Rascal) – 3:54
- Worldwide digital download
1. "Wild" (featuring Big Sean) – 3:43
- Digital download – The Wild EP
1. "Wild" (no rap edit) – 3:28
2. "Wild" (instrumental) – 3:27
3. "Wild" (featuring Big Sean and Dizzee Rascal) (Show N Prove remix) – 4:10
4. "Wild" (Show 'N' Prove instrumental) – 4:09
- CD single
1. "Wild" – 3:29
2. "Wild" (featuring Big Sean & Dizzee Rascal) – 3:54

== Charts ==
=== Weekly charts ===
Chart (2013)	Peak position
Australia (ARIA)	6
Austria (Ö3 Austria Top 40)	34
Belgium (Ultratip Bubbling Under Flanders)	5
Belgium (Ultratip Bubbling Under Wallonia)	19
Denmark (Tracklisten)	16
France (SNEP)	160
Germany (GfK)	12
Greece (IFPI)	2
Ireland (IRMA)	9
Italy (FIMI)	99
Netherlands (Single Top 100)	63
Lebanon (The Official Lebanese Top 20)	3
New Zealand (Recorded Music NZ)	24
Poland (Polish Airplay New)	1
Scottish Singles Sales (Official Charts)	5
Slovakia Airplay (ČNS IFPI)	6
Spain (Promusicae)	40
Switzerland (Schweizer Hitparade)	46
UK Singles (Official Charts)	5
US Bubbling Under Hot 100 (Billboard)	4

=== Year-end charts ===
Chart (2013)	Position
Australia (ARIA)	71
UK Singles (Official Charts Company)	38

== Certifications ==
Region	Certification	Certified units/sales
Australia (ARIA)	2× Platinum	140,000^{^}
Brazil (Pro-Música Brasil)	Gold	30,000^{‡}
New Zealand (RMNZ)	Gold	7,500^{*}
United Kingdom (BPI)	Gold	400,000^{‡}
Streaming
Denmark (IFPI Danmark)	Gold	900,000^{†}
^{*} Sales figures based on certification alone.^{^} Shipments figures based on certification alone.^{‡} Sales+streaming figures based on certification alone.^{†} Streaming-only figures based on certification alone.

== Release history ==
Region	Date	Label	Format
United Kingdom	26 May 2013	Universal Republic	Digital download
Worldwide	27 May 2013	Universal Republic	Digital download
United Kingdom	30 June 2013	Universal Republic	Digital EP
Germany	19 July 2013	Universal Republic	CD single
