= It's My Party (Jessie J song) =

Single by Jessie J

from the album Alive
- Released: 6 September 2013
- Studio: KMA Studios (New York, NY); Sarm Studios (London)
- Length: 3:38
- Label: Lava; Universal Island
- Songwriters: Jessica Cornish; Claude Kelly; John Larderi; Colin Norman
- Producers: John Larderi; Claude Kelly

Jessie J singles chronology
"Wild" (2013)	"It's My Party" (2013)	"Thunder" (2013)

Music video
- "It's My Party" on YouTube

"It's My Party" is a song by English singer-songwriter Jessie J, released as the second single from her second studio album, Alive (2013). The song was written by Jessie J, Claude Kelly, John Lardieri and Colin Norman, and produced by Lardieri and Kelly. The track premiered on UK radio on 5 August 2013 and was officially released in the UK via iTunes on 15 September 2013. Jessie J recorded the official video at the end of June and it was directed by Emil Nava.

== Background ==
"It's My Party" is a mid-tempo song in the key of A major, written by Jessie J, Claude Kelly John Lardieri & Colin Norman. The song received its first radio play on Capital FM on 5 August 2013 and was released on 15 September 2013. The song shares its title with Lesley Gore's 1963 hit song. Speaking on the syndicated radio show, In:Demand with Alex James, Jessie revealed that it was her detractors who inspired the song. "A lot of the time the haters – I hate calling them haters but that's the easiest way to sum it up – they need love more so than anyone else," she said. "I don't think hate does anything for the world. It doesn't do any good. I wanted to make sure I had a song that represented what I'm about."

== Reception ==
"It's My Party" garnered mixed reviews from critics. UnrealityTV gave It's My Party three stars (out of five) wrote, "I feel Jessie’s vocals are distorted at times on It’s My Party, the chord is too high – it was the same problem with Wild at points in the song". Kevipod of DirectLyrics said, "On the first listen, "It's My Party" sounds like a big utter mess. It strikes as generic, not current, the vocals are a mess, and the talking she does is...I cannot find the right words to describe this. What's happening to Jessie J this era?. For real!".

Karen Lanza of PopCrush commented: "Hearing a song called ‘It’s My Party,’ you expect to indulge the recording artist as much as you do your bestie when she throws herself a birthday bash. It is, after all, her party, and she'll most likely do whatever the heck she wants. But it doesn't mean you have to like it. With her newly released single, Jessie J fails to take full advantage of the listener's goodwill following the urban-edged ‘Wild,’ the well-received first track off of her as-yet-untitled second album. With its frantic beats and eff-off lyrics, ‘It’s My Party’ aims to be a full-stop dance-floor anthem for the waning days of summer. The lyrics are indeed fun — who doesn't love telling off haters? — but the tune itself is lacking the hooks to keep you from forgetting it the second its 3 minutes, 38 seconds are over".

== Music video ==
The music video was directed by Emil Nava. Jessie told about the song's music video. "It's basically me having parties," she said. "Three very different parties that I kind of bring together as one big party. There's some cameos in there, some of my best mates in there (Daley and model Jourdan Dunn). It's a fun video where it's just me being silly. A lot of humor."

John Walker of MTV Buzzworthy commented: "The clip opens on our boisterous heroine alone in a hallway, where she peeps through the keyholes into two very different party scenes: the first prim and proper, the second completely OOC. Obviously Jessie picks the fun party, where she bounces around with her newfound freak friends [including model Anita De Bauch] and breaks into the chorus: "It's my party/ I'll do what I want"."

== Track listing ==
Digital download – single
No.	Title	Length
1.	"It's My Party"	3:38

Digital download – EP
No.	Title	Length
1.	"It's My Party" (All About She UKG Mix) (featuring MC Neat)	3:44
2.	"It's My Party" (All About She Night Mix)	4:11
3.	"It's My Party" (Westfunk & Steve Smart Club Mix)	4:51
4.	"It's My Party" (Instrumental Edit)	3:38

No.	Title	Length
1.	"It's My Party"	3:38
2.	"It's My Party" (Westfunk & Steve Smart Radio Edit)	2:55

== Credits and personnel ==
Credits adapted from the liner notes of Alive.

- Songwriting – Claude Kelly, Colin Norman, Jessica Cornish, John Larderi
- Music production – Claude Kelly, Johnny Blk
- Additional production – Colino Fresh
- Vocal production – Claude Kelly
- Programming – Colino Fresh
- Mixing – Serban Ghenea
- Engineering – Mark Goodchild, Joel Peters, Justin Pancione, John Hanes
- Mastering – Stuart Hawkes

== Charts ==
=== Weekly charts ===
Chart (2013–14)	Peak position
Australia (ARIA)	12
Belgium (Ultratip Bubbling Under Flanders)	4
Belgium (Ultratip Bubbling Under Wallonia)	20
Hungary (Rádiós Top 40)	15
Ireland (IRMA)	12
Scotland Singles (OCC)	4
UK Singles (OCC)	3

=== Year-end charts ===
Chart (2013)	Position
UK Singles (Official Charts Company)	124
Chart (2014)	Position
Hungary (Rádiós Top 40)	81

== Certifications ==
Region	Certification	Certified units/sales
Australia (ARIA)	Platinum	70,000^{^}
United Kingdom (BPI)	Silver	200,000^{‡}
^{^} Shipments figures based on certification alone.^{‡} Sales+streaming figures based on certification alone.

== Release history ==
Region	Date	Format	Label
Germany	6 September 2013	CD single	Universal Music
United Kingdom	15 September 2013	Digital download	Lava Records, Island Records
