= Giorgio Tuinfort =

Dutch record producer (born 1981)

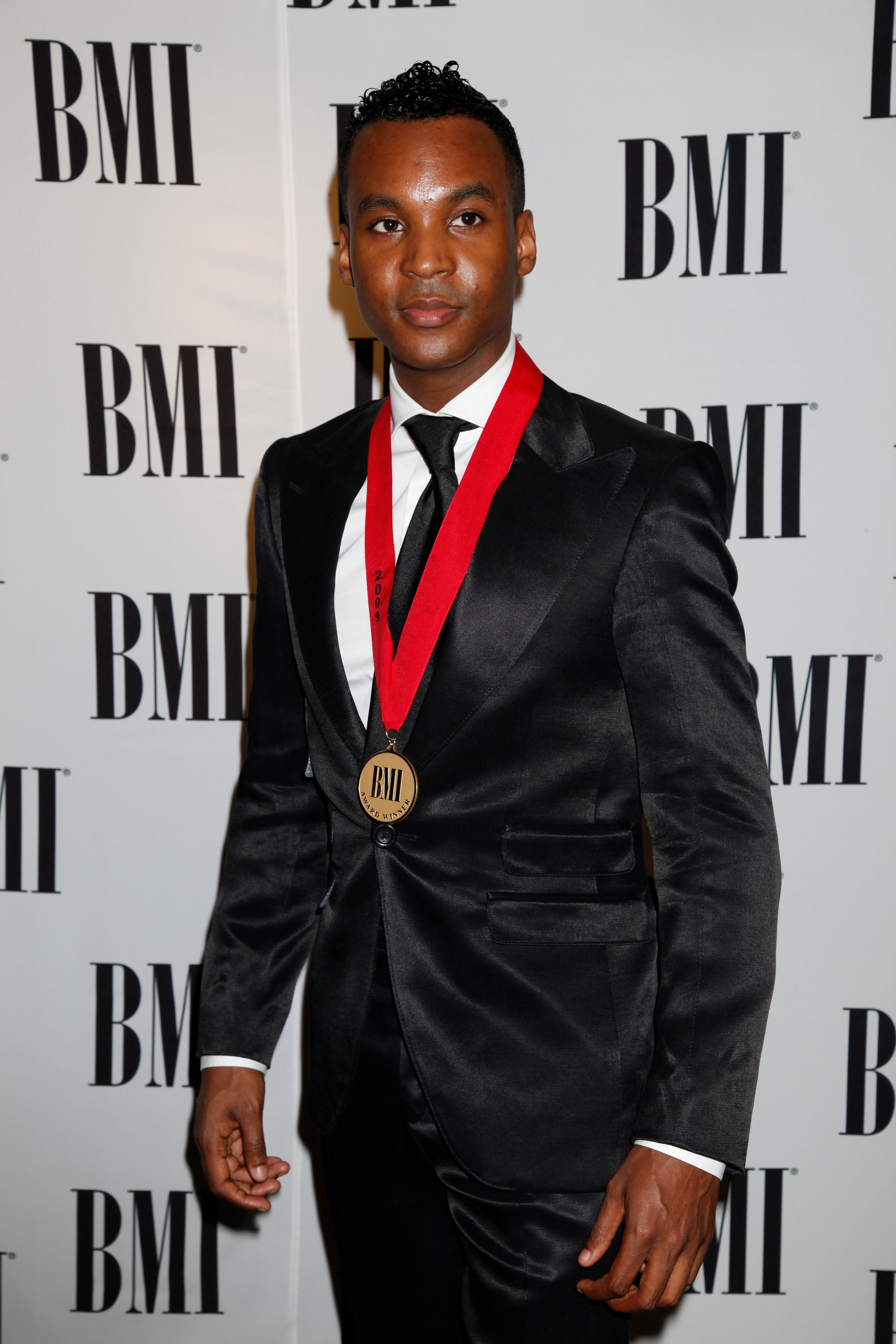
- Tuinfort in 2009

Background information
- Born: Giorgio Hesdey Tuinfort; 30 April 1981 (age 45); Paramaribo, Suriname
- Genres: Pop; R&B; classical; dance
- Occupations: Record producer; songwriter; keyboardist
- Instruments: Piano; keyboards
- Formerly of: D-Men
- Website: giorgiotuinfort.com

Giorgio Hesdey Tuinfort (born 30 April 1981) is a Dutch record producer and pianist. He is best known for his production work for Senegalese-American singer Akon and DJ David Guetta. Tuinfort has been credited on releases by artists such as Michael Jackson, Gwen Stefani, Rihanna, Sia, Lady Gaga, Martin Garrix, Ariana Grande, Céline Dion, Charlie Puth, Britney Spears, Whitney Houston, Usher, others Lionel Richie, among others.

== Biography ==
Born in Suriname, Tuinfort moved to the Netherlands at the age of one. His musical career started at age four, after he attended a special music class for toddlers. After being touted as a "musical promise", he was admitted to the Young Talent Class of the Royal Conservatory of The Hague in 1992. Tuinfort then studied Classical music, with his major instrument being the piano.

Tuinfort's production and composition abilities were first discovered in 1997 by Rutger “Rutti” Kroese, who gave him the platform to work with well-established Dutch artists such as Re-Play, Brace, Ebon-E, Negativ and Lange Frans & Baas B. Through this, Tuinfort became a sought-after name in local music production. Subsequently, Tuinfort embarked on an international career and moved to the United States to work with the then-upcoming Senegalese American recording artist Akon. As his frequent co-producer, he saw commercial success with contributions to the singer's singles including "“Right Now (Na, Na, Na)", "Beautiful", and "What You Got".

In the years following, he collaborated with numerous international artists. He began collaborating with French DJ David Guetta in 2009, and saw further success blending EDM with pop and urban music. This resulted in him contributing to Guetta's singles such as "Titanium" with Sia and "One Last Time" with Ariana Grande. In the interim, Giorgio has shown his intercontinental abilities with successes on both Japanese and Indian soil. He co-produced ‘Scarlet’ for the Japanese group J Soul Brothers II, which became a major success and reached the number one position on the Japanese charts. In India, he co-produced “Chammak Challo” for the Bollywood film Ra.One. The song was named the most successful digital song and video of the year, winning a Merchi “Song of the Year” Award.

Tuinfort composed musical themes for the UEFA 2016 European Football Championships. Aside from the title song with David Guetta, Tuinfort also composed classical renditions, which were recorded by the 130-piece Netherlands Philharmonic Orchestra and received international praise.

Tuinfort, together with Franck van der Heijden, is the composer of the UEFA Nations League theme song, which was lauded by critics as one of the best contemporary classical pieces of modern times. Giorgio once again composed all music for the UEFA Euro 2020, including the official song of the tournament ‘We Are the People’ together with Martin Garrix, Bono and The Edge.

Giorgio continues his musical success story, as recently as the 2025 smash "Gone Gone Gone" by DJ and music producer David Guetta, American singer-songwriter Teddy Swims and Australian singer-songwriter Tones and I.

When asked, Giorgio always mentions Classical Music as the "Love of his Life" and expresses his ambitions to release his own music in 2026.

== Awards ==
Giorgio was nominated for a Grammy Award four times, winning twice. He won the prestigious BMI Songwriter Award an unprecedented 30 times. He is a recipient of the Buma Export Award (an award given to Dutch composers who have sold the most records abroad). He was also awarded the Golden Harp (Dutch music accomplishment award) and a Gouden Kalf (Dutch equivalent of the Oscars) for his music score for the Dutch film Bolletjes Blues. In 2015, Giorgio was commended by the Dutch royal family in recognition of his achievements and contributions to Dutch music on an international scale.

== Personal life ==
Giorgio is known for avoiding the limelight and not being present on social media, citing "Music should speak for itself".

== International discography ==
Incomplete discography

- Bad - David Guetta
- Beautiful – Akon featuring Colby O' Donis
- Birthmark – Akon
- Blown Away – Akon
- Body Ache – Britney Spears
- Body on Me – Nelly and Ashanti featuring Akon
- Chammak Challo – Akon, Shah Rukh Khan from the movie Ra.One
- Change Up – Fabolous featuring Akon
- Club Can't Handle Me – Flo Rida featuring David Guetta
- Crank It Up – David Guetta featuring Akon
- Cross that Line – Rick Ross featuring Akon
- Dangerous – David Guetta featuring Sam Martin
- Do Right – Mario featuring Akon
- Everything Wonderful – The Black Eyed Peas featuring David Guetta
- Freedom – Akon
- Forgive Me – Leona Lewis
- Get That Clear – Brick and Lace
- Hey Mama – David Guetta featuring Nicki Minaj, Bebe Rexha and Afrojack
- Hold My Hand – Michael Jackson and Akon
- Hold On and Believe – Martin Garrix and The Federal Empire
- Hypnotized – Plies featuring Akon
- I Am Not My Hair – India Irie featuring Akon
- I Can Only Imagine – David Guetta featuring Chris Brown and Lil Wayne
- I Got You – Whitney Houston
- I Tried – Bone Thugs 'n Harmony featuring Akon
- It Should Be Easy – Britney Spears featuring will.i.am
- Just Go – Lionel Richie featuring Akon
- Just One Last Time – David Guetta featuring Taped Rai
- Keep You Much Longer – Akon
- LaserLight – Jessie J featuring David Guetta
- Let You Go – Colby O'Donis
- Lights On – Sean Paul
- Like I Never Left – Whitney Houston
- Little Bad Girl – David Guetta featuring Taio Cruz and Ludacris
- Love Never Felt So Good – Michael Jackson
- Listen – David Guetta featuring John Legend
- Lovers on the Sun – David Guetta featuring Sam Martin
- Ma Faille - Céline Dion
- Love in America – Mohombi
- Match Made in Heaven – Mohombi
- Mirrors – Natalia Kills
- Naughty Naughty – Porcelain Black
- Never Forget Me – Bone Thugs 'N Harmony featuring Akon
- Nothing Really Matters - Mr Probz
- Never Never – Brick and Lace
- Night of Your Life – David Guetta featuring Jennifer Hudson
- Nothing Left to Give – Lionel Richie
- Now That I Found You – Britney Spears
- One Last Time - Ariana Grande
- Over the Edge – Akon
- Phresh Out the Runway – Rihanna
- Play Hard – David Guetta featuring Ne-Yo and Akon
- Repeat – David Guetta featuring Jessie J
- Rest of My Life – Ludacris featuring Usher and David Guetta
- Right Now (Na Na Na) – Akon
- Right Now – Rihanna featuring David Guetta
- Sexy Bitch – David Guetta featuring Akon
- Shake Down – Akon
- She Wolf (Falling to Pieces) – David Guetta featuring Sia
- Shot Me Down - David Guetta featuring Skylar Grey
- Silencio – Suzanna Lubrano
- Strawberry Letter 23 – Quincy Jones featuring Akon
- Still Speedin' – Sway
- S.T.O.P – David Guetta featuring Ryan Tedder
- Sunshine – David Guetta featuring Avicii
- Sweat – Snoop Dogg featuring David Guetta
- Tardi Di Mas – Suzanna Lubrano
- Til It's Gone – Britney Spears
- Tired of Runnin' – Akon
- The Alphabeat – David Guetta
- The B.O.Y (Best One Yet) – The Black Eyed Peas
- The Sweet Escape – Gwen Stefani featuring Akon
- The Whisperer – David Guetta featuring Sia
- This One's for You (David Guetta song) - David Guetta featuring Zara Larsson - Official Anthem for UEFA Euro 2016
- Titanium – David Guetta featuring Sia
- Tu Sauras - Céline Dion
- Turn Me On – David Guetta featuring Nicki Minaj
- Under My Nose – Colby O'Donis
- Up All Night - Charlie Puth
- Wanna Be Startin' Somethin 2008 – Michael Jackson featuring Akon
- We Don't Care – Akon
- What I Did for Love – David Guetta featuring Emeli Sande
- What You Got – Colby O'Donis featuring Akon
- #WHERESTHELOVE - The Black Eyed Peas featuring The World
- Where Them Girls At – David Guetta featuring Flo Rida and Nicki Minaj
- Who's That Chick? – David Guetta featuring Rihanna
- Without You – David Guetta featuring Usher
- Yesterday – David Guetta featuring Bebe Rexha

== Dutch selected music discography ==
Bolletjes Blues – Welkom in ons leven featuring Derenzo, Kimo, Mr Probz, Negativ, Raymzter

Brace – Cupido

Brace – Dilemma

Brace – Dit ben ik featuring Brainpower

Brace – Drijfzand

Brace – Hartendief featuring Ali B

Brace – Les Geleerd featuring Lange Frans

Brace – Samen

Brace – Van Jongen naar Man

Brace – Vraag Jezelf eens Af

Dignity – Everything Has Changed (Piano Version)

E-Life – K.I.T.A

Ebon-E – On My Way

Excellent – Doe Rustig

Gio – Je Hebt me

Goldy – Goldy

Gordon – I'll be your Voice (Songfestival 2003)

Gordon & Re-Play – Een Nieuw Begin featuring Extince

Gordon & Re-Play – Vrienden voor het Leven

Kinderen voor Kinderen – 100 Jaar

Kinderen voor Kinderen – Als de Wereld nou van Mij is

Kinderen voor Kinderen – Dierenvriend

Kinderen voor Kinderen – Leef met Elkaar

Kinderen voor Kinderen – Ons Hele Leven Lang

Kinderen voor Kinderen – Wereldplan

Lange Frans – Doofpot

Lange Frans – Testament

Lange Frans – Zing voor me featuring Thé Lau

Lange Frans & Baas B – Dankbaar featuring Suzanna Lubrano

Lange Frans & Baas B – Geef me nog een Kans featuring Brace

Lange Frans & Baas B – Kamervragen

Lange Frans & Baas B – Neem me niet Kwalijk

Lange Frans & Baas B – Het Land van

Lange Frans & Baas B – Venus en Mars

Lange Frans & Baas B – Verder

Mark Dakriet – De Reis

Mark Dakriet – Dit Lied is Voor Jou

Mark Dakriet – Droom Maar

Mark Dakriet – Een Laatste Dans

Mark Dakriet – Er is een Weg

Mark Dakriet – Je Moeten Missen

Mark Dakriet – Muziek

Mark Dakriet – Nooit Meer Alleen

Mark Dakriet – Nu het Over is met Ruth Jacott

Mark Dakriet – Samen Sterk met Lady Smith Black Mambazo

Mark Dakriet – Tegen Beter Weten in

Mark Dakriet – Voor Altijd

Mark Dakriet – Vrij Zijn

Mark Dakriet – Waardeloos met Suzanna Lubrano

Mark Dakriet – We Komen er wel Uit

Negativ – Dingen Gedaan

Negativ – Je Weet niet wie ik Ben

Negativ – Kijk Eens om je Heen

Negativ – Negativitijdperk

Negativ – Niks is wat het Zijn moet featuring Ebon-E

Negativ – Onbreekbaar

Raymzter – Soms Gaat het Mis

Re-Play – Die Tijd

Re-Play – Hum Hum

Re-Play – Niemand

Re-Play – Piraterij

Re-Play – Schaakmat

Re-Play – Ware Liefde

Sat-R-Day – My Girl's Best Friend

Trijntje Oosterhuis – We are Gold
