= Turn Me On (David Guetta song) =

2011 single by David Guetta

Single by David Guetta featuring Nicki Minaj

from the album Nothing but the Beat
- Released: 13 December 2011
- Recorded: 2011
- Genre: EDM
- Length: 3:19
- Label: Astralwerks; Capitol
- Songwriters: David Guetta; Onika Maraj; Giorgio Tuinfort; Esther Dean
- Producers: Guetta; Tuinfort; Black Raw

David Guetta singles chronology
"Titanium" (2011)	"Turn Me On" (2011)	"Wild One Two" (2012)

Nicki Minaj singles chronology
"Dance (Ass)" (2011)	"Turn Me On" (2011)	"Give Me All Your Luvin'" (2012)

Music video
- "Turn Me On" (feat. Nicki Minaj) on YouTube

"Turn Me On" is a song by French DJ and record producer David Guetta from his fifth studio album Nothing but the Beat (2011). Vocals are provided by Trinidadian American rapper and singer Nicki Minaj, whose second studio album Pink Friday: Roman Reloaded (2012) features the song as a bonus song on its deluxe version. It was written by Ester Dean, David Guetta and Giorgio Tuinfort, with a rap written by Minaj.

The song has garnered generally favorable responses from music critics, who complimented Minaj's appearance on the track, while also dismissing the Auto-Tune used on Minaj's vocals. It has been chosen as the fifth official single from Nothing but the Beat. It impacted U.S. Top 40/Mainstream and Rhythmic radio on 13 December 2011. A remixes EP was released in January 2012 internationally and in February 2012 in the US and Canada. The song also marks Guetta's best-peaking single in the United States, tied with "Without You", both of which peaked at 4 on the Billboard Hot 100. The song was briefly used to promote WWE WrestleMania XXVIII. As of December 2014, the song has sold 2.6 million copies in the United States.

== Background ==
"People don't really know her as a singer and she's killing it on that track. People know her for her crazy rapping but that shows what she can do as a singer. Sometimes I meet people by accident or they call me up but with Nicki it was me chasing her. For a year I wanted to work with her and she was hard to reach. But the moment we got into the studio and had the music it was great."

— Guetta told UK newspaper The Sun about the collaboration.

"Turn Me On" was written by Ester Dean, David Guetta, and Giorgio Tuinfort. An additional rap was written by Nicki Minaj for the song. On an interview with Billboard, David Guetta said: "I am so proud of what Nicki did on this record because we know her for those crazy raps but the other record that we have, she is singing like—oh man. The world is gonna be shocked. Because they don't know her like this" "And we came up with that amazing song and she just killed it."

== Composition ==
"Turn Me On"
A sample of "Turn Me On".

"Turn Me On" is an EDM song and features Minaj on vocals. It is the second track from Nothing but the Beat that features Minaj, along with the single "Where Them Girls At". The song is written in the key of C minor, with a simple chord sequence of C minor-B♭ major-A♭ major. It is written in common time with a moderate dance groove of 128 beats per minute. Nicki Minaj's vocals span from G_{3} to E♭_{5} in the song.

== Critical reception ==
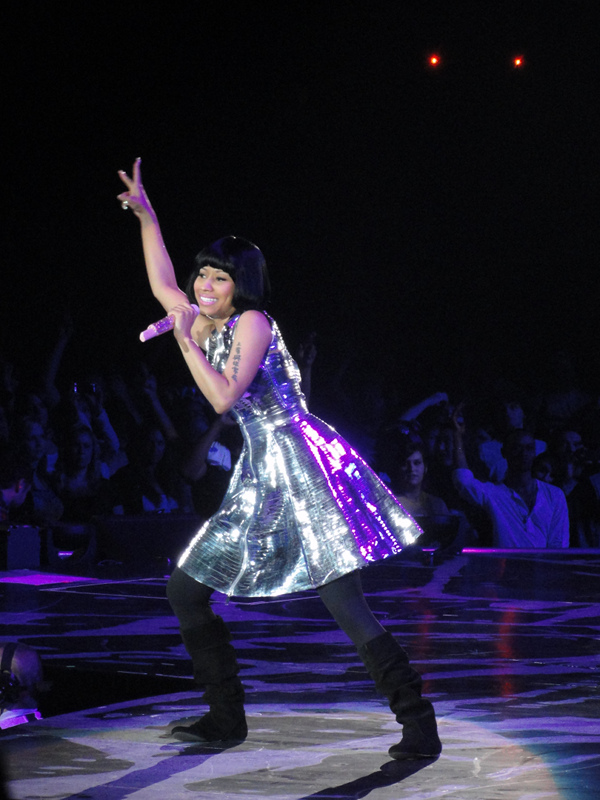
Nicki Minaj live at the Femme Fatale Tour

Al Fox of BBC Music wrote that "the best results come when Guetta mercilessly rips artists from their comfort zone – take Minaj in songbird mode on 'Turn Me On." Allmusic's David Jeffries wrote that "Nicki Minaj does a pole dance on the operating table for 'Turn Me On', while picking it as one of the best tracks on the album. Carol Cooper of The Village Voice gave a review talking about her voice, writing that "on 'Turn Me On' Nicki Minaj gamely shifts between her Madonna range and her Rihanna register." Ken Capobianco somewhat echoed the same thought of Cooper, writing that " Nicki Minaj delivers solid singing on the track."

Joe Copplestone of PopMatters wrote a mixed review, saying that "the song showcases a suspiciously melodic performance by Minaj, with massive hooks that somehow let her make the transition from freak to diva." Harley Brown of Consequence of Sound thought that the "skipping beat and screaming synths are more recognizable as quintessential techno." Genevieve Koski of The A.V. Club was more negative, writing that on the song Minaj is a "faceless-disco-diva."

== Music video ==
=== Development ===
The music video for "Turn Me On" was filmed in November 2011 by director Sanji. A sneak preview of the video was released on 27 January 2012 with the full video being released on 31 January.

=== Synopsis ===
Minaj surrounded by bald human dolls

Set in a steampunk world, Guetta plays a mad scientist creating his very own Nicki Minaj from mechanical parts. The clip opens on Guetta, perhaps trying out some early cosmetic-surgery tactics, putting the final touches on his Minaj doll plans. Then it focuses on the mechanisms behind the Nicki being: latex lips, brass wiring, tubing and various other gizmos. As the song hits the chorus for the first time, fans get a view of his creation. Her plastic skin is shiny and completely bare as she slowly transforms into the very human-looking Nicki. Seemingly pleased with his creation, Guetta unleashes it onto the world. The entrance to the second verse shows Minaj, dressed in a long black dress, black top hat and shocking pink hip-length hair, leaving Guetta's studio through two black gates and is now free to roam the streets, filled with other doll-like creatures who can't help but stare at Guetta's incredibly lifelike creation. With Minaj continuing her journey through town, the other jealous doll creatures make their way to Guetta's lab, where he begins to work on them too, giving them more lifelike appearances. The female creatures then discover that he is a doll himself, however, his interior resembles chainmail. The female dolls then start to feel him. Meanwhile, Nicki is surrounded by the male dolls as she belts out the song. As the video finishes, Minaj is spotted on horseback, as the female dolls make their escape from Guetta's place of business.

== Live performances ==
Guetta and Minaj performed together at the American Music Awards of 2011 as the opening act, with the duo performing "Turn Me On" and Minaj performing her hit, "Super Bass", from her debut album, Pink Friday, with an intro of "Wet" by Snoop Dogg. The song has also been performed solo by Minaj on 2012's New Year's Rockin' Eve with Ryan Seacrest, and during the 2012 NBA All-Star Game opening show. Minaj has also performed the song on her debut concert tour, the Pink Friday Tour. She has also included the song in her Pink Friday: Reloaded Tour, Pinkprint Tour, the Nicki Wrld Tour and Gag City Tour setlists.

== Track listing ==
- Digital download – EP
1. "Turn Me On" (Michael Calfan Remix) – 5:43
2. "Turn Me On" (David Guetta and Laidback Luke Remix) – 5:08
3. "Turn Me On" (Sidney Samson Remix) – 5:54
4. "Turn Me On" (JP Candela Remix) – 7:02
5. "Turn Me On" (Sabastien Drums Remix) – 6:19
6. "Turn Me On" (Extended Version) – 4:37
- German CD single
1. "Turn Me On" (Original Version) – 3:19
2. "Turn Me On" (Michael Calfan Remix) – 5:43
3. "Turn Me On" (David Guetta and Laidback Luke Remix) – 5:08
4. "Turn Me On" (Sidney Samson Remix) – 5:54
5. "Turn Me On" (JP Candela Remix) – 7:02
6. "Turn Me On" (Sabastien Drums Remix) – 6:19
7. "Turn Me On" (Extended Version) – 4:37
- 12" vinyl
1. "Turn Me On" (Michael Calfan Remix) – 5:43
2. "Turn Me On" (JP Candela Remix) – 7:02
3. "Turn Me On" (David Guetta and Laidback Luke Remix) – 5:08
4. "Turn Me On" (Sabastien Drums Remix) – 6:19
5. "Turn Me On" (Sidney Samson Remix) – 5:54
6. "Turn Me On" (Extended Version) – 4:37

== Charts ==
=== Weekly charts ===
Weekly chart performance for "Turn Me On"
Chart (2011–2012)	Peak position
Australia (ARIA)	3
Australia Dance (ARIA)	1
Austria (Ö3 Austria Top 40)	5
Belgium (Ultratop 50 Flanders)	23
Belgium (Ultratop 50 Wallonia)	10
Canada Hot 100 (Billboard)	3
Canada CHR/Top 40 (Billboard)	1
Canada Hot AC (Billboard)	10
Czech Republic Airplay (ČNS IFPI)	26
Denmark (Tracklisten)	27
Euro Digital Song Sales (Billboard)	5
Finland (Suomen virallinen lista)	17
France (SNEP)	10
Germany (GfK)	6
Hungary (Dance Top 40)	6
Hungary (Rádiós Top 40)	9
Ireland (IRMA)	4
Italy (FIMI)	50
Japan Hot 100 (Billboard)	83
Luxembourg (Billboard)	5
Mexico (Billboard Mexican Airplay)	34
Mexico Anglo (Monitor Latino)	7
Netherlands (Dutch Top 40)	26
Netherlands (Single Top 100)	68
New Zealand (Recorded Music NZ)	2
Norway (VG-lista)	15
Poland (ZPAV)	1
Romania (Romanian Top 100)	75
Scottish Singles Sales (Official Charts)	9
Spain (Promusicae)	15
Sweden (Sverigetopplistan)	29
Switzerland (Schweizer Hitparade)	6
UK Singles (Official Charts)	8
UK Dance (Official Charts)	2
US Billboard Hot 100	4
US Adult Pop Airplay (Billboard)	27
US Dance Club Songs (Billboard)	1
US Dance Airplay (Billboard)	1
US Hot R&B/Hip-Hop Songs (Billboard)	92
US Pop Airplay (Billboard)	2
US Rhythmic Airplay (Billboard)	4
Venezuela Pop Rock General (Record Report)	3

=== Year-end charts ===
2012 year-end chart performance for "Turn Me On"
Chart (2012)	Position
Australia (ARIA)	44
Austria (Ö3 Austria Top 40)	45
Belgium (Ultratop Flanders)	67
Belgium (Ultratop Wallonia)	49
Brazil (Crowley)	71
Canada (Canadian Hot 100)	29
Germany (Media Control AG)	51
Hungary (Dance Top 40)	42
Sweden (Sverigetopplistan)	67
Switzerland (Schweizer Hitparade)	38
UK Singles (Official Charts Company)	35
US Billboard Hot 100	35
US Dance Club Songs (Billboard)	11
US Dance/Mix Show Airplay (Billboard)	9
US Mainstream Top 40 (Billboard)	22
US Rhythmic (Billboard)	22

== Certifications ==
Certifications and sales for "Turn Me On"
Region	Certification	Certified units/sales
Australia (ARIA)	3× Platinum	210,000^{^}
Austria (IFPI Austria)	Gold	15,000^{*}
Canada (Music Canada)	3× Platinum	240,000^{*}
France	—	193,700
Germany (BVMI)	Gold	150,000^{‡}
Italy (FIMI)	Gold	15,000^{*}
Mexico (AMPROFON)	Platinum	60,000^{*}
New Zealand (RMNZ)	Platinum	15,000^{*}
Switzerland (IFPI Switzerland)	2× Platinum	60,000^{^}
United Kingdom (BPI)	Platinum	600,000^{‡}
United States (RIAA)	2× Platinum	2,600,000
Streaming
Denmark (IFPI Danmark)	Platinum	900,000^{†}
^{*} Sales figures based on certification alone.^{^} Shipments figures based on certification alone.^{‡} Sales+streaming figures based on certification alone.^{†} Streaming-only figures based on certification alone.

== Release history ==
Release dates for "Turn Me On"
Country	Date	Format
United States	13 December 2011	Mainstream radio; rhythmic airplay
Norway	27 January 2012	Digital download – Remixes EP
Finland	27 January 2012	Digital download – Remixes EP
Switzerland	27 January 2012	Digital download – Remixes EP
Italy	27 January 2012	Digital download – Remixes EP
Austria	27 January 2012	Digital download – Remixes EP
Netherlands	27 January 2012	Digital download – Remixes EP
France	30 January 2012	Digital download – Remixes EP
Luxembourg	30 January 2012	Digital download – Remixes EP
Sweden	30 January 2012	Digital download – Remixes EP
Singapore	30 January 2012	Digital download – Remixes EP
Portugal	30 January 2012	Digital download – Remixes EP
New Zealand	30 January 2012	Digital download – Remixes EP
Spain	31 January 2012	Digital download – Remixes EP
United States	31 January 2012	Digital download – Remixes EP
Canada	31 January 2012	Digital download – Remixes EP
Germany	9 March 2012	CD single; 12" vinyl

== See also ==
- List of number-one dance singles of 2012 (U.S.)
