= Nothing but the Beat =

2011 album by David Guetta

Studio album by David Guetta
- Released: 26 August 2011
- Recorded: 2010–2011
- Studios: Gum Prod (Paris); Catfield (Paris); Piano Music (Amsterdam); Can Rocas (Ibiza); Color Sound Mastering (Paris)
- Genre: Electropop
- Length: 41:40 (CD-1); 46:42 (CD-2)
- Labels: What a Music; Virgin; EMI
- Producers: David Guetta; Afrojack; Avicii; Mike Caren; Silvio Ecomo; Daddy's Groove; Fabian Lenseen; Frédéric Riesterer; Giorgio Tuinfort; Sandy Vee

David Guetta chronology
One Love (2009)	Nothing but the Beat (2011)	Listen (2014)

Singles from Nothing but the Beat
- 1. "Sweat" Released: 4 March 2011; 2. "Where Them Girls At" Released: 2 May 2011; 3. "Little Bad Girl" Released: 27 June 2011; 4. "Without You" Released: 27 September 2011; 5. "Titanium" Released: 9 December 2011; 6. "Turn Me On" Released: 13 December 2011; 7. "I Can Only Imagine" Released: 2 May 2012

Nothing but the Beat is the fifth studio album by French DJ and record producer David Guetta. It was released on 26 August 2011 as a double album. The first disc features collaborations with artists from the R&B, hip hop and pop worlds such as Lil Wayne, Taio Cruz, Nicki Minaj, Ludacris, Snoop Dogg, Afrojack, Chris Brown, Flo Rida, Usher, Jennifer Hudson, Dev, Timbaland, Jessie J and Sia. Also making guest appearances are will.i.am and Akon whom both previously collaborated with Guetta on his fourth studio album, One Love. In comparison, the second disc features purely instrumental tracks. The album is also Guetta's first album not to feature long-time collaborator Chris Willis on vocals. Critical reviews of the album were mixed.

The album spawned four singles that attained success on the US Billboard Hot 100 – "Where Them Girls At", "Without You", "Turn Me On" and "Titanium" – becoming his third, fourth, fifth and sixth top 20 singles, respectively. On 30 November 2011, the album received a nomination for Grammy Award for Best Dance/Electronica Album at the 54th Grammy Awards. As of October 2012, the album has sold 407,000 copies in the US, and has received platinum certification by the IFPI for sales exceeding 1,000,000 copies throughout Europe. On 26 March 2012, the album was released as a standalone package, via the iTunes Store. This version was previously released through Beatport.

The album was then re-released on 7 September 2012 under the name Nothing but the Beat 2.0. It includes six new tracks including lead single "She Wolf (Falling to Pieces)", which features Sia, who previously collaborated with Guetta on "Titanium". The remixes of this single were released exclusively through Beatport on 7 August 2012. Several tracks from the original album have been removed from the re-release, however all the singles have been retained. A final edition of the album dubbed Nothing but the Beat Ultimate, was released on 10 December 2012 featuring the original album plus all of the new songs from the 2.0 edition – though contained the full-length edits of "Sunshine", "Lunar" and "Metropolis", as opposed to the shorter edits on 2.0 – and a 16-second shorter version of "Where Them Girls At". All ten main singles from Nothing but the Beat, including the Guetta version of "Sweat", have peaked within the top-twenty of the UK Singles Chart and as of January 2015 have all together sold in excess of 4 million copies in the UK.

== Singles ==
"Where Them Girls At" is a collaboration with Flo Rida and Nicki Minaj and was released as the album's first single on 2 May 2011. The release of the single came earlier than planned after computer hackers managed to obtain an early a cappella version of the song, featuring only the rappers' vocals and added their own production to the song before leaking it. It debuted at number fourteen on the Billboard Hot 100 chart, becoming Guetta's third top twenty hit in the United States. The song charted within the top ten in eighteen countries, and peaked at number one on the UK Dance Chart.

"Little Bad Girl" was released as the album's second single on 27 June 2011 and is a collaboration with both Taio Cruz and Ludacris. The music video was released on 18 July 2011. The track entered the top ten in several countries, and peaked at number one in Venezuela. However, the United States was the only territory where the track was not successful, peaking only at number 70. It did, however, fare well on the Billboard Hot Dance Club Songs chart.

"Without You", originally written and recorded by Taio Cruz, is a collaboration with Usher and was released as the album's third single on 14 October 2011. The music video was filmed at the end of July 2011. The track was sent to mainstream radio in the United States on 27 September 2011. It was a success worldwide, and reached the top ten in the United States.

The fourth international single, "Titanium" is a collaboration with Sia released on 9 December 2011. "Titanium" was initially released as a promotional single from the album, and successfully charted worldwide. It was later released as the album's fifth single in the United States, officially impacting Top 40, Mainstream and Rhythmic radio on 24 April 2012.

"Turn Me On" is a collaboration with Nicki Minaj, and was released in the U.S., officially impacting Top 40, Mainstream and Rhythmic radio on 13 December 2011. It was later released as the album's fifth international single in January 2012. The music video was filmed in November 2011 by director Sanji. The video was released on 31 January 2012.

Released on 2 May 2012, the album's sixth single is a collaboration with Chris Brown and Lil Wayne: "I Can Only Imagine". The music video, directed by Colin Tilley, was filmed on 29 May 2012. The video was released on 2 July 2012. The track peaked at number one in Belgium, as well as achieving high success in Poland. The track has also charted in thirteen other territories. It was officially sent to American radio on 7 August 2012, where it peaked at number 44.

Four songs were digitally released as promotional singles for the album: "Titanium" (which later became an official single) on 8 August 2011, "Lunar" (with Afrojack) on 15 August 2011, "Night of Your Life" (featuring Jennifer Hudson) on 22 August 2011 and "The Alphabeat" on 26 March 2012. The first three were released as part of the iTunes Store's countdown to the album's release.

It is noteworthy that all ten main singles from Nothing but the Beat – including "Sweat", Guetta's remix of Snoop Dogg's "Wet" – have peaked within the top-twenty of the UK Singles Chart and as of January 2015 have all together gone on to sell in excess of four million copies in the country.

== Critical reception ==
Professional ratings
Aggregate scores
Source	Rating
AnyDecentMusic?	4.9/10
Metacritic	56/100
Review scores
Source	Rating
AllMusic	3/5 stars
The A.V. Club	C−
The Daily Telegraph	3/5 stars
Entertainment Weekly	B−
The Guardian	2/5 stars
The Irish Times	2/5 stars
MSN Music (Expert Witness)	B+
Q	3/5 stars
Rolling Stone	3/5 stars
Spin	7/10

At Metacritic, which assigns a weighted mean rating out of 100 to reviews from mainstream critics, the album received an average score of 56, based on 17 reviews, which indicates mixed or average reviews. David Jeffries wrote for AllMusic that "Nothing But the Beat offers the same experience as one of Guetta's numerous remix sets", but declared that "something's missing, something along the lines of 'When Love Takes Over'." In the same vein, Al Fox wrote for BBC Music that "Whether you could go so far as to call Guetta an auteur might be pushing it, but it's a cohesive effort, if not quite a work of art." Entertainment Weekly's Mikael Wood praised the tracks "Night of Your Life" and "Titanium" but felt that "the album feels colder than its sweat factor suggests." In an almost neutral review, Jon Dolan wrote for Rolling Stone that the album "shows how good he is at making Eurohouse's thumping trounce and jet-engine synth whoosh feel like natural elements in the hip-hop, R&B and even rock continuum." In his MSN Music "Expert Witness" column, Robert Christgau said that while he "only wish[es] it had a few 'I Gotta Feeling's", "the two Nicki Minaj features come close, Taio Cruz does what he's sposed to for once, the will.i.am preachment makes its escapist statement, and neutering Snoop is fine with both me and the ASPCA."

Ally Carnwath wrote a negative review for The Observer, rating it 1 out of 5 stars, writing that the album's collaborations "struggle to impose any distinctive personality on the overall mood of relentless rictus-grin-inducing euphoria." Tom Ewing from The Guardian criticized Guetta for making "tiring dancefloor fillers" and concluded that "Nothing But the Beat may sound like a one-man hit parade, but it also takes its title far too literally." Eric Henderson wrote negatively for Slant Magazine that "His sound may be the most influential force in pop music today, but he's paradoxically been artistically overshadowed by imitators and innovators alike, all of whom demonstrate a better understanding of power pop's legacy (Lady Gaga's "The Edge of Glory"), dance-floor dynamics (Rihanna's "S&M"), and ridiculous self-awareness (LMFAO's "Party Rock Anthem")."

== Track listing ==
Nothing but the Beat – CD-1: Vocal Album
No.	Title	Writer(s)	Producer(s)	Length
1.	"Where Them Girls At" (featuring Flo Rida and Nicki Minaj)	Tramar Dillard; Onika Maraj; David Guetta; Juan Silinas; Oscar Silinas; Jared Cotter; Michael Caren; Giorgio Tuinfort; Sandy Wilhelm	Guetta; Sandy Vee; Caren^{[a]}	3:30
2.	"Little Bad Girl" (featuring Taio Cruz and Ludacris)	Taio Cruz; Christopher Bridges; Guetta; Tuinfort; Frédéric Riesterer	Guetta; Tuinfort; Riesterer; Daddy's Groove^{[b]}	3:12
3.	"Turn Me On" (featuring Nicki Minaj)	Ester Dean; Maraj; Guetta; Tuinfort	Guetta; Tuinfort; Daddy's Groove^{[b]}	3:19
4.	"Sweat" (vs. Snoop Dogg)	Calvin Broadus; Cheri Williams; Derek Jenkins; Dwayne Richardson; Cassio Ware; David Singer-Vine; Niles Hollowell-Dhar; Guetta; Tuinfort; Riesterer	Guetta; Tuinfort; Riesterer	3:16
5.	"Without You" (featuring Usher)	Taio Cruz; Usher Raymond IV; Rico Love; Guetta; Tuinfort; Riesterer	Guetta; Tuinfort; Riesterer; Daddy's Groove^{[b]}	3:28
6.	"Nothing Really Matters" (featuring will.i.am)	William Adams; Guetta; Tuinfort; Riesterer; Pierre-Luc Rioux	Guetta; Tuinfort; Riesterer	3:39
7.	"I Can Only Imagine" (featuring Chris Brown and Lil Wayne)	Christopher Brown; Dwayne Carter; Jacob Luttrell; Nasri Atweh; Guetta; Tuinfort; Riesterer	Guetta; Riesterer; Daddy's Groove^{[b]}	3:29
8.	"Crank It Up" (featuring Akon)	Aliaune Thiam; Guetta; Tuinfort; Riesterer	Guetta; Tuinfort; Riesterer; Fabian Lenseen^{[b]}; Silvio Ecomo^{[b]}	3:12
9.	"I Just Wanna F." (with Afrojack featuring Timbaland and Dev)	Jacob Luttrell; Amy Kaup; Jessica Sarangay; Singer-Vine; Hollowell-Dhar; Guetta; Nick van de Wall	Guetta; Afrojack	3:23
10.	"Night of Your Life" (featuring Jennifer Hudson)	Crystal Johnson; Anthony Preston; Guetta; Tuinfort	Guetta; Tuinfort	3:41
11.	"Repeat" (featuring Jessie J)	Jessica Cornish; The Invisible Men; Ali Tennant; Guetta; Tuinfort; Riesterer	Guetta; Tuinfort; Riesterer	3:26
12.	"Titanium" (featuring Sia)	Sia Furler; Guetta; Tuinfort; van de Wall	Guetta; Tuinfort; Afrojack	4:05
Total length:				41:40

Nothing but the Beat – CD-2: Electronic Album
No.	Title	Writer(s)	Producer(s)	Length
1.	"The Alphabeat"	Guetta; Tuinfort	Guetta; Tuinfort; Daddy's Groove^{[b]}	4:29
2.	"Lunar" (with Afrojack)	Guetta; van de Wall; Tuinfort	Guetta; Afrojack	5:16
3.	"Sunshine" (with Avicii)	Guetta; Tuinfort; Tim Bergling	Guetta; Tuinfort; Avicii	6:01
4.	"Little Bad Girl" (Instrumental Edit)	Guetta; Tuinfort; Riesterer	Guetta; Tuinfort; Riesterer	4:02
5.	"Metro Music"	Guetta; Tuinfort	Guetta; Tuinfort	4:13
6.	"Toy Story"	Guetta; Tuinfort	Guetta; Tuinfort	3:44
7.	"The Future" (with Afrojack)	Guetta; van de Wall	Guetta; Afrojack	4:16
8.	"Dreams"	Guetta; Tuinfort; Riesterer	Guetta; Tuinfort; Riesterer	4:48
9.	"Paris"	Guetta; Riesterer	Guetta; Riesterer	4:40
10.	"Glasgow"	Guetta; Tuinfort	Guetta; Tuinfort; Daddy's Groove^{[b]}	5:13
Total length:				46:42

Nothing but the Beat (Deluxe and Xmas Edition) – CD-3: Party Mix
No.	Title	Length
1.	"Where Them Girls At" (Nicky Romero and Sidney Samson Remix; featuring Flo Rida and Nicki Minaj)	4:18
2.	"Turn Me On" (Sidney Samson Remix; featuring Nicki Minaj)	5:15
3.	"Sweat" (Guetta & Afrojack Dub Remix; vs. Snoop Dogg)	6:03
4.	"Paris" (Party Mix)	4:03
5.	"Without You" (Nicky Romero Remix; featuring Usher)	4:15
6.	"Little Bad Girl" (New Club Edit; featuring Taio Cruz and Ludacris)	4:14
7.	"The Future" (Party Mix; with Afrojack)	3:56
8.	"Titanium" (Nicky Romero Remix; featuring Sia)	5:40
9.	"Sunshine" (Party Mix; with Avicii)	5:30
10.	"Lunar" (Party Mix; with Afrojack)	4:50

Nothing but the Beat – Digital edition bonus track
No.	Title	Writer(s)	Producer(s)	Length
13.	"I'm a Machine" (featuring Crystal and Tyrese)	Johnson; Guetta; Tuinfort; Riesterer	Guetta; Tuinfort; Riesterer	3:34

Notes

- ^{^[a]} signifies vocal producer
- ^{^[b]} signifies co-producer or additional production by.
- ^{^[r]} signifies remix production by.
- "Sweat" interpolates elements of "Don't You Want Me" (Hooj Remix).
- Daddy's Groove is also credited as Black Raw in the album booklet.
- All songs are published by and copyright of What A Music, except for "Sweat" which was courtesy of Capitol Records.
- Single disc edition releases insert the track "Lunar" after "I Just Wanna F."

== Re-releases ==
=== 2.0 version ===
Nothing but the Beat 2.0

Studio album (reissue) by David Guetta
- Released: 7 September 2012
- Length: 75:22
- Labels: What a Music; Parlophone; EMI
- Producers: David Guetta; Afrojack; Avicii; Mike Caren; Silvio Ecomo; Daddy's Groove; Fabian Lenseen; Frédéric Riesterer; Giorgio Tuinfort; Sandy Vee

Singles from Nothing but the Beat 2.0
- 1. "She Wolf (Falling to Pieces)" Released: 21 August 2012; 2. "Just One Last Time" Released: 15 November 2012; 3. "Play Hard" Released: 15 March 2013

The album's re-release Nothing but the Beat 2.0 was preceded with the release of "She Wolf (Falling to Pieces)", on 21 August 2012 and eventually came out on 19 November 2012. It is Guetta's second collaboration with Sia following "Titanium". A number of remixes of the track were first made available via Beatport on 7 August 2012, with contributors including Michael Calfan and Sandro Silva. The single was later released physically and digitally on 24 August 2012, in the United Kingdom and Germany. The track was officially sent to American radio on 7 January 2013. "Just One Last Time" was released as the album's ninth overall single on 15 November 2012, and the second from the album's re-release. The track itself is a collaboration with Taped Rai. The track was released in the United Kingdom on 31 December 2012, and became only the second single from the album, following on from "I Can Only Imagine", which did not receive an official physical release. The music video was released on 3 December 2012, again directed by Colin Tilley. "Play Hard" featuring Akon and Ne-Yo has been remixed by Guetta, and this new version was released as the tenth and final single from Nothing but the Beat.

On 11 April 2012, Guetta released his collaboration track with Nicky Romero "Metropolis" through Beatport as the first release of his new label Jack Back Records. A shortened edit of the song was later included in Nothing but the Beat 2.0. On 19 October 2012, a video for "Metropolis" was uploaded to YouTube and, as of April 2014, has over 10 million views. The video, a burn production directed by Mr. Brainwash, opens with a television with text on the screen that reads, "art cannot be criticized because every mistake is a new creation", and contains scenes involving paint, graffiti, the breaking of objects, and Guetta and Romero DJing.

Nothing but the Beat 2.0
No.	Title	Writer(s)	Producer(s)	Length
1.	"Titanium" (featuring Sia)	Sia Furler; Guetta; Tuinfort; van de Wall	Guetta; Tuinfort; Afrojack	4:05
2.	"Turn Me On" (featuring Nicki Minaj)	Ester Dean; Guetta; Tuinfort	Guetta; Tuinfort; Daddy's Groove^{[a]}	3:19
3.	"She Wolf (Falling to Pieces)" (featuring Sia)	Guetta; Chris Braide; Sia Furler; Giorgio Tuinfort	Guetta; Tuinfort; Braide	3:42
4.	"Without You" (featuring Usher)	Taio Cruz; Usher Raymond IV; Rico Love; Guetta; Tuinfort; Riesterer	Guetta; Tuinfort; Riesterer; Black Raw^{[a]}	3:28
5.	"I Can Only Imagine" (featuring Chris Brown and Lil Wayne)	Christopher Brown; Dwayne Carter; Jacob Luttrell; Nasri Atweh; Guetta; Tuinfort; Riesterer	Guetta; Riesterer; Daddy's Groove^{[a]}	3:29
6.	"Play Hard" (featuring Ne-Yo and Akon)	Guetta; Aliaune Thiam; Shaffer Smith; Tuinfort; Riesterer; Sebastiaan Molijn; Eelke Kalberg	Guetta; Tuinfort; Riesterer	3:29
7.	"Wild One Two" (edit; Jack Back featuring David Guetta, Nicky Romero and Sia)	Guetta; Romero; Tramar Dillard; Raphaël Judrin; Pierre-Antoine Melki; Sia Furler; Axwell; Jacob Luttrell; Marcus Cooper; Benjamin Maddahi	Guetta; Romero; soFLY & Nius; Axwell	3:09
8.	"Just One Last Time" (featuring Taped Rai)	Guetta; Tuinfort; Tom Liljegren; Alexander Ryberg	Guetta; Tuinfort	3:47
9.	"In My Head" (with Daddy's Groove featuring Nervo)	Carlo Grieco; Daddy's Groove; Guetta; Giovanni Romano	Daddy's Groove; Guetta	3:51
10.	"Where Them Girls At" (featuring Flo Rida and Nicki Minaj)	Tramar Dillard; Onika Maraj; Juan Silinas; Oscar Silinas; Jared Cotter; Michael Caren; David Guetta; Giorgio Tuinfort; Sandy Vee	Guetta; Vee; Caren	3:16
11.	"Little Bad Girl" (featuring Taio Cruz and Ludacris)	Taio Cruz; Christopher Bridges; Guetta; Tuinfort; Frédéric Riesterer	Guetta; Tuinfort; Riesterer; Daddy's Groove^{[a]}	3:11
12.	"Sweat" (vs. Snoop Dogg)	Calvin Broadus; Cheri Williams; Derek Jenkins; Dwayne Richardson; Cassio Ware; David Singer-Vine; Niles Hollowell-Dhar; Guetta; Tuinfort; Riesterer	Guetta; Tuinfort; Riesterer	3:16
13.	"Crank It Up" (featuring Akon)	Aliaune Thiam; Guetta; Tuinfort; Riesterer	Guetta; Tuinfort; Riesterer; Fabian Lenseen^{[a]}; Silvio Ecomo^{[a]}	3:12
14.	"Nothing Really Matters" (featuring will.i.am)	William Adams; Guetta; Tuinfort; Riesterer; Pierre-Luc Rioux	Guetta; Tuinfort; Riesterer	3:39
15.	"Every Chance We Get We Run" (with Alesso featuring Tegan & Sara)	Tegan Quin; Sara Quin; Guetta; Giorgio Tuinfort; Frédéric Riesterer; Alesso	Alesso; Guetta; Riesterer; Tuinfort	4:00
16.	"Sunshine" (edit; with Avicii)	Guetta; Giorgio Tuinfort; Tim Bergling	David Guetta; Giorgio Tuinfort; Tim Bergling	3:52
17.	"Lunar" (edit; with Afrojack)	Guetta; Nick van de Wall; Giorgio Tuinfort	David Guetta; Nick van de Wall	3:10
18.	"What the F***"	Guetta; Frédéric Riesterer	David Guetta; Frédéric Riesterer	4:07
19.	"Metropolis" (edit; with Nicky Romero)	Guetta; Giorgio Tuinfort	David Guetta; Giorgio Tuinfort; Nicky Romero	3:10
20.	"The Alphabeat"	Guetta; Giorgio Tuinfort	David Guetta; Giorgio Tuinfort; Daddy's Groove^{[a]}	4:29
21.	"Toy Story"	Guetta; Giorgio Tuinfort	David Guetta; Giorgio Tuinfort	3:45
Total length:				65:00

=== Ultimate version ===
Nothing but the Beat: Ultimate – Disc 1
No.	Title	Writer(s)	Producer(s)	Length
1.	"Titanium" (featuring Sia)	Sia Furler; Guetta; Tuinfort; van de Wall	Guetta; Tuinfort; Afrojack	4:05
2.	"Turn Me On" (featuring Nicki Minaj)	Ester Dean; Guetta; Tuinfort	Guetta; Tuinfort; Daddy's Groove^{[b]}	3:19
3.	"She Wolf (Falling to Pieces)" (featuring Sia)	Guetta; Chris Braide; Sia Furler; Giorgio Tuinfort	Guetta; Tuinfort	3:42
4.	"Without You" (featuring Usher)	Usher Raymond IV; Cruz; Rico Love; Guetta; Tuinfort; Riesterer	Guetta; Tuinfort; Riesterer; Daddy's Groove^{[b]}	3:28
5.	"I Can Only Imagine" (featuring Chris Brown and Lil Wayne)	Christopher Brown; Dwayne Carter; Jacob Luttrell; Nasri Atweh; Guetta; Tuinfort; Riesterer	Guetta; Riesterer; Daddy's Groove^{[b]}	3:29
6.	"Play Hard" (featuring Ne-Yo and Akon)	Guetta; Aliaune Thiam; Shaffer Smith; Tuinfort; Riesterer; Sebastiaan Molijn; Eelke Kalberg	Guetta; Tuinfort; Riesterer	3:21
7.	"Wild One Two" (Jack Back featuring David Guetta, Nicky Romero and Sia)	Guetta; Romero; Tramar Dillard; Raphaël Judrin; Pierre-Antoine Melki; Sia Furler; Axwell; Jacob Luttrell; Marcus Cooper; Benjamin Maddahi	Guetta; Romero; soFLY & Nius; Axwell	3:09
8.	"Just One Last Time" (featuring Taped Rai)	Guetta; Tuinfort; Tom Liljegren; Alexander Ryberg	Guetta; Tuinfort	3:47
9.	"In My Head" (with Daddy's Groove featuring Nervo)	Carlo Grieco; Daddy's Groove; Guetta; Giovanni Romano	Daddy's Groove; Guetta	3:51
10.	"Where Them Girls At" (featuring Flo Rida and Nicki Minaj)	Tramar Dillard; Onika Maraj; Juan Silinas; Oscar Silinas; Jared Cotter; Michael Caren; David Guetta; Giorgio Tuinfort; Sandy Vee	Guetta; Vee; Caren	3:14
11.	"Little Bad Girl" (featuring Taio Cruz and Ludacris)	Taio Cruz; Christopher Bridges; Guetta; Tuinfort; Frédéric Riesterer	Guetta; Tuinfort; Riesterer; Daddy's Groove^{[b]}	3:11
12.	"Sweat" (vs. Snoop Dogg)	Calvin Broadus; Cheri Williams; Derek Jenkins; Dwayne Richardson; Cassio Ware; David Singer-Vine; Niles Hollowell-Dhar; Guetta; Tuinfort; Riesterer	Guetta; Tuinfort; Riesterer	3:16
13.	"Crank It Up" (featuring Akon)	Aliaune Thiam; Guetta; Tuinfort; Riesterer	Guetta; Tuinfort; Riesterer; Fabian Lenseen^{[b]}; Silvio Ecomo^{[b]}	3:12
14.	"I Just Wanna F." (with Afrojack featuring Timbaland and Dev)	Jacob Luttrell; Amy Kaup; Jessica Sarangay; Singer-Vine & Hollowell-Dhar/The Cataracs; KSHMR; Guetta; Nick van de Wall	Guetta; Afrojack	3:23
15.	"Nothing Really Matters" (featuring will.i.am)	William Adams; Guetta; Tuinfort; Riesterer; Pierre-Luc Rioux	Guetta; Tuinfort; Riesterer	3:39
16.	"Night of Your Life" (featuring Jennifer Hudson)	Crystal Johnson; Anthony Preston; Guetta; Tuinfort	Guetta; Tuinfort	3:41
17.	"Repeat" (featuring Jessie J)	Jessica Cornish; The Invisible Men; Ali Tennant; Guetta; Tuinfort; Riesterer	Guetta; Tuinfort; Riesterer	3:26

Nothing but the Beat: Ultimate – Disc 2
No.	Title	Writer(s)	Producer(s)	Length
1.	"Every Chance We Get We Run" (with Alesso featuring Tegan & Sara)	Guetta; Giorgio Tuinfort; Frédéric Riesterer; Alesso; Sara Quin; Tegan Quin	Guetta; Alesso; Riesterer; Tuinfort	4:00
2.	"Sunshine" (with Avicii)	Guetta; Giorgio Tuinfort; Tim Bergling	David Guetta; Giorgio Tuinfort; Tim Bergling	6:01
3.	"Lunar" (with Afrojack)	Guetta; Nick van de Wall; Giorgio Tuinfort	David Guetta; Nick van de Wall	5:16
4.	"What the F***"	Guetta; Frédéric Riesterer	David Guetta; Frédéric Riesterer	4:07
5.	"Metropolis" (with Nicky Romero)	Guetta; Giorgio Tuinfort	David Guetta; Giorgio Tuinfort; Nicky Romero	6:13
6.	"The Alphabeat"	Guetta; Giorgio Tuinfort	David Guetta; Giorgio Tuinfort; Daddy's Groove^{[b]}	4:29
7.	"Metro Music"	Guetta; Giorgio Tuinfort	David Guetta; Giorgio Tuinfort	4:13
8.	"Toy Story"	Guetta; Giorgio Tuinfort	David Guetta; Giorgio Tuinfort	3:44
9.	"The Future" (with Afrojack)	Guetta; Nick van de Wall	David Guetta; Nick van de Wall	4:16
10.	"Dreams"	Guetta; Giorgio Tuinfort; Frédéric Riesterer	David Guetta; Frédéric Riesterer; Giorgio Tuinfort	4:48
11.	"Paris"	Guetta; Frédéric Riesterer	David Guetta; Frédéric Riesterer	4:40
12.	"Glasgow"	Guetta; Giorgio Tuinfort	David Guetta; Giorgio Tuinfort; Daddy's Groove^{[b]}	5:13
13.	"Little Bad Girl" (Instrumental Club Mix)	Guetta; Tuinfort; Frédéric Riesterer; Taio Cruz; Christopher Bridges	Guetta; Tuinfort; Riesterer; Daddy's Groove^{[b]}	5:12

Notes

- ^{^[a]} signifies vocal producer
- ^{^[b]} denotes additional production.
- "Play Hard" samples from "Better Off Alone", written by Sebastiaan Molijn and Eelke Kalberg and performed by Alice Deejay.
- Credits adapted from album liner notes.
- Daddy's Groove is also credited as Black Raw (Black Raw a.k.a Daddy's Groove) in the album credits.

== Documentary ==
A feature-length biographical documentary about Guetta was released on 1 September 2011. Also named "Nothing but the Beat", the documentary follows Guetta on tour around the world and behind the scenes of major concerts, featuring interviews with collaborative and associated artists, friends, colleagues, and his wife to chronicle his rise from underground house DJ to global superstar. It was produced alongside the energy drink brand Burn. Featured artists include will.i.am, Kelly Rowland, Snoop Dogg, Ludacris, Taio Cruz, and dance music legends Fatboy Slim, David Morales, and Pete Tong, plus new talent Afrojack and Avicii. The film received its official premiere at Paris' largest operating movie theatre Le Grand Rex, where it played to over 2,000 fans and guests. Others involved in the production of the documentary included What a Music, Pardeep Sall (Trouble Makers Associates), filmmakers Partizan and innovation house Deviant Venture, and was released as a free podcast on iTunes.

== Charts ==
=== Weekly charts ===
==== Original version ====
Chart (2011–2014)	Peak position
Australian Albums (ARIA)	3
Australian Dance Albums (ARIA)	1
Austrian Albums (Ö3 Austria)	3
Belgian Albums (Ultratop Flanders)	2
Belgian Albums (Ultratop Wallonia)	1
Canadian Albums (Billboard)	2
Danish Albums (Hitlisten)	14
Dutch Albums (Album Top 100)	3
Finnish Albums (Suomen virallinen lista)	7
French Albums (SNEP)	1
German Albums (Offizielle Top 100)	1
Greek Albums (IFPI)	4
Hungarian Albums (MAHASZ)	8
Irish Albums (IRMA)	2
Italian Albums (FIMI)	4
Japanese Albums (Oricon)	3
Mexican Albums (AMPROFON)	3
New Zealand Albums (RMNZ)	3
Norwegian Albums (VG-lista)	5
Polish Albums (ZPAV)	8
Portuguese Albums (AFP)	1
Scottish Albums (Official Charts)	1
Slovenian Albums (IFPI)	7
South African Albums (RISA)	4
Spanish Albums (Promusicae)	1
Swedish Albums (Sverigetopplistan)	19
Swiss Albums (Schweizer Hitparade)	1
UK Albums (Official Charts)	2
UK Dance Albums (Official Charts)	1
US Billboard 200	5
US Top Dance Albums (Billboard)	1

==== Ultimate version ====
Chart (2012)	Peak position
Australian Albums (ARIA)	25
French Albums (SNEP)	85
New Zealand Albums (RMNZ)	21

==== Ultimate + One More Love ====
Chart (2013)	Peak position
French Albums (SNEP)	165

==== The Electronic Album ====
Chart (2012)	Peak position
US Billboard 200	163
US Top Dance Albums (Billboard)	12

==== 2.0 version ====
Chart (2012–2025)	Peak position
Australian Albums (ARIA)	24
Austrian Albums (Ö3 Austria)	49
Finnish Albums (Suomen virallinen lista)	37
French Albums (SNEP)	35
Norwegian Albums (VG-lista)	21
Scottish Albums (Official Charts)	10
Swedish Albums (Sverigetopplistan)	9
Swiss Albums (Schweizer Hitparade)	39
UK Albums (Official Charts)	13

=== Year-end charts ===
==== Original version ====
Chart (2011)	Position
Australian Albums (ARIA)	14
Austrian Albums (Ö3 Austria)	6
Belgian Albums (Ultratop Flanders)	22
Belgian Albums (Ultratop Wallonia)	10
Canadian Albums (Billboard)	37
Dutch Albums (Album Top 100)	22
French Albums (SNEP)	8
German Albums (Offizielle Top 100)	12
Hungarian Albums (MAHASZ)	43
Spanish Albums (PROMUSICAE)	19
Swiss Albums (Schweizer Hitparade)	5
UK Albums (OCC)	41
US Top Dance/Electronic Albums (Billboard)	7

Chart (2012)	Position
Australian Albums (ARIA)	51
Austrian Albums (Ö3 Austria)	9
Belgian Albums (Ultratop Flanders)	18
Belgian Albums (Ultratop Wallonia)	16
Dutch Albums (Album Top 100)	39
French Albums (SNEP)	24
German Albums (Offizielle Top 100)	24
Hungarian Albums (MAHASZ)	47
Italian Albums (FIMI)	43
Mexican Albums (AMPROFON)	35
Spanish Albums (PROMUSICAE)	26
Swiss Albums (Schweizer Hitparade)	13
UK Albums (OCC)	21
US Billboard 200	102
US Top Dance/Electronic Albums (Billboard)	5

Chart (2013)	Position
Austrian Albums (Ö3 Austria)	75
Swiss Albums (Schweizer Hitparade)	36
UK Albums (OCC)	43
US Top Dance/Electronic Albums (Billboard)	8

Chart (2017)	Position
US Top Dance/Electronic Albums (Billboard)	18

Chart (2018)	Position
US Top Dance/Electronic Albums (Billboard)	12

Chart (2019)	Position
US Top Dance/Electronic Albums (Billboard)	17

Chart (2020)	Position
US Top Dance/Electronic Albums (Billboard)	15

Chart (2021)	Position
Belgian Albums (Ultratop Flanders)	191
US Top Dance/Electronic Albums (Billboard)	13

Chart (2022)	Position
US Top Dance/Electronic Albums (Billboard)	12

Chart (2023)	Position
US Top Dance/Electronic Albums (Billboard)	12

Chart (2024)	Position
Belgian Albums (Ultratop Flanders)	186
US Top Dance/Electronic Albums (Billboard)	15

Chart (2025)	Position
Belgian Albums (Ultratop Flanders)	147
Belgian Albums (Ultratop Wallonia)	194
US Top Dance Albums (Billboard)	16

==== Ultimate version ====
Chart (2012)	Position
Australian Albums (ARIA)	89

==== 2.0 version ====
Chart (2013)	Position
Austrian Albums (Ö3 Austria)	75

Chart (2025)	Position
Swiss Albums (Schweizer Hitparade)	74

=== Decade-end charts ===
Chart (2010–2019)	Position
Australian Albums (ARIA)	87
UK Albums (OCC)	60

== Certifications ==
Region	Certification	Certified units/sales
Australia (ARIA)	2× Platinum	140,000^{^}
Austria (IFPI Austria)	2× Platinum	40,000^{*}
Belgium (BRMA)	Platinum	30,000^{*}
Canada (Music Canada)	2× Platinum	160,000^{^}
Denmark (IFPI Danmark)	3× Platinum	60,000^{‡}
Finland (Musiikkituottajat)	Gold	14,644
France (SNEP)	Diamond	500,000^{*}
Germany (BVMI)	3× Platinum	600,000^{‡}
Hungary (MAHASZ)	Gold	3,000^{^}
Ireland (IRMA)	Platinum	15,000^{^}
Italy (FIMI)	2× Platinum	100,000^{‡}
Mexico (AMPROFON)	Platinum	60,000^{^}
Netherlands (NVPI)	Platinum	50,000^{^}
New Zealand (RMNZ)	Gold	7,500^{^}
Poland (ZPAV)	Gold	10,000^{*}
Portugal (AFP)	Platinum	7,000^{‡}
Russia (NFPF)	Gold	5,000^{*}
Spain (Promusicae)	Platinum	60,000^{^}
Switzerland (IFPI Switzerland)	2× Platinum	60,000^{^}
United Kingdom (BPI)	4× Platinum	1,200,000^{‡}
United States (RIAA)	Gold	500,000^{^}
Summaries
Europe (IFPI)	Platinum	1,000,000^{*}
^{*} Sales figures based on certification alone.^{^} Shipments figures based on certification alone.^{‡} Sales+streaming figures based on certification alone.

== Release history ==
Country	Date	Format	Label	Edition
Australia	26 August 2011	CD; digital download	EMI	Standard edition
United States	26 August 2011		EMI	Standard edition
United States	26 August 2011		EMI	Standard edition
Germany	26 August 2011	LP; CD; digital download	EMI	Standard edition
Ireland	26 August 2011	CD; digital download	EMI	Standard edition
India	26 August 2011	CD		Standard edition
Netherlands	26 August 2011	LP; CD; digital download		Standard edition
Japan	29 August 2011	CD	What a Music	Standard edition
Denmark	29 August 2011	CD	EMI	Standard edition
Canada	29 August 2011	CD	EMI	Standard edition
Poland	29 August 2011	LP; CD	EMI	Standard edition
France	29 August 2011	LP; CD	Virgin; EMI	Standard edition
Italy	30 August 2011	LP; CD	EMI	Standard edition
United States	30 August 2011	CD	Astralwerks	Standard edition (US version)
Brazil	31 August 2011	CD	EMI	Standard edition; deluxe edition
Germany	25 November 2011	CD	EMI	Deluxe edition
Australia	25 November 2011	CD	EMI	Deluxe edition
United Kingdom	27 November 2011	CD	Positiva	Standard Edition; Deluxe Edition
Denmark	30 November 2011	CD	EMI	Deluxe edition
Germany	7 September 2012	CD; digital download	Virgin; EMI	Nothing but the Beat 2.0
United Kingdom	10 September 2012	CD; digital download	Virgin; EMI	Nothing but the Beat 2.0
Poland	10 September 2012	CD; digital download	EMI	Nothing but the Beat 2.0
United States	10 September 2012	CD; digital download	Capitol	Nothing but the Beat 2.0
Germany	7 December 2012	CD; digital download	Virgin	Nothing but the Beat Ultimate
