= Alphabeat (disambiguation) =

Alphabeat are a Danish pop band.

Alphabeat may also refer to:

- Alphabeat (album), self-titled album by Alphabeat
- "The Alphabeat" (song), song by David Guetta
