= Sunshine (David Guetta and Avicii song) =

Song by Avicii and David Guetta

from the album Nothing but the Beat
- Released: August 23, 2011; 15 years ago
- Recorded: 2011
- Genre: House; progressive house
- Length: 6:01
- Label: EMI
- Songwriters: David Guetta; Giorgio Tuinfort; Avicii
- Producers: David Guetta; Giorgio Tuinfort; Avicii

Audio
- "Sunshine" on YouTube

"Sunshine" is a song produced by French DJ David Guetta and Swedish DJ Avicii, from Guetta's fifth studio album, Nothing but the Beat. It peaked on the Swedish Charts at number 59.

It was nominated for a Grammy Award for Best Dance Recording in February 2012 but lost to "Scary Monsters And Nice Sprites" by Skrillex.

== Background ==
"Sunshine" is a progressive house song written in the key of C♯ minor. It follows the chord progression of C♯m/B/E-A/B/C♯ and runs at 128 bpm. It was released in August 2011.

== Track listing ==
Digital download
No.	Title	Length
1.	"Sunshine"	6:01

== Credits and personnel ==
Credits adapted from the liner notes for Nothing but the Beat.

- David Guetta – songwriting, production, mixing
- Tim Bergling (Avicii)– songwriting, production, mixing
- Giorgio Tuinfort – songwriting, production

== Charts ==
Chart (2011–12)	Peak position
Sweden (Sverigetopplistan)	59
