= Max Elto =

Swedish vocal duo

- Also known as: Taped Rai (former name)
- Origin: Sweden
- Years active: 2012—present
- Labels: Big Beat
- Members: Tom Liljegren; Alexander Ryberg

Max Elto, formerly known as Taped Rai, is a Swedish vocal duo consisting of Tom Liljegren and Alexander Ryberg. They are best known for providing vocals for David Guetta's single "Just One Last Time" and releasing their 2013 debut single "Shadow of the Sun".

== Career ==
=== 2012—2014: Beginnings as Taped Rai ===
The duo was formed of Tom Liljegren and Alexander Ryberg and first got together in mid-2012. After working and practising as a vocalist group, they were signed by American and British music label Big Beat Records.

The duo were later inspired as they went on to collaborate with other big names in the music industry. Their debut performance was with David Guetta, featuring vocals on his 2012 single "Just One Last Time" which later appeared on his eighth studio album Nothing But the Beat and its later versions Nothing but the Beat 2.0 and Nothing but the Beat: Ultimate. The featured single later peaked at number 20 in the UK singles chart.

In 2013, the duo produced and released their debut single "Shadow Of The Sun". They followed up with single "Backyard Animals", which came out later in the same year.

=== 2014—2015: Rebranding as Max Elto ===
The duo, after releasing two singles in 2013, decided that they needed to change and re-invent themselves and, as of 2014, they were officially known as Max Elto.

This led onto their digital and social media expansion, together with the major improvement of their Facebook page. Both of their singles "Shadow Of The Sun" and "Backyard Animals" were re-released under their new name with music videos for each and at the same time, they announced the songs under their 2014 debut extended play, self-titled Taped Rai which was released shortly afterwards.

After releasing their debut EP, they released the music video for their third single, titled "Daniel", and released "Citylights", both of which were songs off of their EP.

Approaching the end of 2014, they announced the release of their first non-EP song which was titled "Somebody Like You". It was released in early 2015. Towards the middle of 2015, "Citylights" was released officially with a music video.

=== 2015—present: Temporary split and solo careers ===
Ever since the release of their single "Citylights", the duo have decided that they needed to grow as solo artists and then reunite after their individual popularity increases. They introduced their solo stage names: Tom Taped (Tom Liljegren) and Alex Aris (Alexander Ryberg). Since then, the two have been working independently with different artists.

In early 2016, Tom Taped was signed under Armada Music and released his debut solo single, titled "It Doesn't Matter". Alex Aris later followed with his solo debut as a featured artist, with his vocals placed alongside Enya in Salvatore Ganacci's single, "Dive".

== Discography: Taped Rai / Max Elto ==
=== EPs ===
- Taped Rai (2014)

=== Singles ===
As lead artist

Single	Year	Album
"Shadow of the Sun"	2013	Taped Rai EP
"Backyard Animals"	2013	Taped Rai EP
"Daniel"	2014	Taped Rai EP
"Somebody Like You"	2015	Non-album single
"Citylights"	2015	Taped Rai EP

As featured artist

List of singles, with selected chart positions and certifications, showing year released and album name
Year	Title	Peak chart positions										Album
Year	Title	AUS	AUT	FRA	GER	IRE	NLD	NZ	SPA	SWI	UK	Album
2012	"Just One Last Time" (David Guetta featuring Taped Rai)	82	31	14	45	16	100	24	25	44	20	Nothing but the Beat 2.0

== Discography: Alex Aris ==
as lead artist

Single	Year	Album
"Wrong Love"	2018	Non-album single
"Can You Feel It"	2018	Non-album single
"Lover" (with Otto Knows and Dice Of Nights)	2022	Non-album single
"Randomizer" (with Otto Knows)	2022	Non-album single
"Love Is Gone" (with 22Bullets)	2023	Life Begins After Dark
"Be Somebody" (with Otto Knows)	2023	Non-album single

as featured artist

Single	Year	Album
"Dying For You" (Otto Knows featuring Lindsey Stirling and Alex Aris)	2016	Non-album single
"Stockholm Skies" (Steve Angello featuring Tom Taped and Alex Aris)	2016	Wild Youth
"Dive" (Salvatore Ganacci featuring Enya and Alex Aris)	2016	Non-album single
"Mistaken" (Martin Garrix and Matisse & Sadko featuring Alex Aris)	2019	Non-album single
"Heal Me" (Matisse & Sadko featuring Alex Aris)	2021	Non-album single
"Dawn" (Matisse & Sadko featuring Alex Aris)	2021	Non-album single
"Electricity" (DubVision and Otto Knows featuring Alex Aris)	2022	Non-album single

== Discography: Tom Taped ==
as lead artist

Single	Year	Album
"It Doesn't Matter"	2016	Non-album singles
"Felice"	2017	Non-album singles
"I Notice U"	2017	Non-album singles

as featured artist

Single	Year	Album
"Stockholm Skies" (Steve Angello featuring Tom Taped and Alex Aris)	2016	Wild Youth
