= She Wolf (Falling to Pieces) =

2012 single by David Guetta

Single by David Guetta featuring Sia

from the album Nothing but the Beat 2.0
- Released: 21 August 2012
- Genre: Electro House
- Length: 3:42
- Label: Virgin; EMI
- Songwriters: David Guetta; Chris Braide; Sia Furler; Giorgio Tuinfort
- Producers: David Guetta; Chris Braide; Giorgio Tuinfort

David Guetta singles chronology
"Laserlight" (2012)	"She Wolf (Falling to Pieces)" (2012)	"Rest of My Life" (2012)

Sia singles chronology
"Wild Ones" (2011)	"She Wolf (Falling to Pieces)" (2012)	"Elastic Heart" (2013)

Audio sample
- "She Wolf": file; help

Music video
- "She Wolf (Falling to Pieces)" on YouTube

"She Wolf (Falling to Pieces)" is a song by French DJ and music producer David Guetta, featuring vocals from Australian singer Sia. It was released as the lead single from the re-release of Nothing But the Beat, Nothing But the Beat 2.0 and tallies as the album's eighth single overall. It was released via digital download on August 21, 2012.

== Background ==
Prior to its official release on August 21, 2012, an EP of remixes of the track, featuring contributions from Michael Calingham and Sandro Silva, was made available for a short time exclusively via Beatport, on August 7, 2012. The official release then followed on August 21, 2012, before the track was issued in the form of CD single and 12" vinyl in Germany on August 24, 2012. The single was released in the United Kingdom on September 10, 2012, on the date of the album's release. It peaked at #8 on the UK Singles Chart. Although this song failed to chart the US Billboard Hot 100, it topped the Billboard Hot Dance Club Songs chart, making it Guetta's seventh number-one on the chart.

== Music video ==
=== Background ===
On September 21, 2012, a lyric video for the track was uploaded to Guetta's official VEVO channel. On September 26, 2012, a trailer for the music video was released, with an official premiere date of October 3, 2012, revealed. The official video for the track was uploaded to Guetta's official VEVO channel five days earlier on September 28, 2012.

=== Synopsis ===
Example of the effects used during the video. This is an image of one of the hunters exploding.

The video starts off with a shot of a naked woman, which moves on to a wounded wolf running from a handful of human hunters. It is shown that the wolf is supernatural, as it is able to make the hunters "explode" on every breakdown of the song. The "explosions" depict the hunters and the landscape as composed by tiny polygons. At the end of the music video, the canine then transforms back into the naked woman at the start.

=== Location ===
The video was shot on-location in Iceland, at Langjökull, and at Reykjanes, in Krýsuvík and near Reykjanesviti.

The music video, in France, was broadcast with a warning Not advised for kids under 10 years (in French : déconseillé aux moins de 10 ans) following explosion scenes, blood, violence and nudity than its content, although some channels broadcast it only blurring or without blurring and without warning.

== Critical reception ==
Robert Copsey of Digital Spy gave the song a mixed review stating:

After a global conquering hook-up with Flo Rida she's returned to where it all began with David Guetta, who'll be hoping that lightning strikes twice after the spectacular and chart-topping 'Titanium'. Once again, it's the heartfelt lyrics that shine over the handbag house as she confesses: "You hunted me down like a wolf, a predator/ ...I felt like a deer in your lights" with the same inimitable gusto. The result is nothing we haven't heard already, but that's not necessarily a bad thing.

== Track listing ==
Digital download
No.	Title	Length
1.	"She Wolf" (Falling to Pieces)	3:30

Digital download – EP
No.	Title	Length
1.	"She Wolf" (Falling to Pieces) (Michael Calfan Remix)	6:00
2.	"She Wolf" (Falling to Pieces) (Sandro Silva Remix)	4:47
3.	"She Wolf" (Falling to Pieces) (Extended Mix)	4:59

CD single
No.	Title	Length
1.	"She Wolf" (Falling to Pieces) (Michael Calfan Remix)	6:00
2.	"She Wolf" (Falling to Pieces) (Sandro Silva Remix)	4:47
3.	"She Wolf" (Falling to Pieces) (extended mix)	4:59
4.	"She Wolf" (Falling to Pieces) (album version)	3:42

German 12" vinyl
No.	Title	Length
1.	"She Wolf" (Falling to Pieces) (Michael Calfan Remix)	6:00
2.	"She Wolf" (Falling to Pieces) (extended mix)	4:59
3.	"She Wolf" (Falling to Pieces) (Sandro Silva Remix)	4:47

== Charts ==
=== Weekly charts ===
Weekly chart performance for "She Wolf (Falling to Pieces)"
Chart (2012–13)	Peak position
Australia (ARIA)	11
Austria (Ö3 Austria Top 40)	3
Belgium (Ultratop 50 Flanders)	7
Belgium (Ultratop 50 Wallonia)	5
Brazil (Billboard Hot 100 Airplay)	43
Brazil (Brasil Hot Pop Billboard)	12
Canada Hot 100 (Billboard)	35
Czech Republic Airplay (ČNS IFPI)	4
Denmark (Tracklisten)	7
Finland (Suomen virallinen lista)	5
France (SNEP)	4
Germany (GfK)	3
Hungary (Dance Top 40)	11
Hungary (Rádiós Top 40)	14
Hungary (Single Top 40)	1
Iceland (Tonlist)	16
Ireland (IRMA)	6
Israel International Airplay (Media Forest)	2
Italy (FIMI)	6
Japan Hot 100 (Billboard)	80
Lebanon (The Official Lebanese Top 20)	13
Luxembourg (Billboard)	5
Netherlands (Dutch Top 40)	6
Netherlands (Single Top 100)	6
New Zealand (Recorded Music NZ)	19
Norway (VG-lista)	4
Portugal (Billboard)	4
Romania (Romanian Top 100)	94
Russia Airplay (TopHit)	4
Scottish Singles Sales (Official Charts)	4
Slovakia Airplay (ČNS IFPI)	5
Spain (PROMUSICAE)	13
Sweden (Sverigetopplistan)	6
Switzerland (Schweizer Hitparade)	4
UK Dance (Official Charts)	1
UK Singles (Official Charts)	8
Ukraine Airplay (TopHit)	48
US Hot Dance/Electronic Songs (Billboard)	8
US Dance Club Songs (Billboard)	1
Venezuela (Record Report)	93

=== Year-end charts ===
2012 year-end chart performance for "She Wolf (Falling to Pieces)"
Chart (2012)	Position
Australia (ARIA)	58
Austria (Ö3 Austria Top 40)	34
Belgium (Ultratop Flanders)	48
Belgium (Ultratop Wallonia)	38
France (SNEP)	31
Germany (Media Control AG)	27
Hungary (Dance Top 40)	48
Hungary (Rádiós Top 40)	82
Italy (FIMI)	29
Netherlands (Dutch Top 40)	29
Netherlands (Single Top 100)	45
Russia Airplay (TopHit)	134
Sweden (Sverigetopplistan)	32
Switzerland (Schweizer Hitparade)	46
UK Singles (OCC)	91

2013 year-end chart performance for "She Wolf (Falling to Pieces)"
Chart (2013)	Position
France (SNEP)	153
Italy (Musica e dischi)	72
Netherlands (Dutch Top 40)	135
Russia Airplay (TopHit)	23
Sweden (Sverigetopplistan)	77
Ukraine Airplay (TopHit)	80
US Hot Dance/Electronic Songs (Billboard)	41

== Certifications ==
Certifications and sales for "She Wolf (Falling to Pieces)"
Region	Certification	Certified units/sales
Australia (ARIA)	2× Platinum	140,000^{^}
Austria (IFPI Austria)	Gold	15,000^{*}
Belgium (BRMA)	Gold	15,000^{*}
Brazil (Pro-Música Brasil)	Gold	30,000^{‡}
Denmark (IFPI Danmark)	Gold	15,000^{^}
France (SNEP)	Gold	75,000^{*}
Germany (BVMI)	Gold	281,000
Italy (FIMI)	2× Platinum	60,000^{*}
New Zealand (RMNZ)	Gold	7,500^{*}
Spain (Promusicae)	Gold	30,000^{‡}
Switzerland (IFPI Switzerland)	Platinum	30,000^{^}
United Kingdom (BPI)	Platinum	600,000^{‡}
Streaming
Denmark (IFPI Danmark)	2× Platinum	3,600,000^{†}
^{*} Sales figures based on certification alone.^{^} Shipments figures based on certification alone.^{‡} Sales+streaming figures based on certification alone.^{†} Streaming-only figures based on certification alone.

== Release history ==
Release dates for "She Wolf (Falling to Pieces)"
Region	Date	Format	Label
France	August 21, 2012	Digital download	EMI
Norway	August 21, 2012	Digital download	EMI
United States	August 21, 2012	Digital download	EMI
Germany	August 24, 2012	CD single; 12" vinyl	EMI
France	September 3, 2012	CD single; 12" vinyl	EMI
Italy	September 9, 2012	CD single; 12" vinyl	EMI
United Kingdom	September 10, 2012	CD single; 12" vinyl	EMI
United States	January 8, 2013	Mainstream radio	Astralwerks; Capitol

== See also ==
- List of number-one dance singles of 2012 (U.S.)
