= The Alphabeat (song) =

Single by David Guetta

from the album Nothing but the Beat
- Released: 26 March 2012
- Genre: Electro house; electronic rock
- Length: 4:29
- Label: Virgin; EMI
- Songwriters: David Guetta; Giorgio Tuinfort
- Producers: David Guetta; Giorgio Tuinfort; Black Raw

David Guetta singles chronology
"Wild One Two" (2012)	"The Alphabeat" (2012)	"I Can Only Imagine" (2012)

"The Alphabeat" is an instrumental song performed by French DJ David Guetta from his fifth studio album, Nothing but the Beat (2011). The song was written by Guetta and Giorgio Tuinfort, whilst production of the song was helmed by Guetta, Tuinfort and Black Raw. "The Alphabeat" was released digitally on 26 Mar 2012, as the fourth promotional single from the album, following "Titanium", "Lunar" and "Night of Your Life", which were released as part of iTunes' countdown to the release of the album. "The Alphabeat" was released as a post-album promotional single, aimed at promoting the release of the Electronic Album in the United States.

== Music video ==
The music video for "The Alphabeat" was directed by So Me. The video was uploaded to Guetta's official YouTube account on April 2, 2012. It features many shots of the Renault Twizy, with the music video serving as a commercial for the car itself. The video features a cameo appearance by Guetta's former wife, Cathy Guetta.

== Track listing ==
Digital download
No.	Title	Length
1.	"The Alphabeat" (Radio Edit)	3:25
2.	"The Alphabeat" (Original Mix)	4:29

== Credits and personnel ==
Credits adapted from the liner notes for Nothing but the Beat.

- David Guetta – songwriting, production
- Giorgio Tuinfort – songwriting, production
- Black Raw – production

== Charts ==
Weekly chart performance for "The Alphabeat"
Chart (2012)	Peak position
Austria (Ö3 Austria Top 40)	57
Belgium (Ultratip Bubbling Under Flanders)	22
Belgium (Ultratip Bubbling Under Wallonia)	40
France (SNEP)	44
Germany (GfK)	85
Italy (FIMI)	37
Netherlands (Dance Top 30)	14
Netherlands (Single Top 100)	88
