= Play Hard =

Single by David Guetta featuring Ne-Yo and Akon

from the album Nothing but the Beat 2.0
- Released: 15 March 2013
- Recorded: 1 September 2012
- Genre: Electro house; dance-pop; hip house
- Length: 3:21; 3:28 (new edit)
- Label: Virgin; EMI France; Parlophone
- Songwriters: Shaffer Smith; Aliaune Thiam; David Guetta; Frédéric Riesterer; Giorgio Tuinfort; Sebastiaan Molijn; Eelke Kalberg
- Producers: David Guetta; Giorgio Tuinfort; Frédéric Riesterer

David Guetta singles chronology
"Just One Last Time" (2012)	"Play Hard" (2013)	"Right Now" (2013)

Ne-Yo singles chronology
"Forever Now" (2012)	"Play Hard" (2012)	"Tonight" (2013)

Akon singles chronology
"Like Money" (2012)	"Play Hard" (2012)	"Interstellar" (2015)

Music video
- "Play Hard" on YouTube

Audio sample
- 13 second sample from David Guetta's "Play Hard": file; help

"Play Hard" is a song by French DJ and record producer David Guetta featuring vocals from American singers Ne-Yo and Akon. It was released on 15 March 2013 as the third single from the 2012 re-release of Guetta's fifth studio album, Nothing but the Beat (2011). This is the third collaboration between Guetta and Akon since "Sexy Bitch" in 2009 and "Crank It Up" in 2011. All three artists co-wrote the song along with Frédéric Riesterer and Giorgio Tuinfort, both of whom produced the song with Guetta. It features a prominent synthesizer riff sampled from the 1998 song "Better Off Alone" by Dutch Eurodance project Alice Deejay; as a result, Sebastiaan Molijn and Eelke Kalberg are credited as songwriters.

"Play Hard" peaked at number six on the UK Singles Chart, thus becoming his fourteenth top 10 hit in the UK as a lead artist. It also charted within the top 10 of the charts in several other countries including Austria, Belgium, Czech Republic, France, Germany, Ireland, Israel, Italy, Luxembourg, Poland, Scotland, Slovakia, South Korea, Spain and Switzerland; as well as the top 20 in Australia, Denmark, Finland, Iceland and New Zealand.

== Music video ==
An official music video was uploaded to Guetta's official Vevo channel on April 22, 2013. The video uses the New Edit version of the song. Directed by Swede Andreas Nilsson, it generated controversy for its stereotypical portrayal of Mexico. The video and an advertisement from Neon Mixr feature the popular dancers, Les Twins. The video has over 1.26 billion views as of May 2026.

=== Synopsis ===
The video takes place in Mexico City, and two guys head to a dealer where they buy pointy cowboy boots to use in a dance competition. Their house has people dancing and cowboys playing dominos with Ne-Yo. They head to the dance competition and the cowboys compete. Eventually, a little boy eating a bag of Takis shows up riding in a Renault Twizy, and he begins dancing and wins the competition.

== Track listing ==
Digital download
No.	Title	Length
1.	"Play Hard"	3:21

Digital download
No.	Title	Length
1.	"Play Hard" (New Edit)	3:28

Digital download – EP
No.	Title	Length
1.	"Play Hard" (Albert Neve Remix)	6:52
2.	"Play Hard" (R3hab Remix)	4:06
3.	"Play Hard" (Maurizio Gubellini & Delayers in da House Remix)	5:00
4.	"Play Hard" (Maurizio Gubellini Remix)	5:11
5.	"Play Hard" (Spencer & Hill Remix)	6:19
6.	"Play Hard" (Extended)	5:12

German CD single
No.	Title	Length
1.	"Play Hard" (Albert Neve Remix)	6:52
2.	"Play Hard" (R3hab Remix)	4:06
3.	"Play Hard" (Maurizio Gubellini & Delayers in da House Remix)	5:00
4.	"Play Hard" (Maurizio Gubellini Remix)	5:11
5.	"Play Hard" (Spencer & Hill Remix)	6:19
6.	"Play Hard" (Extended Version)	5:12

== Charts ==
=== Weekly charts ===
Weekly chart performance for "Play Hard"
Chart (2012–2014)	Peak position
Australia (ARIA)	16
Austria (Ö3 Austria Top 40)	10
Belgium (Ultratop 50 Flanders)	7
Belgium (Ultratop 50 Wallonia)	5
Brazil (Billboard Brasil Hot 100)	46
Brazil (Hot Pop Songs)	15
Canada Hot 100 (Billboard)	34
Colombia (National-Report)	13
Czech Republic Airplay (ČNS IFPI)	9
Denmark (Tracklisten)	12
Euro Digital Song Sales (Billboard)	4
Finland (Suomen virallinen lista)	14
France (SNEP)	7
Germany (GfK)	8
Hungary (Dance Top 40)	4
Hungary (Rádiós Top 40)	7
Hungary (Single Top 40)	1
Iceland (Tónlist)	14
Ireland (IRMA)	8
Israel International Airplay (Media Forest)	8
Italy (FIMI)	4
Luxembourg Digital Songs (Billboard)	2
Mexico Anglo (Monitor Latino)	9
Netherlands (Single Top 100)	37
New Zealand (Recorded Music NZ)	11
Poland Dance (ZPAV)	5
Romania (Romanian Top 100)	59
Russia Airplay (TopHit)	4
Scottish Singles Sales (Official Charts)	5
Slovakia Airplay (ČNS IFPI)	5
South Korean International Singles (GAON)	7
Spain (Promusicae)	8
Sweden (Sverigetopplistan)	26
Switzerland (Schweizer Hitparade)	3
UK Singles (Official Charts)	6
UK Dance (Official Charts)	3
Ukraine Airplay (TopHit)	66
US Billboard Hot 100	64
US Hot Dance/Electronic Songs (Billboard)	9
US Dance Club Songs (Billboard)	2
US Pop Airplay (Billboard)	31
US Rhythmic Airplay (Billboard)	28
Venezuela Pop/Rock General (Record Report)	3

=== Year-end charts ===
Annual chart rankings for "Play Hard"
Chart (2013)	Position
Austria (Ö3 Austria Top 40)	39
Belgium (Ultratop Flanders)	31
Belgium (Ultratop Wallonia)	23
France (SNEP)	25
Germany (Official German Charts)	64
Hungary (Dance Top 40)	7
Hungary (Rádiós Top 40)	40
Italy (FIMI)	9
Russia Airplay (TopHit)	31
Spain (PROMUSICAE)	36
Sweden (Sverigetopplistan)	63
Switzerland (Schweizer Hitparade)	25
Ukraine Airplay (TopHit)	184
UK Singles (Official Charts Company)	36
US Dance Club Songs (Billboard)	5
US Hot Dance/Electronic Songs (Billboard)	21

Chart (2014)	Position
Hungary (Dance Top 40)	30

== Certifications ==
Certifications and sales for "Play Hard"
Region	Certification	Certified units/sales
Australia (ARIA)	Platinum	70,000^{^}
Austria (IFPI Austria)	Gold	15,000^{*}
Belgium (BRMA)	Gold	15,000^{*}
Denmark (IFPI Danmark)	Gold	15,000^{^}
France (SNEP)	Gold	75,000^{*}
Germany (BVMI)	Platinum	300,000^{‡}
Italy (FIMI)	3× Platinum	90,000^{‡}
New Zealand (RMNZ)	Platinum	15,000^{*}
Spain (Promusicae)	Platinum	60,000^{‡}
Switzerland (IFPI Switzerland)	Gold	15,000^{^}
United Kingdom (BPI)	2× Platinum	1,200,000^{‡}
Streaming
Denmark (IFPI Danmark)	Platinum	1,800,000^{†}
Spain (Promusicae)	Gold	4,000,000^{†}
^{*} Sales figures based on certification alone.^{^} Shipments figures based on certification alone.^{‡} Sales+streaming figures based on certification alone.^{†} Streaming-only figures based on certification alone.

== Release history ==
Region	Date	Format
Germany	March 15, 2013	Digital remixes; CD single
Italy	April 5, 2013	Contemporary hit radio
United States	May 7, 2013	Rhythmic radio
United Kingdom	May 20, 2013	Digital remixes
United States	June 11, 2013	Mainstream radio
