= Little Bad Girl =

Single by David Guetta featuring Taio Cruz and Ludacris

from the album Nothing but the Beat
- Released: 27 June 2011
- Genre: Electro house; hip house
- Length: 3:12
- Label: Virgin; EMI
- Songwriters: Taio Cruz; Christopher Bridges; David Guetta; Frédéric Riesterer; Giorgio Tuinfort
- Producers: David Guetta; Tuinfort; Riesterer; Black Raw

David Guetta singles chronology
"Where Them Girls At" (2011)	"Little Bad Girl" (2011)	"Without You" (2011)

Taio Cruz singles chronology
"Cryin' Over You" (2011)	"Little Bad Girl" (2011)	"Hangover" (2011)

Ludacris singles chronology
"Welcome to My Hood (Remix)" (2011)	"Little Bad Girl" (2011)	"Wet the Bed" (2011)

Music video
- "Little Bad Girl" on YouTube

"Little Bad Girl" is a song by French DJ David Guetta, featuring vocals from English recording artist Taio Cruz and American rapper Ludacris. It was released for digital download from 27 June 2011 by Virgin Records, serving as the second single from Guetta's fifth studio album Nothing but the Beat. This song later appeared on Cruz's third album TY.O.

All three artists co-wrote the song with Frédéric Riesterer and Giorgio Tuinfort, both of whom co-produced the song with Guetta as well as Black Raw.

This is the first of two collaborations between Cruz and Guetta, as Cruz would later co-write Guetta's single "Without You" featuring Usher. This is also the first of two collaborations between Ludacris and Guetta, as the two would later collaborate on the 2012 song "Rest of My Life" also featuring Usher. This is also the second collaboration between Ludacris and Cruz, after Ludacris appeared on the US version of Cruz's single "Break Your Heart".

== Music video ==
The music video was released on YouTube on 11 July 2011, directed by Dave Meyers. It features Guetta hosting a beach-side disco party called "Endless Night" (which he wants to literally never end) with Cruz and Ludacris in attendance. When Guetta sees the sun start to rise, he and many other guests run down to the beach and they all skid to a halt in front of the sea, causing the Earth to rotate backwards. The sun goes back down and this makes it dark again in other parts of the world when it had just been light. Ludacris can also be seen with a megaphone when rapping his verse. Towards the end of the video, the sun again starts to rise and Guetta runs off to repeat what he did before.

== Critical reception ==
Robert Copsey of Digital Spy gave the song three out of five stars writing, "Unfortunately, the reality of their paring-up [like the perfect double act] is far less enticing. "Look at her go on the dance floor/ She's amazing on the dance floor", Cruz continues over trance-lite synths before ushering his chosen lady to "go, little bad girl" to a by-numbers club-pumping beat on the chorus. The result is more synthetic than a Geordie Shore lass made up for a night on the lash - and about as effective as their patented Slutdrop."

== Track listings ==
- German CD single
1. "Little Bad Girl" (Radio Edit) - 3:12
2. "Little Bad Girl" (Fedde Le Grand Remix) - 6:43
- German CD single
1. "Little Bad Girl" (Extended Mix) – 4:43
2. "Little Bad Girl" (Norman Doray Remix) – 6:48
3. "Little Bad Girl" (Fedde Le Grand Remix) – 6:43
4. "Little Bad Girl" (Instrumental Club Mix) – 5:13
5. "Little Bad Girl" (Radio Edit) – 3:12
- 12" vinyl
1. "Little Bad Girl" (Extended Mix) – 4:43
2. "Little Bad Girl" (Norman Doray Remix) – 6:48
3. "Little Bad Girl" (Instrumental Club Mix) – 5:13
4. "Little Bad Girl" (Fedde Le Grand Remix) – 6:43
- Digital download
1. "Little Bad Girl" (Radio Edit) – 3:12
2. "Little Bad Girl" (Instrumental Club Mix) – 5:11
- Digital download - EP
1. "Little Bad Girl" (Radio Edit) – 3:12
2. "Little Bad Girl" (Extended Mix) – 4:43
3. "Little Bad Girl" (Norman Doray Remix) – 6:48
4. "Little Bad Girl" (Fedde Le Grand Remix) – 6:43
5. "Little Bad Girl" (Instrumental Club Mix) – 5:13

== Charts and certifications ==
=== Weekly charts ===
Weekly chart performance for "Little Bad Girl"
Chart (2011)	Peak position
Australia (ARIA)	15
Austria (Ö3 Austria Top 40)	5
Belgium (Ultratop 50 Flanders)	10
Belgium (Ultratop 50 Wallonia)	5
Canada Hot 100 (Billboard)	14
Czech Republic Airplay (ČNS IFPI)	21
Denmark (Tracklisten)	20
Finland (Suomen virallinen lista)	16
France (SNEP)	3
Germany (GfK)	5
Hungary (Dance Top 40)	15
Hungary (Rádiós Top 40)	12
Hungary (Single Top 40)	10
Ireland (IRMA)	8
Italy (FIMI)	17
Japan Hot 100 (Billboard)	71
Luxembourg (Billboard)	1
Netherlands (Dutch Top 40)	29
Netherlands (Single Top 100)	39
New Zealand (Recorded Music NZ)	19
Norway (VG-lista)	17
Poland Dance (ZPAV)	21
Romania (Romanian Top 100)	41
Scottish Singles Sales (Official Charts)	2
Spain (Promusicae)	22
Sweden (Sverigetopplistan)	7
Switzerland (Schweizer Hitparade)	7
UK Dance (Official Charts)	2
UK Singles (Official Charts)	4
US Billboard Hot 100	70
US Dance Club Songs (Billboard)	2
US Latin Pop Airplay (Billboard)	38
Venezuela Pop/Rock Songs (Record Report)	1

=== Year-end charts ===
Year-end chart performance for "Little Bad Girl"
Chart (2011)	Position
Australia (ARIA)	89
Austria (Ö3 Austria Top 40)	55
Belgium (Ultratop Flanders)	59
Belgium (Ultratop Wallonia)	45
France (SNEP)	47
Germany (Media Control AG)	46
Hungary (Rádiós Top 40)	48
Sweden (Sverigetopplistan)	57
Switzerland (Schweizer Hitparade)	55
UK Singles (Official Charts Company)	76
US Hot Dance Club Songs (Billboard)	29

=== Certifications ===
Certifications for "Little Bad Girl"
Region	Certification	Certified units/sales
Australia (ARIA)	Platinum	70,000^{^}
Austria (IFPI Austria)	Gold	15,000^{*}
Belgium (BRMA)	Gold	15,000^{*}
France (SNEP) Instrumental Edit	Gold	100,000^{‡}
Germany (BVMI)	Gold	150,000^{^}
Switzerland (IFPI Switzerland)	Gold	15,000^{^}
United Kingdom (BPI)	Gold	400,000^{‡}
Streaming
Denmark (IFPI Danmark)	Platinum	900,000^{†}
^{*} Sales figures based on certification alone.^{^} Shipments figures based on certification alone.^{‡} Sales+streaming figures based on certification alone.^{†} Streaming-only figures based on certification alone.

== Release history ==
Release history and formats for "Little Bad Girl"
Country	Date	Format	Label
Various	20 June 2011	Digital download - Beatport Exclusive	Virgin Records; EMI Music
Various	27 June 2011	Digital download - EP - iTunes / Amazon	Virgin Records; EMI Music
United States	June 28, 2011	Rhythmic radio	Astralwerks; Capitol
United Kingdom	10 July 2011	Digital download - EP	EMI Music
Germany	22 July 2011	CD single; 12" vinyl	EMI Music
