= Where Them Girls At =

Single by David Guetta featuring Flo Rida and Nicki Minaj

from the album Nothing but the Beat
- Released: 2 May 2011
- Recorded: 2010
- Genre: Hip house; electro house
- Length: 3:30 (album version); 3:14 (single version)
- Label: EMI; Virgin
- Songwriters: David Guetta; Tramar Dillard; Onika Maraj; Michael Caren; Jared Cotter; Juan Silinas; Oscar Silinas; Giorgio Tuinfort; Sandy Wilhelm
- Producers: Caren; Guetta; Sandy Vee

David Guetta singles chronology
| "Sweat" (2011) | "Where Them Girls At" (2011) | "Little Bad Girl" (2011) |

Flo Rida singles chronology
| "Dance with Me" (2011) | "Where Them Girls At" (2011) | "Club Rocker" (2011) |

Nicki Minaj singles chronology
| "Girls Fall Like Dominoes" (2011) | "Where Them Girls At" (2011) | "Lollipop Luxury (Remix)" (2011) |

"Where Them Girls At" (originally titled "Where Dem Girls At?") is a song by French DJ and record producer David Guetta featuring American rappers Flo Rida and Nicki Minaj. The track was released on 2 May 2011, via Virgin Records, serving as the lead single from Guetta's fifth studio album, Nothing but the Beat. The track was written by the artists alongside Jared Cotter, Play-N-Skillz, Giorgio Tuinfort, and Sandy Vee & Mike Caren, who produced the song with Guetta.

Initially, "Where Them Girls At" was recorded in 2010 and featured just Flo Rida, however after getting in touch with Minaj about a collaboration, Guetta played Minaj the record and she decided to record vocals for it. Computer hackers obtained an a cappella version of the song, and added their own production before leaking the song online. Guetta and his managing team subsequently mastered a proper version of the song, released it earlier than planned and called an employee of The Pentagon to investigate the matter. An accompanying music video for the song was filmed in Los Angeles in May 2011 and released on 28 June 2011. The song has been featured in Despicable Me 2 and it also used on a CBBC promo for Hotel Trubble in 2011.

== Production and release history ==
"Where Them Girls At"
A sample of "Where Them Girls At".

Guetta first worked with Flo Rida in 2010, when the duo collaborated for Rida's album Only One Flo (Part 1) and the Step Up 3D soundtrack. The duo released "Club Can't Handle Me" in 2010 under the condition that Rida would collaborate on a song for Guetta's fifth album Nothing but the Beat. Guetta would later approach Nicki Minaj for a collaboration, and although Minaj wanted to appear solo on one of Guetta's records, agreed to appear on "Where Them Girls At" after hearing it for the first time.

"Where Them Girls At" was written by Michael Caren, Jared Cotter, Flo Rida, David Guetta, Nicki Minaj, Juan and Oscar Silinas, Giorgio Tuinfort and Sandy Vee. An early version of the song featuring a cappella vocals was obtained by computer hackers, through accessing Guetta's recording studio's Wi-Fi connection. The hackers subsequently added their own production to the track and falsely posted it online as a Guetta song. As a result of their action, Guetta then released the single earlier than planned, with no promotion. Additionally, they hired an investigator from The Pentagon to find the perpetrators.

In an interview with MTV News in March 2011, Guetta revealed he was debating between two tracks to release as the first single from his upcoming fifth studio album: a song with English singer-songwriter Taio Cruz and American rapper Ludacris entitled "Little Bad Girl" or the track with Rida and Minaj, then known as "Where Dem Girls At?" A music video for the song, set to feature "a positive message", was filmed in Los Angeles in May 2011. "Where Them Girls At" hit U.S. mainstream and rhythmic radio on 17 May 2011.

The main synth was based on Guetta's 2009 hit song "Sexy Bitch". The song uses open fifths instead of a chord sequence, with a sequence of C-Eb-Bb-Ab. The song is set in modern time with a moderately fast tempo of 130 beats per minute.

== Critical reception ==
Lewis Corner from Digital Spy said "[the song] is a rambunctious mix of hard-hitting thuds and candy-coated synths over lyrics spouting the standard sexy laydee and partying clichés. Its centre, however, is a sweet 'n' gooey tongue-lashing from Minaj, who commands: 'Through the club all the girls in the back of me/ This ain't football why the fuck they tryna tackle me?', in her usual quick-witted, lickety-split manner." He awarded the song three out of five stars.

== Chart performance ==
Thus, "Where Them Girls At" saw a top ten debut in New Zealand and a top twenty debut in Ireland and the Netherlands. In addition, In addition, the song debuted at number two on Belgian-Wallonian Ultratop charts & topped the official Scotland charts, becoming Guetta's fourth number one and Minaj's and Flo Rida's first & the official Scotland charts. On the UK Singles Chart, the song debuted at number three, giving Guetta his twelfth top twenty hit. "Where Them Girls At" became an international summer success and contributed to Minaj's worldwide recognition, alongside her 2010 breakthrough solo smash-hit "Super Bass", which reached the top five in US, topped nations airplay charts and peaked at the top ten in several nations.

In France, David Guetta's native country "Where Them Girls At" entered at number 8 in May 2011 and later reached at number 4 in July 2011, becoming Minaj's first top five in the country and the first top five for a non-French female rapper. It became Flo Rida's second top five.

In the United States, the song debuted at number 14 on the Billboard Hot 100 chart, selling over 160,000 digital downloads in less than one week and giving Guetta his third top 20 hit in the US. As of December 2014, the song had sold over 1.6 million copies in the US. The song debuted at number three in Canada, becoming the highest debuting song that week on the Canadian Hot 100.

Elsewhere in Europe, the song broke records and reached the top ten, including Switzerland, Italy, Austria, Germany, Australia, Norway, Spain, Finland and Denmark.

== Music video ==
On 28 June 2011, the official music video for "Where Them Girls At" was released via Facebook on a fan page named "David Guetta Turkiye" and premiered on Guetta's YouTube and Vevo channels the same day. All three artists, David Guetta, Flo Rida, and Nicki Minaj, appear in the video. However, the vocalists only appear in each of their respective verses. The video shows giant bubbles which contain the song's beats, drifting across the streets of Los Angeles and San Francisco. When people burst the bubbles, they start dancing uncontrollably. Flo Rida is seen rapping his verse in a poolside and Minaj is seen in an art gallery with two male models, Chadd Smith and Casper Smart of The LXD. Guetta is at a rooftop, table turning, and creating bubbles. Minaj inhales one of a bubble and starts singing to the beat of the music, while breathing out bubbles. The bubbles which Guetta produces, attract many people. especially women, to his party. In the video. David Guetta can be seen reading an Ice Watch wristwatch, using a Sony Ericsson Xperia Play smartphone to take a picture, and an animated billboard ad with a Renault Twizy Z.E. is also featured.

== Live performances ==
Minaj has performed her verses on select dates of her debut concert tour, the Pink Friday Tour.

== Track listing ==
- Digital download
1. "Where Them Girls At" – 3:14
- Digital download – instrumental
1. "Where Them Girls At" (Instrumental) – 3:14
- Digital download – Remixes EP
1. "Where Them Girls At" (Sidney Samson Remix) – 5:12
2. "Where Them Girls At" (Afrojack Remix) – 6:26
3. "Where Them Girls At" (Nicky Romero Remix) – 5:28
4. "Where Them Girls At" (Gregori Klosman Remix) – 6:17
5. "Where Them Girls At" (Daddy's Groove Remix) – 6:19
6. "Where Them Girls At" (Tim Mason Remix) – 4:36
- German CD single
1. "Where Them Girls At" – 3:14
2. "Where Them Girls At" (Sidney Samson Remix Edit) – 3:34
- German CD single
1. "Where Them Girls At" (Sidney Samson Remix) – 5:12
2. "Where Them Girls At" (Afrojack Remix) – 6:26
3. "Where Them Girls At" (Nicky Romero Remix) – 5:28
4. "Where Them Girls At" (Gregori Klosman Remix) – 6:17
5. "Where Them Girls At" (Daddy's Groove Remix) – 6:19
6. "Where Them Girls At" (Tim Mason Remix) – 4:36
7. "Where Them Girls At" (Extended Mix) – 6:35
- 12" vinyl
1. "Where Them Girls At" (Sidney Samson Remix) – 5:12
2. "Where Them Girls At" (Afrojack Remix) – 6:26
3. "Where Them Girls At" (Nicky Romero Remix) – 5:28
4. "Where Them Girls At" (Gregori Klosman Remix) – 6:17

== Charts ==
=== Weekly charts ===
Weekly chart performance for "Where Them Girls At"
| Chart (2011–12) | Peak position |
|---|---|
| Australia (ARIA) | 6 |
| Austria (Ö3 Austria Top 40) | 3 |
| Belgium (Ultratop 50 Flanders) | 4 |
| Belgium (Ultratop 50 Wallonia) | 2 |
| Canada Hot 100 (Billboard) | 3 |
| Canada CHR/Top 40 (Billboard) | 7 |
| Canada Hot AC (Billboard) | 28 |
| CIS Airplay (TopHit) | 61 |
| Czech Republic Airplay (ČNS IFPI) | 12 |
| Denmark (Tracklisten) | 9 |
| Finland (Suomen virallinen lista) | 5 |
| France (SNEP) | 4 |
| Germany (GfK) | 5 |
| Hungary (Dance Top 40) | 12 |
| Hungary (Rádiós Top 40) | 8 |
| Ireland (IRMA) | 5 |
| Italy (FIMI) | 3 |
| Japan Hot 100 (Billboard) | 63 |
| Lebanon Airplay (Lebanese Top 20) | 6 |
| Luxembourg Digital (Billboard) | 1 |
| Netherlands (Dutch Top 40) | 28 |
| Netherlands (Single Top 100) | 18 |
| New Zealand (Recorded Music NZ) | 6 |
| Norway (VG-lista) | 4 |
| Poland Dance (ZPAV) | 12 |
| Poland (Polish Airplay New) | 5 |
| Romania (Romanian Top 100) | 46 |
| Russia Airplay (TopHit) | 69 |
| Scottish Singles Sales (Official Charts) | 1 |
| Slovakia Airplay (ČNS IFPI) | 8 |
| Spain (Promusicae) | 10 |
| Sweden (Sverigetopplistan) | 7 |
| Switzerland (Schweizer Hitparade) | 3 |
| UK Singles (Official Charts) | 3 |
| UK Dance (Official Charts) | 2 |
| US Billboard Hot 100 | 14 |
| US Dance Club Songs (Billboard) | 10 |
| US Dance Airplay (Billboard) | 6 |
| US Hot Rap Songs (Billboard) | 24 |
| US Pop Airplay (Billboard) | 13 |
| US Rhythmic Airplay (Billboard) | 22 |

=== Year-end charts ===
2011 year-end chart performance for "Where Them Girls At"
| Chart (2011) | Position |
|---|---|
| Australia (ARIA) | 55 |
| Austria (Ö3 Austria Top 40) | 24 |
| Belgium (Ultratop Flanders) | 48 |
| Belgium (Ultratop Wallonia) | 17 |
| Canada (Canadian Hot 100) | 38 |
| France (SNEP) | 30 |
| Germany (Official German Charts) | 41 |
| Hungary (Dance Top 40) | 38 |
| Hungary (Rádiós Top 40) | 36 |
| Italy (Musica e dischi) | 69 |
| Netherlands (Dutch Top 40) | 166 |
| New Zealand (RIANZ) | 49 |
| Poland (Dance Top 50) | 24 |
| Spain (PROMUSICAE) | 27 |
| Sweden (Sverigetopplistan) | 20 |
| Switzerland (Schweizer Hitparade) | 41 |
| UK Singles (OCC) | 31 |
| US Billboard Hot 100 | 88 |
| US Dance/Mix Show Airplay (Billboard) | 32 |

2012 year-end chart performance for "Where Them Girls At"
| Chart (2012) | Position |
|---|---|
| Sweden (Sverigetopplistan) | 81 |

== Certifications ==
Certifications and sales for "Where Them Girls At"
| Region | Certification | Certified units/sales |
|---|---|---|
| Australia (ARIA) | 2× Platinum | 140,000^{^} |
| Austria (IFPI Austria) | Gold | 15,000^{*} |
| Belgium (BRMA) | Gold | 15,000^{*} |
| Denmark (IFPI Danmark) | Platinum | 900,000^{†} |
| France | — | 101,300 |
| Germany (BVMI) | 3× Gold | 450,000^{‡} |
| Italy (FIMI) | Platinum | 30,000^{*} |
| Mexico (AMPROFON) | Gold | 30,000^{*} |
| New Zealand (RMNZ) | 2× Platinum | 60,000^{‡} |
| Spain (Promusicae) | Gold | 20,000^{*} |
| Sweden (GLF) | Gold | 20,000^{‡} |
| Switzerland (IFPI Switzerland) | Platinum | 30,000^{^} |
| United Kingdom (BPI) | 2× Platinum | 1,200,000^{‡} |
| United States (RIAA) | Platinum | 1,600,000 |
^{*} Sales figures based on certification alone.^{^} Shipments figures based on certification alone.^{‡} Sales+streaming figures based on certification alone.^{†} Streaming-only figures based on certification alone.

== Radio and release history ==
Release dates for "Where Them Girls At"
| Country | Date | Format |
|---|---|---|
| Worldwide | 2 May 2011 | Digital download – EP |
| United States | 6 May 2011 | Digital download – Instrumental |
| United States | 17 May 2011 | Mainstream radio; rhythmic airplay |
| Germany | 27 May 2011 | CD single; 12" vinyl |
