= Just One Last Time =

2012 single by David Guetta

Single by David Guetta featuring Taped Rai

from the album Nothing But the Beat 2.0
- Released: 15 November 2012
- Recorded: 2010
- Genre: Progressive house
- Length: 3:42
- Label: Virgin
- Songwriters: David Guetta; Giorgio Tuinfort; Tom Liljegren; Alexander Ryberg
- Producers: David Guetta; Giorgio Tuinfort; Tom Liljegren

David Guetta singles chronology
"Rest of My Life" (2012)	"Just One Last Time" (2012)	"Play Hard" (2013)

Taped Rai singles chronology
"Just One Last Time" (2012)	"Shadow Of The Sun" (2013)

"Just One Last Time" is a song performed by French DJ and music producer David Guetta, featuring vocals from Swedish vocal duo Taped Rai. The track was released as the second single from the re-release of Nothing but the Beat, 2.0, and serves as the album's eighth single overall. The song was released via digital download on 15 November 2012 and was released as a CD single on 8 February 2013. The song is used as the theme song for the film A Good Day to Die Hard (2013).

== Music video ==
An official video for the track was uploaded to Guetta's official VEVO channel on 3 December 2012. The music video for the track was filmed in Los Angeles during October 2012 by director Colin Tilley. It features a man going in his half-burned house and lying on the bed and remembering the death of his girlfriend, reliving it and trying to change the past in his mind: he is sneaking out of his girlfriend's house to go and play a game of pool with Guetta, only to hear that the house is on fire. He races back to save his girlfriend, this time managing to do so, but is killed in the process.

== Track listing ==
Digital download – EP
No.	Title	Length
1.	"Just One Last Time" (Extended)	5:41
2.	"Just One Last Time" (Hard Rock Sofa Big Room Mix)	6:41
3.	"Just One Last Time" (Tiësto Remix)	7:06
4.	"Just One Last Time" (Hard Rock Sofa Remix)	6:57
5.	"Just One Last Time" (Deniz Koyu Remix)	6:41

German CD single
No.	Title	Length
1.	"Just One Last Time"	3:42
2.	"Just One Last Time" (Hard Rock Sofa Big Room Mix)	6:41
3.	"Just One Last Time" (Tiësto Remix)	7:06
4.	"Just One Last Time" (Hard Rock Sofa Remix)	6:57
5.	"Just One Last Time" (Deniz Koyu Remix)	6:41
6.	"Just One Last Time" (Extended)	5:41

Promotional CD single
No.	Title	Length
1.	"Just One Last Time"	3:42
2.	"Just One Last Time" (Extended)	5:41
3.	"Just One Last Time" (Hard Rock Sofa Big Room Mix)	6:41

== Charts and certifications ==
=== Weekly charts ===
Weekly chart performance for "Just One Last Time"
Chart (2012–13)	Peak position
Austria (Ö3 Austria Top 40)	31
Belgium (Ultratop 50 Flanders)	41
Belgium (Ultratop 50 Wallonia)	18
Czech Republic Airplay (ČNS IFPI)	17
France (SNEP)	14
Germany (GfK)	45
Hungary (Dance Top 40)	33
Hungary (Rádiós Top 40)	34
Ireland (IRMA)	16
Italy (FIMI)	15
Netherlands (Single Top 100)	100
New Zealand (Recorded Music NZ)	24
Poland Dance (ZPAV)	12
Slovakia Airplay (ČNS IFPI)	88
Spain (Promusicae)	25
Switzerland (Schweizer Hitparade)	44
Scotland Singles (OCC)	16
UK Dance (OCC)	3
UK Singles (OCC)	20
US Hot Dance/Electronic Songs (Billboard)	29

=== Certifications ===
Region	Certification	Certified units/sales
Italy (FIMI)	Gold	15,000^{*}
^{*} Sales figures based on certification alone.

=== Year-end charts ===
Chart (2013)	Position
Belgium (Ultratop Wallonia)	89
Hungary (Dance Top 40)	95
Italy (FIMI)	75
US Hot Dance/Electronic Songs (Billboard)	87

== Release history ==
Region	Date	Format	Label
France	25 November 2012	Digital download	What A Music
Australia	25 November 2012	Digital download	Virgin Records
Italy	21 December 2012	Contemporary hit radio	EMI
United Kingdom	31 December 2012	Digital download	Virgin Records
Germany	8 February 2013	CD single	Virgin Records
