= Crank It Up (David Guetta song) =

Song by David Guetta featuring Akon

from the album Nothing but the Beat
- Recorded: 2011
- Genre: Dance-pop, electro house, techno
- Length: 3:12
- Label: EMI
- Songwriter(s): David Guetta, Giorgio Tuinfort, Aliaune Thiam, Frédéric Riesterer
- Producer(s): Guetta, Tuinfort, Riesterer

Audio video
- "Crank It Up" on YouTube

"Crank It Up" is a song by French DJ and record producer David Guetta, featuring vocals by Senegalese-American R&B recording artist Akon. Taken from the former's fifth studio album, Nothing but the Beat. The song was written by Aliaune Thiam, Guetta, Giorgio Tuinfort and Riesterer. Production was also handled by Guetta, Tuinfort and Rister. On March 14, 2012, Guetta tweeted that he had a dilemma on choosing his next single, asking his fans for opinions, giving two tracks "Crank It Up" and "I Can Only Imagine" featuring Chris Brown and Lil Wayne, but ultimately lost to the latter.

== Track listing ==
- Album version
1. "Crank It Up" (featuring Akon) – 3:12

== Credits and personnel ==
Credits adapted from the liner notes for Nothing but the Beat.

- David Guetta – songwriting, production, mixing
- Aliaune Thiam – songwriting, lead vocals, production
- Giorgio Tuinfort – songwriting, production
- Frédéric Riesterer – songwriting, production
- Guy Katsav – recording, engineering

== Charts ==
Chart (2012)	Peak position
Australia (ARIA)	49
Canada (Canadian Hot 100)	50
France (SNEP)	64
Germany (GfK)	43
UK Singles (OCC)	96
US Dance/Electronic Digital Songs (Billboard)	18
