= Lunar (song) =

Promotional single by David Guetta and Afrojack

from the album Nothing but the Beat
- Released: 15 August 2011
- Genre: Electro house
- Length: 5:16
- Label: Virgin; EMI
- Songwriters: David Guetta; Giorgio Tuinfort; Nick van de Wall
- Producers: David Guetta; Afrojack

Audio video
- "Lunar" on YouTube

"Lunar" is an instrumental by French disc jockey and record producer David Guetta in collaboration with Dutch music producer and DJ Afrojack, from Guetta's fifth studio album, Nothing but the Beat. The instrumental track was released digitally on 15 August 2011, as the second of three promotional singles from the album, following the song "Titanium".

== Track listing ==
Digital download
No.	Title	Length
1.	"Lunar"	5:16

== Charts ==
Chart (2011)	Peak position
Austria (Ö3 Austria Top 40)	58
France (SNEP)	50
Germany (GfK)	84
Spain (Promusicae)	45
UK Dance (OCC)	22
UK Singles (OCC)	90

== Release history ==
Country	Date	Format	Label
Australia	15 August 2011	Digital download	Virgin Records; EMI
Austria	15 August 2011	Digital download	Virgin Records; EMI
Canada	15 August 2011	Digital download	Virgin Records; EMI
France	15 August 2011	Digital download	Virgin Records; EMI
Germany	15 August 2011	Digital download	Virgin Records; EMI
Ireland	15 August 2011	Digital download	Virgin Records; EMI
Netherlands	15 August 2011	Digital download	Virgin Records; EMI
New Zealand	15 August 2011	Digital download	Virgin Records; EMI
United Kingdom	15 August 2011	Digital download	Virgin Records; EMI
