= Without You (David Guetta song) =

2011 single by David Guetta featuring Usher

Single by David Guetta featuring Usher

from the album Nothing but the Beat
- Released: September 29, 2011
- Studio: Test Pressing Studio, Naples, Italy
- Genre: Dance-pop
- Length: 3:28
- Label: Virgin; EMI
- Songwriters: Jacob Cruz; Usher Raymond IV; Rico Love; David Guetta; Giorgio Tuinfort; Frédéric Riesterer
- Producers: David Guetta; Giorgio Tuinfort; Frédéric Riesterer; Black Raw

David Guetta singles chronology
"Little Bad Girl" (2011)	"Without You" (2011)	"Titanium" (2011)

Usher singles chronology
"Promise" (2011)	"Without You" (2011)	"Climax" (2012)

Music video
- "Without You" on YouTube

"Without You" is a song by French DJ and record producer David Guetta featuring vocals from American singer-songwriter Usher. It was released as the third single from Guetta's fifth studio album, Nothing but the Beat, on 29 September 2011. The single peaked at number four on the Billboard Hot 100 in the US, becoming Guetta's third top ten single, following "Club Can't Handle Me" and "Sexy Bitch", as well as his highest peaking in the US to date. By November 2013, the song had sold 2,684,000 copies in the US.

== Background ==
The song features the vocals of R&B singer Usher, who told Billboard magazine that the project was, "maybe the biggest song I've made in my life". Guetta said, "We were in bargaining sessions for a while. Usher was saying, 'I need this record for my album.' I said, 'I'm sorry, I cannot give it to you.' After a while he called me back and gave in." Guetta told MTV News why he chose Usher to guest on this song. "It's just totally emotional," he said. "Some of the record is a proper ballad, and then it goes to that crazy dance beat. It's perfect for him, because he's famous for his ballads. And he's also now famous for those big club records that he comes with. He's an amazing dancer, so I felt like he was the artist that I needed." Usher told MTV News that this ode to not giving up on love in the face of adversity resonated with him personally. "I think the world wanted a record like that. That [song] really spoke to the journey that I've actually been on in the last three years... Traveling all around the world, music sounds different. There's many different genres, and when you see R&B and pop and house, as well as electronic, come together, that's the reality of what music is."

== Composition ==
"Without You" was written by Taio Cruz, Usher Raymond, Rico Love, David Guetta, Giorgio Tuinfort and Frédéric Riesterer, and produced by Guetta, Tuinfort and Riesterer. Lyrically, the song laments a heavy subject - life without someone who means the world to you. Amy Sciarretto of Pop Crush wrote that the chorus "invite lots of dancing, but this isn't much of clubby rager. Structurally, the song reminds us of Madonna's 'Ray of Light'; that's not to suggest that 'Without You' sounds like 'Ray of Light', but it shares the same formula and airy energy. Lyrics also heavily influenced by U2’s With or Without You."

"Without You" is set in common time maintaining a tempo of 128 beats per minute. The song is in the key of D major and has elements of pop, dance and R&B. The chords follow a sequence of D-Gsus2-Bm7-Gsus2 in the verses, and D/F#-G-Em-Bm-A-Gsus2 in the chorus. Usher's vocals range from A_{3} to D_{6}.

== Critical reception ==
In a favorable review, Amy Sciarretto of Pop Crush wrote that the song is "a light, hands-in-the-air and somewhat ethereal song" and that "the heft of the words juxtaposed against the feathery music works and allows the song to remain buoyant and well, not a downer despite its unhappy musings".

Jon Dolan of Rolling Stone wrote that on the track "Usher gets lonely over Coldplay-style guitar". Village Voice's Carol Cooper gave a negative review, writing, "Usher, while pushing himself vocally, sounds like a Glee Project."

== Music video ==
The music video was filmed towards the end of July 2011 on a beach in Portugal. The full music video was released on October 14, 2011, coinciding with Usher's 33rd birthday. The video shows views of different parties in Thailand, the United States, Brazil and South Africa, among other places. Continental drift starts to take place as a result and all the parties on the different continents amalgamate to form one big party. It also has scenes with Usher in front of a Rio de Janeiro beach background. The final shot shows Earth and all the continents merged into Pangaea.

The song was featured in the first trailer to the 2016 movie Sing.

== Track listing ==
1. "Without You" (Extended mix)
2. "Without You" (Nicky Romero remix)
3. "Without You" (R3HAB's XS remix)
4. "Without You" (Armin van Buuren remix)
5. "Without You" (Radio edit)

== Credits and personnel ==
Recording

- Additional production, mixed and mastered at Test Pressing Studio, Naples, Italy
- Vocals mixed at The Mix Room at Oasis Mastering, Burbank, California

Personnel

- Usher Raymond IV – songwriter (courtesy of LaFace Records), lead vocals
- Taio Cruz – songwriter (courtesy of Island Records), background vocals
- Rico Love – songwriter
- David Guetta – producer, background vocals, songwriter
- Giorgio Tuinfort – producer, songwriter
- Frédéric Riesterer – producer, songwriter
- Black Raw – additional producer, mixing, mastering
- Mark "Exit" Goodchild – vocal mixing
- Kevin Hissink – guitar

== Charts ==
=== Weekly charts ===
Weekly chart performance for "Without You"
Chart (2011–2012)	Peak position
Australia (ARIA)	6
Austria (Ö3 Austria Top 40)	5
Belgium (Ultratop 50 Flanders)	5
Belgium Dance (Ultratop Flanders)	4
Belgium (Ultratop 50 Wallonia)	5
Belgium Dance (Ultratop Wallonia)	2
Brazil (Billboard Hot 100)	3
Canada Hot 100 (Billboard)	3
Canada AC (Billboard)	6
Canada CHR/Top 40 (Billboard)	2
Canada Hot AC (Billboard)	1
CIS Airplay (TopHit)	8
Colombia (National-Report)	17
Czech Republic Airplay (ČNS IFPI)	12
Denmark (Tracklisten)	7
Finland Download (Latauslista)	22
France (SNEP)	6
Germany (GfK)	7
Greece Digital Songs (Billboard)	8
Hungary (Dance Top 40)	19
Hungary (Rádiós Top 40)	3
Ireland (IRMA)	10
Israel International Airplay (Media Forest)	4
Italy (FIMI)	2
Japan Hot 100 (Billboard)	40
Lebanon (The Official Lebanese Top 20)	6
Luxembourg (Billboard)	5
Mexico (Billboard Mexican Airplay)	5
Mexico Anglo (Monitor Latino)	6
Netherlands (Dutch Top 40)	6
Netherlands (Mega Dance Top 30)	1
Netherlands (Single Top 100)	5
New Zealand (Recorded Music NZ)	5
Norway (VG-lista)	7
Poland Dance (ZPAV)	26
Romania (Romanian Top 100)	11
Russia Airplay (TopHit)	10
Scottish Singles Sales (Official Charts)	4
Slovakia Airplay (ČNS IFPI)	1
South Korean International Singles (GAON)	4
Spain (Promusicae)	17
Sweden (Sverigetopplistan)	5
Switzerland (Schweizer Hitparade)	3
UK Singles (Official Charts)	6
UK Dance (Official Charts)	2
Ukraine Airplay (TopHit)	26
US Billboard Hot 100	4
US Adult Contemporary (Billboard)	12
US Adult Pop Airplay (Billboard)	14
US Dance Club Songs (Billboard)	3
US Dance Airplay (Billboard)	1
US Latin Pop Airplay (Billboard)	14
US Pop Airplay (Billboard)	1
US Rhythmic Airplay (Billboard)	5
Venezuela Pop Rock General (Record Report)	5

=== Year-end charts ===
2011 year-end chart performance for "Without You"
Chart (2011)	Position
Australia (ARIA)	42
Australia Dance (ARIA)	11
Austria (Ö3 Austria Top 40)	57
Belgium (Ultratop Flanders)	43
Belgium (Ultratop Wallonia)	83
Brazil (Crowley)	86
Canada (Canadian Hot 100)	47
Denmark (Hitlisten)	46
France (SNEP)	46
Germany (Media Control AG)	39
Hungary (Rádiós Top 40)	55
Italy (Musica e dischi)	22
Netherlands (Dutch Top 40)	39
Netherlands (Single Top 100)	47
New Zealand (RIANZ)	25
Russia Airplay (TopHit)	128
Sweden (Sverigetopplistan)	41
Switzerland (Schweizer Hitparade)	43
UK Singles (Official Charts Company)	50
US Billboard Hot 100	73
US Mainstream Top 40 (Billboard)	44

2012 year-end chart performance for "Without You"
Chart (2012)	Position
Canada (Canadian Hot 100)	21
Hungary (Rádiós Top 40)	61
Italy (FIMI)	87
Netherlands (Dutch Top 40)	69
Netherlands (Single Top 100)	99
Russia Airplay (TopHit)	91
Spain (PROMUSICAE)	45
Sweden (Sverigetopplistan)	73
Ukraine Airplay (TopHit)	52
UK Singles (Official Charts Company)	148
US Billboard Hot 100	50
US Adult Contemporary (Billboard)	28
US Adult Top 40 (Billboard)	45
US Dance/Mix Show Airplay (Billboard)	20
US Mainstream Top 40 (Billboard)	33
US Rhythmic (Billboard)	39

== Certifications ==
Certifications and sales for "Without You"
Region	Certification	Certified units/sales
Australia (ARIA)	4× Platinum	280,000^{^}
Austria (IFPI Austria)	Gold	15,000^{*}
Belgium (BRMA)	Gold	15,000^{*}
Brazil (Pro-Música Brasil)	Platinum	60,000^{‡}
Denmark (IFPI Danmark)	Gold	15,000^{^}
Germany (BVMI)	Gold	150,000^{^}
Italy (FIMI)	3× Platinum	90,000^{*}
New Zealand (RMNZ)	3× Platinum	90,000^{‡}
Spain (Promusicae)	Gold	30,000^{‡}
Switzerland (IFPI Switzerland)	Platinum	30,000^{^}
United Kingdom (BPI)	2× Platinum	1,200,000^{‡}
United States (RIAA)	2× Platinum	2,935,000
Streaming
Denmark (IFPI Danmark)	2× Platinum	1,800,000^{†}
^{*} Sales figures based on certification alone.^{^} Shipments figures based on certification alone.^{‡} Sales+streaming figures based on certification alone.^{†} Streaming-only figures based on certification alone.

== Radio and release history ==
Release dates for "Without You"
Country	Date	Format
United States	27 September 2011	Mainstream radio; rhythmic radio
Australia	21 October 2011	Digital Remixes EP
Austria	21 October 2011	Digital Remixes EP
Belgium	21 October 2011	Digital Remixes EP
Denmark	21 October 2011	Digital Remixes EP
Finland	21 October 2011	Digital Remixes EP
France	21 October 2011	Digital Remixes EP
Germany	21 October 2011	Digital Remixes EP
Greece	21 October 2011	Digital Remixes EP
Ireland	21 October 2011	Digital Remixes EP
Italy	21 October 2011	Digital Remixes EP
Japan	21 October 2011	Digital Remixes EP
Luxembourg	21 October 2011	Digital Remixes EP
Netherlands	21 October 2011	Digital Remixes EP
New Zealand	21 October 2011	Digital Remixes EP
Norway	21 October 2011	Digital Remixes EP
Portugal	21 October 2011	Digital Remixes EP
Sweden	21 October 2011	Digital Remixes EP
Switzerland	21 October 2011	Digital Remixes EP
United Kingdom	23 October 2011	Digital Remixes EP
Germany	4 November 2011	CD single; 12" vinyl
United States	8 November 2011	Hot adult contemporary radio
United States	10 January 2012	Digital Remixes EP
