= Repeat (song) =

Song by David Guetta featuring Jessie J

from the album Nothing but the Beat
- Released: 29 August 2011
- Genre: Electro house
- Length: 3:26
- Label: Virgin, EMI
- Songwriters: Jessica Cornish, Ali Tennant, David Guetta, Giorgio Tuinfort, Invisible Men, Frédéric Riesterer
- Producers: David Guetta, Giorgio Tunifort, Frédéric Riesterer

"Repeat" is a song by French DJ David Guetta, featuring vocals from British recording artist Jessie J. Written by Jessie J, The Invisible Men, Ali Tennant, David Guetta, Giorgio Tuinfort, Frédéric Riesterer and produced by Guetta, Tuinfort, Riesterer, the song has thus far peaked at number 108 in UK Singles Chart.

Musically, "Repeat" is a mid-tempo pop song, with lyrics that feature Jessie dancing to the beat. Music critics positively reviewed the song, praising Jessie's vocal performance.

== Background ==
Written by Jessie J, The Invisible Men, Ali Tennant, David Guetta, Giorgio Tuinfort, Frédéric Riesterer and produced by Guetta. This song features the vocals of English singer-songwriter Jessie J.

== Critical reception ==
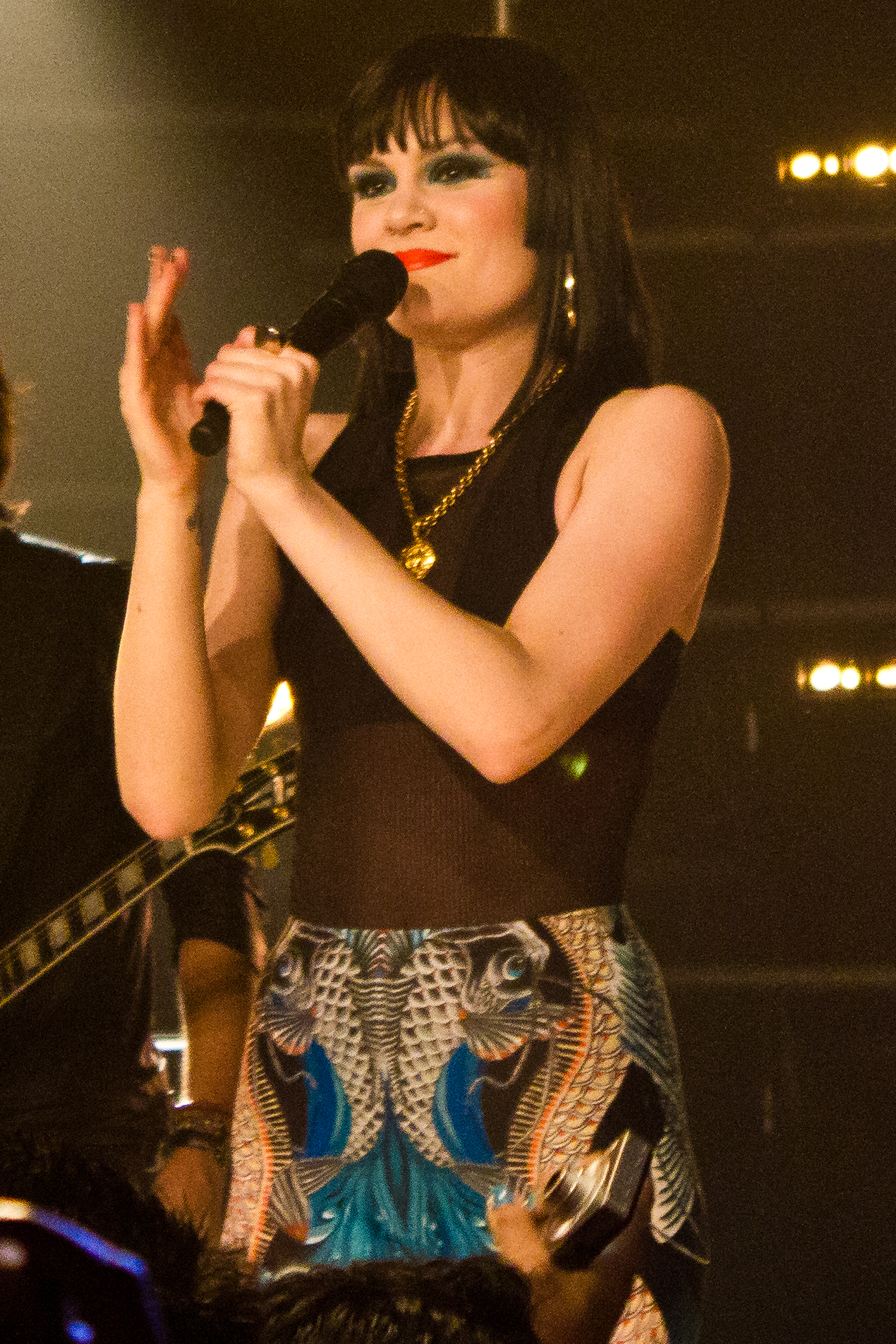
Jessie J's vocals on the track were praised.

Scott Shetler of PopCrush said: "Guetta wisely avoids the synth loops on the mid-tempo track 'Repeat' and instead lets Jessie J show off her voice: "I wanna know was I the one, or just the chick on the side? / I gave it all, broke it down my walls, don't you dare say I didn't try." An infectious hook makes 'Repeat' one of the most fun-sounding breakup songs we can remember." Digital Spy's Robert Copsey gave a review: "A combination of a chill melody, emotional vocals, and a more progressive tune make this a first for Guetta. "Repeat" reminds us a little of "When Love Takes Over", not as big room but same sort of transition. While the vocals of Jessie J are pleasant, they don't lead us to believe that this will be any sort of genre transcending track."

== Chart performance ==
In the United Kingdom, "Repeat" peaked at number 108 on the UK Singles Chart on 9 October 2011. It also charted on the Europe Top 100, where it peaked at number sixty-nine.

== Credits and personnel ==
Credits adapted from the album's liner notes.

- Jessica Cornish - songwriting and lead vocals
- The Invisible Men - songwriter
- Ali Tennant - songwriter
- David Guetta - songwriter, production and all instruments
- Giorgio Tuinfortt - songwriter, producer
- Frédéric Riesterer - songwriter, producer

== Charts ==
Chart (2011)	Peak position
UK Singles (Official Charts Company)	108

== Release history ==
Country	Date	Type	Label
United Kingdom	29 August 2011	Digital download	Virgin, EMI
Australia	20 March 2013	Mainstream radio	Virgin, EMI
