= I Can Only Imagine (David Guetta song) =

2012 single by David Guetta

Single by David Guetta featuring Chris Brown and Lil Wayne

from the album Nothing but the Beat
- Released: 21 April 2012
- Studio: Paris, France (Gum Prod, Catfield); Amsterdam, Netherlands (Piano Music); Ibiza, Spain (Can Rocas); Naples, Italy (Test Pressing)
- Genre: EDM; hip house
- Length: 3:29
- Label: Virgin; EMI
- Songwriters: Christopher Brown; Dwayne Carter; Jacob Luttrell; Nasri Atweh; David Guetta; Giorgio Tuinfort; Frédéric Riesterer
- Producers: David Guetta; Frédéric Riesterer; Black Raw

David Guetta singles chronology
"The Alphabeat" (2012)	"I Can Only Imagine" (2012)	"Laserlight" (2012)

Chris Brown singles chronology
"Till I Die" (2012)	"I Can Only Imagine" (2012)	"Put It Down" (2012)

Lil Wayne singles chronology
"HYFR (Hell Ya Fucking Right)" (2012)	"I Can Only Imagine" (2012)	"My Homies Still" (2012)

"I Can Only Imagine" is a song performed by French DJ David Guetta, featuring vocals from American singer Chris Brown and rapper Lil Wayne, from Guetta's fifth studio album Nothing but the Beat. It was released as the sixth single from the album on April 21, 2012. Prior to its official release, the song charted in the lower regions of the charts in Canada, France, Germany, Netherlands, the United Kingdom, and the United States. Guetta, Brown and Wayne performed the song live for the first time at the 54th Grammy Awards on February 12, 2012.

== Music video ==
The video was filmed on May 29, 2012, and premiered on July 2, 2012. It was directed by Colin Tilley. Guetta said that the video focuses more on futuristic images rather than on a plot as some of Guetta's other videos played out. It first opens up with Guetta walking into a room, and Brown appears in a mask as his eyes light up. As Brown starts singing in another scene, he is in a light-up suit. As the chorus plays, Brown is seen in a zero-gravity room. Guetta also then seen in the zero-gravity room. Wayne then is seen with a skateboard with a few other skateboarders in the background. Wayne is also located in another futuristic room. Brown is then seen in another room with a lit-up floor as he dances while he sings the chorus. Five other dancers join Brown.

== Live performances ==
"I Can Only Imagine" was performed live by Guetta, Brown and Wayne at the 54th Annual Grammy Awards.

== Track listing ==
Digital download
No.	Title	Length
1.	"I Can Only Imagine" (Live at the 54th Annual Grammy Awards)	3:09

Digital download — EP
No.	Title	Length
1.	"I Can Only Imagine" (David Guetta and Daddy's Groove Remix)	5:50
2.	"I Can Only Imagine" (R3hab Remix)	4:43
3.	"I Can Only Imagine" (Extended Mix)	5:31

Promotional CD single
No.	Title	Length
1.	"I Can Only Imagine"	3:29

Promotional CD single
No.	Title	Length
1.	"I Can Only Imagine"	3:29
2.	"I Can Only Imagine" (David Guetta and Daddy's Groove Remix)	5:50
3.	"I Can Only Imagine" (R3hab Remix)	4:43
4.	"I Can Only Imagine" (Extended Mix)	5:31
5.	"I Can Only Imagine" (Instrumental)	3:29

== Charts and certifications ==
=== Weekly charts ===
Chart (2011–12)	Peak position
Australia (ARIA)	47
Austria (Ö3 Austria Top 40)	17
Belgium (Ultratip Bubbling Under Flanders)	7
Belgium (Ultratip Bubbling Under Wallonia)	1
Canada Hot 100 (Billboard)	35
Czech Republic Airplay (ČNS IFPI)	46
France (SNEP)	40
Germany (GfK)	32
Hungary (Single Top 40)	2
Ireland (IRMA)	18
Italy (FIMI)	59
Netherlands (Dutch Top 40 Tipparade)	4
Netherlands (Single Top 100)	98
New Zealand (Recorded Music NZ)	28
Romania (Romanian Top 100)	36
Switzerland (Schweizer Hitparade)	15
UK Singles (OCC)	18
UK Dance (OCC)	2
US Billboard Hot 100	44
US Dance/Mix Show Airplay (Billboard)	14
US Dance Club Songs (Billboard)	10
US Pop Airplay (Billboard)	20
US Rhythmic Airplay (Billboard)	9

=== Year-end charts ===
Chart (2012)	Position
France (SNEP)	165

=== Certifications ===
Region	Certification	Certified units/sales
Australia (ARIA)	Gold	35,000^{^}
^{^} Shipments figures based on certification alone.
