= Night of Your Life (David Guetta song) =

Promotional single by David Guetta featuring Jennifer Hudson

from the album Nothing but the Beat
- Released: August 22, 2011
- Genre: Future soul
- Length: 3:41
- Label: Virgin; EMI
- Songwriters: Cristyle Johnson; Anthony Preston; David Guetta; Giorgio Tuinfort; Miriam Nervo; Olivia Nervo
- Producers: David Guetta; Giorgio Tuinfort

Audio video
- "Night of Your Life" on YouTube

"Night of Your Life" is a song by French DJ and producer David Guetta, featuring guest vocals by American R&B singer Jennifer Hudson. Taken from Guetta's fifth studio album, Nothing but the Beat (2011), the song was written by Cristyle Johnson, Anthony Preston, Guetta, Giorgio Tuinfort and Nervo, whilst the song was produced by Guetta and Tuinfort. "Night of Your Life" was released digitally on August 22, 2011, as the third and final promotional single from the album, as part of the iTunes Store's countdown to the album's release.

Musically, "Night of Your Life" is a future soul song, with lyrics that feature Hudson demanding her lover to worship her like a queen. Music critics positively reviewed the song, praising Hudson's vocal performance and noting it as one of the standout tracks from Nothing but the Beat. Critics also compared the song to Rihanna's "Only Girl (In the World)" (2010). Commercially, "Night of Your Life" reached the top 10 in Austria and Norway, and the top 20 in Denmark, Finland, Germany and Spain.

== Background ==
"Night of Your Life" was written by Cristyle Johnson, Anthony Preston, David Guetta and Giorgio Tuinfort, whilst production of the song was helmed by Guetta and Tuinfort. In an interview with Akshay Bhansali of MTV News, Guetta revealed that he did not know Hudson before collaborating on the song, saying, "I had heard her voice [before] and I fell in love with it. It's a difficult song. You need a really big voice to be able to perform that song. I was like, 'Whoa!' She obviously has an amazing voice, and I think it was a really interesting exercise for her and for me." Guetta further explained that when he collaborates with artists, he likes to "take them out of their boxes", and creating a dance record with Hudson was "really exciting" for him. On working with Hudson, he said, "She is beautiful in every way: as a person, as a singer, as a human being. She delivered [the song] like crazy." "Night of Your Life" was released for digital download on August 22, 2011, as the third and final promotional single from the album, as part of the iTunes Store's countdown to the album's release.

== Composition ==
"Night of Your Life"
A 25-second sample of part of the chorus of "Night of Your Life", featuring guest vocals by Hudson.

"Night of Your Life" is a future-soul song. According to Melinda Newman from HitFix, the opening of the song features beats that are "lightly bouncing around like colorful dancing polka dots", before the song switches into a "retro-sounding twirler with Hudson belting loud and clear." Tom Ewing from The Guardian noted the song bears similarities to Rihanna's "Only Girl (In the World)" (2010). Genevieve Koski from The A.V. Club wrote that on the song, "Jennifer Hudson manage[s] to keep [her] head above the waves of synths ... by amping up [her] vocals to match the outsized beats." Kerri Mason from Billboard magazine wrote that the song "takes a structure usually reserved for breathy chanteuses—the big-room trance vocal—and adds the firepower of Jennifer Hudson."

== Critical reception ==
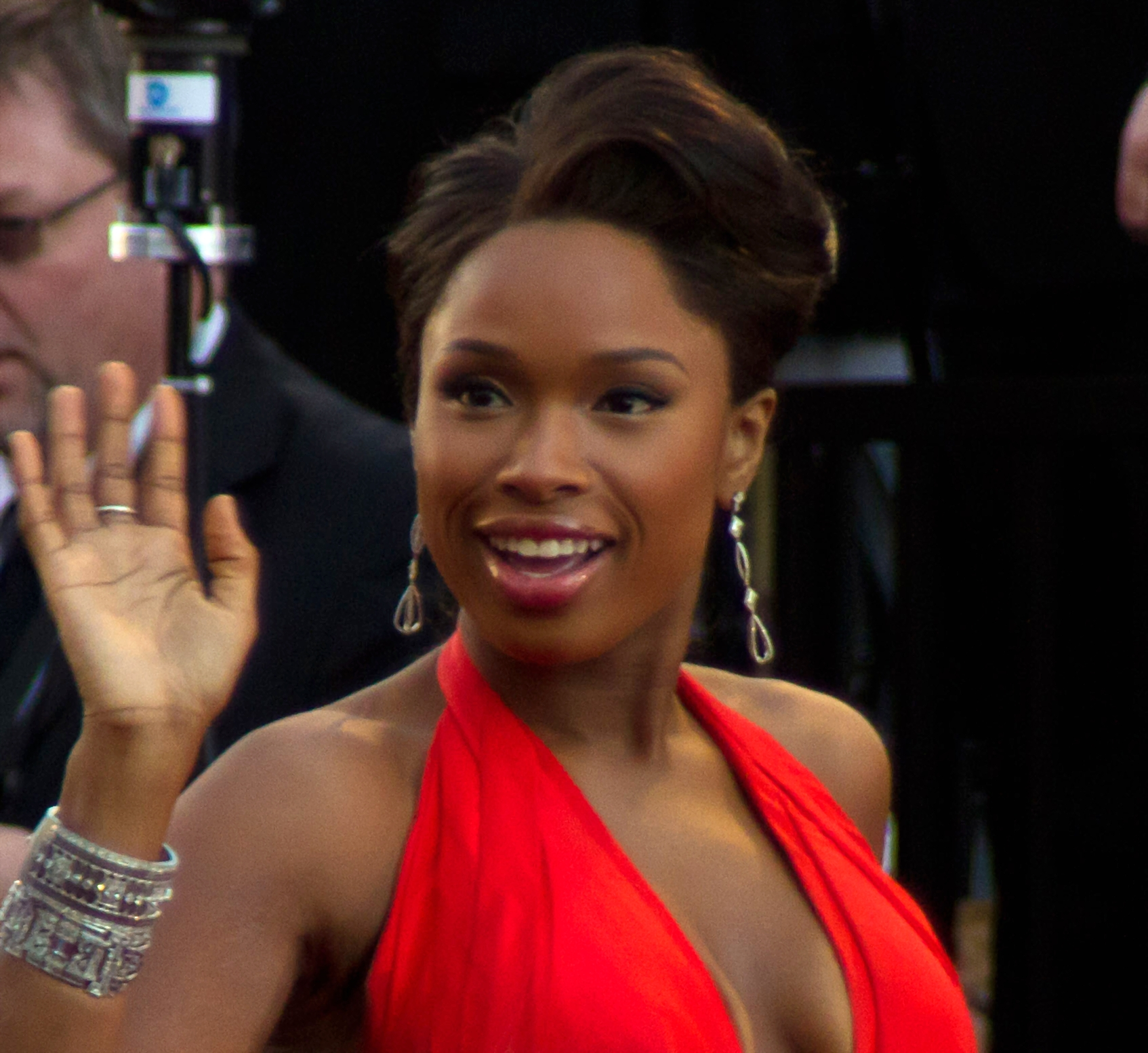
Jennifer Hudson's vocals on the track were praised by music critics.

Eric Henderson from Slant Magazine wrote that the song was "the album's only comparative highlight", but called it a "bald rip-off" of Rihanna's "Only Girl (In the World)." Robert Copsey from Digital Spy noted it as one of the album's "standouts", and wrote that "Hudson adds a classy, club classics touch to 'Night of Your Life'". Joe Copplestone from PopMatters noted that songs on the album such as "Night of Your Life" and "Titanium", "recall the power" of Guetta's previous collaborations with Kelly Rowland on "When Love Takes Over" (2009) and "Commander" (2010). A writer for Daily Herald praised Hudson's vocals on the track for having "all the right emotion in all the right places."

Pkboo from Samesame.com.au called "Night of You Life" a "bangin' radio ready single" and wrote that on "Night of Your Life", Hudson delivers "the in control swagger that has become her trademark". He also mentioned that the song was better than anything from her second studio album, I Remember Me (2011). Becky Bain from Idolator wrote that "it's one of the slickest collaborations" that she's heard from David Guetta so far. Bain also added that it was "refreshing" to hear Hudson "in a euphoric party mood after her more low-key offerings from her last album, I Remember Me." Rich Lopez from Dallas Voice gave the song a mixed review, and wrote that it "is amateurish and never lives up to her talent."

== Chart performance ==
"Night of Your Life" debuted at number 27 on the French Singles Chart, before dropping to number 73 the following week. The song debuted at number nine on the Austrian Singles Chart, peaked at number seven the following week, and spent eight non-consecutive weeks on the chart. It also debuted at number nine on the Norwegian Singles Chart, where it remained for two consecutive weeks. "Night of Your Life" reached the top 20 on the singles charts of Denmark, Finland, Germany and Spain. In Sweden, the song debuted at number 51 on the Swedish Singles Chart on September 2, 2011, and peaked at number 31 the following week. In the United Kingdom, "Night of Your Life" debuted at number 35 on the UK Singles Chart on September 3, 2011. It also charted on the UK Dance Chart, where it peaked at number nine.

In the United States, "Night of Your Life" debuted at number 81 on the Billboard Hot 100 chart on the issue dated September 10, 2011, selling 27,000 digital copies in its first week. In Switzerland, "Night of Your Life" debuted at number 24 on the Swiss Singles Chart on September 11, 2011, where it peaked. On the New Zealand Singles Chart, the song entered at number 38, and dropped off the chart the following week. In Australia, the song debuted on the ARIA Singles Chart at its peak position of number 37. On the Irish Singles Chart, "Night of Your Life" debuted and peaked at number 46, and stayed on the chart for one week.

== Credits and personnel ==
Credits adapted from the liner notes for Nothing but the Beat and Tidal.

- David Guetta – songwriting, production
- David Hachour – mastering
- Jennifer Hudson – lead vocals
- Cristyle Johnson – songwriting
- Miriam Nervo – songwriting
- Olivia Nervo – songwriting
- Anthony Preston – songwriting
- Florent Sabaton – mastering
- Giorgio Tuinfort – songwriting, production

== Charts ==
Weekly chart performance for "Night of Your Life"
Chart (2011)	Peak position
Australia (ARIA)	37
Austria (Ö3 Austria Top 40)	7
Canada (Canadian Hot 100)	30
Denmark (Tracklisten)	15
Finland (Suomen virallinen lista)	19
France (SNEP)	27
Germany (GfK)	12
Ireland (IRMA)	46
Italy (FIMI)	16
Luxembourg (Billboard)	6
New Zealand (Recorded Music NZ)	38
Norway (VG-lista)	9
Scotland Singles (OCC)	20
Slovakia (Rádio Top 100 Oficiálna)	76
Spain (Promusicae)	18
Sweden (Sverigetopplistan)	31
Switzerland (Schweizer Hitparade)	24
UK Dance (OCC)	9
UK Singles (OCC)	35
US Billboard Hot 100	81
Venezuela Pop Rock General (Record Report)	19
