= Incredibox =

Musical beatbox browser game

- Logo since 2019
- Developer: So Far So Good
- Publisher: So Far So Good
- Director: Allan Durand
- Programmer: Allan Durand
- Artist: Romain Delambily
- Composer: Paul Malburet
- Engine: HTML5
- Platforms: Web browser; iOS; Android; Amazon Appstore; macOS; Microsoft Windows; ChromeOS; Steam
- Release: August 16, 2009: Browser; August 16, 2009; iOS (iPad); March 28, 2016; iOS (iPhone); September 27, 2016; Android; December 15, 2017; Amazon Appstore; April 14, 2018; macOS; November 15, 2018; Windows; December 5, 2018; Steam; April 30, 2021
- Genre: Music video game
- Mode: Single-player

Incredibox (also stylized as INCREDiBOX or incredibox) is a 2009 beatboxing-based music video game created, developed, and published by the French company So Far So Good (SFSG). The concept of the game is users dragging and dropping sound icons on different characters to make music. The player can find combos to unlock animated bonuses and record mixes to integrate a ranking. An automatic mode is also available to generate an endless composition of randomness.

The name "Incredibox" is a portmanteau of "incredible" and "beatbox", a form of vocal percussion.

The game was released on many devices. It started as an iOS app for the iPad on March 28, 2016. It was then updated on September 24, 2016, for the iPhone. An Android version was released on December 15, 2017, on Google Play. It was made available on the Amazon Appstore on April 19, 2018. A desktop version was made for the Mac App Store on November 15, 2018, and the Microsoft Store on December 11, 2018. It was soon made available for Steam members on April 30, 2021. As of January 2023, the app has reached 2 million sales across all stores.

== Gameplay ==
A screenshot from Incredibox V6: Alive; the usable sounds are located in the bottom part of the screen, three animated bonuses are in the upper part.

"Wekiddy"
A 10-second mix of V9 Wekiddy

In Incredibox, players start by choosing one of nine musical styles. The player is then provided with an interface of seven identical-looking virtual beatboxers. The characters' face is a caricature of the musical composer and voice of the game, Paul Malburet, better known as Incredible Polo. In the space below, there are twenty "icons" which are divided into four categories: Beats, Effects, Melodies, and Voices. Each category has five sounds that all share the same color palette, depending on each of the version's theme. Each icon is a unique a cappella sound loop to drag-and-drop onto the characters from a range of hats, sunglasses, masks, headphones or other items that dress them as they are used and let them sing in rhythm with each other. To fine-tune a mix, the player can also swap out new sounds, mute sounds, or do a solo on one of them.

If the player creates a specific combination of five sounds, it's possible to unlock an animated bonus of a few seconds. For each musical style, there are three bonuses, which can be unlocked through different combinations of icons. Players can also record all their mixes and share it on social media via a URL. Contributors can listen and vote for their favorite tracks, with some gaining enough votes to be listed on a Top 50 chart within the official website and apps. For users who want to listen to an endless mix, an automatic mode can play loops of each version at random.

=== Versions ===
There are currently nine versions of Incredibox in the game that the players can choose from. Each one has a musical suite to it with a unique genre and setting. Versions V1 to V4 can be played both on the demo section on their website and the paid apps. Versions V5 and onwards are exclusive. They can only be played on the paid apps and cannot be played on the demo section on their website. The lineup consists of:

- V1: Alpha (Formerly called The Original) is the first version of Incredibox that was originally released as a flash game on August 16, 2009. This theme is inspired by old school beatbox, with some Jazz and Funk. This version was then remastered on June 26, 2018, replacing the original flash version.
- V2: Little Miss is the second version of Incredibox that was released on March 1, 2012. This theme is inspired by Hip-Hop. This is the first version to include varied clothing in each categories, while keeping the same monochromatic color scheme from the previous version.
- V3: Sunrise is the third version of Incredibox that was released on October 26, 2013. This theme is inspired by Electropop. This is the first version to include colors to each categories on their items and outfits to the characters, which features green beats, blue effects, red melodies, and yellow voices.
- V4: The Love is the fourth version of Incredibox that was released on November 12, 2014. This theme is inspired by French house. This version features yellow beats, sky blue effects, red melodies, and purple voices.
- V5: Brazil is the fifth version of Incredibox that was released on May 28, 2016. This theme is inspired by Brazilian music. This is the first version that was made exclusive to the paid apps. This features yellow beats, blue effects, green voices, and red melodies.
- V6: Alive is the sixth version of Incredibox that was released on March 6, 2018. This theme is inspired by Japanese culture, with music of modern hip-hop and trap genres. This version features blue beats, purple effects, red melodies, and orange voices.
- V7: Jeevan is the seventh version of Incredibox that was released on June 24, 2019. This theme is inspired by traditional Indian music and culture, especially Bollywood. This version features orange beats, red effects, blue melodies, and green voices.
- V8: Dystopia is the eighth version of Incredibox that was released on December 1, 2020. This theme is inspired by Cyberpunk culture. This version only features dark slate gray and orange colors on their items and outfits.
- V9: Wekiddy is the ninth version of Incredibox that was released on April 29, 2023. This theme is inspired by 90s hip-hop and pre-web popular culture. This version is the first one to feature multi-colored designs for all outfits & icons.

== Development ==
In 2006, three French friends from Saint-Étienne, Allan Durand, (director / programmer) Romain Delambily, (graphic designer) and Paul Malburet, (musician, known as Incredible Polo) wanted to mix their skills to create an interactive experience about music. Incredibox was released online on August 16, 2009, as a Flash game for web browsers. The flash game has five categories; Instruments, Percussion, Effects, Voice, and Chorus. The animated bonuses appears automatically, when the player drag-and-drops symbols onto the characters.

In July 2011, the team decided to set up their company, So Far So Good, which specialized in graphic design and multimedia to continue to develop their idea and "try to transform Incredibox into a professional project" as explained by Durand in a video interview. They decided to work half time on creative projects for customers and half time on Incredibox.

On March 1, 2012, They launched a second version of Incredibox, Little Miss, which was added to their web page. A third version, Sunrise, was added on October 26, 2013, and a fourth version, The Love, was added on November 12, 2014. Each version integrates new sounds, new character designs and new features like a recording mode, allowing users to share their mix via a URL, or by adding colors on characters and unique accessories to better identify each sound.

On March 28, 2016, SFSG released an iOS mobile app of the game only for the iPad. For the new mobile app's release, they created a new fifth version, Brazil. It was added on May 28, becoming the first version to be made exclusively for the mobile app. The iOS app was then later updated on September 19, so that it now runs both on the iPad and the iPhone. The game was made available to Android users and was released on Google Play on December 15, 2017.

On March 5, 2018, a new exclusive sixth version, Alive, was added to the mobile apps. On April 14, the game was made available to download on the Amazon Appstore. On June 26, they released a remastered first version for their website under its new name, Alpha. This new version, kept the same elements from the original, but with new improved sound and design of their characters and bonuses. It was added to the mobile apps on September 26. A desktop version of the game was published for the Mac App Store on November 15, and for the Microsoft Store on December 5.

On March 18, 2019, their official website has been updated with a new interface, revised design and fresh new gameplay. The website now features a demo section with featured the same layout just as the paid apps, but users can only play the versions: Alpha, Little Miss, Sunrise, and The Love. The Top 50 chart has can also be viewed on their website showcasing all versions, including the exclusive versions, by many app users all over the world.

On June 24, a new exclusive seventh version, Jeevan, was added to their apps. On September 20, both SFSG & Incredible Polo released a digital music album called Incredibox: 10th Anniversary. This album is a remastered collection of all the 7 versions of Incredibox, celebrating its 10th anniversary. A limited edition 12" Vinyl was released on November 25, while a physical CD was released on December 11.

On December 1, 2020, a new exclusive eighth version, Dystopia, was added to their apps. A remastered music single of Dystopia was released by SFSG & Incredible Polo on March 11, 2021. The game was made available on Steam on April 30. At the same time, they created an exclusive short film of the whole Dystopia story, with a brand new soundtrack & sound FX, different than from the game, and was released on their official YouTube page.

On July 2, 2021, the Incredibox app has reached 1 million sales across all stores. On September 6, Incredibox announced a new music album from SFSG & Incredible Polo called Incredibox: The Unreleased. This album of 9 tracks was made during many of the Incredibox's demo phases. The digital album was released on October 1, while the physical CD including the limited edition 12" Vinyl was released February 1, 2022.

On February 3, Incredibox announced a special new service called, Incredibox for Schools. This education version of the game is designed for schools in which students and teachers can use via directly from the internet. On January 1, 2023, the Incredibox app has reached 2 million sales across all stores. On April 29, a new exclusive ninth version, Wekiddy, was added to the apps. A remastered music single of Wekiddy was released by SFSG & Incredible Polo on September 15.

On March 12, 2025, it was announced that SFSG will include a special section, known as INCREDIMODS will be added into their official apps. These different versions of styles are created by modders, known as "Incredimodders." Only certain mods will be available on the official app that only been approved by SFSG.

== Reception ==
In 2009, shortly after its launch on web browser, Incredibox was featured on the FWA (Favorite Website Awards) as "Site of the Day" on September 15 and later FWA's founder Rob Ford announced that "this site will give you that coolness you have always desired" in a newsletter from Adobe in December.

In 2012, the updated web page with Incredibox 2.0 (later known as Little Miss) became instantly popular, that, after 600,000 visits in one day, the server crashed on April 13. During this week, the word "Incredibox" was the search term with "the most significant growth worldwide", as measured by Google Insights. At that time the success was partly due to the fact that several media like Vice, Jayisgames or Kotaku enjoyed the "simple" and "fun" concept of Incredibox, while others praised the innovative and creative approach of the interface: Slate's Forrest Wickman wrote that Incredibox was "wonderfully surreal", and in the meantime on Gizmodo Eliot Van Buskirk said that "as a demonstration of outside the box thinking about how to promote a song, Incredibox is impressive". During the BBC technology show Click on November 17, 2012, Kate Russell described Incredibox as a "brilliant browser sequencer" and explained that users "don't need to be a musical genius, as it's pretty much impossible to make something that sounds bad".

Since 2016 and the mobile app release, Incredibox seemed to be also appreciated by parents and teachers who found the game concept to be an educative way to promote creativity and experimentation by allowing children to explore a less conventional form of music. In an app selection of the HuffPost, Shira Lee Katz said that "kids are encouraged to experiment freely" and Polly Conway explained on Common Sense Media that Incredibox appeared to be a "fun" app to play around with, but that it was "teaching music and composition skills at the same time". In June 2018 Incredibox was awarded by AASL (American Association of School Librarians) as one of the "Best Apps for Teaching & Learning" during the ALA annual conference in New Orleans.

== Partnerships ==
On July 15, 2014, Incredibox made a partnership with AXE to promote the AXE Boat Festival in France by creating an exclusive limited version of the game entitled, Mix For Peace. After this partnership ended, most of the element designs and sounds from the campaign, were later spawned into the fourth version, The Love.

On February 28, 2017, Incredibox made another partnership with M&M's by creating a version of the game entitled Bite-Size Beats. This version featured the M&M's characters (Red, Yellow, Blue, Green, Orange and Brown) singing beatbox sound loops based on how users arrange them on screen, then the brand aired user-generated beats as TV commercials. On August 7, they extended this partnership with the help of singer, Jessie J, to unveil her song, "Real Deal," from her fourth album, R.O.S.E.. After finding a combo, fans were able to unlock a snippet of the song as an animated bonus made like a short video clip featuring Jessie J, Red, Yellow and Incredibox's avatar. The advertising campaign was later nominated for the 2018 Webby Awards in the mobile-campaigns category.

== Awards ==
- Digital Ehon Award (Digital expressions for children) - 2020 Grand Prize - March 2010.
- AASL (American Association of School Librarians) - 2018 Best Apps for Teaching & Learning - June 2018.
- The FWA (Favorite Website Awards) - Mobile of the day - May 2016.
- The Shenzhen Design Awards for Young Talents - Merit Award - September 2013.
- The Lovie Awards - Bronze Award (Weird/Experimental) and People's Lovie Award - November 2010.
- The Dope Awards - Web Award - September 2009.
- The Design Licks - Website of the day - September 2009.
- The FWA (Favorite Website Awards) - Website of the day - September 2009.
