= Digital Planet =

- Other names: Click, Go Digital
- Genre: Technology
- Running time: 18 minutes
- Country of origin: United Kingdom
- Language: English
- Home station: BBC World Service
- Hosted by: Gareth Mitchell; Bill Thompson; Ghislaine Boddington; Angelica Mari
- Created by: Alfred Hermida (co-creator)
- Produced by: Julian Siddle; Colin Grant; Ania Lichtarowicz
- Recording studio: Broadcasting House
- Original release: 28 August 2001 (as Go Digital) – 28 March 2023
- Website: Website
- Podcast: Podcast

Digital Planet (previously known as Click and originally Go Digital) is a radio programme broadcast on the BBC World Service presented by Gareth Mitchell. Alternating as contributors were Bill Thompson, Ghislaine Boddington and Angelica Mari, who comment on items in the programme and discuss them with Mitchell. The show, broadcast weekly, covered technology stories and news from around the world.

== History ==
From 2001 to 2005, it was presented by Tracey Logan and during that time it was one of the BBC's few webcast programmes, with cameras providing a live feed. Regular guest presenter Gareth Mitchell, who had been with the show since 2001, took over as presenter full time on 11 January 2005.

Originally named Go Digital, the show was renamed Digital Planet on 28 March 2006. It was again renamed Click on 29 March 2011 to make it easier to recognise its status as a sister programme of the TV programme Click, which is broadcast on BBC News and BBC World News. The show's running time was reduced from 28 minutes to 18 minutes. In the episode aired 1 May 2019, the show announced that it had renamed itself back to Digital Planet.

== Closure ==
On the 29th September 2022, shortly after celebrating its 21st anniversary with a special as live broadcast from the BBC’s Radio Theatre in Old Broadcasting House in London, it was proposed ending the show as part of a restructure of programming as part of the wider ‘Proposals for a digital-first World Service’.

At the end of the show broadcast on Tuesday 21st March 2023 it was announced by the host Gareth Mitchell that the following week's episode would be the last ever edition.

After the end of Digital Planet, in April 2023, Mitchell and Thompson returned with a new technology podcast, The Gareth and BillCast.

At the end of October 2023, Ania Lichtarowicz, one of the producers of Digital Planet, released the first episode of a new weekly global technology podcast starring Gareth Mitchell along with new presenters and previous presenters: Somewhere on Earth Podcast

== Show format and topics ==
Digital Planet covers a wide range of issues affecting technology. The first broadcast each week is also live (at 20:30 UK time on a Tuesday evening), whereas before the 2011 changes, it was recorded. The show is now around 27 minutes long. Often there are segments on technological solutions to problems facing charitable or humanitarian causes, with a speaker representing the cause being interviewed by Mitchell. One example is the segment on a screen saver which harnessed the power of idling home PCs to help perform complex mathematical calculations to help cure malaria.

Other topics covered have included:

- Modern plane technology
- problems with smartphone set up
- Blu-ray Disc vs. HD DVD
- The use of open source software around the world

Usually views sent either by e-mail, Facebook, Twitter or using the BBC News website are read out and discussed briefly by the hosts.

A special pre- and post show session for podcast listeners is produced which cannot be heard by those listening to broadcast radio. The fan club's Prezzi created a special picture for the show, which was framed, delivered and discussed on line, and held a Google Hangout during the show where listeners discussed the show in real time, and engaged with the presenters - see Thompson engaging with the Hangout on Air. The presenters were interviewed for the Project Kazimierz Podcast in 2015.

From 2016 to 2023, the "Digital Planet Listeners" Facebook group had a running theme hashtagged #FlatDarkStanleyNet in which Gareth Mitchell's copy of Jamie Bartlett's The Dark Net containing a bookmark (made by the illustrator Justine Rykiel) of Mitchell in his familiar checked shirt was passed around among listeners. It was based on the Flat Stanley Project. The bookmark and the book went around the world and were eventually returned to Mitchell.
