= Ageh =

Ageh may refer to:

- Tony Ageh (born 1959), British journalist
- A-gei, Taiwanese dish
- AGEH Gymnastikos B.C., Greek professional basketball club
- A US Navy hull classification symbol: Hydrofoil research ship (AGEH)
