= Easy on Me (disambiguation) =

"Easy on Me" is a 2021 song by Adele.

Easy on Me may also refer to:

- "Easy on Me", a song by Jessie J from her 2018 album R.O.S.E.
- "Easy on Me", a 2020 song by Rudimental and the Martinez Brothers
