= Kat Hawkins =

British technology journalist

- Born: Kathleen Hawkins
- Education: University of Leeds
- Occupation: Television presenter
- Television: Click
- Website: www.amputeekat.com

Kat Hawkins (born Kathleen Hawkins in December 1988, in Retford, Nottinghamshire) was a presenter, producer, and reporter. They worked on the BBC's technology programme Click, broadcast on the BBC World News and the BBC News Channel in the United Kingdom. After leaving university in 2012, they gained a place on the BBC's Journalism Trainee Scheme in 2013.

Both of Hawkins' legs were amputated below the knee in 2006 as a result of meningitis.

In addition to her TV work, they played sitting volleyball for Team GB, is a dancer, and has been studying yoga since 2013.

They also presented the program "People Fixing the World' on the BBC World Service radio.
