= Don't Tease Me with a Good Time =

Studio album by Jessie J
- Released: 28 November 2025
- Recorded: 2019–2025
- Studio: Peacetree (Studio City, California); Woods House (Los Angeles, California); Republic Records (Los Angeles); Metropolis (London, UK); Patriot (Los Angeles); Capitol (Hollywood, California); United Recording (Los Angeles)
- Length: 49:30
- Label: Darco Artist Partnerships
- Producer: Jesse Boykins III; Ray Brady; Bueno; Dixson; Los Hendrix; Marty Maro; Patrick McManus; Nathan Foley; T. Stewart; Aspene Taylor; Ryan Tedder; Varren Wade; Mike Woods

Jessie J chronology
This Christmas Day (2018)	Don't Tease Me with a Good Time (2025)

Singles from Don't Tease Me with a Good Time
- 1. "No Secrets" Released: 25 April 2025; 2. "Living My Best Life" Released: 16 May 2025; 3. "Believe in Magic" Released: 29 August 2025; 4. "H.A.P.P.Y" Released: 31 October 2025; 5. "I'll Never Know Why" Released: 28 November 2025

Don't Tease Me with a Good Time is the sixth studio album by English singer Jessie J. It was self-released on 28 November 2025, under licence to Darco Artist Partnerships (D.A.P). The album was preceded by five singles: "No Secrets", "Living My Best Life", "Believe in Magic", "H.A.P.P.Y", and "I'll Never Know Why". It features collaborations with variety of people, such as Ryan Tedder, Jesse Boykins III, Los Hendrix, and Marty Maro.

Even though Jessie J had early-stage breast cancer and surgery for the diagnose, she recorded the album for more than 5 years in Los Angeles, describing the project as the first work she has completed in eight years and as a layered collection that encompasses the "grief to joy" and the "life after the loss". It reached number nineteen on the UK Albums Chart.

== Background ==
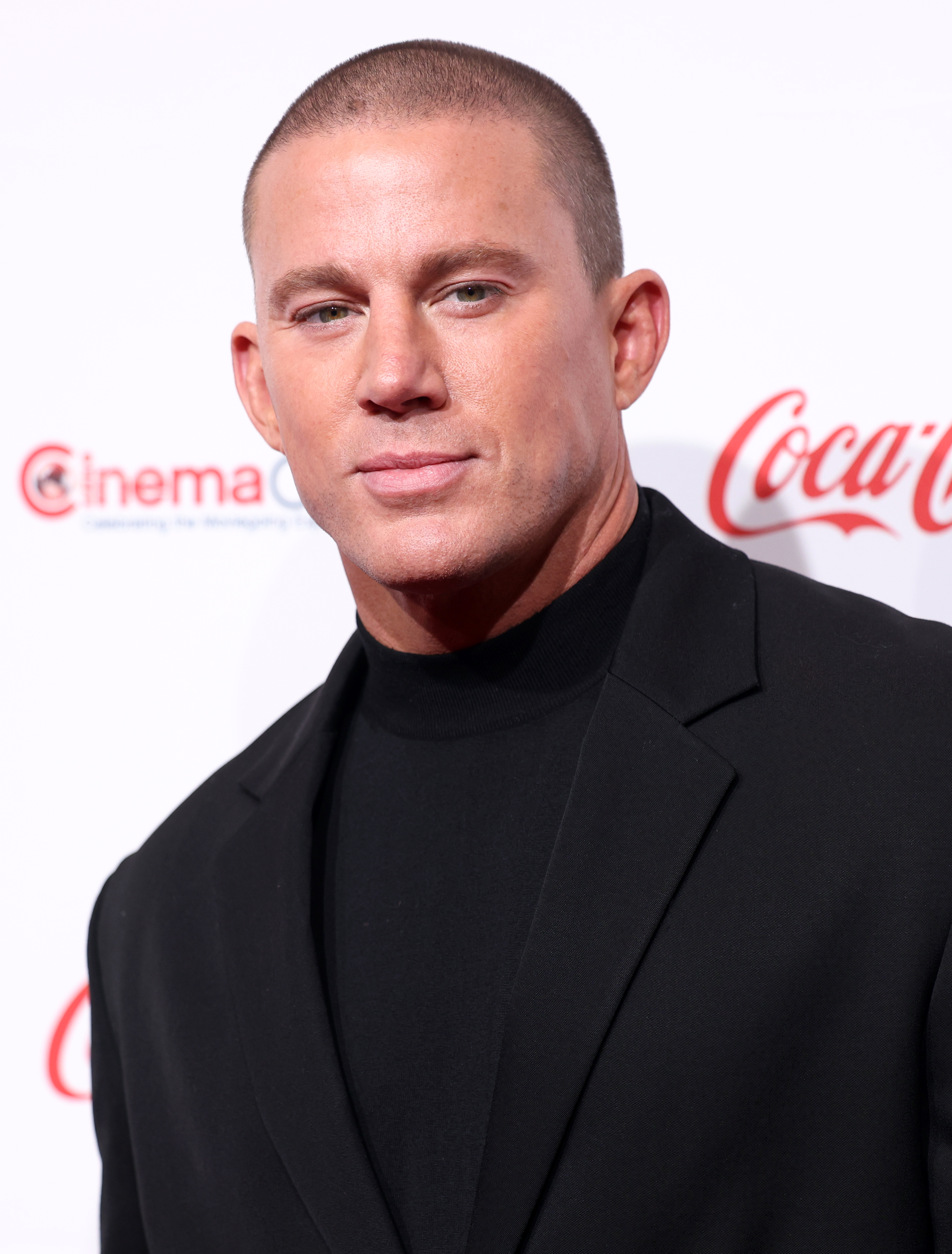
American actor Channing Tatum was referenced in early media speculation about the track "Threw It Away".

In June 2025, Jessie J revealed that she had been diagnosed with early-stage breast cancer and subsequently underwent surgery, after Summertime Ball. Despite the health challenges, she continued performing and introduced the single "Living My Best Life" as a reflection of her approach to resilience and healing, describing music as a source of strength and positivity.

Serving as the follow-up to her 2018 projects, R.O.S.E. and This Christmas Day, Don't Tease Me with a Good Time was recorded over a period of five years in Los Angeles. Reflecting on its creation, Jessie J described the project as her first full-length body of work in eight years, characterising it as a layered collection that spans "grief to joy" and "life after loss". She highlighted its range across genres and emotions, and noted that she hopes the songs provide comfort to listeners experiencing both good and difficult times. About the album's eleventh track, "Threw It Away", she remarked that she had written it in 2020 with Ryan Tedder, and suggested that its subject matter references a past relationship, during a London listening event. Media outlets noted that the song appears to allude to her former partner, actor Channing Tatum. However, shortly after these reports circulated, Jessie J addressed that the claims are "untrue" and clarified that the song was not written about him. She added that she chose to correct the narrative because she believed he would have done the same if the situation were reversed.

== Composition ==
Don't Tease Me with a Good Time combines elements of R&B and 1980s pop music. Composed of 16 tracks, the album features collaborations with Ryan Tedder, Jesse Boykins III, Los Hendrix, and Marty Maro.

The opener "Feel It on Me" introduces the album with a strong '90s R&B melody. In "I Don't Care", Jessie J frames the track as a message for anyone in an abusive relationship to leave and celebrate themselves. "No Secrets" is "a slick, soul-baring track" that reflects one of Jessie J's most controlled vocal performances, by using minimalism to frame its themes of navigating life in the public eye. "I'll Never Know Why", a response to losing someone dear to mental-health struggles, channels the "gut-wrenching" grief that shaped its lyrics. Co-written with Marty Rod and Ryan Tedder, "H.A.P.P.Y." intentionally contrasts the surrounding material, as it leans into a more "light-hearted" and infectious energy.

== Promotion ==
=== Marketing and touring ===
Before the album's release, fans were given the opportunity to pre-order the album in vinyl and CD formats, including signed editions. The planned U.S. and Canada leg of the No Secrets Tour was cancelled following Jessie J's announcement that she would need to undergo a second surgery after her breast cancer diagnosis. She explained that while the surgery was "nothing too serious", it coincided with the originally scheduled tour dates, leading to the postponement of the UK and European shows to April 2026 and the refund of all U.S. tickets. Alongside the announcement, she confirmed the rescheduled UK and European leg of the No Secrets Tour for the following spring, with original tickets remaining valid.

=== Singles and music videos ===
Jessie J debuted "No Secrets" as the lead single of Don't Tease Me with a Good Time, on 25 April 2025. On 16 May, "Living My Best Life" served as the album's second single. The third single, "Believe in Magic", was released on 29 August, while the fourth single "H.A.P.P.Y" was released on 31 October alongside its music video. Jessie J released "I'll Never Know Why" as the album's last single on 28 November. "Feel It on Me" and "I Don't Care" received a lyric visualiser and music video, respectively. In 2026, Jessie J released three more music videos for the songs "Comes in Waves", "Threw It Away" and "California".

== Reception ==
Professional ratings
Review scores
Source	Rating
Riff Magazine	8/10
Stereoboard	4/5 stars

In a review for Riff Magazine, Mike DeWald noted that the album is "mature and self-assured", and regarded it as one of Jessie J's more complete records. He also commented that, despite her "formidable voice in pop and R&B", she had struggled to carve out a distinct space in the United States, concluding that the album ultimately "finds it". Stereoboard's Issy Herring described the record as Jessie J's strongest work to date, noting that while its sixteen-track length may feel "slightly excessive, even in the age of streaming", the album ultimately affirms her as a songwriter with emotional clarity as well as a "breathtaking" vocalist.

Don't Tease Me with a Good Time debuted at number 19 on the UK Albums Chart. The album became her fourth release to enter the chart, following her three previous albums. (Note: Who You Are (2011), which peaked at number 2, Alive (2013), which peaked at number 3, and Sweet Talker (2014), which peaked at number 4.) In Scotland, the album peaked at number 27 on the Scottish Albums Chart.

== Track listing ==
Standard edition
No.	Title	Lyrics	Music	Producer(s)	Length
1.	"Feel It on Me"	Jessica Cornish; Jesse Boykins III	Boykins	Boykins; Los Hendrix	2:30
2.	"I Don't Care"	Cornish; Boykins	Boykins	Boykins; Los Hendrix	4:30
3.	"No Secrets"	Cornish; Boykins	Boykins	Boykins; Los Hendrix	3:09
4.	"If I Save You"	Cornish; Boykins	Boykins	Boykins; Los Hendrix; Mike Woods	2:39
5.	"Believe in Magic / Joy (Interlude)"	Cornish; Boykins	Cornish; Boykins	Los Hendrix; Dixson	4:33
6.	"Comes in Waves"	Cornish; Boykins	Cornish; Boykins	Boykins; Ray Brady; Nathan Foley	3:13
7.	"I'll Never Know Why"	Cornish; Marty Rod; Ryan Tedder	Rod; Tedder	Marty Maro; Tedder	3:52
8.	"Sonflower"	Cornish	Cornish	Varren Wade	2:35
9.	"Complicated"	Cornish; Kennedi Lykken	Cornish; Lykken	Tedder	3:04
10.	"Colourful"	Cornish; Boykins; Darius Dixson	Boykins; Dixson	Boykins; Los Hendrix; Dixson	2:39
11.	"Threw It Away"	Cornish; Rod; Tedder	Tedder	Marty Maro; Tedder	2:31
12.	"For This Love"	Cornish; Boykins	Boykins	Boykins; Bueno; T Stewart; Aspene Taylor	2:46
13.	"California"	Cornish; Tedder	Tedder	Marty Maro; Tedder	2:41
14.	"Living My Best Life"	Cornish; Andrew DeRoberts; Rod; Tedder	Rod; Tedder	Marty Maro; Tedder	2:57
15.	"H.A.P.P.Y"	Cornish; Rod; Tedder	Rod; Tedder	Marty Maro; Tedder	2:29
16.	"The Award Goes To"	Cornish	Cornish	Boykins; Woods; Patrick McManus	3:22
Total length:					49:30

== Credits and personnel ==
Credits were adapted from the liner notes and Tidal.

=== Recording locations ===
- Peacetree Studio; Studio City, California (1–3, 10)
- Woods House; Los Angeles, California (4)
- Republic Records Studios; Los Angeles, CA (4, 16)
- Metropolis Studios; London, UK (5–6, 12)
- Patriot Studios; Los Angeles, California (7, 11, 14–15)
- Capitol Studios; Hollywood, California (7, 15)
- United Recording; Los Angeles, California (11, 15)

=== Personnel ===
- Jessie J – vocals
- Itai Shwartz – mixing (1–6, 8, 12, 16)
- Yianna AP – mixing (7, 9, 11, 15)
- John Kercy – mixing (10)
- Serban Ghenea – mixing (13, 14)
- Joe LaPorta – mastering

== Charts ==
Chart performance
Chart (2025)	Peak position
Scottish Albums (OCC)	27
UK Albums (OCC)	19

== Release history ==
List of release dates and formats
Region	Date	Format	Label	Ref.
Various	28 November 2025	CD; digital download; LP; streaming	Darco Artist Partnerships	
