= Gareth Mitchell =

Welsh technology journalist and broadcaster

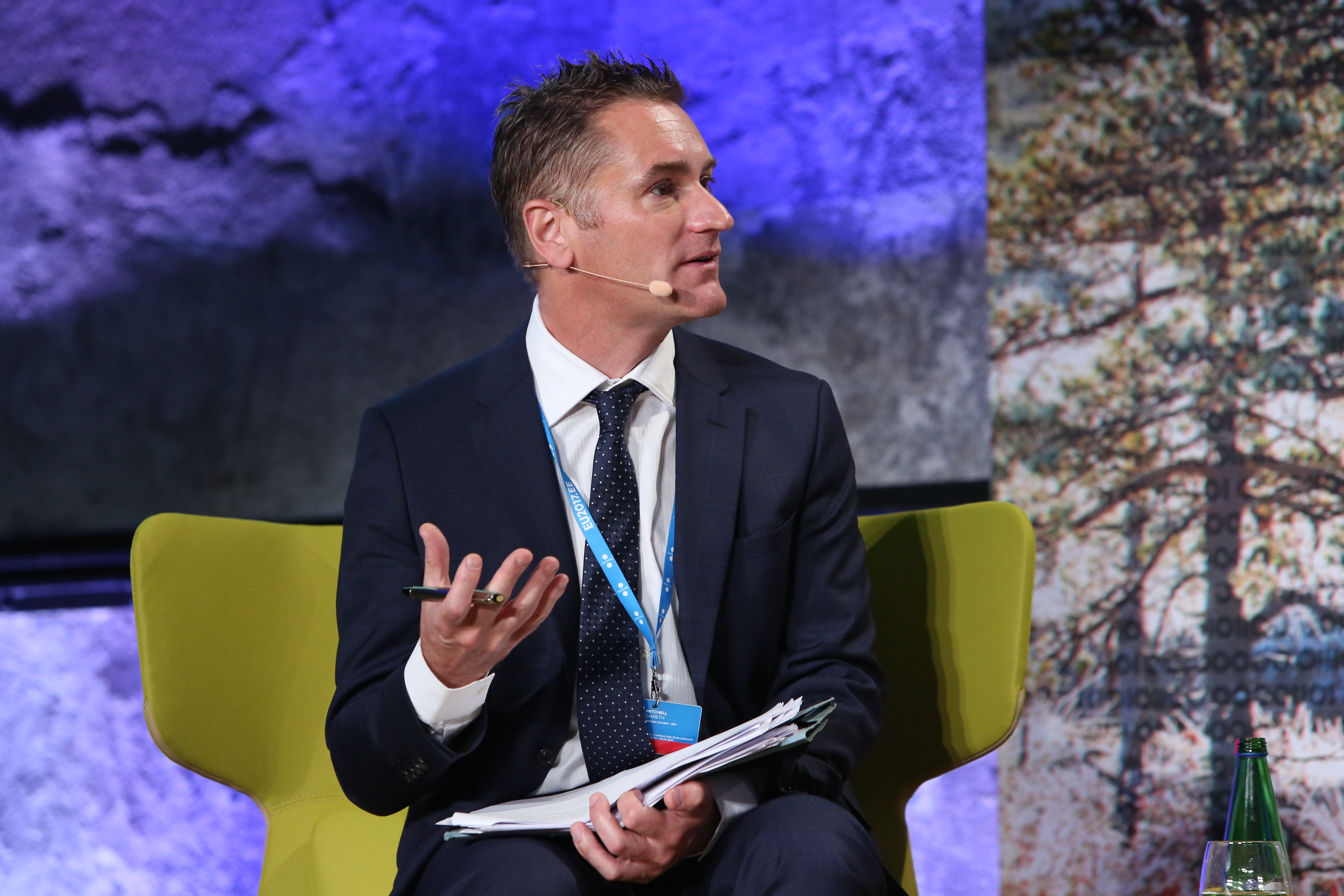
- Gareth Mitchell in Tallinn (2017)
- Born: 15 August 1970 (age 55); Eastleigh, England
- Occupations: Technology broadcaster, science communicator
- Gareth Mitchell's voice recorded January 2014
- Website: Twitter, Facebook (official)

Gareth Mitchell is a Welsh technology journalist, lecturer and former broadcast engineer.

== Early life ==
Mitchell was born Gareth James Mitchell in Eastleigh, England to a Welsh father, Colin Mitchell. He spent his childhood in Montgomeryshire, Powys, Wales. When Gareth was seven, his father lit up a bulb with a closed circuit, and that sparked his interest in science.

He was a member of the computer society at school (Welshpool High School) and participated in bellringing and organ playing at his local church. As an undergraduate studying Electrical and Electronic Engineering at Imperial College London, Mitchell joined campus radio working behind the scenes, but saw that "[t]he people who seemed to be having all the good fun were the creative types in the studios." Because of that, after getting his engineering degree and relevant work, he took up an MSc in Science Communication, also at Imperial.

== Broadcasting ==
Mitchell joined the BBC during the mid-1990s, starting his career as a broadcast engineer. His initial dream was to be part of Tomorrow's World, BBC's flagship technology TV programme, but a visit to a radio studio at Bush House got him obsessed about radio journalism. Mitchell eventually decided to trade climbing TV and radio transmitter towers for science and technology journalism. He had worked for Radio Netherlands on science programmes.

His first hosting role on the BBC was for the youth science program, The Lab. Occasionally, he had also presented Science in Action and The Science Hour on the BBC World Service, and reported on the television programme Click.

He presented on the BBC most notably as the host of Digital Planet (previously known as Click and Go Digital) a BBC radio programme broadcast worldwide on the BBC World Service with Bill Thompson until its end in March 2023. During his time on the show he interviewed people such as Jimmy Wales, Stephen Fry, Professor Dame Wendy Hall, Martyn Ware, Feargal Sharkey, Jean Michel Jarre and Vint Cerf. From time to time, he is a stand-in presenter for BBC Inside Science on BBC Radio 4. Additionally, Mitchell wrote for the Q&A section of BBC (Science) Focus Magazine and hosted the Q&A podcast from 2008 to 2017.

After the end of Digital Planet, in April 2023, Mitchell and Thompson returned with a new technology podcast, The Gareth and BillCast as well as Mitchell presenting ""Somewhere on Earth: The Global Tech Podcast"

== Lecturing ==
Mitchell has lectured at Imperial College London since 1998 in broadcast and written journalism on the Science Communication and Science Media Production MSc programmes since 2000 and 2002 respectively. He also presents the Imperial College Podcast. The key event leading to his appointment as a radio tutor was a bet in a pub over a Guardian job advertisement for that role.

He emceed TEDx Imperial. He has attended the World Economic Forum and has hosted workshops, discussion panels and conferences on science and technology.

At Imperial he has cofounded, and now runs, the "Science Media Diversity Scholarship". The award covers tuition fees and London living costs for a year, for a student from a minority ethnic group. The Science Media Diversity Scholar also completes an internship at one of the sponsoring television production companies.

== Facilitator ==
As well as broadcasting and lecturing Mitchell is a host and facilitator at big events with clients such as the European Commission, OECD, World Economic Forum, Wellcome Trust, and Nesta.

== Personal life ==
Apart from the bells and the organ, other instruments Mitchell can play are the piano and keyboard. He rides motorcycles, has taken flying lessons, and has been a licensed amateur radio operator since August 2019. with his call sign M7GJM. He continues to use his engineering skills by for example has developing a way to provide the required signal needed for the studio clocks he'd bought at an auction for items from Bush House, the BBC World Service's former headquarters, he did this by making a Master clock from a microcontroller called an Arduino.
