= Sapsford =

Sapsford is a surname. Notable people with the surname include:

- Danny Sapsford (born 1969), English tennis player
- George Sapsford (1896–1970), English footballer
- Paul Sapsford (1949–2009), New Zealand rugby player
- Roland Sapsford, New Zealand politician
- Tom Sapsford (born 1975), British ballet dancer and choreographer
