= The Net (British TV series) =

British TV series

- Country of origin: United Kingdom
- Original language: English

Original release
- Release: 1994 – 1998

The Net is a TV series made by Illuminations for the BBC and shown from 1994 to 1998. It ran for four series, beginning with a premiere episode broadcast on BBC2 on 13 April 1994, produced by Stephen Arkell, edited by John Wyver, and with reportage by Rajan Datar and Susan Rae, a discussion of audio design for games by Thomas Dolby, and a 5-minute segment with IT expert Davey Winder explaining how to dial into Internet services of the time like Compuserve and CIX.

The focus of the programme was primarily the Internet explosion of the time, though it also dealt with other emerging technologies and series one had a computer games review section. The series was responsible for one of the BBC's earliest efforts at establishing an online presence, when the BBC Networking Club launched a website to coincide with the first episode and a BBS named "Auntie" later in 1994.

Following viewer complaints, the games review was dropped for series two – which began on 15 May 1995 – and replaced with a Hotlist segment. It was felt that games reviews were already well catered for by other programmes, such as Channel 4's GamesMaster and that they did not really fit into The Net.

The third series began on 13 January 1997 with episode run-time extended from thirty to forty minutes.

The final series started on 2 March 1998 in which Net Guide replaced the Hotlist segment.
