= Famigo =

Former technology company

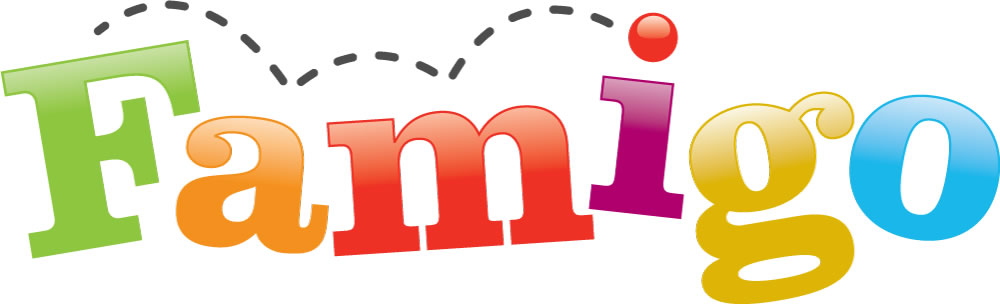
- Industry: Mobile app rating
- Headquarters: Austin, United States

Famigo is a defunct Austin, Texas-based company that provided a directory of child- and family-friendly applications for mobile devices, as well as a parental control app for the Android operating system. The company raised $1 million in funding. The company is no longer active and the website has been taken over by another company.

== History ==
Q Beck founded Famigo in the fall of 2009, and was the CEO. The Austin Technology Incubator, an Austin-based start-up resource, helped launch Famigo.

Famigo raised $1 million for its app-directory and parental control software. Silverton Partners, Zilker Ventures, Liahona Ventures, and Capital Factory helped fund the initiative.

== Awards and recognition ==
In 2011, CNET named Famigo Sandbox (the parental control app) the Best App for Parents. PC Pro named Famigo Sandbox one of the 25 best Android apps. Time magazine's tech section named Famigo Sandbox one of "The 10 Best Android Games for Kids".
