= Click (TV programme) =

2000 British TV programme

- Also known as: Click Online (2000–05)
- Genre: Review show
- Presented by: Stephen Cole; Spencer Kelly; Kate Russell; Lara Lewington
- Country of origin: United Kingdom
- Original language: English
- No. of episodes: 1,296

Production
- Production locations: BBC Pacific Quay, Glasgow
- Running time: 30 minutes (approx.)
- Production company: BBC News

Original release
- Network: BBC News (UK feed); BBC News (international feed); BBC Two
- Release: 6 April 2000 – 22 March 2025

Related
- Digital Planet

Click, originally Click Online, is a BBC television programme which was broadcast between 6 April 2000 and 22 March 2025, covering technology news and developments in the world of technology and the Internet. Its first presenter was Stephen Cole. Its final presenters were Spencer Kelly and Lara Lewington.

Since its debut on 6 April 2000, it broadcast a new episode every week, marking its 1,000th episode on 6 July 2019. In October 2024, the channel announced it was to axe the programme after 25 years, alongside its interview show HARDtalk. Spencer Kelly, the lead presenter of the programme, later confirmed on social media that he had “filmed his final piece for the programme”. This episode was broadcast on 15 March 2025, with the programme's final episode airing a week later.

A successor to the show, Tech Now, launched on 29 March 2025.

== Format ==
Each episode was introduced by the presenters, Spencer Kelly and Lara Lewington, and featured reports about technology developments all over the world by a group of BBC contributors. Reports covered a variety of 'tech' subjects, including consumer technologies and issues, social impact of emerging technologies, video games, and innovations in mobile technology.

The last shows featured a "Week in Tech" segment, compiling the week's biggest news in the technology area.

The programme previously included Webscape, a closing segment hosted by Kate Russell recommending new and useful websites. This segment was dropped but Russell continued doing general reporting for the show.

There were different editions of the programme, two 30-minute programmes (shown on UK feed of BBC News channel), a global edition (international feed of BBC News channel), and a 15-minute version (BBC One and UK feed of BBC News channel during BBC Breakfast). A four-minute version also appeared on BBC World News at varying times of the week.

BBC World Service used to broadcast a weekly sister radio show, Digital Planet, which, for a time, shared the same name. This ended in March 2023. It was presented by Gareth Mitchell and contributors Bill Thompson, Ghislaine Boddington and Angelica Mari.

=== Local versions ===
Persian-speakers were also able to watch BBC Persian Click online and on BBC Persian TV presented by Nima Akbarpour. Further local versions were launched from Autumn 2018, including Click Tamil in October 2018, with the aim of having the show broadcast in up to 20 languages.

== History ==
The show started as Click Online in April 2000, hosted by Stephen Cole, and featured reports focused on the rise of the Internet and related technologies. Thursday, 29 December 2005 marked the last edition of Click Online, as the show was previously known, coinciding with the departure of Stephen Cole after 295 shows. The programme was thereafter renamed Click, with new music and titles, and with Spencer Kelly, an existing reporter and producer on the show who also compiled reports for The Gadget Show on Channel 5, as the new host. From then, it expanded its "online" focus, featuring reports on technology developments from all over the world. From April 2020, existing reporter Lara Lewington became co-host.

Episode 774 was the world's first programme to be shot and edited entirely on mobile devices.

The 12 March 2016 programme (#827) was broadcast in 360 degrees, and is the first entire episode of a TV programme to be broadcast as such.

On 6 July 2019, the show's 1000th episode was broadcast. It consisted of an interactive episode where viewers could decide what to watch next.

In March 2021, the BBC announced that the technology department, including Click, would be relocating to Pacific Quay in Glasgow. The show stopped producing new episodes during April 2022 to facilitate the move, with repeats shown, and aired the first episode produced on Glasgow on 7 May 2022.

=== Botnet controversy ===
In 2009, the show and the BBC created some controversy when it aired a special episode highlighting the dangers of botnets and how easy it was to get caught in one. The show bought control of a botnet of some 22,000 infected computers (for "a few thousand dollars") from a Russian hacker, and used it to send spam to an email address set up for the experiment and to perform a Distributed Denial of Service (DDoS) attack on a website set up by Prevx (an internet security company that provided technical support for the show). After the programme was made the computers on the botnet were sent a piece of software to remove the malware and a warning was sent to them telling the users what had happened and that they were vulnerable.

The response was mixed, with the show receiving many emails both for and against the programme along with some negative press. The BBC was criticized by some legal consulting organisations as well as computer security companies. Computer security expert and senior technology consultant at Sophos, Graham Cluley, asked in his blog whether the BBC was breaking the Computer Misuse Act - which makes it an offence in the UK to access or modify a third-party computer without the owner's consent. However internet security commentator Melih Abdulhayoğlu, founder of international computer security company Comodo Group, made a video in support of the BBC. Click rebutted criticisms by stating in its Twitter posts that:

We would not put out a show like this one without having taken legal advice.

== Presenters and reporters ==
In addition to presenters Kelly and Lewington, reporters included LJ Rich, Paul Carter, Marc Cieslak, Zoe Kleinman, Nick Kwek, Shiona McCallum, Alasdair Keane and Kitty Knowles. Former reporters include Dan Simmons, Omar Mehtab, Jen Copestake and Chris Fox.

Previous presenters of the show have included Stephen Cole who left the BBC to work for Al Jazeera International. Kate Russell left in August 2020 after 14 years being part of the Click team.

Other BBC journalists occasionally presented segments of the programme.
