= Lara Lewington =

British television presenter

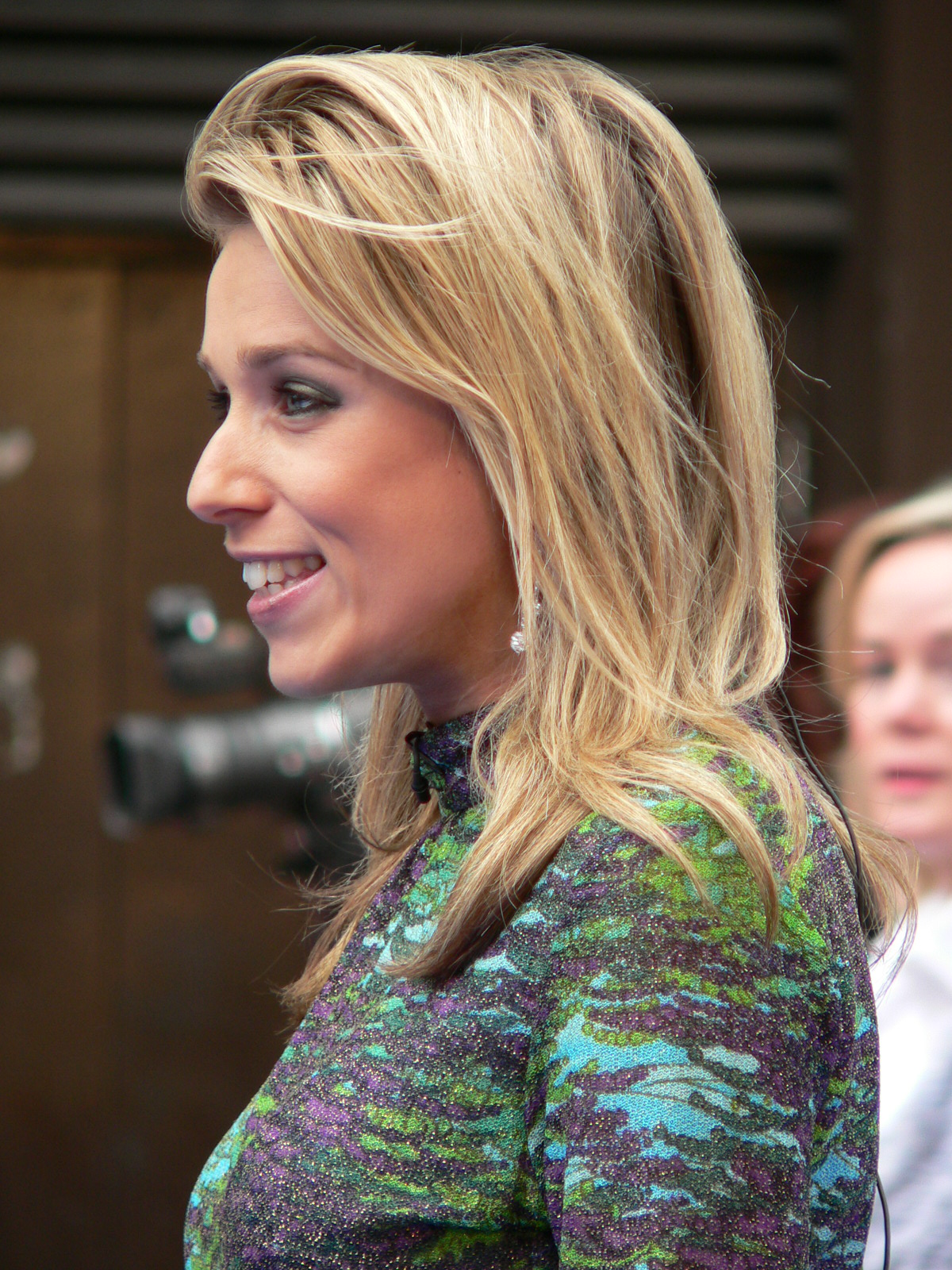
- Lara Lewington on 28 May 2006
- Born: Danielle Lara Lewington; 10 May 1979 (age 47); Chichester, West Sussex, England
- Occupation: Television presenter
- Spouse: Martin Lewis (m. 2009)
- Children: 1

Danielle Lara Lewington (born 10 May 1979 in Chichester, West Sussex) is a British television presenter, journalist and former weather presenter. She co-presented the BBC's technology programme Click.

== Early life ==
Lewington is Jewish. She attended Surbiton High School, an independent school in Surbiton, Greater London. She studied at St Mary's University, Twickenham. She reports working as a runner on the game show It's a Knockout while at the university.

== Career ==
=== Television ===
Lewington joined Five in January 2003, as their weather presenter. She spent six years at the channel, also becoming the showbiz correspondent for Five News, before a stint as showbiz correspondent on Sky News.

She contributed to various shows including The Weakest Link News and Weather special, ITV1's Celebrities Exposed and E!'s 101 Greatest programmes. She has also appeared weekly on ITV's The Impressionable Jon Culshaw, was a panellist on ITV's Win, Lose or Draw, and has appeared on BBC Two's Newsnight, Channel 4's RI:SE, Big Brother's Big Mouth, ITV's Britain's Best Dish, the BBC's Let's Dance For Sports Relief and appeared as one of the four representatives of Five TV on the BBC One Sport Relief Superstars special.

Lewington joined BBC's Click in 2011 as a reporter and later became a presenter in 2018. She co-presented the show with Spencer Kelly and appears on other radio and television shows talking about technology. She has also been the technology columnist for Woman magazine. In July 2023, she presented the BBC Radio Four programme Wiki Wars, on editing on Wikipedia. Jimmy Wales spoke on this programme. It discussed issues such as hoaxes on Wikipedia, sociological research suggesting gender bias on Wikipedia, geographical bias on Wikipedia and paid editing.

In September 2023, Lewington announced a new role as AI Agony Aunt to the Lorraine programme on ITV.

=== Film ===
Lewington can be seen presenting the weather on a background monitor in the Daily Planet newsroom in the 2006 film Superman Returns. She appeared in the British comedy feature film Shouting Men (2010) and BBC2's Happiness.

=== Other ===
In July 2025, Lewington's book Hacking Humanity: How technology can save your health and your life was released.

== Personal life ==
Lewington married financial journalist and broadcaster Martin Lewis, who is also Jewish, in 2009. They have one daughter, born in 2012.
