= Darien Graham-Smith =

British journalist, scholar and thespian (born 1975)

Darien Graham-Smith is a British journalist, scholar and thespian. He was born in London in 1975.

Graham-Smith holds the title of Associate Editor at the British periodical PC Pro, published monthly by Dennis Publishing, where he is responsible for coverage of technical issues ranging from microprocessor architecture to operating systems. Since 2008, Graham-Smith has been producer of and a regular contributor to the PC Pro Podcast. He also contributes technology reviews to the British newspaper The Daily Telegraph.

He is an occasional contributor to the news media, appearing on the BBC News channel in December 2008 to discuss security weaknesses in Internet Explorer and as a featured expert on three series of For Love or Money. Graham-Smith is also a co-presenter of the Open University's 2010 introduction to computing module, entitled "Inside the Box", alongside the BBC's Spencer Kelly.

Prior to entering journalism, Graham-Smith studied English literature at Trinity College, Cambridge before progressing to specialise in Victorian literature at the University of Wales, Bangor, where he holds his doctorate and where he was, from 2000 to 2002, editor in chief of university newspaper Seren. While at the University of Cambridge, he was also the assistant editor of Graduate Varsity.

Academically he is best known for his research into the works and ideas of Lewis Carroll in the context of the broader Victorian intellectual tradition. His Ph.D. thesis Contextualising Carroll was published by the University of Wales. He is also notable for his involvement in independent theatre: Achievements include co-writing The Cat Must Die, which The Times named critics' choice at the 2002 Edinburgh Fringe Festival, and directing the South London Theatre's 2005 production of A Doll's House by Henrik Ibsen.

Graham-Smith married journalist, scholar and performing arts manager Dr Lise Smith in 2015; the couple has one daughter, Scarlett.
