= Ghislaine Boddington =

British artist

- Born: 1962 (age 63–64)
- Known for: Creative director of body>data>space, curator and presenter worldwide on her research 'The Internet of Bodies'.
- Website: bodydataspace.net

Ghislaine Boddington (born 11 October 1962) is a British artist, curator, presenter and director specialising in body responsive technologies, immersive experiences and collective embodiment, pioneering it as 'hyper-enhancement of the senses' and 'hyper-embodiment' since the late 80s.

== Career ==
Coming from a performing arts background, she has focused on the blending of the virtual and physical body through converging telepresence, sensors, motion capture, wearables, gesture interfaces, biofeedback, robotics, virtual worlds and mixed realities into experiential environments.

Boddington is a creative director and co-founder of body>data>space, an interactive design collective emerging from shinkansen, and Women Shift Digital. She coined the term 'The Internet of Bodies' as part of her research which she keynotes internationally, she is a reader in digital immersion at the University of Greenwich, a Fellow of the Royal Society of Arts, and Artist Research Fellow at ResCen, Middlesex University. She sits on the advisory board of AI & Society journal by Springer and consults for the creative industries sector, particularly working with Nesta as a co-curator of FutureFest (2015-2018).

Boddington is co-presenting tri-weekly for BBC Digital Planet (formerly Click), the BBC World Service radio technology programme, and was in 2017 awarded the IX Immersion Experience Visionary Pioneer Award by the Society for Arts and Technology (SAT).

== Curations ==
- FutureFest (2015 – 2018), co-curation with Pat Kane for Nesta. Curation themes led by Boddington were Future Machines (2015), Future Love (2016) and Alternative You (2018). FutureFest is the flagship festival by Nesta (UK).
- FutureFest Forward (2018). A series exploring artificial intelligence in relationship to society, work and creativity for Nesta (UK).
- The Games Europe Plays (2016), Boddington as curator with partners EUNIC London, The Finnish Institute in London, FutureFest and University of Greenwich (UK). A series of exhibitions, events and talks focusing on independent games made in Europe, envisioning future scenarios in which gaming experiences are at the centre of work and play.
- Women Shift Digital (2013 – date), co-curation in collaboration with body>data>space (UK). A network designed to celebrate women in digital creative careers.
- E-motional – Bodies and Cities (2011 – 2013), co-curation in collaboration with Gabriela Tudor Foundation (Lead Organiser, RO) and partners body>data>space (UK), Dublin Dance Festival (IRL), The Association of Professional Dance Choreographers in Latvia (LAT), and Dance House Lemesos (CY). E-motional was a mobility and artistic exchange for contemporary dance gathering artists and managers from six European countries. Supported by EU Culture Programme (2007–13).
- MADE Mobility for Digital Arts in Europe (2010-2012), co-curation in collaboration with Centre des arts d’Enghien-les-Bains (Lead Organiser, FR) and partners body>data>space (UK), Transcultures (BE) and BoDig (TU). The project implemented and promoted European objectives for artist mobility within the digital arts. Supported by the EU Culture Programme (2007-2013).
- Robots and Avatars – Our Colleagues and Playmates of the Future (2009 – 2014), Boddington as lead curator in collaboration with body>data>space (Lead Organiser, UK), KIBLA (SI), AltArt (RO) and with support from FACT (UK). The project looked at emergence of the European (virtual/physical) citizen and examined the multi-identity evolutions and virtual mobility. Commissions included Blind Robot by Louis Philippe Demers (2012). Supported by EU Culture Programme (2007–13).
- Robots & Avatars – Our Colleagues of the Future? (2009 – 2011), Boddington as lead curator in collaboration with body>data>space (UK) and Nesta (UK). The programme envisioned the skill-sets, aptitudes, resources and methodologies that will be required by young people at work in 2020 onwards.
- Virtual Physical Bodies (2009), Boddington as co-curator in collaboration with body>data>space (UK). The exhibition at Centre des arts in Paris, which explored the questions of the virtual/physical body within public space.
- Post_Me-New_ID (2007 – 2009), Boddington as lead curator in collaboration with body>data>space (Lead Organiser, UK), KIBLA (SI) and TMA | Trans Media Academy (UK). The project looked to examine the complexity of 21st century European human identity, exploring the evolution of cyborg culture through technologies of the body. Supported by EU Culture Programme (2007-2013).
- Future Physical (2002 – 2004), Boddington as lead curator in collaboration with shinkansen (UK). A pioneering large-scale commissioning cultural programme exploring the changing boundaries between the virtual and the physical, placing the body at the centre of digital interaction with conferences and programmes of work on wearable computing, smart textiles, biotechnology, ecotechnology and responsive environments. Supported by Arts Council England.
- Future Physical Commissions (2002 – 2004). Boddington as lead curator in collaboration with shinkansen (UK). Commissions and international co-productions of new work included: foam (tx0om); Sara Diamond (Code Zebra); Masaki Fujihata (Field-Works/Mersea Circles); Thecla Schiphorst and Suzan Kozel (whisper); Joseph Hyde (RememberMe); Ruth Gibson and Bruno Martelli (dotdotdot); kondition pluriel – Martin Kusch and Marie Claude Poulin (scheme II); Sophia Lycouris, Yacov Sharir and Stan Wijnans (Intelligent City); People Like Us / Vicki Bennett (Remote Controller); Jane Prophet and Neil Theise (Cell); Isabel Rocamora (Memory Release); Tom Sapsford and Daniel Glaser (Hypnos); Stanza (genomixer); Rachel Wingfield (Digital Dawn); Sheron Wrey and Fleeta Siegal (Texterritory).
- Virtual Incarnations (1997 – 2002), co-curation in collaboration with shinkansen (UK) for Dance Umbrella festival(UK). Programme of dance and technology shows and installations at the Institute of Contemporary Arts (ICA), Southbank Centre, Barbican Centre and other venues in London, including works by Merce Cunningham.
- Virtual Physical Bodies (1999), Boddington as lead curator in collaboration with shinkansen (UK). A conference at ResCen, Middlesex University, focused on the integration of the live body into virtual and physical blended space and exploring the creation of cyber dancers. Participants included Thecla Schiphorst, Yacov Sharir and Wayne McGregor with Random Dance Company.
- Connectivity Discussion Forum (1996-1998), co-curation in collaboration with shinkansen (UK). Monthly debate series and online discussion forum for performance artists, producers and net artists at Backspace London.
- Sound Works Exchange (1994 – 1997), Boddington as lead curator in collaboration with shinkansen (UK). Performances, workshops, debates and recordings between music and sound artists from the UK and Germany. Amongst the participating artists were Pete Namlook, Asmus Tietchens, Christina Kubisch, Mixmaster Morris, Zoviet France, People Like Us and Thomas Köner. Supported by the Goethe-Institut and British Council.
- Bare Essentials – Gender Mayhem (1992–1993), Boddington as lead curator in collaboration with shinkansen (UK). Performance seasons examining non-binary and gender shifting themes for ICA Live Arts in London.
- Voice Over Festival (1990-1991), co-curation in collaboration with shinkansen and Serious. A London wide festival focussing on voice and the living body, featuring Meredith Monk, Le Mystère des Voix Bulgares and Diamanda Galás amongst others.

== Directed Works ==
- Collective Reality - experiencing togetherness (2016), in collaboration with body>data>space. Collective Reality was an immersive installation using motion tracking, surround sound and projection mapping to create generative environment experienced by groups in real-time. The installation was commissioned by Nesta’s FutureFest and The University of Greenwich.
- me and my shadow (2012), in collaboration with Joseph Hyde and Phill Tew. This installation was an immersive telepresence experience consisting of separate portals between London, Paris, Istanbul and Brussels, connecting participants’ avatars through a shared online environment. The installation was commissioned by MADE Mobility for Digital Arts in Europe project (2010-2012) and supported by the National Theatre in London.
- Dare we do it Real Time? (2009). Performance exploring the use of realtime tools by artists specialising in performance, video, sound, virtual worlds and interaction. Commissioned by Post_Me-New_ID project (2007 – 2009) and supported by Kinetica Art Fair London.
- Ideasphere (2004 – 2005), in collaboration with body>data>space. Large inflatable spheres, which acted as projection screens for digital human images enabling a 3D effect for the imagery. These spheres were installed outside the Big Chill Bar off Brick Lane, at Late at the Tate and Glastonbury Festival (UK).
- The Litmus Effect – Artist Links (2003), in collaboration with Stanza and Armand Terruli. The project consisted of experiments in sensitivity interactions between humans, data and space, examining the potential collaborations between public and private space in large cities using interactive technologies. Supported by Artist Links, British Council Shanghai.
- skintouchfeel (2002 – 2006), in collaboration with body>data>space. The project consisted of an ongoing group creation process examining the notion of the body and gender, intimacy and empathy within digital immersion. The project was presented at Digi-Cultures Nottingham (2005), Glastonbury Festival (2007) and Cybersonica Late at the Tate Britain (2007).
- Cluster (2000–2004), in collaboration with shinkansen (UK). A programme of events aimed towards integrating dance and music performances into web casting, exploring intimacy and tele-intuition.
- CellBytes (2000–2001), in collaboration with shinkansen (UK). A workshop-based research series investigating the body, live presence and telepresence, using interactive remote stages between Arizona State University and Middlesex University.
- Corpos Online (2000). Telepresence workshop for Portuguese and EU dance and creative technologists held at Lugar Commun in Lisbon, which was part of CellBytes series, initiated by shinkansen and supported by the Ministry of Culture Portugal and the British Council.
- Club Research (1995–1997), in collaboration with shinkansen (UK). A bi-monthly series of interdisciplinary events taking live art, video, telepresence and MJs’ (movement jockeys) into club culture with DJs Mr. C and Hospital Records at The End nightclub in London.
- Butterfly Effect (1991–1996). Pioneer artist/producer network for the performing arts and technologists from five European countries with an annual residency European Choreographic Forum held as part of Dartington International Summer School, residencies and commissions. Supported by EU Task Force and Arts Council England.
- Vinyl Requiem by Philip Jeck and Lol Sargent (1991–1993): Integrated music/film experience co-produced with Time Festival Gent, Institute of Contemporary Arts (ICA), Glasgow City of Culture, Theater an der Wien and Sony Music Belgium. Premiered at Union Chapel (with ICA) in London and at Time Festival Gent and toured in the United Kingdom, Austria and Belgium. Supported by Arts Council England.
