= This Christmas Day =

Studio album by Jessie J
- Released: 26 October 2018
- Recorded: August 2018
- Genre: Christmas
- Length: 35:01
- Label: Republic
- Producers: Babyface; David Foster; Darkchild; Marvin Hemmings; Jimmy Jam and Terry Lewis; John Jackson; Antonio Dixon; Courtney Ballard; Kuk Harrell; Demonte Posey; David Nathan

Jessie J chronology
R.O.S.E. (2018)	This Christmas Day (2018)	Don't Tease Me with a Good Time (2025)

This Christmas Day is the fifth studio album and first Christmas album by English singer Jessie J, released by Republic Records on 26 October 2018. The album, a follow-up to her four-part fourth studio album R.O.S.E. which had been released earlier that year, marked the singer's first Christmas album. Recording took place, at short notice, in both Europe and Los Angeles in August 2018. This Christmas Day consists of eleven tracks, featuring ten cover versions of Christmas standards and carols, two of which are duets featuring recording artists Babyface, and Boyz II Men, and one original song.

Upon release, the album earned a mixed reception from music critics who were impressed with Jessie J's vocals and the work of her team of producers such as David Foster, Rodney Jerkins, and Jimmy Jam and Terry Lewis, but found that the singer was overselling and the classic material on the album lacked originality. On the charts, This Christmas Day was unsuccessful and only debuted and peaked at number 48 on the US Top Holiday Albums.

== Background and release ==
Throughout the summer, she embarked on the R.O.S.E. Tour, playing summer shows and festivals, but was looking for a different project "as a thank-you to fans for their support and to celebrate how great this year has been." In July 2018, Republic Records greenlit the recording of a Christmas album. The album was released on 26 October.

== Recording ==
Much of the album was recorded in two weeks around the tour, in both Europe and Los Angeles. Jessie J stated that her decision to create the album was "very last minute", and that working with producers such as David Foster, Kenneth "Babyface" Edmonds, Rodney Jerkins and Jimmy Jam and Terry Lewis on the album was a "dream come true". Apart from her cover versions of Christmas standards and carols, Jessie J wrote "This Christmas Day" for the album, its only original song, produced by Jerkins. The song was inspired a friend of Jessie J who had lost her brother.

== Critical reception ==
Professional ratings
Review scores
Source	Rating
AllMusic	3/5 stars
The Guardian	3/5 stars
The Times	3/5 stars

AllMusic editor Neil Z. Yeung called the album "a collection of faithful renditions of beloved Christmas classics. Soothing and nostalgic, the 11-song set pairs big-band glitz and jazzy swing with a '90s R&B touch [...] As Christmas albums go, This Christmas Day benefits from Jessie J's powerful vocals and inspired arrangement from her team of iconic producers. Much like Kylie Minogue's Kylie Christmas or Mariah Carey's Merry Christmas, This Christmas Day is pleasant, wintry fun for pop fans in need of updated takes on songs they already know by heart." Vulture critic Craig Jenkins felt that This Christmas Day "is solid, but it missed a chance to be cool" and added: "It might surprise you that the album these collaborations landed on is mostly a drippy collection of melismatic readings of Christmas standards."

Ben Beaumont-Thomas, writing for The Guardian, remarked that "flanked with beautifully arranged backings that emphasise the 'big' in big band, you initially worry she oversells these standards [...] Every note, no matter how short, is spritzed with earnest vibrato, and also occasionally toasted with vocal fry. But if your Christmas involves a 12 ft illuminated Santa on the lawn, eggnog on the breakfast table and red glitter on everything, you will find much to love here." Connor Ratliff from Rolling Stone called This Christmas Day "jazzy and professional", but noted: "There is an aspect to a record like this that feels like it is exactly what people hate about Christmas music – the same 10 songs being modernized by 20 new artists every year, in more or less the same way."

In 2022, Billboard listed This Christmas Day as the 15th Best Christmas Albums of the 21st Century.

== Commercial performance ==
This Christmas Day debuted and peaked at number 48 on the US Top Holiday Albums. The second track from the album, "Man with the Bag", managed to peak at number 70 on the UK Singles chart.

== Track listing ==
This Christmas Day track listing
No.	Title	Writer(s)	Producer(s)	Length
1.	"Santa Claus Is Comin' to Town"	Haven Gillespie; J. Fred Coots	David Foster	3:07
2.	"Man with the Bag"	Dudley Brooks; Irving Taylor; Hal Stanley	Courtney Ballard; Kuk Harrell	2:43
3.	"Rockin' Around the Christmas Tree"	Johnny Marks	Darkchild; Marvin Hemmings^{[a]}	2:19
4.	"Jingle Bell Rock"	Joseph Beal; James Boothe	Darkchild; Marvin Hemmings^{[a]}	2:39
5.	"Rudolph the Red-Nosed Reindeer/Jingle Bells"	Marks; James Pierpont	Jimmy Jam and Terry Lewis; John Jackson	4:21
6.	"Let It Snow"	Julius Stein; Sammy Cahn	Jimmy Jam and Terry Lewis; Jackson	2:05
7.	"Winter Wonderland" (featuring Boyz II Men)	Richard B. Smith; Felix Bernard	Babyface; Antonio Dixon; Demonté Posey	2:43
8.	"The Christmas Song" (featuring Babyface)	Robert Wells; Mel Tormé	Babyface; Dixon	4:05
9.	"This Christmas Day"	Jessica Cornish; Rodney Jerkins	Rodney Jerkins	3:45
10.	"White Christmas"	Irving Berlin	Babyface; David Nathan^{[c]}	3:26
11.	"Silent Night"	Joseph Mohr	Foster	3:48
Total length:				35:01

=== Notes ===
- ^{^[c]} indicates a co-producer.
- ^{^[a]} indicates an additional producer.

== Personnel ==
Credits were adapted from Tidal.

=== Musicians ===
- Jessie J – vocals (all tracks), background vocals (track 1)
- Brian Bromberg – bass (1, 3, 4)
- Andrew Synowiec – guitar (1, 3, 4)
- Alan Pasqua – piano (1, 3, 4)
- Peter Erskine – drums (1)
- Jochem van der Saag – programming, synthesizer (1)
- Darren Williams – drums (2)
- Tommy Emmerton – guitar (2)
- Rob Barron – piano (2)
- Dave Bishop – saxophone (2)
- Howard McGill – saxophone (2)
- Paul Booth – saxophone (2)
- Robert Fowler – saxophone (2)
- Sammy Mayne – saxophone (2)
- Ade Hallowell – trombone (2)
- Andy Wood – trombone (2)
- Callum Au – trombone (2)
- Mark Nightingale – trombone (2)
- Andy Greenwood – trumpet (2)
- Si Gardner – trumpet (2)
- Tom Rees-Roberts – trumpet (2)
- Tom Walsh – trumpet (2)
- Rodney "Darkchild" Jerkins – programming (3, 4, 9, 10); organ, piano (9)
- Chris Walden – conductor (3, 4, 9)
- Jamey Tate – drums (3, 4)
- Nomad – guitar (3, 4)
- Adama Schroeder – saxophone (3, 4)
- Dan Higgins – saxophone (3, 4)
- Jeff Driskill – saxophone (3, 4)
- Kevin Garren – saxophone (3, 4)
- Sal Lozano – saxophone (3, 4)
- Andrew Lippman – trombone (3, 4)
- Bob McChesney – trombone (3, 4)
- Charlie Morillas – trombone (3, 4)
- Julianne Gralle – trombone (3, 4)
- Dan Fornero – trumpet (3, 4)
- Kevin Richardson – trumpet (3, 4)
- Kye Palmer – trumpet (3, 4)
- Willie Murillo – trumpet (3, 4)
- Rob Gueringer – guitar (3)
- Lauren Evans – background vocals (4–6, 9, 10)
- Andrae Alexander – background vocals (4, 9, 10)
- Carmen Echols – background vocals (4, 9, 10)
- Elizabeth Komba – background vocals (4, 9, 10)
- James Logan – background vocals (4, 9, 10)
- Jarrett Johnson – background vocals (4, 9, 10)
- Matthew Johnson – background vocals (4, 9, 10)
- Nikki Leonti – background vocals (4, 9, 10)
- Sharon Youngblood – background vocals (4, 9, 10)
- John Jackson – keyboards (5, 6)
- Jimmy Jam – keyboards, programming (5)
- Babyface – programming (7, 8); saxophone, vocals (8)
- Paul Boutin – percussion (7, 8)
- Antonio Dixon – programming (7, 8)
- Demonté Posey – programming (7), conductor (8)
- Reggie Hamilton – upright bass (7), bass (8)
- Greg Phillinganes – piano (7)
- Boyz II Men – vocals (7)
- Andre Delano – saxophone (8)
- Gerald Heyward – drums, percussion (9)
- Alisha Bauer – cello (9)
- Ben Lash – cello (9)
- Cecilia Tsan – cello (9)
- Mike Kaufman – cello (9)
- Brian Dembrow – viola (9)
- Erik Rynearson – viola (9)
- Jonathan Moerschel – viola (9)
- Phillip Triggs – viola (9)
- Andrew Bulbrook – violin (9)
- Bruce Dukov – violin (9)
- Cara Pool – violin (9)
- Christian Hebel – violin (9)
- Grace Oh – violin (9)
- Luanne Homzy – violin (9)
- Marisa Kuney – violin (9)
- Marisa Sorajja – violin (9)
- Mark Robertson – violin (9)
- Paul Henning – violin (9)
- Phil Levy – violin (9)
- Sarah Thornblade – violin (9)
- Deneille Wilson – cello (10)
- Ifetayo Ali-Landing – cello (10)
- Joshua Zajac – cello (10)
- Tahirah Whittington – cello (10)
- DaJuan Brooks – clarinet (10)
- Christian Dillingham – double bass (10)
- Gaby Vargas – flute (10)
- Amy Kruger – French horn (10)
- Anna Jacobson – French horn (10)
- Jeremiah Frederick – French horn (10)
- Michael Maganuco – harp (10)
- Keith Bjorklund – oboe (10)
- Justin Boyd – percussion (10)
- David Nathan – piano (10)
- Benjamin Dickson – viola (10)
- Caitlin Adamson – viola (10)
- Danielle Taylor – viola (10)
- Adrianne Urban – violin (10)
- Alexandria Hill – violin (10)
- Ana Bolvi – violin (10)
- Angelica D'Costa – violin (10)
- Caitlin Edwards – violin (10)
- Clayton Penrose-Whitmore – violin (10)
- Kyle Dickson – violin (10)
- Lucinda Ali-Landing – violin (10)
- Olya Prohorova – violin (10)
- David Foster – keyboards (11)

=== Technical ===
- Jochem van der Saag – mixing (1)
- Rupert Christie – mixing, engineering (2)
- Jaycen Joshua – mixing (3–10)
- Jorge Vivo – mixing (11)
- Andrew Dudman – engineering (2)
- Courtney Ballard – engineering assistance (2)
- Kim Lumpkin – production coordination (3, 4, 9, 10)

== Charts ==
This Christmas Day chart performance
Chart (2018)	Peak position
UK Albums Sales (OCC)	92
US Top Holiday Albums (Billboard)	48

== Release history ==
Region	Date	Format(s)	Label	Ref.
Various	26 October 2018	CD; digital download; streaming	Republic	
