= Real Deal (song) =

Single by Jessie J

from the album R.O.S.E.
- Released: 11 August 2017
- Studio: MDDN Studios (Burbank, California)
- Genre: R&B; hip hop
- Length: 4:14
- Label: Republic
- Songwriters: Shuggie Otis; Jessica Cornish; Darhyl Camper
- Producers: DJ Camper; Kuk Harrell

Jessie J singles chronology
"Man with the Bag" (2015)	"Real Deal" (2017)	"Think About That" (2017)

"Real Deal" is a song by English singer and songwriter Jessie J. It was written by Shuggie Otis, Jessie J and Darhyl Camper, with production handled by DJ Camper and Kuk Harrell. The song was released on 11 August 2017 through Republic Records. The single is a part of a campaign with M&M's, and is the lead single from her compilation album R.O.S.E.

== Background ==
Jessie partnered with M&M's and Incredibox to unveil the song. Fans are able to unlock a hidden snippet of the song after playing a game on "Bite Size Beats", an interactive beat box platform. She also teased stills from an unspecified music video shoot. She told Forbes that this single is not taken from an upcoming album, she also tweeted: "First single? Nah... This is me just getting warmed up." The song later appeared on her fourth studio album, R.O.S.E.

== Composition ==
"Real Deal" represents a musical departure for the singer, veering away from the "power-pop vibes" of her previous music, and instead is based on old school hip hop and R&B. Jessie J described the single as having a "summer vibe." Mike Wass of Idolator wrote that the song contains a "distinct hip hop edge." The single's production contains hard-hitting drums.

== Critical reception ==
Rap-Up called the song "a thumping production with hard-hitting drums", and felt that "the soulful siren blesses the head-knocking track with infectious melodies and optimistic lyrics about a promising romance". Mike Wass of Idolator described the song as "a rhythmic bop with a distinct hip-hop edge" and "a radical change of pace for the Brit", and wrote that it lacks "power-pop vibes" from previous singles "Bang Bang" and "Burnin' Up". Similarly, Katrina Rees of CelebMix opined that the track "takes us in a slightly new musical direction" and "veers away from her classic powerful pop sound".

== Credits and personnel ==
Credits adapted from Tidal.

- Jessie J – songwriting, vocals
- Shuggie Otis – songwriting
- Darhyl Camper – songwriting, production, programming
- Kuk Harrell – production
- Simone Torres – engineering
- Iván Jiménez – assistant mixing
- David Nakaji – assistant mixing
- Jaycen Joshua – mixing
