= Shinkansen (collective) =

Sound and movement research based in London

shinkansen (1989–2004) was an East London sound and movement research, development and production unit focusing on body technology integration by facilitating connectivity between dance, performance, music, video and digital technologies.

The shinkansen collective developed an early practice-led research model, taking artist-led innovation into the mainstream. It conceived and produced projects in the United Kingdom and internationally, integrating artists, creatives and technologists from a diverse range of cultural and specialist backgrounds by developing early European networks of performing artists and digital creatives. shinkansen initiated early experiences of interdisciplinary creation, with and alongside interactive digital tools, and was experimenting with early concepts of telepresence.

The collective annually delivered curations at the Institute of Contemporary Arts in London and for Dance Umbrella, produced, lead commissions and directed workshops, laboratories and residences, all focussed on the integration of dance and technology.

The work of shinkansen was acquisitioned by the British Library in 2004. The archive includes over 800 documentation tapes of performances, installations and debates, held at the British Library as The shinkansen Collection.

shinkansen was a partnership between Ghislaine Boddington and Debbi Lander who co-owned the company from 1991 - 2004. After shinkansen produced the landmark turntable piece, Vinyl Requiem (1993) it became a revenue funded organisation of Arts Council England. In 1994 shinkansen left East London and moved to Bloomsbury in the West End. The multimodal poet, performance writer, and professor at Miami University in Oxford, Ohio, cris cheek is one of the co-founders.
