= BBC WebWise =

- Website type: Learning
- Available in: English (UK)
- Owner: BBC
- Website: http://www.bbc.co.uk/webwise (part offline)
- Commercial: No
- Registration: Was required for official course content
- Launched: 1998
- Current status: Online, but for some parts, offline

BBC WebWise is the BBC's archived guide to the Internet for computer novices, and a collection of videos. Created in 1998, it consisted and on the archive, consists of a series of articles and videos. It also incorporates elements of another BBC website, BBC raw computers. All BBC websites are required to link to WebWise when using content which requires a plug-in.

== History ==
BBC WebWise was created in 1998 to encourage new users to explore the internet, as part of a wider BBC campaign which included TV and radio programmes. By December 1999 it consisted of articles, columns, a blog, message boards and a Q&A section. A wide range of freelance writers were attached to the project, including Charlie Brooker and Bill Thompson (resident columnist with WebWise until 2008).

In 2004, WebWise launched a 10-hour accredited course, called Becoming WebWise.

== Current features ==
WebWise was completely redesigned and relaunched in September 2010, with articles on a variety of computer-related subjects written by well-known technology writers such as Bill Thompson, Wendy M. Grossman and Jack Schofield. It formerly contained new courses, and also has a weekly column, and a large A to Z of technical terms.
