= H.A.P.P.Y =

Single by Jessie J

from the album Don't Tease Me with a Good Time
- Released: 31 October 2025
- Studio: Capitol Studios (Hollywood, California); United Recording (Los Angeles, California)
- Length: 2:29
- Label: Jessie J
- Composers: Ryan Tedder; Marty Rod
- Lyricists: Jessica Cornish; Ryan Tedder; Marty Rod
- Producers: Ryan Tedder; Marty Maro

Jessie J singles chronology
"Believe in Magic" (2025)	"H.A.P.P.Y" (2025)	"I'll Never Know Why" (2025)

Music video
- "H.A.P.P.Y" on YouTube

"H.A.P.P.Y" is a song by English singer Jessie J. It was released on 31 October 2025 through her own independent label under license to Darco Artist Partnerships (D.A.P), as the fourth single from her sixth studio album, Don't Tease Me with a Good Time (2025).

== Background and release ==
"H.A.P.P.Y" appears as the fifteenth track on Jessie J's sixth studio album, Don't Tease Me with a Good Time (2025). It was written by Jessie J, Ryan Tedder and Marty Rod, and produced by Tedder. In the single's press release, Jessie explained the word "happy" carries different meanings for different people, but that spelling it out in song felt "right and good" to her, as she wanted listeners to feel a sense of joy. She added that, in what she described as a "heavy" and often sad world, she hoped the song and its accompanying video would offer "a little taste of light and fun", creating a family-friendly moment that could bring people together, which she described as the purpose of music.

== Live performances ==
Jessie J performed "H.A.P.P.Y" prior to its release at her show on The Town festival in São Paulo, Brazil, on 13 September 2025. She later performed the song live on The Graham Norton Show on 29 November.

== Music video ==
A music video for "H.A.P.P.Y" was directed by Mitch Peryer, released on 31 October 2025. It features Jessie J dancing on set with her son, wearing vibrant, multicoloured outfits.

== Personnel ==
Credits were adapted from Tidal.

- Jessica Cornish – vocals, lyrics
- Ryan Tedder – composer, lyrics, producer
- Marty Maro – composer, lyrics, producer
- Joe LaPorta – mastering engineer
- Yianni AP – mixing engineer

== Charts ==
Chart (2025)	Peak position
UK Singles Downloads (OCC)	93

== Release history ==
List of release dates and formats
Region	Date	Format(s)	Label	Ref.
Various	31 October 2025	Digital download; streaming	Jessie J; D.A.P.	
