= Robots and Avatars =

Robots and Avatars was a programme of events and educational activities which explores how young people will work and play with new representational forms of virtual and physical life in 10–15 years time. It was produced by body>data>space with support from NESTA. between 2009 and 2012.

The project examined multi-identity evolutions of younger generations within the context of a world in which virtual and physical spaces are increasingly blended. A participatory web and events led programme with connected educational activities took taking place across 2010 and onwards, in the UK and internationally. The project included contributions by a diverse range of experts, professionals and specialists working with robots and avatars including Professor Noel Sharkey (Professor of Artificial Intelligence and Robotics and Professor of Public Engagement University of Sheffield), Pear Urishima (Apple), Ghislaine Boddington from body>data>space and Derek Richards from Hi8us South.

== Robots and Avatars Forum ==
Robots and Avatars launched in November 2009 with a Forum at NESTA, attended by an international group of 80 experts, professionals and young people in London.

== Robots and Avatars Lunch Debates ==
Between June and November 2010 the programme hosted a series of Lunch Debates exploring Artificial Intelligence, Behaviour and Ethics, Health and Wellbeing and the Future Workplace with expert provocateurs and top level thinkers.

== The Overall Programme ==
The programme continued throughout 2010–2011 with educational events, an exhibition, a website, vodcasts with key experts and a book/DVD.

== Themes ==
Robots and Avatars explored a wide range of themes including:

- Robots
- Avatars
- Future World of Work and Education
- Identity
- Gaming
- Gaming in Education
- Artificial Intelligence
- Virtual Worlds
- Performance
- Telematics
- New media art
- Popular Culture
