= Net (magazine) =

British internet and web design magazine

- Cover of the final issue (June 2020)
- Editor: Steven Jenkins
- Categories: Internet
- Frequency: Monthly
- Circulation: 12,703 Jan-Dec 2016
- First issue: December 1994 (as .net)
- Final issue Number: June 2020; 332
- Company: Future plc
- Country: United Kingdom
- Language: English
- Website: www.creativebloq.com/net-magazine

net was a monthly print magazine that published content on web development and design. Founded in 1994, the magazine was published in the UK by Future plc. It was widely recognized as the premiere print publication for web designers.

The magazine was initially aimed at the general Internet user, but was adapted into a title aimed at professional web designers and web developers under the editorship of Dan Oliver. Its sister publication, the design-focused Creative Bloq blog, was launched by Dan Oliver in 2012, and is estimated to receive over two million monthly readers according to analytics firm SimilarWeb.

The magazine, and its parent Future plc, were also known for their annual The Net Awards, which was an awards body recognizing outstanding achievements in the web development industry. The magazine ended publication in June 2020.

== History ==
The magazine was founded in 1994, originally titled as ".net", with the first issue appearing in December. Its then editor was Richard Longhurst and assistant editor was Ivan Pope. It was initially aimed at the general Internet user in the early days of the internet and World Wide Web gaining wider momentum. Regular contributors included Bill Thompson and Davey Winder.

In 2001, Haymarket Media Group closed its competing internet magazine The Net and sold the subscriber list and the rights to the masthead of the magazine to Future in exchange of Future's football title Total Football, subsequently Future absorbed The Net into .net.

In August 2006 (Issue 152), the magazine was redesigned to include a new themed cover design and a new inner layout. Other changes were the addition of a new section at the back of the magazine called Trash replacing comics by drew and the Hi! Monkey Soon after the redesign a column entitled Web Drifter was introduced; written by Martin Sargent, it usually contained issues and language considered vulgar by the readership, and it was subsequently cancelled.

Also in August 2006, the Penny Forum section was removed but reinstated for issue 153 onwards due to large reader response to its removal. Another addition was Web Pro in the latter half of the magazine. This is sectioned into several topics (web security, careers, search engine news and web hosting) and written by industry professionals. There is also a web FAQ section.

In December 2013 (issue 248), it was re-badged as net to end confusion with Microsoft's .NET Framework, which launched in 2002. Along with the name change, the magazine was given the tagline "The voice of web design".

Future announced in April 2020 that it would cease publication due to commercial reasons caused by COVID-19 pandemic with issue 332 (June 2020) being the last.

== Net Awards ==
The ".net" brand was known throughout the web development industry for its long-running annual The Net Awards, which awards outstanding achievements in the field. The awards recognized the new talent, trends, and technologies that had pushed the web forward over the previous twelve months, as well as recognizing outstanding contributions by established individuals and companies. The annual judging panel was made up of notable industry veterans and thought leaders.

Categories included Agency of the Year, Individual Outstanding Contribution, Developer of the Year, and Best Collaborative Project. Notable past winners include BBC News (redesign of the year), Dropbox (mobile app of the year), Old Spice (viral campaign of the year), Flickr (mobile site of the year), and Jeffrey Zeldman (web standards advocate).

The annual voting process began with a public nominations phase. In 2015 alone, over 1,000 nominee considerations were submitted. These were whittled down to ten nominees per category by the award's judging body. Next, a public voting phase occurred to allow for community impact to play a role in each project's consideration. Finally, the judges weighed in to determine the winners of each category. Awards were given out live at the year-end ceremony in London.

== Conference ==
net launched its Generate Conference in 2014. The event consisted of a single-track, two-day series of speeches and workshops presented by prominent individuals in the web design industry.

The inaugural conference took place in London, with Shopify and Badoo acting as featured sponsors. The 2015 conference took place in New York City, with Media Temple acting as the featured sponsor.

Past speakers included Dan Cederholm (of Dribbble), Jake Archibald (of Google Chrome), Remy Sharp (of Polyfill), Ethan Marcotte (of responsive web design), and Elliot Jay Stocks (of Adobe Typekit).
