= (Everybody's Waitin' for) The Man with the Bag =

Christmas song by Irving Taylor

Song
- Written: 1950
- Genre: Christmas music
- Songwriters: Irving Taylor, Dudley Brooks, Hal Stanley

"(Everybody's Waitin' for) The Man with the Bag" is a Christmas song written in 1950 by Irving Taylor, Dudley Brooks, and Hal Stanley. The "man with the bag" is a reference to Santa Claus, who drops off presents from his sleigh to people who have been "extra special good".

The song was originally made popular by Kay Starr and regularly appeared on Billboard's list of most popular Christmas songs in the early 1950s.

Hal Stanley was Kay Starr's husband at the time. He had an interest in a club in South-Central Los Angeles where Dudley Brooks often performed, and had collaborated with Irving Taylor on several television projects. He brought the two together, took credit as a co-writer, and published it under his and Starr's publishing company, StarStan.

== Jessie J version ==
"Man with the Bag"

Single by Jessie J

from the album This Christmas Day
- Released: 8 November 2015
- Studio: Abbey Road Studios (London, England); The Madden Brothers Studio (California)
- Genre: Christmas
- Length: 2:43
- Label: Republic
- Songwriters: Hal Stanley; Dudley Brooks; Irving Taylor
- Producer: Kuk Harrell

Jessie J singles chronology
"Sorry to Interrupt" (2015)	"Man with the Bag" (2015)	"Real Deal" (2017)

"Man with the Bag" is a cover song of "(Everybody's Waitin' for) The Man with the Bag" was recorded by British singer Jessie J. It was first released on 8 November 2015 through Republic Records as a single, and then later included on her Christmas album This Christmas Day.

The song peaked at number 70 on the UK singles chart, becoming the 38th biggest Christmas songs of the 21st century in the United Kingdom as of 2023, being certified silver by BPI.

=== Background and release ===
Jessie J first recorded a cover of "(Everybody's Waitin' for) The Man with the Bag" for an advert for Boots during Christmas 2015. The version was later included on the singer's fifth studio album, This Christmas Day and published as the lead single in October 2018.

The song charted on the UK Singles Chart at number 70 in 2020 and number 85 in 2021. It 2022 it was certified Silver by the British Phonographic Industry (BPI) in 2022.

=== Critical reception ===
Ben Beaumont-Thomas, writing for The Guardian, praised the vocal technique of the singer on the cover. In 2022 Billboard also highlighted "the opportunity to flex her vocal muscles" on the song for Jessie J. In 2024 Cosmopolitan listed Man with the Bag as the 67th Best Christmas Songs of All Time.

=== Charts ===
Weekly chart performance for "Man with the Bag"
Chart (2015–2020)	Peak position
South Korea International (Circle)	79
UK Singles (Official Charts)	70

=== Certifications ===
Certifications for "Man with the Bag"
Region	Certification	Certified units/sales
United Kingdom (BPI)	Silver	200,000^{‡}
^{‡} Sales+streaming figures based on certification alone.

== Other versions ==
The song has been covered by many artists, including The Brian Setzer Orchestra. Jane Monheit recorded the song for her 2005 album The Season, and performed it on her 2019 holiday tour. Seth MacFarlane recorded the song for his 2014 album, Holiday for Swing. The song has also been covered by Voctave, a central Florida a cappella group.

The TV show Ally McBeal borrowed the song's title for a December 11, 2000 episode that featured Vonda Shepard singing the song. Her version was included in the holiday album Ally McBeal: A Very Ally Christmas. The album received positive reviews, and several critics cited Shephard's version of the song as the album's highlight.

Darren Criss and Adam Lambert performed a duet of the song for Criss' 2021 album, A Very Darren Crissmas. Hannah Waddingham performed a duet of the song for the 2023 Apple TV+ special Hannah Waddingham: Home For Christmas. Jschlatt performed the song for the 2025 deluxe edition his album A Very 1999 Christmas. Pentatonix (featuring säje) covered the song in 2026 for the deluxe edition of their Christmas album Christmas in the City.
