= No Secrets (Jessie J song) =

2025 single by Jessie J

Single by Jessie J

from the album Don't Tease Me with a Good Time
- Released: 25 April 2025
- Studio: Peacetree Studio (Studio City, California)
- Length: 3:09
- Label: Jessie J
- Songwriters: Jesse Boykins III; Jessica Cornish
- Producers: Los Hendrix; Jesse Boykins

Jessie J singles chronology
"Heaven Bound" (2023)	"No Secrets" (2025)	"Living My Best Life" (2025)

Lyric video
- "No Secrets" on YouTube

"No Secrets" is a song by English singer Jessie J. It was released on 25 April 2025 independently through her own label Jessie J Records, as the lead single from her sixth studio album, Don't Tease Me with a Good Time.

== Background ==
Elle described "No Secrets" as drawing from one of the most vulnerable periods in Jessie J's life. In 2021, the singer suffered a miscarriage—an experience she later said almost broke her—while simultaneously performing six consecutive live shows in Los Angeles. The song captures the emotional aftermath of that loss and how it ultimately transformed her. After experiencing the pregnancy loss, Jessie welcomed her first son, Sky, with boyfriend Chanan Safir Colman two years later. "No Secrets", her first independent single, reflects on that dark period, while also opening the door to how motherhood has since brought new light into her life.

In an interview with People, Jessie spoke about the overwhelming support she received following the release of the song on April 25, her first major release in about four years. "Honestly, the amount of love is so overwhelming," she said. "There's always that little voice that's just like, 'Do people care? Do people want it?' And there's just been so much joy and excitement." Shortly after the release, Jessie revealed via Instagram that she had been diagnosed with early-stage breast cancer prior to the song's debut. "I'm highlighting the word early. Cancer sucks in any form but I'm holding on to the word early", she wrote, sharing the news with fans as part of her ongoing commitment to openness and vulnerability in her music.

== Composition ==
"No Secrets" begins with the line, "I lost my baby / But the show must go on, right?", setting a reflective tone. The song addresses themes of personal loss and perseverance, with Jessie J describing it as a necessary starting point for her return to music after several years.

== Charts ==
Chart performance for "No Secrets"
Chart (2025)	Peak position
UK Singles Sales (OCC)	66
