= Think About That =

Single by Jessie J

from the album R.O.S.E.
- Released: 15 September 2017
- Studio: MDDN Studios (Burbank, California)
- Genre: R&B
- Length: 3:13
- Label: Republic
- Songwriters: Jessica Cornish; Darhyl Camper
- Producer: DJ Camper

Jessie J singles chronology
"Real Deal" (2017)	"Think About That" (2017)	"Not My Ex" (2017)

Music video
- "Think About That" on YouTube

"Think About That" is a song by English singer and songwriter Jessie J. The song was released on 15 September 2017 through Republic Records, as the second single from her compilation album, R.O.S.E. (2018). Four singles from the album were released, with "Think About That" representing realization.

== Composition ==
"Think About That" is an R&B song led by a piano melody hovering over R&B percussion. It lyrically talks about a gritty love gone wrong, containing the lyrics: "All you disturb is my work and my patience/ Years of grinding, you took it, you broke it/ All 'cause you fake it/ You wanna be famous." The singer revealed she wrote the song when she almost quit music, and credits the song for helping her getting "out of a rut with her music."

The singer described her writer's block in a video titled R.O.S.E. Confessional:

I didn’t want to write any new songs, Camper said 'Ok' then before he left the room, he put the beat for ‘Think About That’ on a loop. The lyric and melody just start[ed] falling out of me, and 15 minutes later when he returned, I had a song. He laughed and said 'see.'

— Jessie J, R.O.S.E. Confessional

== Music video ==
A music video for the song was released on the same day. It was directed by Erik Rojas, Brian Ziff and Jessie J. The video opens with the singer with her hands tied, dripping wet. She's soon freed, wearing a fishnet body stocking and a BDSM-esque leather mask. The video then consists of her crawling at the camera and dancing on a dim, smoky street. The video was filmed in black and white, and contains references to BDSM.

== Track listing ==
Digital download

No.	Title	Length
1.	"Think About That"	3:13

== Credits and personnel ==
Adapted from Tidal.

- Jessica Cornish - lead vocals, songwriting
- Darhyl Camper - songwriting, production, programmer
- Simone Torres - engineer
- Jaycen Joshua - mixing
- Iván Jiménez - assistant mixing
- David Nakaji - assistant mixing
- Kuk Harrell - other
