= Spencer Kelly =

British journalist

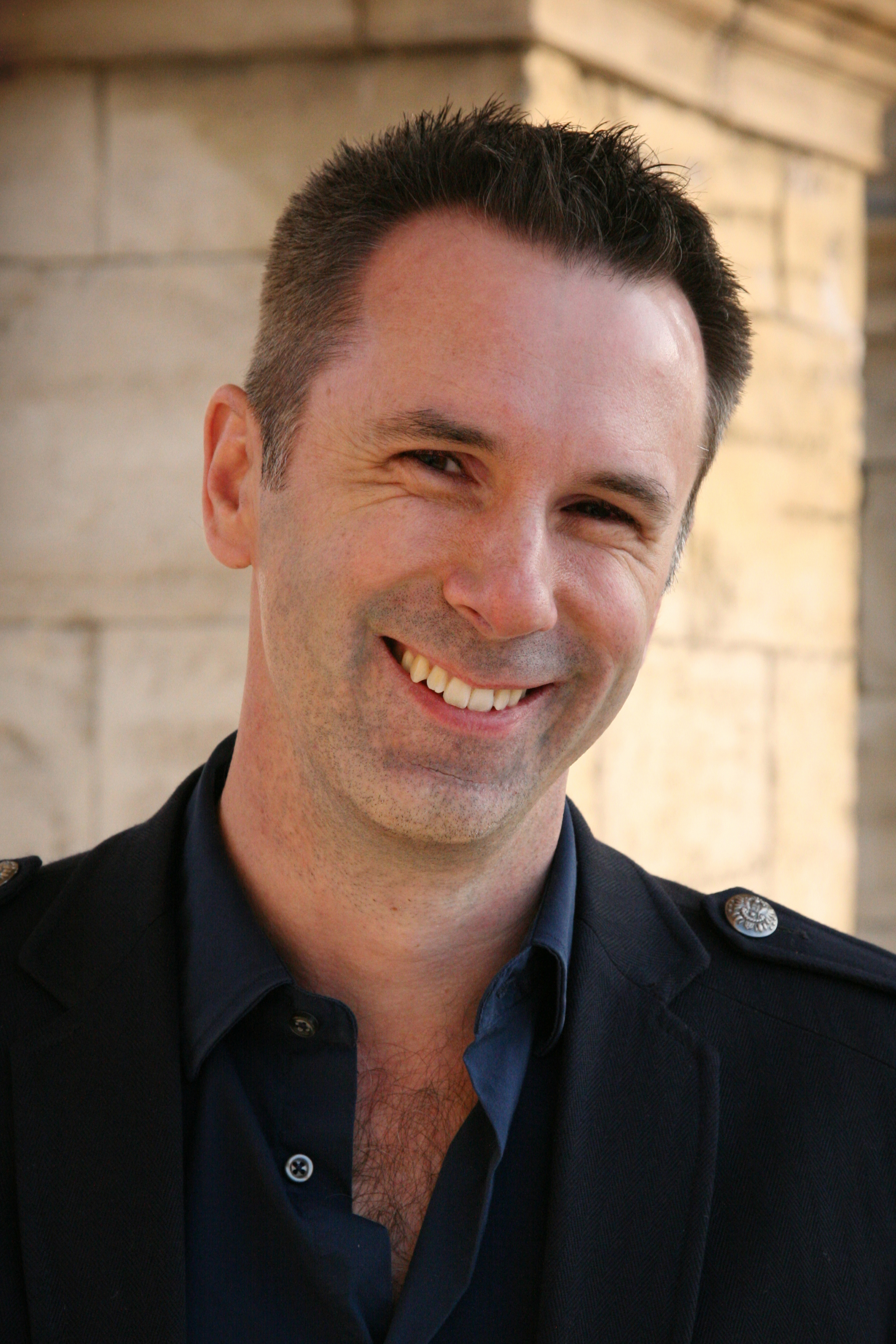
- Spencer Kelly in 2015
- Born: Spencer John Bignell; 5 July 1973 (age 52); Bishopstoke, England
- Education: Wyvern Secondary School; Barton Peveril College
- Alma mater: Churchill College, Cambridge
- Occupation: Television presenter
- Years active: 2003-
- Television: Click
- Children: 2
- Website: www.spencerkelly.com

Spencer Kelly (/ˈspɛnsər/ SPEN-sər; born Spencer John Bignell; 5 July 1973) is a British Television presenter from Bishopstoke, England. He is known for presenting the BBC's technology programme, Click, between January 2006 and March 2025.

== Early life ==
Kelly, then Bignell, grew up in Bishopstoke, near Eastleigh in Hampshire, and attended Wyvern Secondary School in neighbouring Fair Oak, then Barton Peveril College in Eastleigh. He obtained a double first in Computer Science from Churchill College, Cambridge.

== Career ==
=== Radio ===
Kelly was first involved in broadcasting at Radio Glen at Southampton University, and he went on to run Cambridge University Radio. After graduating, he got a job as a traffic presenter, going by the name of "Commander Kelly in the Flying Eye" on the local radio station for Portsmouth and Southampton, Ocean FM. He later became the station's breakfast show host, a position he held for six years.

=== BBC (pre-Click) ===
Kelly joined the BBC in 2003 as one of five iPresenters (interactive presenters). The team pioneered new forms of interactive broadcasting, using the web, digital television and digital radio. This included interactive LiveChats, which were live interviews with celebrities, streamed across the web, in which the audience had the opportunity to ask live questions to the guests.

=== Click ===
Kelly began reporting for BBC World's Click Online show for two and a half years and appeared on Five's The Gadget Show. He became the presenter of the renamed Click series in January 2006, taking over from Stephen Cole. He held the position until the show's end in March 2025.

=== Public speaking ===
Spencer has delivered keynotes on technology topics such as cybersecurity, AI and sustainability and has hosted technology-related panels and roadshows.

== Honours ==
He was awarded an Honorary Doctorate of Technology by Coventry University.
