= Davey Winder =

British internet personality

- Born: David Winder
- Occupation(s): Journalist, writer
- Years active: 1991-present
- Awards: IT Security Journalist of the Year (UK) (2006, 2008, 2010)
- Website: https://happygeek.com

David Winder, commonly known as Davey Winder, is an English IT and Information Security freelance consultant, writer and journalist. He was the 'IT Security Journalist of the Year (UK)' three times, in 2006, 2008 and 2010.

== Biography ==
After viral encephalitis left him severely disabled, he first got a computer to use video games to improve the coordination in the remaining arm in which he had the power of movement. He then used a word processor to learn how to read and write again. After experiments with Prestel, he found an early British online community, CIX, in the late 1980s, before direct connections to the internet were cheaply available outside academia, and this provided him with a new social and business life. Winder was contacted through CIX email over the internet by technological culture writer Howard Rheingold, a habitué of The Well, another early online community-based in the United States, and eventually the two met in person at Winder's home; the meeting is described in Rheingold's book, The Virtual Community.

A prolific author himself, Winder has had more than 20 books published. The most recent, Being Virtual, in conjunction with the Science Museum, in London which explores the realm of virtual identity and is part auto-biographical in nature. Winder is now fully recovered and no longer needs a wheelchair.

Winder has contributed regularly to newspapers and magazines including Computer Weekly, The Guardian, The Times, .net, PC Pro, and Forbes.com.

== Publications ==
- "All you need to know about using the net." Future Publishing, 1994.
- "All you need to know about business on-line." Future Publishing, 1995.
- "Inside the Internet: getting the most from the Net." Future Publishing, 1995.
- "Sex and the Internet." Future Publishing, 1996.
- "Being virtual: who you really are online." Wiley, 2008
