= Stephen Cole (broadcaster) =

British broadcast journalist (born 1954)

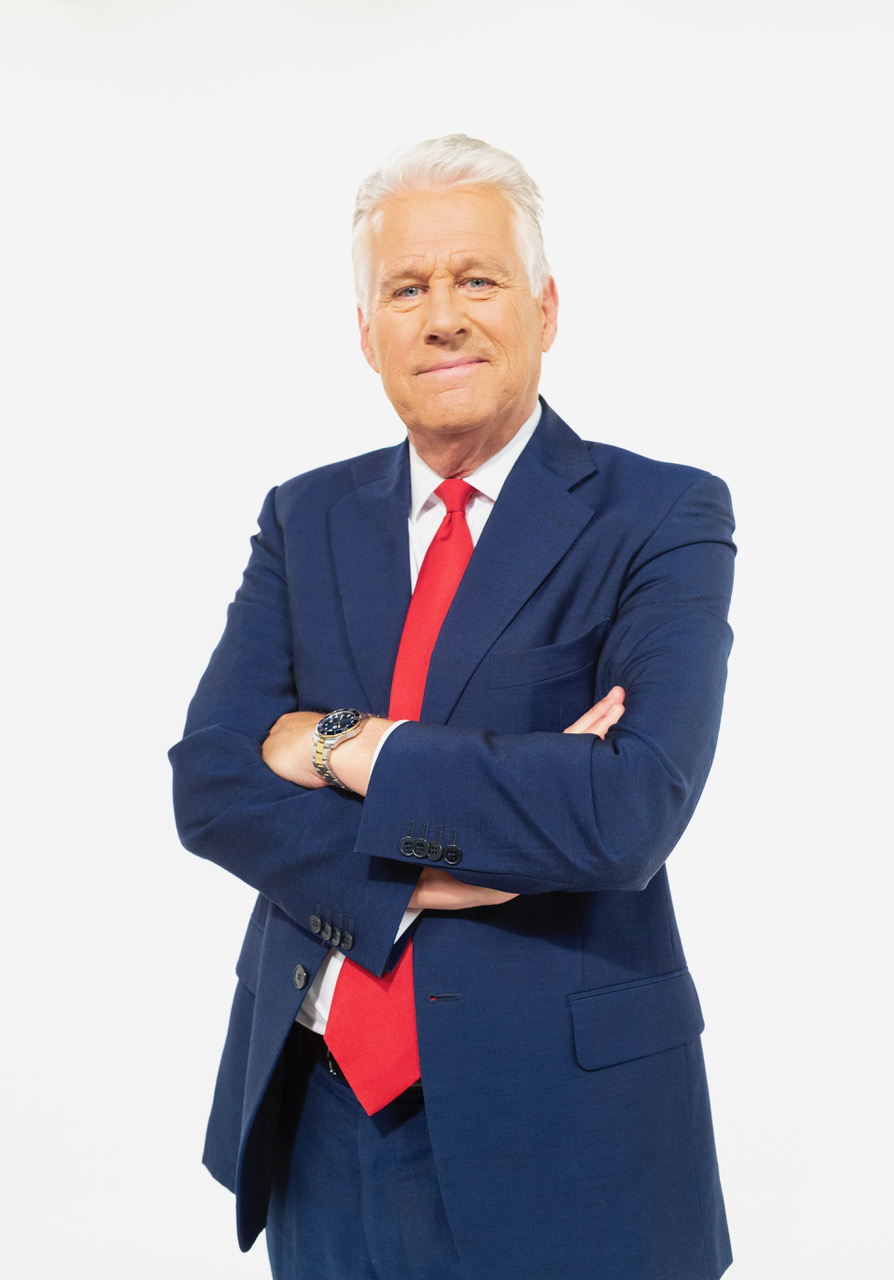
- Born: 29 March 1954 (age 72); Hereford, United Kingdom
- Education: Solihull School
- Occupations: journalist, presenter, newsreader
- Years active: 1974–2022
- Employer(s): ITN, Sky News, BBC, CNN, Al Jazeera, CGTN
- Partner: Ann-Marie
- Children: 3
- Website: http://www.stephen-cole.co.uk/

Stephen Joseph Samuel Cole (born 29 March 1954) is a British journalist, producer, news anchor and television presenter. He was the creative force behind BBC Click and its first host from 2000 to 2006. Cole was also part of the original launch lineup for Sky News in 1989, the revamped CNN International in 1995 and the launch of Al Jazeera English in 2006, as well as anchoring for BBC World News, from 1996-2006.

He is currently a non-executive director of communications agency Brazil.

== Early life ==
Cole was born on 29 March 1954, in Hereford, England, to Brian Cole, a businessman, and Patricia Cole (née Smith), who served in the Women's Auxiliary Air Force (WAAF) during World War II at Bletchley Park, where she was tasked with decrypting Luftwaffe signals. He attended the independent Solihull School. At the age of 19, he received occupational guidance which recommended a career with HM Customs & Excise, in agriculture, or in journalism.

== Career ==
After receiving his National Certificate for the Training of Journalists from Cardiff University, Cole was hired by the Caters News Agency, as a print reporter on national news and sports. His baptism of fire came during the Birmingham pub bombings of 1974. Having been in the city on another assignment the night of the attack, Cole covered the aftermath and the subsequent trials. From 1978 to 1989, Cole broke into television news, filing reports for ITN and BBC Nationwide, where he covered the White House Farm murders.

In 1989, Cole was hired as an anchor for Sky News, the first 24-hour television news channel in Britain, where he reported on the Fall of the Berlin Wall, the dissolution of the Soviet Union, the Gulf War and the Bosnian War.

In 1994, Cole moved to Atlanta, Georgia, to anchor for CNN International, as part of a re-launch and re-branding of the channel.

Returning to the UK in 1996, Cole joined BBC World News as an anchor. In May 2005, 11,000 journalists, producers and technicians went on a one-day strike. As a non-union member under contract Cole was brought in to anchor the flagship Six O'Clock and Ten O'Clock News on BBC1, temporarily replacing regular newsreaders Sian Williams, George Alagiah and Huw Edwards.

In the year 2000, BBC management approached Cole about creating a new show for the network, offering him a choice between business and Information Technology (IT). He chose the latter, and BBC Click Online was born. Growing to reach a global audience in over 100 countries under Cole's tenure as producer and host from 2000-2006, Click Online - since renamed to simply click - recently celebrated its 1,000th episode. Cole interviewed some of the biggest names in tech at the time, including Bill Gates and Larry Ellison.

When Al Jazeera launched its English-language service in 2006, along with other British broadcasters like David Frost, Cole was “quickly snapped up”, as senior anchor and news editor, in part due to the exposure he received during the BBC strike. Cole also reported from the field on meetings of the Group of Seven, the World Economic Forum in Davos, and the black market sale of antiquities in Bulgaria.

From 2019 until his retirement from broadcast television in 2022, Cole was the executive producer and host of The Agenda with Stephen Cole, the flagship current affairs program of CGTN Europe, the Chinese state broadcaster. Since his retirement, Cole continues to work as a guest lecturer, event host and moderator.

== Personal life ==
Cole is a member of the British Academy of Film and Television Arts (BAFTA) and has been a judge in the TV category, and has also hosted the Royal Television Society Technology Awards. He has also chaired the General Conference of UNESCO and hosted the Eurasian Media Forum and the World Innovation Summit for Education in Doha.

A rugby fan, Cole is a supporter of the London Welsh RFC, having previously served as a club Director.
