= Zoe Kleinman =

BBC technology editor

- Education: University of Southampton
- Occupations: Journalist, television presenter
- Years active: 2003–present
- Employer: BBC
- Notable work: BBC Click, Tech Now, Today
- Title: Technology Editor, BBC News

Zoe Kleinman is a British journalist and television presenter who has served as the BBC’s Technology Editor since September 2021. She reports across television, radio, and online platforms on topics including artificial intelligence, cybersecurity, digital regulation, and diversity in technology.

Kleinman’s work has included investigations into the Facebook–Cambridge Analytica data scandal, Elon Musk’s acquisition of Twitter, and the development of generative artificial intelligence. Her reporting has been cited in UK parliamentary hearings, and in March 2025 she gave evidence before the House of Lords on AI governance and data privacy.

== Career ==
Kleinman joined the BBC in 2003 as a web producer and features editor for BBC Two’s Working Lunch and the BBC’s in-house magazine, Ariel. She went on to work as a senior technology reporter and presenter on programmes including Click, Tech Now, BBC World News, and Today on BBC Radio 4.

In 2021, Kleinman was appointed as the BBC’s first Technology Editor, reporting on major technology developments and events, including:

- The 2023 UK Global AI Safety Summit in Bletchley Park, where she interviewed Prime Minister Rishi Sunak.
- UK parliamentary hearings on online harms and content moderation, later cited by a parliamentary committee.
- Interviews with technology leaders such as Apple CEO Tim Cook, Google DeepMind co-founder Sir Demis Hassabis, Microsoft vice-president Brad Smith, and Roblox founder Dave Baszucki.

=== Speaking and public engagement ===
Kleinman has participated in public speaking engagements and panel discussions on technology topics. In 2019, she was a keynote speaker at Roxhill Briefings on technology trends in London. In 2024, she headlined the North East Tech Festival in Newcastle, and served as a panelist on AI ethics at a Royal Academy of Engineering event.
