= Kate Russell (reporter) =

British reporter (born 1968)

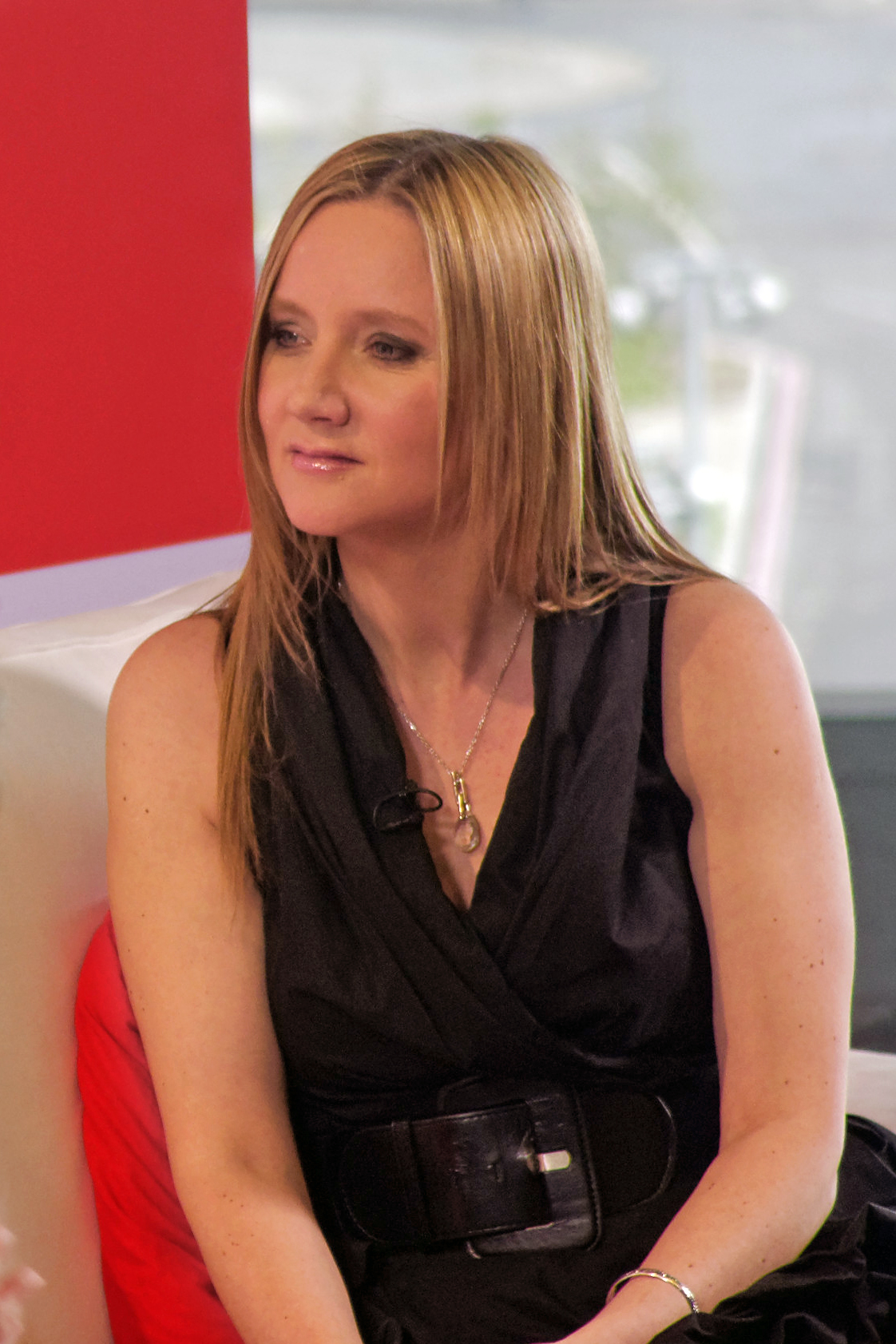
- Russell in 2013
- Born: 22 May 1968 (age 57); Harpenden, England
- Occupation: Technology reporter
- Known for: Webscape on Click

Kate Russell (born 22 May 1968) is an English technology journalist, author and speaker.

== Biography ==
Russell was born on 22 May 1968, in Harpenden. She made her first TV appearance with her family in a pilot episode of the game show, Johnny Ball Games, presented by Johnny Ball. She appeared on children's television in the show Fish and Chips on Nickelodeon in 1995, but moved on to present on technology a few years later, fronting a show called Chips with Everything, on The Computer Channel (later renamed to .tv).

Russell has previously featured regularly on CNBC Europe as both a reporter and producer. She has also appeared on GMTV and The Pod Delusion.

Russell was a freelance reporter on the Webscape segment of the BBC technology show Click, which is broadcast in the UK on BBC News and internationally on BBC World News.

She writes a column called Tech Traveller in National Geographic Traveler magazine. She has previously written columns for Web User, and the Original Volunteers website.

Russell's first published book Working the Cloud (2013) is a collection of tips and resources to help businesses better use the Internet.

She self-published her first short story, Taken (Scary Shorts Book 1), as a trial of Kindle Direct Publishing on 5 August 2011.

Russell's second book and first novel Elite: Mostly Harmless (2014), a story set in the Universe of the Elite computer games, was the result of a successful Kickstarter campaign which raised over 400% of its funding goal.

A third book and second novel A Bookkeeper's Guide to Practical Sorcery, a children's fantasy, was published in 2016. An audiobook version read by Charles Collingwood was the subject of another successful Kickstarter campaign.

== Awards ==
In the 2015 UK Blog Awards, she won the individual digital and technology category.

In 2016, she was voted the 13th most influential woman in UK IT by Computer Weekly.

== Bibliography ==
- Taken (Scary Shorts Book 1) (2011)
- Working the Cloud: The Ultimate Guide to Making the Internet Work For You and Your Business (2013)
- Elite: Mostly Harmless (2014)
- A Bookkeeper's Guide to Practical Sorcery (2016)
