= Jamie Bartlett (journalist) =

British author and journalist

- Born: 1979 (Age 46–47); London, England
- Education: University of Oxford; London School of Economics
- Occupations: Author; Journalist; Broadcaster
- Employer: Demos

Jamie Bartlett is a British author and journalist, primarily writing for his newsletter 'How to Survive the Internet'. He has previously written for The Spectator and The Daily Telegraph. He was a senior fellow at Demos and served as director of the Centre for the Analysis of Social Media at Demos until 2017.

== Education ==
Bartlett was educated at a state comprehensive school in Chatham, Kent. He won a scholarship to study at the University of Oxford, and went on to do a master's degree at the London School of Economics.

== Career ==
Bartlett has frequently written about online extremism, free speech, and social media trends in Wikipedia, Twitter, and Facebook. In 2013, he covered the rise of Beppe Grillo's Five Star Movement in Italy for Demos, chronicling the new political force's emergence and use of social media. In 2014, Bartlett released his first full-length book, The Dark Net. The book discusses the darknet and dark web in broad terms, describing a range of underground and emergent subcultures, including social media racists, camgirls, self-harm communities, darknet drug markets, crypto-anarchists, and transhumanists.

In 2017, Bartlett published his second book Radicals Chasing Utopia, which covered fringe political movements including transhumanism, psychedelic societies, and anarcho-capitalism. He also presented the two part BBC Two series The Secrets of Silicon Valley. Bartlett's third book, The People vs Tech, was released in 2018. It argued that "our fragile political system is being threatened by the digital revolution." In 2019, he co-wrote and presented the BBC podcast series The Missing Cryptoqueen, which investigated the disappearance of Ruja Ignatova, founder of the fake cryptocurrency OneCoin. The podcast also examines how OneCoin operates, and its human and social cost. A book of the same name was published in 2022.

Another podcast written and presented by Bartlett, Believe in Magic, was released by BBC Studios in 2023. This investigated the controversy around the collapsed Believe in Magic charity.

== Publications ==
- The Dark Net (2014)
- Radicals Chasing Utopia (2017)
- The People Vs Tech (2018)
- The Missing Cryptoqueen (2022)
