= The Dark Net =

2014 non-fiction book

- First edition
- Author: Jamie Bartlett
- Language: English
- Genre: Non-fiction
- Publication date: 2014

The Dark Net: Inside the Digital Underworld is a 2014 nonfiction book by Jamie Bartlett. It is published in the United Kingdom by Heinemann, in the United States by Melville House Publishers, and in Australia by Random House.

Bartlett discusses online communities away from the mainstream, including those on Tor and the dark web. It discusses the darknet and dark web in broad terms, describing a range of underground and emergent subcultures, including social media racists, cam girls, self-harm communities, darknet drug markets, crypto-anarchists, and transhumanists.

== Contents ==
Throughout the book, Bartlett discusses the history of online communities and trolling, as well as the development of cryptocurrencies and internet crime. Included are his interactions with Amir Taaki, various internet trolls, a person who downloads pictures of child abuse, and neo-Nazi activists. Bartlett stated that he found "positive, helpful and constructive" subcultures on the internet as well as "destructive" ones.

== Reception ==
The Dark Net received generally positive critical reviews. Ian Hargreaves, a University of Cardiff professor of digital economy, wrote in a review posted by the London School of Economics and Political Science Review of Books that the author "sets out chiefly to report rather than to judge".

In The Spectator, Michael Bywater wrote that the book is "necessary reading" as many users are unaware of certain communities and aspects of the internet. Andrew McMillen wrote in The Australian that the book "covers a lot of ground ... without becoming bogged down in technical minutiae". PD Smith of The Guardian described it as "[a]n intelligent and revealing introduction to the denizens of the web's underworld."

Wendy M. Grossman of ZDNet UK stated: "Overall, though, the book's great contribution is non-sensationalist reporting about very touchy subjects." Ian Burrell wrote in The Independent that "we see scant evidence of" positive internet communities within the book.
