= PC Pro =

British computer magazine

- Cover of the November 2024 issue
- Editor: Tim Danton
- Categories: Computer magazine
- Frequency: Monthly
- Circulation: 24,232 Jan-Dec 2016
- Founded: 1994
- First issue: November 1994
- Company: Future plc
- Country: United Kingdom
- Based in: London
- Language: British English

Cover of the May 1997 issue, with previous logo and design

PC Pro is one of several computer magazines published monthly in the United Kingdom by Future plc. Its headquarters is in London. PC Pro also licenses individual articles (or even the whole magazine) for republication in various countries around the world - and some articles are translated into local languages. as of 2006, it claimed to be the biggest-selling monthly PC magazine in the UK.

PC Pro is promoted as a magazine for "IT professionals, IT managers and power users." It is a fairly 'rounded' magazine as it contains information on many different aspects of IT (such as cheap hardware, extreme hardware, software, business, home, retailers) rather than just one of these areas like many UK PC magazines. While it is primarily Windows-focused, it does contain some open source and Apple content.

The magazine was launched in November 1994. The website was launched in December 1996. On 3 June 2015 Dennis Publishing relaunched the PC Pro website as Alphr. The magazine continued to operate under the PC Pro brand, with the two publications occasionally sharing content but otherwise serving different audiences with bespoke content.

Each issue used to come with a cover disc – either a CD in the £4.49 version or a DVD in the £5.99 edition. The CD contained complete commercial software products (usually older versions) and commercial software trials. The DVD contained these and also a selection of applications which featured in every issue. These regular applications are usually freeware or open source.

The issue of cover discs has been superseded by downloadable software accessible via a 'bonus software code' printed on the spine of each issue.

The PC Pro team also publish a weekly podcast available on the Magazine website and on the iTunes Store.

In February 2001 they reissued, with new artwork, a free copy of the controversial "Area 51: The Alien Interview" DVD.

Future acquired Dennis Publishing and its computing division including PC Pro in 2021.

== Current contributors ==
- Tim Danton
- Barry Collins
- Darien Graham-Smith
- Mike Jennings
- Sasha Muller
- Nicole Kobie
- Jon Honeyball
- Davey Winder
- Lee Grant
- Steve Cassidy
- David Crookes
- Rois Ni Thuama
- Nik Rawlinson
- Dick Pountain
- Dave Mitchell
- Olivia Whitcroft

== See also ==
- List of computer magazines
