= Tony Ageh =

American executive

Tony Ageh OBE
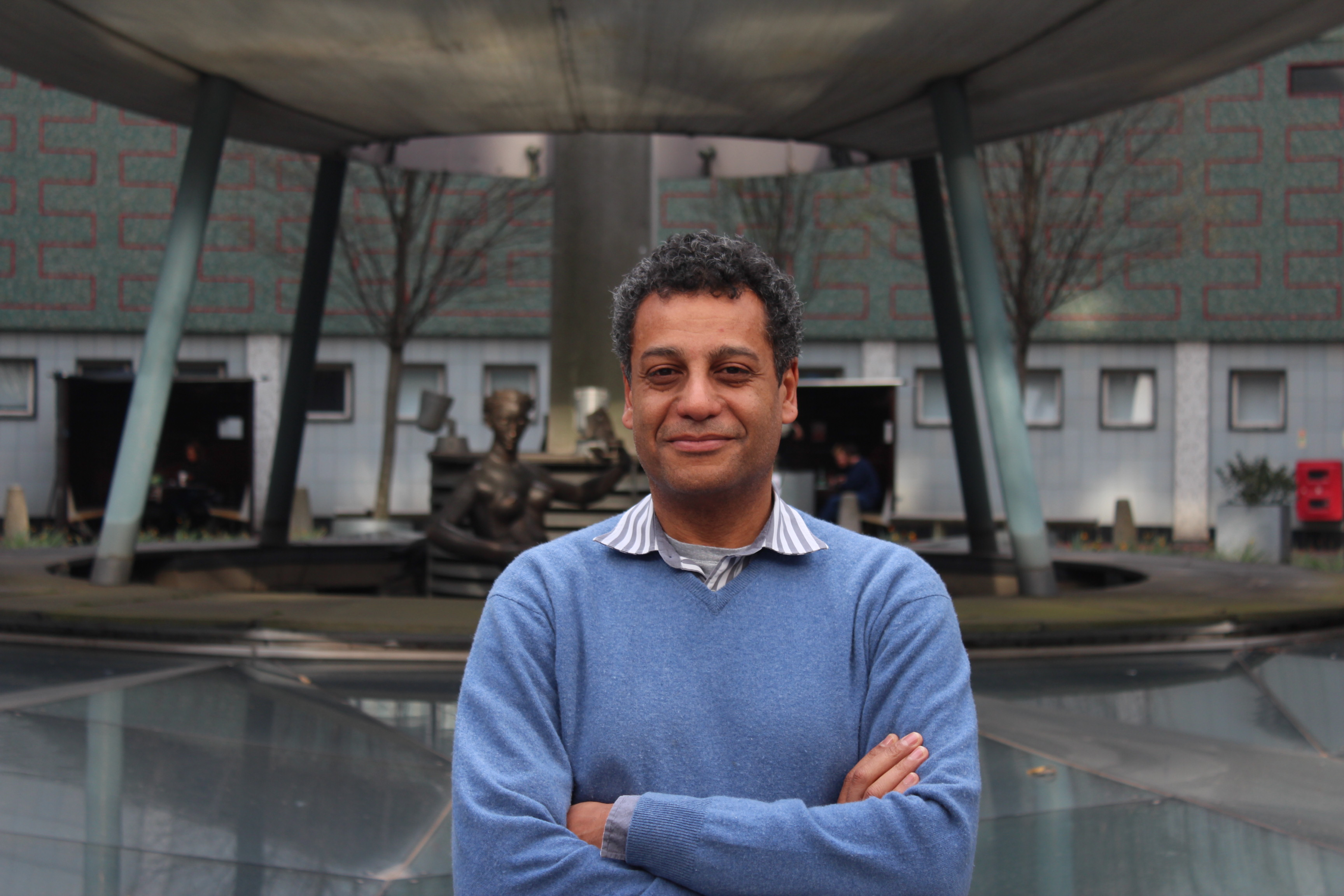
- Ageh in 2012
- Born: 1959 (age 65–66); Chelsea, London
- Occupation: Chief Digital Officer
- Employer: New York Public Library
- Known for: BBC iPlayer – BBC Genome
- Tony Ageh's voice recorded November 2013

Tony Ageh OBE, (born 23 December 1959) was until 2023 the New York Public Library's Chief Digital Officer having previously been Controller of Archive Development at the BBC.

His first job as a school leaver was production assistant on Home Organist, working for Richard Desmond, subsequently the proprietor of Express Newspapers.

He then moved to Publishing Holdings, which owned list titles including What Mortgage and What Telephone. With four colleagues he set up and ran publishing co-operative Brass Tacks, publishers of Mortgage Magazine, during which time he helped football fanzine When Saturday Comes to gain national distribution and upgrade its production to magazine quality. Also during the 1980s he joined Richard Branson's short-lived London listings magazine, Event, set up while Time Out journalists were on strike, then became publisher of City Limits magazine, rival to listings magazine Time Out, which eventually ceased publication in 1993.

He was invited to join the Guardian Media Group in 1990 by Jim Markwick, then managing director. By the mid-1990s he was head of product development at The Guardian where he launched "The Guide", a listings supplement, Wired UK and introduced online content to a UK national newspaper for the first time. From The Guardian he rejoined Branson to work on the launch of virgin.net, originally a portal for the Virgin group of companies, now part of Virgin Media.

He joined the BBC after quitting the UK listings and information service UpMyStreet in 2002. At the BBC he led the team which devised and developed the BBC iPlayer, which necessitated no fewer than 84 internal BBC presentations. In October 2008 he was appointed as the Controller of BBC Archive Development in which he championed the public service use of the BBC's archive through products such as BBC Genome and The research and education space (RES) built in partnership with JISC and the British Universities Film & Video Council, working with former Guardian colleague Bill Thompson.

He was made an Officer of the Order of the British Empire (OBE) in the 2015 New Year Honours.

Media offices
Unknown	Controller, Internet, BBC; 2003–2008	Succeeded by Seetha Kumar as Controller, bbc.co.uk
New title	Controller of Archive Development, BBC; 2008–2016	Succeeded by Post closed
