= Tom Sapsford =

Thomas D. Sapsford (born 1975) is an academic, British ballet dancer, and choreographer, whose work often concentrates on the interplay of contemporary dance and new media technology. He trained at the Royal Ballet School, winning prizes from Kenneth MacMillan. In 1993, Sapsford joined The Royal Ballet, and two years later was awarded one of the first ever Jerwood Foundation Young Choreographers' Awards. His work has been presented by The Royal Ballet and The Royal Opera House, among others.

Sapsford completed a PhD in classics at the University of Southern California in 2017. He also received a B.A. in Classical Studies from the University of Bristol as well as a graduate certificate in Gender Studies. He was a Spring 2019 resident fellow at the Center for Ballet and the Arts at New York University and an early career associate at the Archive of Performances of Greek and Roman Drama at the University of Oxford.

Sapsford is currently a lecturer in classical and medieval studies at Boston College in Chestnut Hill, Massachusetts. Sapsford's academic interests include ancient Greek and Roman performance cultures, contemporary dance and the classical world, and the history of sexuality.
