= Bill Thompson (technology writer) =

English technology writer (born 1960)

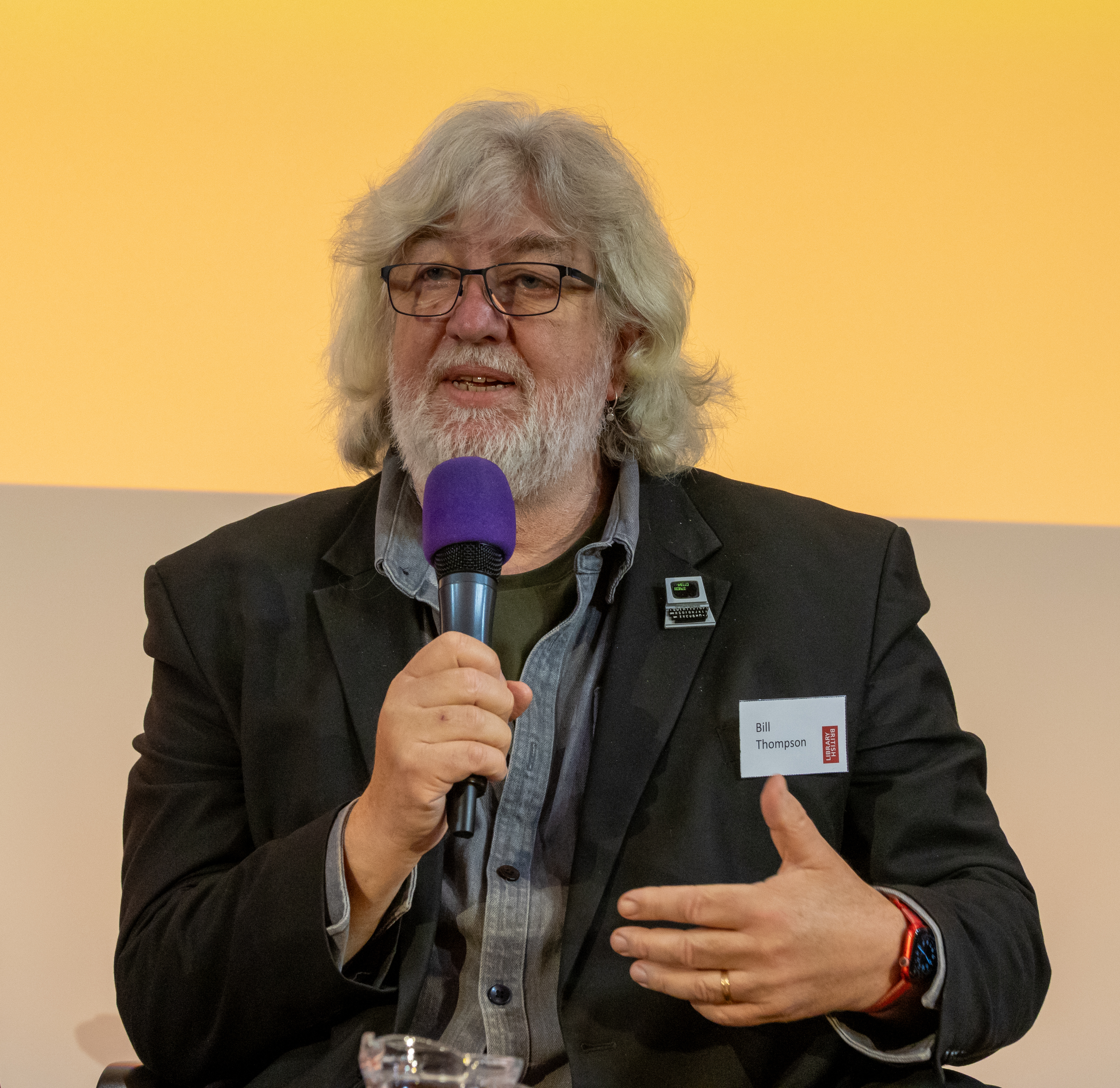
- Bill Thompson in 2025
- Born: William George Thompson; 6 October 1960 (age 65); Jarrow, County Durham, United Kingdom
- Occupation: Technology writer
- Bill Thompson's voice recorded October 2012
- Website: https://thebillblog.com

William George Thompson (born 6 October 1960) is an English technology writer, and technologist, best known for his writing in The Guardian newspaper in the 1990s, his weekly column in the Technology section of BBC News Online, and his appearances over twenty years on Digital Planet, a radio show on the BBC World Service. He is Head of Public Value Research in BBC Research & Development, and the editor of the Working for an MP website.

== Biography ==
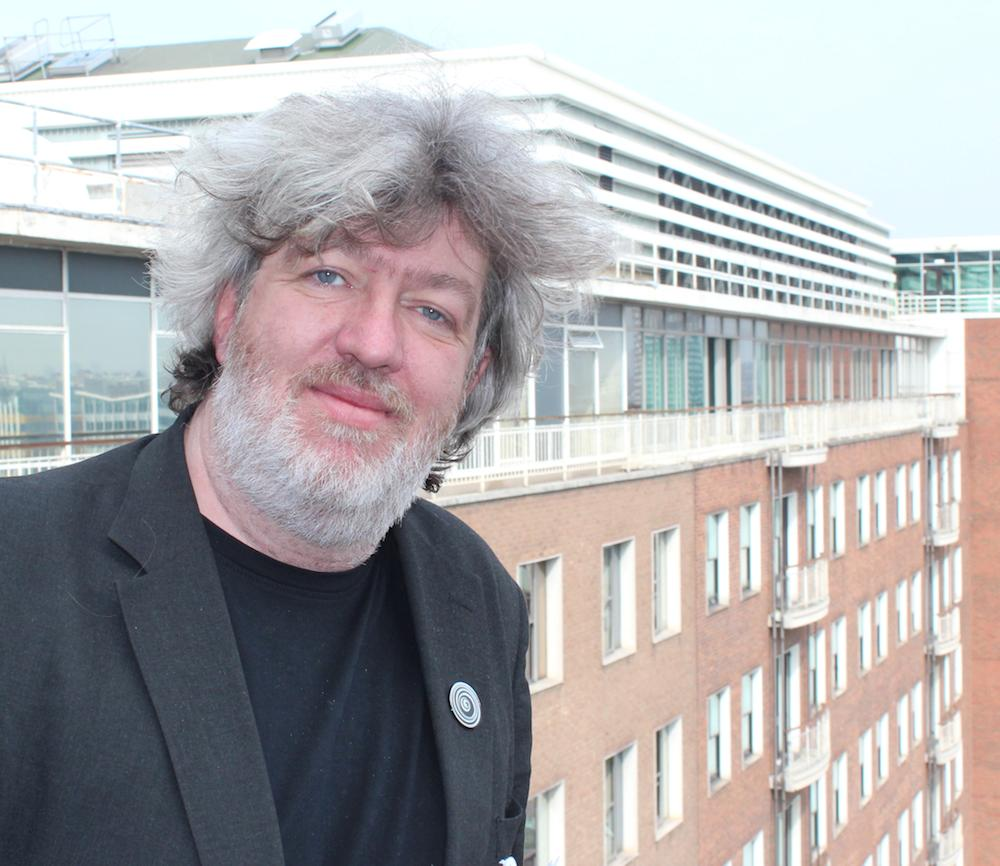
Bill Thompson at the BBC Television Centre, 2012

Born in Jarrow, County Durham, Thompson grew up in Corby, Northamptonshire. He graduated from St Catharine's College, Cambridge in philosophy and with the Diploma in Computer Science in 1984 and worked at Acorn Computers.

He was a correspondent for the technology programme The Big Byte on BBC Radio. He began to write for The Guardian in 1990, and in 1994 went to work there (having previously worked at Pipex, the United Kingdom's first commercial Internet service provider) as head of new media, setting up the paper's website, which he argued should not be paywalled. He left the Guardian in 1996, but continued to be a contributor to both that and newspapers and magazines including The Times, .net, and Internet Magazine.

In November 2009 he took on a role as head of partnership development for Archive Development projects at the BBC, working with Tony Ageh (formerly of The Guardian), the then Controller of Archive Development at the BBC. Since then he has worked as Partnership Lead for the BBC Make It Digital initiative before moving to R&D in 2017.

He acted as contributor and expert on Digital Planet from its launch as Go Digital in August 2001 to its final broadcast in March 2023. After the end of Digital Planet, in April 2023, Mitchell and Thompson returned with a new technology podcast, The Gareth and BillCast. He was an honorary senior visiting fellow at City University London's Journalism Department and wrote for BBC WebWise.

Thompson was a trustee of the Britten Sinfonia, and formerly a board member of the Writers' Centre Norwich. In 2010, he was nominated for the Prudential Arts and Business Board Member of the year award. In October 2016, Anglia Ruskin University awarded Thompson an Honorary Doctor of Arts degree.

He is a member of the main advisory board of the Web Science Institute at the University of Southampton and a trustee of the Web Science Trust.

He has two children.

== Bibliography ==
Thompson has also written books for children:

- Thompson, Bill (1999). Your Own Website. Hodder Headline. ISBN 978-0340736500.
- Thompson, Bill (2000). Your Own Chat Room. Hodder Headline. ISBN 978-0340784822.
- Thompson, Bill (2000). Homework Busters. Belitha Press. ISBN 978-1903174142.
