= R.O.S.E. =

Studio album by Jessie J
- Released: 22–25 May 2018
- Studio: MDDN Studios (Burbank, California)
- Length: 55:23
- Label: Republic
- Producer: Jessie J; DJ Camper; Kuk Harrell; Hitmaka; BongoByTheWay

Jessie J chronology
Sweet Talker (2014)	R.O.S.E. (2018)	This Christmas Day (2018)

Singles from R.O.S.E.
- 1. "Real Deal" Released: 11 August 2017; 2. "Think About That" Released: 15 September 2017; 3. "Not My Ex" Released: 6 October 2017; 4. "Queen" Released: 17 November 2017

R.O.S.E. is the fourth studio album by English singer-songwriter Jessie J. It was released by Republic Records in four parts, starting on 22 May 2018, and finishing on 25 May 2018, with a part being released on each day. The four parts released are R (Realisations), O (Obsessions), S (Sex) and E (Empowerment). Jessie co-wrote the album and worked with producers such as DJ Camper and Kuk Harrell.

The songs "Real Deal", "Think About That", "Not My Ex" and "Queen" were released as singles before the release of the album. Jessie J promoted the album with the R.O.S.E Tour (2017–2018) performing songs from the album and some of her signature hits.

== Background ==
Following the release of Jessie J's previous album, Sweet Talker (2014), she began to have difficulty with writing and creating new music. In an interview with Billboard, she stated "I wasn't enjoying the music I was making as much as I should. I wasn't writing because I didn't want to make music that escaped me from that. I wanted to make music that put me in the feeling. But to do that I had to be really strong; to know that I wasn't going to be able to be pushed and fall over. That's why it took me a long time. I don't feel that I've ever learned so much about myself at any other time in my life." After some time off working with DJ Camper, Jessie J became inspired to write again. "[DJ Camper] put the 'Think About That' beat on repeat before going outside for a break. I called him a dickhead because I still didn't feel creative yet. I hadn't really written a song for two years, just some poetry. But as I sat there and listened to the beat, words started to come out". Jessie J released her first full-length project in four years with the four-part album R.O.S.E. The record was not initially conceived as a traditional album, but rather as a series of extended plays that together form an acrostic of the words "Realisations", "Obsessions", "Sex", and "Empowerment". Each part explores a different theme related to human experience, which Jessie J described as a personal achievement. The project features a range of vocal approaches and is supported by production that has been noted for its soulful and polished style.

When talking about the singles, "Think About That" and "Not My Ex" with Jack White from the Official Charts Company, Jessie described them as "a new energy". While talking about the acronyms of the album's title, Jessie said that "Those four words were what I kept coming back to, that everything I was writing about could fall into. I wrote [R.O.S.E.] out and then thought 'shit, my mum's name is Rose' and it came naturally like that." She also told Billboard Radio China, "I have done so much growing in the last few years. You can hear it in the music, the songs on R.O.S.E. are simply me singing my diary in a melody. I am so grateful and happy that anyone who has been waiting for this record in full will finally have it".

== Promotion ==
In August 2017, Jessie teamed up with M&M's to promote her single "Real Deal". In the following months, she released "Think About That", "Not My Ex" and "Queen" as follow-up singles from R.O.S.E.

=== Tour ===
Jessie J announced the R.O.S.E. Tour in September 2017 in support of the album's four-part rollout. The tour marked her first-ever North American run, which she described as "a dream come true". She revealed the news through an Instagram post featuring the album's black-and-white artwork, writing that performing live has been her passion since childhood and that she feels her best on stage. American singer Ro James was announced as the opening act, with the tour beginning on October 3, 2017, in Vancouver.

== Critical reception ==
Professional ratings
Review scores
Source	Rating
Renowned for Sound	3.5/5 stars

Renowned for Sound awarded R.O.S.E. 3.5 out of 5 stars, with Rachael Scarsbrook stating that "splitting an album into four chunks is a brave move for a popstar, in a genre when fans are a little more casual and expect everything to be delivered to them in one all consuming format. That said, R.O.S.E. feels like Jessie J almost fully rejecting her more mainstream appeal in order to put out a collection of tracks that mean a great deal to her on a more personal level. It might not be the kind of thing I normally go for, but as a project it’s actually quite skilled and enjoyable."

== Track listing ==
All tracks were written by Jessica Cornish and Darhyl Camper, except where noted.

R.O.S.E. (Realisations)
No.	Title	Producer(s)	Length
1.	"Oh Lord"	DJ Camper; Jessie J	1:37
2.	"Think About That"	DJ Camper	3:13
3.	"Dopamine"	DJ Camper; Jessie J	3:17
4.	"Easy on Me"	DJ Camper; Jessie J	4:59
Total length:			13:06

R.O.S.E. (Obsessions)
No.	Title	Producer(s)	Length
5.	"Real Deal" (Cornish, Camper, Shuggie Otis)	DJ Camper; Kuk Harrell	4:15
6.	"Petty"	DJ Camper	3:02
7.	"Not My Ex"	DJ Camper	3:30
8.	"Four Letter Word"	DJ Camper; Jessie J	4:16
Total length:			15:02

R.O.S.E. (Sex)
No.	Title	Producer(s)	Length
9.	"Queen"	DJ Camper	3:24
10.	"One Night Lover"	DJ Camper	4:04
11.	"Dangerous"	DJ Camper	4:00
12.	"Play" (Jerry Fuller, David Foster, Cheryl Lynn, David Paich)	BongoByTheWay; Hitmaka	3:07
Total length:			14:35

R.O.S.E. (Empowerment)
No.	Title	Producer(s)	Length
13.	"Glory"	DJ Camper	3:28
14.	"Rose Challenge"	DJ Camper	0:55
15.	"Someone's Lady"	DJ Camper	4:28
16.	"I Believe in Love"	DJ Camper	3:49
Total length:			12:40

== Personnel ==
Credits were adapted from Tidal.

Performance

- Jessica Cornish – vocals, background vocals, songwriting
- Darhyl Camper – songwriting
- Shuggie Otis – songwriting
- Jerry Fuller – songwriting
- David Foster – songwriting
- Cheryl Lynn – songwriting
- David Paich – songwriting

Technical

- Darhyl Camper – programming, production
- Kuk Harrell – production
- Hitmaka – production
- Bongo ByTheWay – production
- Simone Torres – engineering
- Sauce Miyagi – engineering
- Jaycen Joshua – mixing
- David Nakaji – mixing assistance
- Iván Jiménez – mixing assistance
- Maddox Chimm – mixing assistance

== Release history ==
R.O.S.E. release history
Release	Date	Label
R (Realisations)	22 May 2018	Republic
O (Obsessions)	23 May 2018	Republic
S (Sex)	24 May 2018	Republic
E (Empowerment)	25 May 2018	Republic
R.O.S.E. (Hong Kong CD release)	31 August 2018	Universal Music Group
