= List of Nicki Minaj live performances =

Nicki Minaj live performances
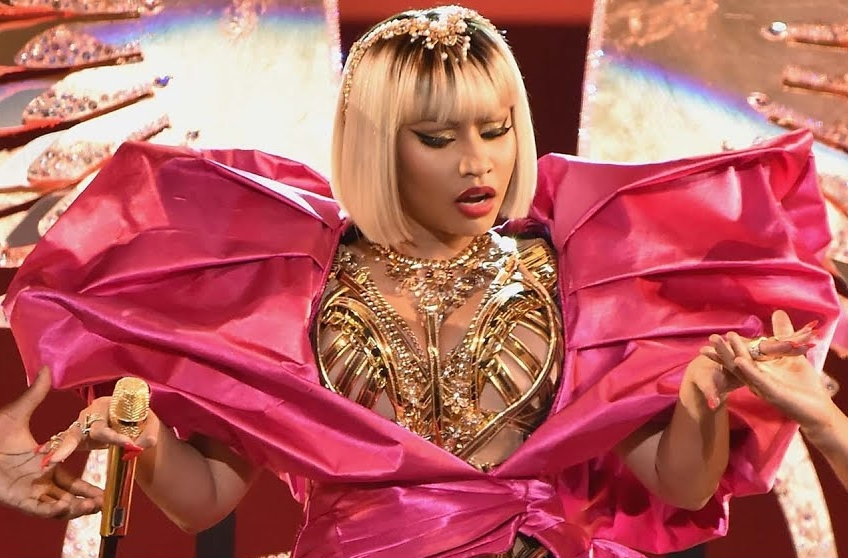
- Minaj performing at the 2018 MTV Video Music Awards
- Concert tours: 4
- Concerts: 8
- Promotional tours: 1
- Televised live performances: 46

Rapper Nicki Minaj has embarked on three concert tours throughout her career. Her 2012 debut Pink Friday Tour, which was worldwide and supported her first and second studio album, Pink Friday: Roman Reloaded, received favorable reviews from music critics. The Pink Friday Tour was extended with the Reloaded Tour. During the Pink Friday: Reloaded Tour, Minaj visited Europe, Oceania, and Asia. Following the release of her 2014 third studio album The Pinkprint, Minaj embarked on her next world concert venture, The Pinkprint Tour, to promote the album.

In 2012, Minaj was a guest on the Super Bowl XLVI halftime show, performing alongside headliner Madonna and M.I.A. their song "Give Me All Your Luvin'". Minaj's European leg of her tour with Juice Wrld titled The Nicki Wrld Tour started in February 2019 in support of her fourth studio album, Queen.

== Concert tours ==
=== Headlining ===
Title	Date	Shows	Gross
Pink Friday Tour	May 16, 2012 – August 14, 2012 (worldwide)	44	—N/a
The Pink Friday Tour was Minaj's debut concert tour. Its set list mainly drew from her second studio album, Pink Friday: Roman Reloaded (2012) and debut studio album, Pink Friday (2010) The tour began in May 2012 with shows in Australia and Asia, then continued on to Europe and North America in June, July, and August 2012. It came to a close on August 14, 2012, in New York City at the Roseland Ballroom. Alexis Petridis of The Guardian, who attended the show Hammersmith Apollo in London, rated the tour with 3 out of 5 stars, saying, "It seems a strange thing to say about a performance that opens with a woman rapping 'I'm a bad bitch, I'm a cunt', but there's something oddly restrained about Nicki Minaj's live show. The final show was a part of a free Pepsi promotional concert. Attendees were only eligible for tickets if they called radio stations Hot 97, Power 105, Z-100, 92.3 Now, and WBLI, or tweeted Minaj or Pepsi on Twitter.
Pink Friday: Reloaded Tour	October 21, 2012 – December 28, 2012 (worldwide)	18	—N/a
Pink Friday: Reloaded Tour, which was an extension of the Pink Friday Tour due to high demand, debuted on October 21, 2012, in Nottingham England, Capital FM Arena in support of her second studio album Pink Friday: Roman Reloaded and its re-release Pink Friday: Roman Reloaded – The Re-Up. The tour grossed approximately $14 million worldwide.
The Pinkprint Tour	March 16, 2015 – March 25, 2016 (worldwide)	55	$22 million
Launched in support of The Pinkprint (2014), this was Minaj's third worldwide tour. It was officially announced a week before the album's release, on December 8. The tour grossed $22 million.
Pink Friday 2 World Tour	March 1, 2024 – October 11, 2024 (worldwide)	80	$81 million
The Pink Friday 2 World Tour, in support of Minaj's fifth studio album Pink Friday 2 (2023). The tour is Minaj's fourth worldwide tour and fifth tour overall. It was officially announced on November 17, 2023 with a rooster with potential locations in different cities, on December 11, 2023, Minaj announced the official tour dates. The tour grossed $67 million from 34 shows.

=== Co-headlining ===
Title	Co-headliner	Date	Shows	Gross
The Nicki Wrld Tour	Juice Wrld	February 21, 2019 – March 28, 2019	19	$10 million
The Nicki Wrld Tour visited cities in Europe starting in February 2019. Minaj was accompanied by the late-American rapper Juice Wrld, replacing Future. The original tour title was the NickiHndrxx Tour, an all-stadium tour headlined by Minaj and Future, in support of Minaj's fourth studio album, Queen, which was announced in August 2018. The NickiHndrxx tour was scheduled to start on September 21, 2018, in Baltimore, Maryland as part of North American leg, but was postponed by Minaj. She eventually only went on the European leg of the tour with Juice Wrld and rescheduled dates have not been announced as of 2020.

=== As featured act ===
Title	Year	Associated album(s)	Set list
America's Most Wanted Tour	2008	Sucka Free	—N/a
I Am Music II Tour	2011	Pink Friday	"Massive Attack"; "Up All Night"; "Roman's Revenge"; "Bottoms Up"; "Did It On'em"; "Moment 4 Life"; "My Chick Bad"; "Letting Go (Dutty Love)"; "Super Bass"; "Right Thru Me"; "Monster"
Femme Fatale Tour	2011	Pink Friday	"Roman's Revenge"; "Did It On'em"; "Bottoms Up"; "Up All Night"; "My Chick Bad"; "Your Love"; "Fly"; "Raining Men"; "Monster"; "Save Me"; "Anywhere Is"; "BedRock"; "Check It Out"; "Letting Go (Dutty Love)"; "Where Them Girls At"; "Reggae Music"; "Book of Days"; "Moment 4 Life"; "Super Bass"

== Promotional tours ==
Title	Year	Associated album(s)	Set list
Pink Friday Promo Tour	2010	Pink Friday	"Right Thru Me"; "Fly"; "Did It On'em"

== Concerts ==
Date	Event	Notes
May 30, 2015	iHeartRadio Music Festival	Two-day concert festival held each year in September since 2011 by iHeart Radio in Las Vegas, Nevada, U.S. Her set list consisted of "Bang Bang" performed with Ariana Grande "Super Bass" and "Feeling Myself".
October 15, 2016	Tidal X: 1015	Hosted by Angie Martinez, Minaj headlined a charity concert at the Barclays Center in New York City, in support of the Robin Hood Foundation. Other performers at the event included Alicia Keys, Lauryn Hill, T.I., DNCE, Robin Thicke, Prince Royce, and Bebe Rexha. The event was streamed live exclusively on Tidal.
September 2, 2018	Made in America Festival	Minaj co-headlined the annual Made in America Festival on September 2, 2018
January 5, 2019	FOMO	It is held each year since 2016 in multiple cities of Australia and New Zealand. Minaj will be present at five dates. Other performers at the event include Rae Sremmurd and Aminé.
July 1, 2022	Essence Festival of Culture	Minaj co-headlined the festival, performing on the second day.
July 10, 2022	Wireless Festival	Minaj headlined the final day of the festival.
September 23, 2022	Rolling Loud New York	Minaj co-headlined the festival, performing on the first day.
March 15, 2024	Rolling Loud California	Minaj co-headlined the festival, performing on the first date. The performance was a part of her 2024 tour in support of Pink Friday 2.

== Televised live performances ==
Date	Event	City	Performed song(s)
February 4, 2010	Late Show with David Letterman	New York City	"Shakin' It 4 Daddy" with Robin Thicke
June 27, 2010	BET Awards 2010	Los Angeles	"Hello, Good Morning", "My Chick Bad", "All I Do Is Win" with DJ Khaled, Diddy-Dirty Money
September 12, 2010	2010 MTV Video Music Awards	Los Angeles	"Your Love" (intro) / "Check It Out"
October 5, 2010	Late Show with David Letterman	New York City	"Check It Out" with Will.i.am
October 10, 2010	Live With Regis and Kelly	New York City	"Check It Out" with Will.i.am
November 17, 2010	The Wendy Williams Show	New York City	"Right Thru Me"
November 18, 2010	Late Show with David Letterman	New York City	"Right Thru Me"
November 22, 2010	106 & Park	New York City	"Right Thru Me", "Roman's Revenge"
November 29, 2010	Live With Regis and Kelly	New York City	"Right Thru Me"
January 10, 2011	The Ellen DeGeneres Show	Burbank, California	"Moment 4 Life"
January 29, 2011	Saturday Night Live	New York City	"Moment 4 Life", "Right Thru Me"
May 22, 2011	2011 Billboard Music Awards	Nevada	"Super Bass", "Till the World Ends" with Britney Spears and Kesha
July 17, 2011	America's Got Talent	New Jersey	"Where Them Girls At" with Flo Rida
August 5, 2011	Good Morning America	New York City	"Till the World Ends", "Where Them Girls At", "Moment 4 Life", "Super Bass"
November 20, 2011	American Music Awards of 2011	Los Angeles	"Turn Me On" with David Guetta, "Super Bass"
February 5, 2012	Super Bowl XLVI halftime show	Indianapolis, Indiana	"Give Me All Your Luvin'" (featuring Madonna and M.I.A.)
February 12, 2012	54th Annual Grammy Awards	Los Angeles	"Roman's Revenge" (intro), "Roman Holiday"
February 26, 2012	2012 NBA All-Star Game	Orlando, Florida	"Moment 4 Life", "Turn Me On", "Super Bass"
July 1, 2012	BET Awards 2012	Los Angeles	"Champion", "Beez in the Trap" (featuring 2 Chainz)
September 6, 2012	2012 MTV Video Music Awards	Los Angeles	"Girl on Fire" with Alicia Keys
November 18, 2012	American Music Awards of 2012	Los Angeles	"Freedom", "Beauty and a Beat" with Justin Bieber
May 19, 2013	2013 Billboard Music Awards	Los Angeles	"High School"
June 30, 2013	BET Awards 2013	Los Angeles	"Love More", "I'm Out"
June 29, 2014	BET Awards 2014	Los Angeles	"Chi-Raq", "Pills N Potions" with Burnell Taylor
August 24, 2014	2014 MTV Video Music Awards	California	"Anaconda", "Bang Bang", "She Came to Give It to You" with Usher
September 9, 2014	Fashion Rocks	New York	"Anaconda"
November 9, 2014	2014 MTV Europe Music Awards	Glasgow, Scotland	"Super Bass", "Bed of Lies", "Anaconda"
November 23, 2014	American Music Awards of 2014	Los Angeles	"Bed of Lies" with Skyler Grey, "Bang Bang" with Ariana Grande and Jessie J
December 6, 2014	Saturday Night Live	New York City	"Bed of Lies" with Skylar Grey, "Only", "All Things Go"
June 28, 2015	BET Awards 2015	Los Angeles	"All Eyes on You" with Meek Mill and Chris Brown
August 30, 2015	2015 MTV Video Music Awards	Los Angeles	"Trini Dem Girls", "The Night Is Still Young", "Bad Blood" with Taylor Swift
October 10, 2015	Saturday Night Live	New York City	"The Hills" with The Weeknd
August 28, 2016	2016 MTV Video Music Awards	New York City	"Side to Side" with Ariana Grande
November 20, 2016	American Music Awards of 2016	Los Angeles	"Side to Side", "Do You Mind" with DJ Khaled, August Alsina, Future and Rick Ross
May 21, 2017	2017 Billboard Music Awards	Las Vegas	"No Frauds" with Lil Wayne, "Light My Body Up" with David Guetta, "Swalla" with Jason Derulo, "Regret in Your Tears"
August 27, 2017	2017 MTV Video Music Awards	California	"Swish Swish" with Katy Perry
September 14, 2017	The Tonight Show Starring Jimmy Fallon	New York City	"Rake It Up" with Yo Gotti
May 19, 2018	Saturday Night Live	New York City	"Chun Li", "Poke It Out" with Playboi Carti
June 24, 2018	BET Awards 2018	Los Angeles	"Chun-Li", "Rich Sex"
August 20, 2018	2018 MTV Video Music Awards	New York City	"Majesty", "Ganja Burn", "Barbie Dreams", "Fefe"
November 4, 2018	2018 MTV Europe Music Awards	Bizkaia Arena, Barakaldo, Basque Country, Spain	"Good Form", "Woman Like Me" with Little Mix, "Goodbye" with Jason Derulo and David Guetta
November 11, 2018	44th People's Choice Awards	Barker Hangar Santa Monica California	"Good Form", "Dip" with Tyga
April 6, 2022	Carpool Karaoke, The Late Late Show with James Corden	Los Angeles	"Anaconda", "Monster", "Someone like You", "Blick Blick", "Super Bass", "Do We Have a Problem?", "Chun-Li", "Starships"
August 28, 2022	2022 MTV Video Music Awards	New Jersey	"All Things Go", "Roman's Revenge", "Monster", "Beez in the Trap", "Chun-Li", "Moment 4 Life", "Super Bass", "Anaconda", "Super Freaky Girl"
September 12, 2023	2023 MTV Video Music Awards	Newark	"Last Time I Saw You", "Big Difference"
December 14, 2023	Power 96.1's Jingle Ball	Atlanta	"FTCU", "Everybody", "Chun-Li", "Beez in the Trap", "Needle", "Red Ruby Da Sleeze", "Super Freaky Girl", "Moment 4 Life", "Your Love", "Barbie Dangerous", "Super Bass"

== Other appearances ==
Date	Event	City	Song(s) performed	Notes
September 12, 2014	On the Run Tour	Paris	"Flawless"	Performed with Beyoncé.
September 13, 2014	On the Run Tour	Paris	"Flawless"	Performed with Beyoncé.
April 14, 2019	Sweetener World Tour / Coachella Valley Music and Arts Festival 2019	Indio	"Side to Side", "Bang Bang"	Minaj joined Ariana Grande for her set.
March 5, 2023	Rolling Loud Festival California	Inglewood	"High School", "Truffle Butter", "Super Freaky Girl"	Minaj joined Lil Wayne for his set.
