= Pink Friday 2 World Tour =

2024 concert tour by Nicki Minaj

The Pink Friday 2 World Tour
- World tour by Nicki Minaj
- Promotional poster for the tour
- Location: Europe; Morocco; North America
- Associated album: Pink Friday 2
- Start date: March 1, 2024
- End date: October 11, 2024
- Legs: 2
- No. of shows: 79
- Supporting acts: Monica; Tyga; Bia; Skillibeng
- Attendance: 788,124
- Box office: $108.8 million ($111.66 million in 2025 dollars)

Nicki Minaj concert chronology
- The Nicki Wrld Tour (2019); Pink Friday 2 World Tour (2024)

The Pink Friday 2 World Tour (also known as the Gag City World Tour) was the fourth solo, and fifth overall, concert tour by rapper Nicki Minaj, in support of her fifth album, Pink Friday 2 (2023). With a gross of over $108.8 million based on the first 70 shows, it concluded as the fourth-highest-grossing tour by a rapper in history, the highest-grossing tour by a female rapper, the first among female rappers to surpass US$100 million in revenue, and, with its first leg, the first tour by a female rapper to sell out every show consecutively. It was nominated for Hip-Hop Tour of the Year at the 2025 Pollstar Awards.

Consisting of 79 shows across three continents, the Pink Friday 2 World Tour was the most extensive tour of Minaj's career. It began on March 1, 2024, in Oakland, California, and concluded on October 11, 2024, in Elmont, New York. It was her first concert tour in over five years, following The Nicki Wrld Tour (2019), and her first tour within North America in over nine years, with her previous being The Pinkprint Tour (2015). Monica was the supporting act for the first North American leg of the tour, while Bia, Tyga, and Skillibeng supported the second leg.

== Background ==
On June 29, 2023, Nicki Minaj announced her fifth studio album Pink Friday 2. The album was originally slated for release on October 20, 2023, but was eventually delayed to November 17. In her announcement, Minaj revealed that a concert tour supporting the album would begin "around the first quarter of 2024". During an Instagram live stream on October 11, she stated that the "approach" and "feel" of the tour would be "very different". She said: "This will be a very different feeling tour, even if you've been to every Nicki Minaj tour that's ever existed". In late October, she announced that the album's release was ultimately delayed to December 8, 2023; and that details of the tour would be revealed on November 17 – the previously iterated release date of the album.

On November 17, 2023, Minaj announced the Pink Friday 2 Tour and released a roster of 40 cities in the United States, Canada, and Europe that the tour would visit in 2024. A webpage on her website and Laylo, a fan engagement online platform, was made available for fans to sign up for the ticket presale. Minaj's website crashed for a short time, minutes after her announcement. She stated that "about [thirty thousand] [users]" were on the virtual queue of the sign-up page. Alec Ellin, CEO of Laylo, revealed via his social media that it "drove the single most site traffic we've ever seen at once" and "hundreds of thousands of fans" signed up within the first hour of the announcement. The rapper revealed that dates, venues, and the ticket sale for the tour would be announced in December.

On December 7, Minaj announced the European tour dates via her Twitter account, beginning in May 2024 in Manchester. Presale for the European dates commenced exclusively to fans who signed up, on December 8, 2023. Tickets went on general public sale on December 15, 2023.

On December 11, 2023, Minaj announced the US and Canada dates. The North American leg includes her headlining slots at the Rolling Loud California and Dreamville festivals in March and April 2024. Citi cardholders were granted presale access on December 12, followed by a Live Nation presale which was held on December 14. On December 14, second dates were added in Boston, Chicago, Amsterdam, and Manchester due to high demand. Public on-sale for the North America leg began on December 15 via Minaj's website and Ticketmaster. A second Paris date was added on December 18; it went on sale the day after. 13 more shows were announced on January 16, 2024.

A Citi presale for the North American dates and a website presale for the European dates were held on January 16 and 17, before the general sale on January 19. In the following weeks, Minaj was announced as a headliner at nine festivals across Europe and North Africa. (Note: The nine festivals in the Europe and North Africa legs of the tour were: The Orange Warsaw Festival in Warsaw, Poland, Afro Nation festival in Portimão, Portugal, Mawazine Festival in Rabat, Fiera Milano Live in Milan, Italy, Rolling Loud Europe in Ebreichsdorf, Austria, Openair Frauenfeld in Frauenfeld, Switzerland, Saga Festival in Bucharest, Romania, Wireless Festival in London, England, and Les Ardentes in Liège, Belgium.) The nine slots were added as dates to the Europe and North African leg. On February 8, 2024, Monica announced on The Jennifer Hudson Show that she would serve as the opening act on the North American leg of the tour. On February 26, a date in Dublin was announced. Tickets for the show went on sale via Minaj's website on March 1, 2024. On May 24, 2024, Minaj announced a second US leg, including 22 additional dates in the country, beginning in September. Fans were provided access to sign up for the ticket presale, which took place on May 30, before the general sale the day after. On May 25, Minaj was arrested in Amsterdam for suspicion of marijuana possession as she was about to board a plane for a concert in Manchester. The Amsterdam arrest and brief detainment resulted in the tour's concert in Manchester's Co-op Live arena being rescheduled to June 3. On May 31, Dutch concert organizer and promoter Mojo announced that the tour's second Amsterdam show—scheduled for June 2—had been canceled "due to the events of [the previous week]".

On July 7, 2024, hours prior to her Saga Festival slot in Bucharest, Minaj announced its cancellation after having "been advised by [her security team] [not to travel to the city] due to safety concerns regarding protests in the area". Her decision to cancel the performance was heavily lampooned on social media, as no protest was scheduled for that day. Instead, a protest of accountants against the government's fiscal policies was to take place the next day, following her departure from the country. Minaj was also criticized for the reason given which suggested Eastern Europe as a dangerous place.

On August 16, Minaj announced rappers Tyga, Bia, and Skillibeng as the supporting acts for the second US leg of the tour, subtitled "Gag City Reloaded". The leg contained an updated setlist and new wardrobe. Minaj also debuted music from the third and final deluxe version of Pink Friday 2, titled The Hiatus, with a planned released date of December 13, 2024, which was originally announced as Gag City Reloaded, during the trek. Ultimately, however, no third deluxe version would be released on this date.

== Critical reception ==
The tour received highly positive reviews from critics, who praised the spectacle of the show and Minaj's overall dominance.

Reviewing the tour's opening night in Oakland, California, Gabe Meline wrote that "Nicki's resurrected herself," praising the rapper's performance after a period of controversy in the lead-up to the tour. The review highlighted the setlist's inclusion of both "smash hits and deep cuts" and Minaj's showcasing of the various sides of her persona, including "inspirational Nicki" and "sex-positive Nicki". Shawn Grant of The Source highlighted that "Minaj mesmerized over 25,000 fans at the Oakland Arena, setting a new record as the venue's second-highest-grossing single night by a hip-hop artist." Melissa Ruggieri of USA Today reviewed her tour stop in Monday's Capital One Arena in Washington D.C., writing "Nicki Minaj delivers spectacle backed up by skill on biggest tour of her career," and stated that "Pink Friday 2 tour offers fans everything: Hits, deep cuts, attitude and lots of pink" and that "Still, Minaj is the Queen of Rap for a reason."

Reggie Mathalone of the Houston Press claimed that the "production value under-promised and over-delivered," with the stage being a spectacle fit for Minaj and her promise of Gag City during the Houston, Texas show on May 9. Mathalone described that where the album truly delivers is "live stage with the incredible performance and production value" and that despite some hiccups, "Pink Friday 2, and all its special guests, are well worth the trouble."

Hip-hop reporter Armon Sadler of Vibe reviewed Minaj's show in her hometown of New York City at Madison Square Garden, sharing "[she] gave her native New York crowd a night to remember", and that for Minaj, "there's no place like home". Sadler went on to claim that "There wasn't a single dry eye in the arena when Minaj belted "Save Me". You could not find a single silent person when she claimed her destiny on "Moment 4 Life", and later concluded that "[Nicki] has an undeniable love for her fans and a knack for putting on a fantastic concert". Evening Standard's Emma Loffhagen reviewed Minaj's London tour stop at The O2 Arena, sharing that when the show started, "[Nicki] was the slick image of confident professionalism". Loffhagen also stated that, "At times, the energy in the almost two-and-half hour show did sag slightly – some of the deeper and slower cuts felt a little lackluster in their delivery", and included the fact that "a whopping eight costume (and wig) changes to accommodate Minaj's famous alter egos interrupted the flow a little". However, Loffhagen concluded that when it comes to Minaj, "the Pink Friday 2 tour has proved she needn't worry about her crown shifting. No doubt the London Barbz were left sufficiently gagged". Dallas Observer's Vanessa Quilantan reviewed the Dallas, Texas show during the second leg of the tour, stating that throughout the show "the mood was high, the excitement was palpable and the vibe was convivial." Quilantan concluded that despite the late start "[Nicki] proved without a doubt last night at [American Airlines Center] that pop culture absolutely needs entertainers like her."

== Set list ==
This set list is representative of the show in Oakland, on March 1, 2024. It is not representative of all concerts for the duration of the tour.

1. "I'm the Best"
2. "Barbie Dangerous"
3. "FTCU"
4. "Beep Beep"
5. "Hard White"
6. "Press Play"
7. "Win Again"
8. "We Go Up"
9. "Big Difference" (contains elements of "Beez in the Trap")
10. "Pink Birthday"
11. "Feeling Myself"
12. "Favorite"
13. "Cowgirl"
14. "RNB"
15. "High School"
16. "Needle" (contains elements of "Hold You")
17. "Ganja Burn" (Interlude)
18. "Chun-Li" (contains elements of "Bahm Bahm" and "Darling Nikki")
19. "Red Ruby da Sleeze" (contains elements of "Freaks")
20. "Forward From Trini" / "Black Barbies" (Dancers Interlude)
21. "Barbie World"
22. "Roman's Revenge"
23. "Monster"
24. "Are You Gone Already" (Interlude)
25. "Fallin 4 U"
26. "Right Thru Me"
27. "Save Me"
28. "Here I Am"
29. "Let Me Calm Down"
30. "Nicki Hendrix"
31. "Super Freaky Girl"
32. "Anaconda"
33. "Pink Friday Girls"
34. "Super Bass"
35. "The Night Is Still Young"
36. "Moment 4 Life"
37. "Starships"
38. "Everybody"

=== Notes ===
- During the shows in Paradise, Seattle, Cleveland, and Phoenix, Tyga was a guest performer.
- During the show in Newark, Fivio Foreign joined Minaj on-stage to perform "We Go Up".
- During the shows in New York City, Washington D.C. and Houston, 50 Cent joined Minaj on-stage to perform "Beep Beep".
- During both shows in Boston, Bia joined Minaj on-stage to perform "Whole Lotta Money".
- During the second show in Boston, JT, Bia, Katie Got Bandz, Akbar V, and Maliibu Miitch joined Minaj on-stage to perform "Super Freaky Girl".
- During the show in Detroit, Big Sean joined Minaj on-stage to perform "Dance (A$$)". Sada Baby joined Minaj on-stage to perform "Whole Lotta Choppas".
- During both shows in Chicago, G Herbo joined Minaj on-stage to perform "Chi-raq". Jeremih joined Minaj on-stage to perform "Favorite" and "Want Some More". Jeremih performed "Birthday Sex".
- During the second show in Toronto, Drake joined Minaj on-stage to perform "Needle". Drake performed "Rich Baby Daddy".
- During the second show in Brooklyn, Cyndi Lauper joined Minaj on-stage to perform "Pink Friday Girls". Kai Cenat joined Minaj on-stage during "Everybody".
- During the show in Houston, 50 Cent, Kirko Bangz, T-Wayne and Clubgozilla were guest performers.
- During the show in London, Giggs, Stylo G and Beenie Man were guest performers.
- During the first show in Manchester, Afro B and Central Cee were guest performers.
- During the show in Stockholm, 1.Cuz was a guest performer.
- During the show in Elmont, the final date of the tour, 50 Cent, Sexyy Red, Skillibeng, Skeng, and Young M.A were guest performers; Red performed "Bow Bow Bow (F My Baby Dad)" and her collaboration with Minaj, "Pound Town 2".

== Tour dates ==
List of 2024 shows
Date (2024)	City	Country	Venue	Opening acts	Attendance	Revenue
March 1	Oakland	United States	Oakland Arena	Monica	13,907 / 13,907	$2,340,673
March 3	Denver	United States	Ball Arena	Monica	12,731 / 12,731	$1,971,813
March 8	Paradise (Note: Labeled as Las Vegas in promotional material.)	United States	T-Mobile Arena	Monica	14,644 / 14,644	$2,078,871
March 10	Seattle	United States	Climate Pledge Arena	Monica	14,344 / 14,344	$2,078,906
March 13	Phoenix	United States	Footprint Center	Monica	12,354 / 12,354	$1,890,824
March 15 (Note: This concert is part of Rolling Loud California.)	Inglewood	United States	Hollywood Park	—N/a		
March 20	Atlanta	United States	State Farm Arena	Monica	22,117 / 22,117	$3,586,119
March 21	Atlanta	United States	State Farm Arena	Monica	22,117 / 22,117	$3,586,119
March 22	Orlando	United States	Kia Center	Monica	12,689 / 12,689	$2,139,338
March 24	Nashville	United States	Bridgestone Arena	Monica	10,295 / 10,295	$1,255,627
March 26	Charlotte	United States	Spectrum Center	Monica	14,704 / 14,704	$2,278,267
March 28	Newark	United States	Prudential Center	Monica	12,960 / 12,960	$2,153,537
March 29	Philadelphia	United States	Wells Fargo Center	Monica	14,173 / 14,173	$2,337,474
March 30	New York City	United States	Madison Square Garden	Monica	13,702 / 13,702	$2,857,908
April 1	Washington, D.C.	United States	Capital One Arena	Monica	14,418 / 14,418	$2,396,682
April 2	Baltimore	United States	CFG Bank Arena	Monica	11,660 / 11,660	$1,681,718
April 4	Brooklyn	United States	Barclays Center	Monica	13,977 / 13,977	$2,219,596
April 5	Hartford	United States	XL Center	Monica	11,527 / 11,527	$1,630,643
April 7 (Note: This concert is part of Dreamville Festival.)	Raleigh	United States	Dorothea Dix Park	—N/a		
April 8	Boston	United States	TD Garden	Monica	25,463 / 25,463	$3,802,582
April 10	Boston	United States	TD Garden	Monica	25,463 / 25,463	$3,802,582
April 12	Columbus	United States	Value City Arena	Monica	13,103 / 13,103	$2,108,931
April 13	Milwaukee	United States	Fiserv Forum	Monica	11,761 / 11,761	$1,700,144
April 17	Montreal	Canada	Bell Centre	Monica	14,145 / 14,145	$1,710,239
April 18	Toronto	Canada	Scotiabank Arena	Monica	13,671 / 13,671	$1,893,557
April 20	Detroit	United States	Little Caesars Arena	Monica	13,534 /13,534	$2,259,691
April 24	Chicago	United States	United Center	Monica	27,857 / 27,857	$4,250,318
April 25	Chicago	United States	United Center	Monica	27,857 / 27,857	$4,250,318
April 27	Minneapolis	United States	Target Center	Monica	13,392 / 13,392	$1,870,634
April 30	Toronto	Canada	Scotiabank Arena	Monica	14,088 / 14,088	$1,703,497
May 1	Brooklyn	United States	Barclays Center	Monica	14,120 / 14,120	$2,066,232
May 8 (Note: Rescheduled from March 18, 2024.)	New Orleans	United States	Smoothie King Center	Monica	12,342 / 12,342	$1,474,519
May 9	Houston	United States	Toyota Center	Monica	11,666 / 11,666	$2,025,277
May 10 (Note: Rescheduled from May 11, 2024.)	Dallas	United States	American Airlines Center	Monica	12,764 / 12,764	$2,119,572
May 12	Austin	United States	Moody Center	Monica	11,495 / 11,495	$1,859,375
May 13	Oklahoma City	United States	Paycom Center	Monica	9,656 / 9,656	$1,298,320
May 23	Amsterdam	Netherlands	Ziggo Dome	—N/a	11,608 / 11,608	$1,346,907
May 26	Birmingham	England	Resorts World Arena	—N/a	10,859 / 10,859	$1,428,110
May 28	London	England	The O_{2} Arena	—N/a	15,590 / 15,590	$2,306,260
May 29	Glasgow	Scotland	OVO Hydro	—N/a	9,940 / 10,262	$1,166,038
May 30	Manchester	England	Co-op Live	—N/a	11,290 / 11,290	$1,358,602
June 1	Paris	France	Accor Arena	—N/a	13,748 / 13,748	$1,429,138
June 3 (Note: Rescheduled from May 25, 2024, following Minaj's arrest for alleged drug possession.)	Manchester	England	Co-op Live	—N/a	8,981/11,290	$1,062,714
June 5	Cologne	Germany	Lanxess Arena	—N/a	14,522 / 14,522	$1,447,333
June 7	Berlin	Germany	Uber Arena	—N/a	11,587 / 11,635	$1,365,966
June 8 (Note: This concert is a part of the Orange Warsaw Festival.)	Warsaw	Poland	Sluzewiec Horse Racing Track	—N/a	—N/a	
June 9	Paris	France	Accor Arena	—N/a	13,585 / 13,585	$1,429,135
June 11	Copenhagen	Denmark	Royal Arena	—N/a	6,693 / 9,127	$701,383
June 12	Stockholm	Sweden	Tele2 Arena	—N/a	7,951 / 9,420	$738,452
June 27 (Note: This concert is a part of the Afro Nation festival.)	Portimão	Portugal	Praia da Rocha	—N/a	—N/a	
June 28 (Note: This concert is a part of the Mawazine festival.)	Rabat	Morocco	OLM Souissi	—N/a	—N/a	
July 3	Milan	Italy	Fiera Milano Rho	—N/a	7,642 / 12,537	$700,274
July 5 (Note: This concert is a part of Rolling Loud Europe.)	Ebreichsdorf	Austria	Magna Racino	—N/a	—N/a	
July 6	Dublin	Ireland	Malahide Castle	—N/a	16,879 / 21,100	$1,706,544
July 12 (Note: This concert is a part of the Wireless Festival.)	London	England	Finsbury Park	—N/a	—N/a	
July 13 (Note: This concert is a part of the Openair Frauenfeld.)	Frauenfeld	Switzerland	Grosse Allmend	—N/a	—N/a	
July 14 (Note: This concert is a part of the Les Ardentes.)	Liège	Belgium	Astrid Park	—N/a	—N/a	
September 4	Philadelphia	United States	Wells Fargo Center	Bia; Skillibeng	10,376 / 10,376	$1,126,526
September 6	Pittsburgh	United States	PPG Paints Arena	Bia; Skillibeng	8,588 / 11,030	$873,548
September 7	New York City	United States	Madison Square Garden	Bia; Skillibeng	10,512 / 11,866	$1,587,182
September 9	Washington, D.C.	United States	Capital One Arena	Tyga; Bia; Skillibeng	9,848 / 9,848	$1,188,358
September 12	Buffalo	United States	KeyBank Center	Tyga; Bia; Skillibeng	7,414 / 7,414	$867,922
September 13	Cleveland	United States	Rocket Mortgage FieldHouse	Tyga; Bia; Skillibeng	8,480 / 9,506	$1,108,597
September 15	Birmingham	United States	Legacy Arena	Tyga; Bia; Skillibeng	6,748 / 8,000	$803,407
September 17	Dallas	United States	American Airlines Center	Tyga; Bia; Skillibeng	6,156 / 6,902	$850,128
September 18	San Antonio	United States	Frost Bank Center	Tyga; Bia; Skillibeng	7,007 / 8,427	$923,003
September 21	Los Angeles	United States	Crypto.com Arena	Tyga; Bia; Skillibeng	9,784 / 11,537	$1,476,648
September 22	Inglewood (Note: Labeled as Los Angeles in promotional material.)	United States	Kia Forum	Tyga; Bia; Skillibeng	7,700 / 8,250	$1,093,642
September 23	San Francisco	United States	Chase Center	Tyga; Bia; Skillibeng	7,648 / 9,516	$984,757
September 26	San Diego	United States	Viejas Arena	Tyga; Bia; Skillibeng	6,038 / 7,434	$770,140
September 28	Paradise (Note: Labeled as Las Vegas in promotional material.)	United States	MGM Grand Garden Arena	Tyga; Bia; Skillibeng	5,891 / 7,776	$886,430
October 1	Kansas City	United States	T-Mobile Center	Tyga; Bia; Skillibeng	7,799 / 9,572	$823,364
October 2	St. Louis	United States	Enterprise Center	Tyga; Bia; Skillibeng	8,103 / 10,742	$895,972
October 4	Jacksonville	United States	VyStar Veterans Memorial Arena	Tyga; Bia; Skillibeng	8,613 / 10,155	$969,819
October 5	Tampa	United States	Amalie Arena	Tyga; Bia; Skillibeng	10,123 / 10,123	$1,251,715
October 6	Miami	United States	Kaseya Center	Tyga; Bia; Skillibeng	11,253 / 11,253	$1,482,409
October 8	Raleigh	United States	Lenovo Center	Tyga; Bia; Skillibeng	8,026 / 11,105	$909,679
October 9	Columbia	United States	Colonial Life Arena	Tyga; Bia; Skillibeng	8,064/ 8,569	$836,962
October 11	Elmont (Note: Labeled as Queens in promotional material.)	United States	UBS Arena	Tyga; Bia; Skillibeng	13,505 / 13,505	$1,927,771
Total					788,124 / 828,738 (95.10%)	$108,864,722

Cancelled dates

List of cancelled concerts showing date, city, country, venue and reason
Date (2024)	City	Country	Venue	Reason
June 2	Amsterdam	Netherlands	Ziggo Dome	Detained in Amsterdam
June 4	Cologne	Germany	Lanxess Arena	Scheduling problems
July 7 (Note: This concert was set to be a part of Saga Festival.)	Bucharest	Romania	Romaero Baneasa	Protest in Bucharest
