= Queen Radio: Volume 1 =

Greatest hits album by Nicki Minaj
- Released: August 26, 2022
- Genre: Hip-hop
- Length: 107:28
- Labels: Young Money; Cash Money; Republic

Nicki Minaj chronology
Queen (2018)	Queen Radio: Volume 1 (2022)	Pink Friday 2 (2023)

Queen Radio: Volume 1 is the first greatest hits album by rapper Nicki Minaj. It was released on August 26, 2022 by Young Money Entertainment, Cash Money Records, and Republic Records.

The album includes songs from all five of her studio albums, the mixtape Beam Me Up Scotty (2009), and the Young Money Entertainment compilation Rise of an Empire (2014).

== Critical reception ==
Andy Kellman of AllMusic called it a "generous anthology", while rating it 4.5 stars out of 5. Paper Mag's Kenna McCafferty thought that "the 28 tracks were perfectly selected", as the collection is "jam-packed with [some of] Minaj’s biggest bangers".

== Commercial performance ==
Queen Radio: Volume 1 debuted at number 10 on the US Billboard 200 chart, earning 32,000 album-equivalent units (including 3,000 copies in pure album sales) in its first week, making Nicki Minaj the female rapper with the most solo top 10 albums in Billboard 200 history with six.

== Track listing ==
Queen Radio: Volume 1 track listing
No.	Title	Writer(s)	Producer(s)	Length
1.	"Super Freaky Girl" (from Pink Friday 2, 2023)	Onika Maraj; Lukasz Gottwald; Malibu Babie; Aaron Joseph; Vaughn Oliver; Gamal Lewis; Rick James; Alonzo Miller	Dr. Luke; Malibu Babie; Joseph; Oliver	2:50
2.	"Super Freaky Girl" (Queen mix) (featuring JT, Bia, Katie Got Bandz, Akbar V, and Maliibu Miitch; 2022) (bonus track)	Maraj; Gottwald; Malibu Babie; Joseph; Oliver; Lewis; James; Miller; Jatavia Johnson; Bianca Landrau; Kiara Johnson; Atlanta Raven; Jennifer Roberts	Dr. Luke; Malibu Babie; Joseph; Oliver	3:54
3.	"Likkle Miss" (Remix) (with Skeng; 2022) (bonus track)	Maraj; Kevon Douglas; Emelio Lynch; Rowan Melhado; Sebastian Loers	DiTruth Records; Droptop Records	2:18
4.	"Likkle Miss" (The Fine Nine Remix) (with Skeng featuring Spice, Destra Garcia, Patrice Roberts, Lady Leshurr, Pamputtae, Dovey Magnum, Lisa Mercedez and London Hill; 2022) (bonus track)	Maraj; Kevon Douglas; Emelio Lynch; Rowan Melhado; Sebastian Loers; Grace Hamilton; Melesha O'Garro; Destra Garcia; Patrice Roberts; Pamputtae; Dovey Magnum; Lisa Mercedez; London Hill	DiTruth Records; Droptop Records	6:11
5.	"Roman's Revenge" (featuring Eminem; from Pink Friday, 2010)	Maraj; Marshall Mathers III; Kasseem Dean	Swizz Beatz	4:36
6.	"Did It On'em" (from Pink Friday, 2010)	Maraj; Safaree Samuels; Justin Ellington; Shondrae Crawford	Bangladesh	3:32
7.	"Beez in the Trap" (featuring 2 Chainz; from Pink Friday: Roman Reloaded, 2012)	Maraj; Tauheed Epps; Maurice Jordan	Kenoe	4:28
8.	"Chun-Li" (from Queen, 2018)	Maraj; Jeremy Reid	Nicki Minaj; Reid	3:11
9.	"Do We Have a Problem?" (with Lil Baby; 2022)	Maraj; Dominique Jones; Joshua Goods; Anthony Woart, Jr.	Papi Yerr	3:27
10.	"We Go Up" (featuring Fivio Foreign; 2022)	Maraj; Maxie Ryles III; Goods; Woart; Konrad Zasada; Szymon Świątczak'	Papi Yerr; Swizzy; Szamz	4:15
11.	"High School" (featuring Lil Wayne; from Pink Friday: Roman Reloaded – The Re-Up, 2012)	Maraj; Dwayne Carter, Jr.; Matthew Samuels; Tyler Williams	Boi-1da; T-Minus	3:38
12.	"Moment 4 Life" (featuring Drake; from Pink Friday, 2010)	Maraj; Aubrey Graham; Nikhil Seetharam; Williams	T-Minus	4:39
13.	"Truffle Butter" (featuring Drake and Lil Wayne; from The Pinkprint, 2014)	Maraj; Graham; Carter; Paul Jefferies; Maya Jane Coles	Nineteen85; Coles	3:40
14.	"Itty Bitty Piggy" (from Beam Me Up Scotty, 2009)	Maraj; DeAndre Way	Soulja Boy	4:06
15.	"Barbie Dreams" (from Queen, 2018)	Maraj; Christopher Wallace; James Brown; Fred Wesley; Rashad Smith; Melvin Hough II; Rivelino Wouter	Ringo; Mel and Mus	4:39
16.	"Anaconda" (from The Pinkprint, 2014)	Maraj; Anthony Ray; Jamal Jones; Ernest Clark; Marcos Palacios; Jonathan Solone-Myvett	Polow da Don; Da Internz; AnonXmous	4:20
17.	"Super Bass" (from Pink Friday (Deluxe), 2011)	Maraj; Daniel Johnson; Esther Dean	Kane Beatz	3:20
18.	"Starships" (from Pink Friday: Roman Reloaded, 2012)	Maraj; Nadir Khayat; Rami Yacoub; Carl Falk; Wayne Hector; Bilal Hajji	RedOne; Yacoub; Falk	3:30
19.	"Pound the Alarm" (from Pink Friday: Roman Reloaded, 2012)	Maraj; Khayat; Yacoub; Falk; Achraf Jannusi	RedOne; Yacoub; Falk	3:25
20.	"Your Love" (from Pink Friday, 2010)	Maraj; Andrew Wansel; Joseph Hughes; David Freeman	Pop & Oak	4:05
21.	"Right Thru Me" (from Pink Friday, 2010)	Maraj; Joseph Satriani; Stephen Hacker; Andrew Thielk	Drew Money	3:55
22.	"Bed" (featuring Ariana Grande; from Queen, 2018)	Maraj; Lewis; Dwayne Chin-Quee; Benjamin Diehl; Brett Bailey; Mescon David Asher	Supa Dups; Ben Billions; Beats Bailey; Messy^{[a]}	3:09
23.	"Favorite" (featuring Jeremih; from The Pinkprint, 2014)	Maraj; Jeremy Felton; Leland Wayne; Xavier Dotson; Christian Ward	Metro Boomin; Zaytoven; Hitmaka	4:02
24.	"Save Me" (from Pink Friday, 2010)	Maraj; Wansel; Warren Felder	Pop & Oak	3:05
25.	"Fly" (featuring Rihanna; from Pink Friday, 2010)	Maraj; Jonathan Rotem; Clemm Rishad; Kevin Hissink; William Jordan	J. R. Rotem; Skrt; Hissink	3:32
26.	"Seeing Green" (with Drake and Lil Wayne; from the reissue of Beam Me Up Scotty, 2021)	Maraj; Graham; Carter; Kimberly Jones; Andrew Ramsey; Shannon Sanders; Carlos Broady; Nashiem Myrick; Kaushik Barua; Nile Goveia	Kid Masterpiece; Govi	5:39
27.	"Hard White" (from Queen, 2018)	Maraj; Samuels; Ramon Ibanga, Jr.; Brittany Hazzard	Boi-1da; Illmind	3:13
28.	"Bussin" (with Lil Baby; 2022)	Maraj; D. Jones; Goods; Cyrick Palmer; Rahsul Greer; Terrell Greenlee	Swaggyono; DJ Tizz	2:16
29.	"Lookin Ass" (Young Money featuring Nicki Minaj; from Young Money: Rise of an Empire, 2014)	Maraj; Maurice Brown; Noel Fisher; Kemion Cooks	Detail; Choppa Boi	2:40
30.	"Catch Me" (from Pink Friday, 2010)	Maraj; Dean	Swizz Beatz	3:57
31.	"Girls Fall Like Dominoes" (from Pink Friday, 2010)	Maraj; Rotem; Robbie Furze; Millo Cordell; Cleveland Browne; Greville Gordon; Wycliffe Johnson	J. R. Rotem	3:45
Total length:				107:28

Notes

- ^{^[a]} signifies a co-producer
- Physical copies and the original digital release omit tracks 2–4.

== Charts ==
=== Weekly charts ===
Weekly chart performance for Queen Radio: Volume 1
Chart (2022–2023)	Peak position
Australian Albums (ARIA)	50
Canadian Albums (Billboard)	8
Irish Albums (IRMA)	88
New Zealand Albums (RMNZ)	12
UK Albums (Official Charts)	67
UK R&B Albums (Official Charts)	30
US Billboard 200	10
US Top R&B/Hip-Hop Albums (Billboard)	6

=== Year-end charts ===
2023 year-end chart performance for Queen Radio: Volume 1
Chart (2023)	Position
Australian Albums (ARIA)	91
Canadian Albums (Billboard)	48
New Zealand Albums (RMNZ)	50
UK Albums (OCC)	87
US Billboard 200	93
US Top R&B/Hip-Hop Albums (Billboard)	52

2024 year-end chart performance for Queen Radio: Volume 1
Chart (2024)	Position
Australian Hip Hop/R&B Albums (ARIA)	34
New Zealand Albums (RMNZ)	45
US Top R&B/Hip-Hop Albums (Billboard)	88

== Certifications ==
Certifications for Queen Radio: Volume 1
Region	Certification	Certified units/sales
New Zealand (RMNZ)	2× Platinum	30,000^{‡}
United Kingdom (BPI)	Platinum	300,000^{‡}
^{‡} Sales+streaming figures based on certification alone.
