= Big Foot (Nicki Minaj song) =

2024 single by Nicki Minaj

Single by Nicki Minaj
- Released: January 29, 2024
- Recorded: January 26–28, 2024
- Genre: Hip hop
- Length: 4:22
- Label: Republic
- Songwriters: Onika Maraj; Joshua Goods; Denzel Butler
- Producers: Tate Kobang; ZellTooTrill

Nicki Minaj singles chronology
"FTCU" (2024)	"Big Foot" (2024)	"AGATS2 (Insecure)" (2024)

Audio video
- "Big Foot" on YouTube

"Big Foot" is a song by rapper Nicki Minaj, released on January 29, 2024. The song is a diss track released in response to a lyric from rapper Megan Thee Stallion's single "Hiss", released three days prior. As Minaj was not able to get the original beat she had from producer Lil Juju, the released song features a different beat than she initially previewed. Produced by Tate Kobang and ZellTooTrill, the track debuted at number 23 on the Billboard Hot 100. It received a negative response from critics.

== Background and release ==
After their 2019 collaboration "Hot Girl Summer", Nicki Minaj and Megan Thee Stallion's relationship soured. Minaj said that Megan tried to persuade her to consume alcohol while she was trying to conceive a child and told her she can abort if she got pregnant. Megan has since denied such claims.

On January 26, 2024, Megan released the single "Hiss" in which she rapped the line, "These hoes don't be mad at Megan/These hoes mad at Megan's Law", a reference to the legal requirement that sex offenders appear on a public registry. The line was believed to be aimed at Minaj for her husband being registered as a sex offender. Minutes after the release of "Hiss", Minaj took to Instagram Live to preview her response track, titled "Big Foot". Minaj said on January 28 that the track had been ready for two days and she waited for producer Lil Juju "to clear that beat that I've had for 6 years", adding that, without hearing her song, Megan and her team tried to prevent the producer, who had a close relationship with Megan, from approving the beat. On choosing to respond to Megan's song, Minaj tweeted, "Wasn't gon say anything. But remember how everyone kept my name in their mouth and how I said the next person mention my family gon regret it". Minaj said that the song was not a "diss track" but a "response track".

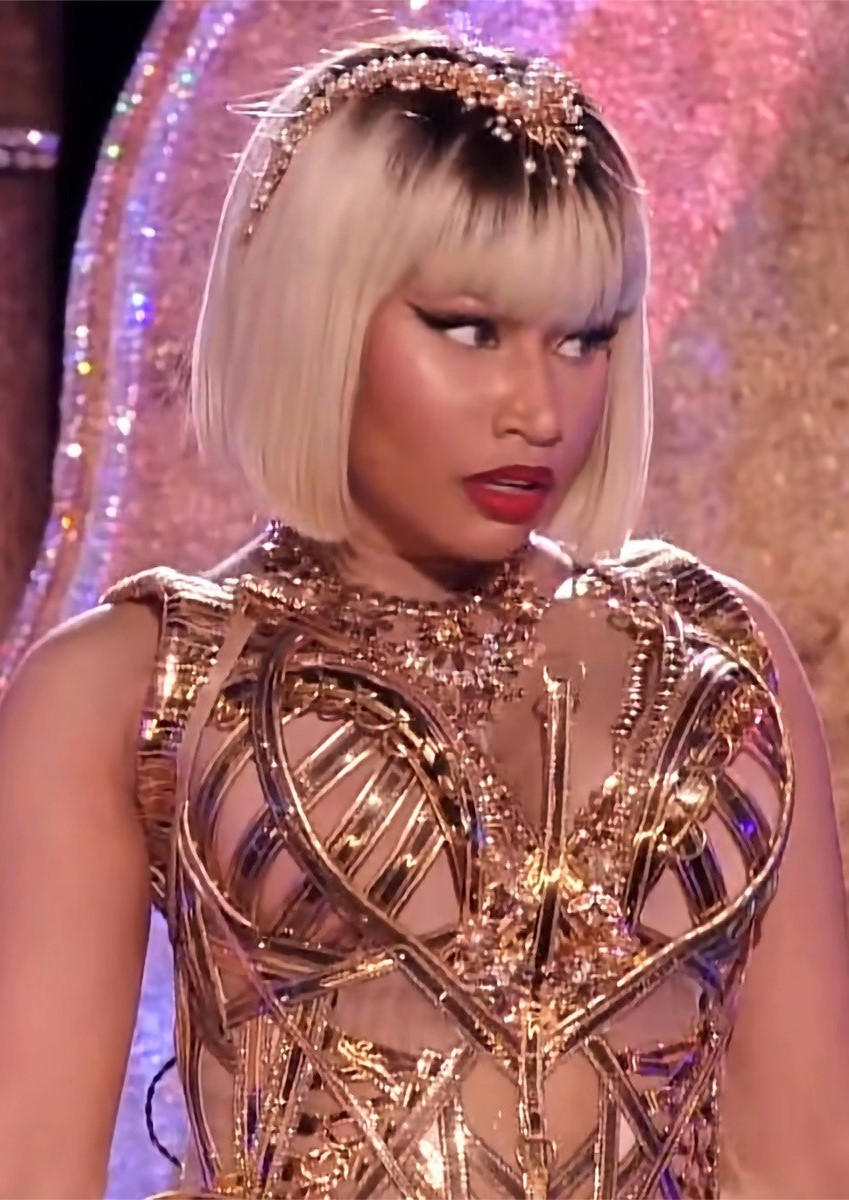
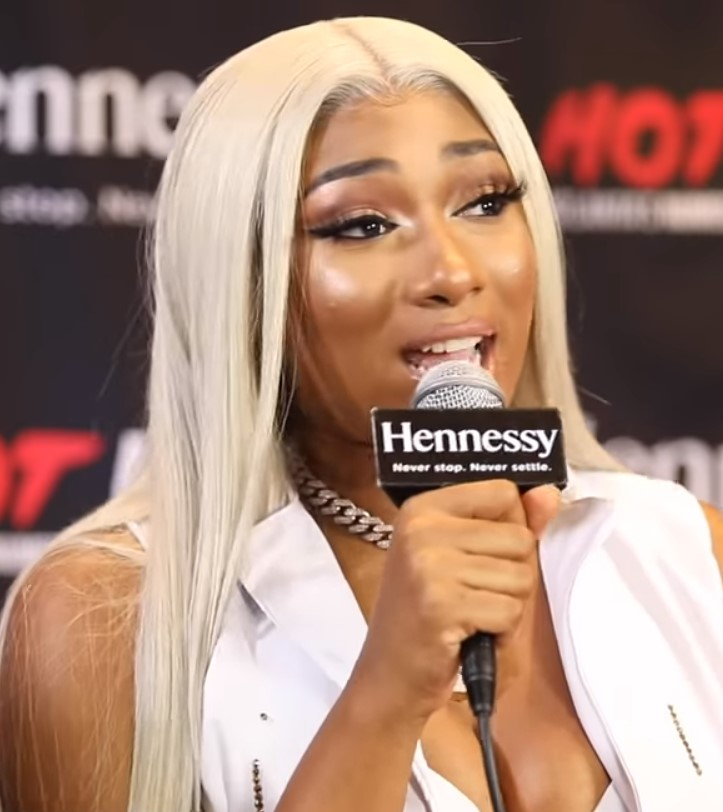
Rappers Nicki Minaj (left) and Megan Thee Stallion (right)

After several delays, "Big Foot" was released on January 29. Lil Juju did not clear the track's original beat. Minaj also released an a cappella version so that producers can make their own beat to the track. The title of the song is a reference to Megan's stature. In the song, Minaj referenced, among other things, Megan's rap flow, the 2020 shooting of Megan by Tory Lanez, Megan's contract dispute with her former record label, Megan's relationship with her ex-boyfriend and collaborator Pardison Fontaine, Megan's alleged behavior, and called Megan a liar. Minaj posted that she had four other tracks she would release if Megan responded to what she said. She also addressed Desiree Perez, CEO of Jay-Z's Roc Nation, which manages Megan, writing: "so many ppl were blind sighted & hurt by her. Allegedly. She's willing to go broke to try to replace me…? [...] Spending soooooooo much money. But she's the lil broke independent artist. Desiree, you gotta let it go". She further commented about their major financial backing of Megan and a discrepancy in her success: "if your last 5-10 releases flopped… If the internet checks don't clear outside in real life. If all the paid blogs & paid tweets = flop after flop after FLOP album ... Another manipulation so she can kick ppl to the curb after they helped her. Paid media all the time. Fraudulent awards ... Pathological & manipulative liar."

In a live discussion with Joe Budden on Twitter Spaces, Minaj said that Megan's producer "bragged" about not clearing the beat for her track, Roc Nation employs online bots, and that the root of the rapper beef is from the companies in charge, stating: "this is a dialogue between me, the machine and a bunch of different machines having to come together constantly using different people. When one fails, let's go somewhere else and try. It never works but that's the point that I wanted the world to see and that it's going to be sympathy again and it's going to be nonsense again."

Megan said on her Stationhead channel in reply to Minaj's comments: "Don't make me call Roc Nation", and added that if "Hiss" went number one she "might put the straw back in the fifth of Hennessy", referencing Minaj's alcohol line in "Big Foot".

== Reception ==
"Big Foot" is categorized as a diss track by media. The song was met with a negative response, with its production and disses toward Megan receiving criticism. Robin Murray of Clash deemed the song a miss and bore, writing that it "revels in the obvious, doesn't reveal anything new, and rejoices in cheap shots", and said that its beat is "colorful yet felt oddly dated". HuffPost's Taiyler Mitchell declared the song a miss and criticized Minaj "slut-shaming" Megan on it and her lyrics about the Lanez case. Writing for Rolling Stone, Althea Legaspi described the song as having "venomous bars" and going "in for the kill". Billboard called it a "combative" single and stated that it "touches on plenty of things [Minaj] referenced on social media previously". Revolt's Keith Nelson called it a "scathing" diss song. In an episode of his podcast, former rapper Joe Budden said that the beat was not the beat Minaj "was playing in the studio [in her live preview]. I didn't like the marriage of what she was doing to the new beat", and complimented the song with an alternative beat. In a list of worst songs of the year, Variety writer Thania Garcia included "Big Foot", remarking that Minaj was "embarrassingly outlandish in her deliveries and threats" and the song has "so many perplexing verses", with the "most unsettling portion" being the ASMR delivery at the end.

== Commercial performance ==
Upon release, "Big Foot" broke first-day records for the highest solo female rap debut in Apple Music history and the biggest solo female rap debut on YouTube in 2024. Billboard wrote that "Hiss" had "a three-day head start on "Big Foot", having been released at the very start of the tracking week, rather than Sunday at midnight." "Big Foot" debuted with 4.1 million on-demand audio streams, and received 1.1 million streams in the last day of the tracking week. The track debuted at number 23 on the Billboard Hot 100. It also debuted at number 36 on the Billboard Global 200, which is based on digital sales and online streaming from over 200 territories worldwide.

== Track listing ==
- Streaming/digital download
1. "Big Foot" – 4:22
2. "Big Foot" (a cappella) – 4:22
- Digital download – rap version
1. "Big Foot" (rap version) – 2:30
2. "Big Foot" (rap version; a cappella) – 2:30

== Charts ==
Chart performance for "Big Foot"
Chart (2024)	Peak position
Canada Hot 100 (Billboard)	62
Global 200 (Billboard)	36
Netherlands (Tipparade)	19
New Zealand Hot Singles (RMNZ)	11
UK Singles (Official Charts)	56
UK Hip Hop/R&B (Official Charts)	24
US Billboard Hot 100	23
US Hot R&B/Hip-Hop Songs (Billboard)	10

== Release history ==
Release dates and formats for "Big Foot"
Region	Date	Format	Version	Label	Ref.
Various	January 29, 2024	Digital download; streaming	Original; a cappella	Republic	
Various	January 30, 2024	Digital download	Rap version; rap version a cappella	Republic	
