= We Go Up (Nicki Minaj song) =

2022 single by Nicki Minaj featuring Fivio Foreign

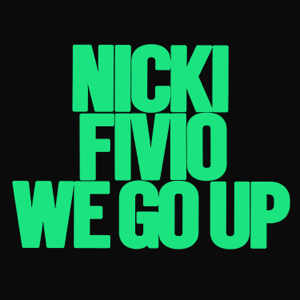

Single by Nicki Minaj featuring Fivio Foreign
- Released: March 25, 2022
- Recorded: 2021
- Genre: Drill
- Length: 4:15 (standard); 4:41 (extended)
- Label: Young Money; Republic
- Composers: Anthony Woart; Konrad Zasada; Szymon Świątczak
- Lyricists: Onika Maraj; Maxie Ryles; Joshua Goods
- Producers: Papi Yerr; Swizzy; Szamz

Nicki Minaj singles chronology
"Blick Blick" (2022)	"We Go Up" (2022)	"Super Freaky Girl" (2022)

Fivio Foreign singles chronology
"Magic City" (2022)	"We Go Up" (2022)

Music video
- "We Go Up" on YouTube

"We Go Up" is a song by rapper Nicki Minaj featuring Fivio Foreign. It was released through Young Money Entertainment and Republic Records as a single on March 25, 2022. The song was written by the artists alongside Tate Kobang and producers Papi Yerr, Swizzy, and Szamz. It was included on Minaj's first greatest hits album, Queen Radio: Volume 1 (2022).

== Background ==
"We Go Up" marks the first collaboration between Minaj and Foreign.

== Credits and personnel ==
- Nicki Minaj – lead vocals, songwriting
- Fivio Foreign – featured vocals, songwriting
- Papi Yerr – production, songwriting, programming
- Swizzy – production, songwriting, programming
- Szamz – production, songwriting, programming
- Joshua Goods – songwriting
- Aubrey "Big Juice" Delaine – mixing, recording, immersive mixing, vocal engineering
- Chris Athens – mastering
- Lou Carrao – recording

== Charts ==
Chart performance for "We Go Up"
Chart (2022)	Peak position
Global 200 (Billboard)	104
South Africa Streaming (TOSAC)	72
Canadian Digital Song Sales (Billboard)	46
US Billboard Hot 100	58
US Hot R&B/Hip-Hop Songs (Billboard)	15
