= Bahm Bahm =

2023 song by Nicki Minaj

Song by Nicki Minaj

from the album Pink Friday 2
- Released: December 8, 2023
- Genre: Hip hop
- Length: 2:21
- Label: Republic
- Songwriters: Nicki Minaj; Joshua Goods; Jessica Carpenter
- Producers: Tate Kobang; Jess Carp

Audio video
- "Bahm Bahm" on YouTube

"Bahm Bahm" is a song by rapper Nicki Minaj from her fifth studio album Pink Friday 2 (2023). The song is written by Minaj, and its producers Joshua Goods, and Jessica Carpenter. The song charted at number 95 on the BIllboard Hot 100.

== Background and release ==
Initially supposed to be an outtake from Pink Friday 2, "Bahm Bahm" was first previewed by Nicki Minaj on her Instagram account, where she posted a video featuring the song on 10 October 2023. She put the song up as a free download on her official website a few days later on 14 October. Minaj shared on Instagram Live that the reason the song was scrapped from the album was that she "didn’t like it for her album". The cover art of "Bahm Bahm" displays a pink crown.

The song was illegally posted on streaming services before the release of Pink Friday 2, causing Minaj to demand that it being taken down. The illegal upload managed to reach number 14 on Apple Music's top Hip-Hop and Rap Songs chart.

Despite originally being scrapped from the album, "Bahm Bahm" made it to the final tracklist of Pink Friday 2 on 8 December 2023.

== Reception ==
Megan Armstrong from Uproxx took note on how the song's "beat is immediately enticing", and how Minaj "doubles down on her well-earned confidence" with some bars. Hanif Abdurraqib from The New Yorker reflected on how Minaj "excels, as she often has, in finding the percussive element in her vocals, as on “Bahm Bahm,” where she emphasizes every consonant in the chorus, creating a kind of separate beat in the gaps between the song's drums". Avery Heeringa from Study Breaks characterized the song as "bouncy" and assessed how it "showcases the Minaj fans know and love — one who effortlessly spits bar after bar atop a sparkling instrumental". Emma Wilkes from NME encapsulated the song as "confident", describing how Minaj is on "characteristically sassy form" on the track. Bernadette Giacomazzo from HipHopDX wrote that Minaj "fortifies her rap reign" with the song, calling it "flex-heavy". Odunmorayo Oke from The Guardian outlined how the song has "hard-hitting beats" for those who like them.

== Charts ==
Chart performance for "Bahm Bahm"
Chart (2023)	Peak position
US Billboard Hot 100	95
US Hot R&B/Hip-Hop Songs (Billboard)	27
US Hot Rap Songs (Billboard)	25
