= Pink Friday 2 =

2023 studio album by Nicki Minaj

- Standard edition cover

Studio album by Nicki Minaj
- Released: December 8, 2023
- Recorded: 2019–2023
- Studio: Harbor Studios (Malibu)
- Genres: Hip-hop; R&B; pop
- Length: 70:14
- Label: Republic
- Producers: Finneas; Tate Kobang; Hollywood Cole; YG! Beats; ATL Jacob; Murda Beatz; OJ Finessey; DB!; Hendrix Smoke; Kuji; Boi-1da; Fierce; Apollo Parker; 116; YogiTheProducer; DJ Smallz 732; FnZ; Keanu Beats; BoogzDaBeast; Slade Da Monster; Go Grizzly; Cheeze Beatz; Basbeats; Melio Sounds; J Reid; Dr. Luke; Malibu Babie; Vaughn Oliver; Aaron Joseph; Jess Carp; Don Cannon; Sean Momberger; B Ham; Vincent "Life" Shaw; Bnyx; SadPony; Beau Nox; TooDope!; Frankie Bash; Bone Collector; Habib Defoundoux

Nicki Minaj chronology
Queen Radio: Volume 1 (2022)	Pink Friday 2 (2023)

Singles from Pink Friday 2
- 1. "Super Freaky Girl" Released: August 12, 2022; 2. "Red Ruby Da Sleeze" Released: March 3 2023; 3. "Last Time I Saw You" Released: September 1 2023; 4. "Everybody" Released: January 9, 2024; 5. "FTCU" Released: January 30, 2024

Pink Friday 2 is the fifth studio album by Trinidadian rapper Nicki Minaj, released on December 8, 2023, through Republic Records. A sequel to Minaj's debut album, Pink Friday (2010), it fuses sounds from various genres with hip-hop, R&B and pop. Its lyrical topics include grief, mental health, self-doubt, self-confidence, achievements, motherhood, and other contemporary reflections. The album includes collaborations with J. Cole, Drake, Lil Wayne, Future, Lil Uzi Vert, 50 Cent, Monica, and Keyshia Cole, while tracks by Billie Eilish, The Notorious B.I.G., Cyndi Lauper, Rick James, and others are sampled.

Pink Friday 2 debuted at number one on the US Billboard 200, making Minaj the first female rapper in history to have three number-one albums. It earned over 228,000 album-equivalent units in its first week, with 92,000 coming from pure album sales. Internationally, it peaked in the top ten in Australia, Canada, Ireland, the Netherlands, New Zealand, Norway, Switzerland, and the United Kingdom. The album received generally positive reviews from critics, who praised Minaj's consistency and innovation but criticized the use of samples.

Pink Friday 2 was supported by five singles: "Super Freaky Girl", "Red Ruby da Sleeze", "Last Time I Saw You", "Everybody" featuring Lil Uzi Vert, and "FTCU". The lead single "Super Freaky Girl" is certified double platinum in the US, and marked Minaj's first solo number-one on the Billboard Hot 100, while all the other singles peaked within the top 25. Pink Friday 2 was certified platinum in March 2024. Two extended editions of the album were released. In March 2024, Minaj embarked on the Pink Friday 2 World Tour, which became the fourth-highest-grossing concert tour by a hip-hop artist in history and the highest-grossing tour by a female rapper.

== Background and development ==
In June 2019, Minaj mentioned on The Tonight Show Starring Jimmy Fallon that she had begun work on a new album with no official release date at the time and stated that she had not titled it yet. In September, Minaj announced her retirement from hip-hop; however, she later withdrew her statement and apologized for her false announcement. In an interview with Elle that month, Minaj stated that the album would be, "fierce, fun, and unapologetic" and spoke about the project's ultimate sound.

It's probably the most excited I've been about an album release in a really long time. I'm happy that we're not making my fans wait for another album like I've done in the past. This one incorporates all the things people love about Nicki, but it also just has a way bigger sound, so it goes perfectly with the collection.

On June 29, 2020, Minaj tweeted, "PF2" and "MEMORIES" which went on to be revealed as the initials of the album and a song. In May 2023, she teased that the album "is the best thing that will come out of 2023 & will raise the bar to new & unreachable heights", and that its accompanying tour "will be hailed as 'genius.' That's it & that's all."

== Release ==
On June 5, 2023, Minaj initially announced the release date of the album would be October 20. On June 29, she officially announced that the album would be titled Pink Friday 2, and that the release date would be pushed back to November 17. In September, she debuted an unreleased track from the album titled "Big Difference" during her performance at the 2023 MTV Video Music Awards. On October 25, Minaj announced that the album's release date was postponed to her birthday, December 8.

In November, as part of weekly surprises leading up to the album release, Minaj teased a surprise that she and her fans alike were awaiting for a long time, making her fans trend "#TellUsNicki" number one on Twitter before teasing the surprise any further. The following day, it was revealed that she was the cover feature for the December 2023 issue of US Vogue, in which she spoke about recording her new album which "was written from the vantage point of a woman who has gotten so many of the things she dreamed about".

Pink Friday 2 was released on December 8, 2023 through Republic Records, and made available for digital download and streaming as a 22-track album. The album was also available in several physical versions, which consisted of four vinyl editions (three retailer-exclusive versions each with different covers) and two CD variants (standard and signed). The physical versions only included 10 tracks, which was theorized to be because the remainder were not finished in time for pressing and release. On December 14, 2023, an extended edition, titled Gag City Deluxe, was released through Minaj's webstore and made available to streaming platforms a day later. On January 13, 2024, another extended version, labeled the Gag City Pluto Edition, was also released. In August 2024, Minaj announced a deluxe version of the album, titled Gag City Reloaded, would be released on September 13; she performed music from the deluxe during the second US leg of her Pink Friday 2 World Tour. However, on September 15, she announced that she scrapped the deluxe in favor of working on her next album.

== Title and artwork ==
The album's title was described as a callback to Minaj's Pink Friday (2010) with Minaj also confirming it as a sequel. Minaj first shared one of two official cover arts for the album in September 2023, depicting the rapper in an all-white Vetements ensemble traveling on a roofless metropolitan subway floating above pink clouds. On October 6, she shared the second album cover, which depicted her in an all-pink gown revealing her midriff and surrounded by a billowing pink satin sheet in front of a black background. In the remaining weeks leading up to the release, Minaj shared four additional album cover variations for vinyl and digital release, all of which were shot by British photographer Charlotte Rutherford.

== Musical style and lyrics ==
Pink Friday 2 comprises a variety of sounds fused primarily with hip-hop, R&B and pop. Lyrical topics include grief, mental health, self-doubt, self-confidence, achievements, motherhood, and other present-day reflections. The album opens with "Are You Gone Already" which samples Billie Eilish's "When the Party's Over". On the song, Minaj raps about her father's death and "love, loss, guilt, and fear". This is followed by "Barbie Dangerous" which was an interpolation of the Notorious B.I.G.'s "Notorious Thugs". Billboard described the song as a "lyrical exercise for the rap legend as she breezes through the Hollywood Cole production". "FTCU" samples "Fuck the Club Up" by Waka Flocka Flame and was called a standout on the album. This is followed with "Beep Beep" and "Fallin 4 U" which are both "powered by a catchy chorus". "Let Me Calm Down" featuring J.Cole spoke on Minaj's "grievances against her lover" and "explores the complexity of adult relationships". Cole's rap echoes Minaj's where he "relates to Minaj's struggle, he takes a jab at the critics and references one of [his] most chaotic public relationship fall-outs".

"RNB" saw Minaj reuniting with her mentor, Lil Wayne, and singer Tate Kobang. The R&B song was an acronym for "Real Nigga Bitch". "Pink Birthday" was described as a "new birthday anthem" while "Needle" featuring Drake was called an anthem "oozing with island vibes". Minaj revealed that the song was originally intended for Drake's album For All the Dogs. This was followed by pop-inspired songs, "Cowgirl" featuring Lourdiz and "Everybody" featuring Lil Uzi Vert. The latter sampled "Move Your Feet" by Junior Senior. "Big Difference" and "Red Ruby da Sleeze" were both released prior to the album's release and saw Minaj boasting of her legacy and impact on the music industry. "Forward from Trini" saw Minaj showcasing her "Caribbean pride while connecting to her Trinidadian roots". Both the next songs, "Pink Friday Girls" and "Super Freaky Girl" sampled high-profile songs including "Girls Just Wanna Have Fun" by Cyndi Lauper and "Super Freak" by Rick James. This was followed with "Bahm Bahm", "My Life" and "Nicki Hendrix" featuring Future with the second song sampling "Heart of Glass" by Blondie.

"Blessings" featuring Gospel singer Tasha Cobbs Leonard was called a "palette cleanser from the dessert section" of Pink Friday 2 and saw Minaj rapping about "giving up the glory to God". "Last Time I Saw You" was compared to Minaj's 2018 song "Come See About Me". The song has a "guitar-driven instrumental". The standard album ends with "Just the Memories" which was called an "ethereal album closer" and saw Minaj rapping about the dark hurdles of her childhood, her come-up, and her subsequent legacy.

The Gag City Deluxe edition of the album features a remix of "Beep Beep" with 50 Cent and a new track titled "Love Me Enough" with Monica and Keyshia Cole. The latter song saw Minaj rapping about "self-love, building yourself back up after a bad relationship, and ultimately putting yourself first". The Gag City Pluto edition of the album featured "Press Play" with Future.

== Promotion and tour ==
With over $108 million in revenue based on the first 70 shows, Minaj's Pink Friday 2 World Tour concluded as the fourth-highest-grossing tour by a rapper or hip-hop artist in history, the highest-grossing tour by a female rapper, and the first among female rappers to surpass US$100 million in revenue. It also made Minaj the fifth Black female artist in history to surpass the mark from a single tour.

=== Gag City ===
Prior to the album's release, Minaj's fans came together to begin an online marketing campaign and created an AI-generated city called "Gag City", which the rapper herself had previously coined and acknowledged on social media. Yahoo! Finance described the concept as "the pink metropolis inhabited by stans and brands alike," whereas Forbes described it as a "hyper-futuristic, uber-pink digital town complete with the same pink, dreamlike aesthetic featured in the album's cover art."

The campaign gained major traction and saw participation from a variety of celebrities including Tyla, Bia, and Tyga. Additionally, multiple companies and brands also participated in the trend by announcing their arrival to "Gag City", including Spotify, Netflix, Bing, Converse, Genius, Amazon, Empire State Building, Chili's, Oreo, KFC, McDonald's, among others. The campaign was dubbed a "viral win" for Minaj.

=== Singles ===
In July 2022, Minaj previewed on her social media a song from the album that was originally titled "Freaky Girl", with the clip going viral and garnering over 20 million views on Instagram in its first day. The song was renamed "Super Freaky Girl", and was released as the album's lead single on August 12, 2022, a month after its preview. Its music video, directed by Joseph Kahn, was uploaded onto Minaj's YouTube account on September 1. The song debuted at number one on the US Billboard Hot 100 and the Hot R&B/Hip-Hop Songs chart a month later, marking Minaj's third number-one song on the Hot 100. The single became one of Minaj's biggest solo hits, spending 11 weeks inside the top 10 of the Hot 100, 10 of which were consecutive.

"Red Ruby da Sleeze" was initially released as a promotional single on March 3, 2023. Minaj called it her "street record" before her "next official single". It was officially sent to rhythmic contemporary radio on March 14, 2023, becoming the album's second single. Its music video, directed by Grizz and filmed in Trinidad and Tobago, was uploaded on YouTube on May 13. The song peaked at number 13 on the Hot 100 and at number four on the Hot R&B/Hip-Hop Songs chart. It was certified platinum by the RIAA in 2024 for shipping over one million units in the United States

"Last Time I Saw You" was released as the album's third single on September 1, 2023. The song peaked at number 23 on the Hot 100 and at number 6 on the Hot R&B/Hip-Hop Songs chart. Minaj performed the song at the 2023 MTV Video Music Awards.

"Everybody", featuring Lil Uzi Vert, was sent to contemporary hit radio in the United States on January 9, 2024, serving as the album's fourth single. The song debuted at number 26 on the Hot 100, and later peaked at number 24.

"FTCU" was released as the album's fifth and final single on January 10, 2024, with an EP of various versions of the song also made available for streaming and digital download. The song impacted rhythmic contemporary radio in the United States on January 30, 2024. It debuted at number 42 on the Hot 100, and later peaked at number 15. A remix, subtitled the "Sleeze Mix", featuring Travis Scott, Chris Brown, and Sexyy Red was released on April 19, 2024.

While not released as a single, on March 3, 2024, Minaj released an extended version of the song "Let Me Calm Down" featuring J. Cole.

== Critical reception ==
Professional ratings
Aggregate scores
Source	Rating
AnyDecentMusic?	6.6/10
Metacritic	70/100
Review scores
Source	Rating
AllMusic	3/5 stars
And It Don't Stop	A−
Clash	8/10
Evening Standard	4/5 stars
The Guardian	4/5 stars
The Independent	3/5 stars
MusicOMH	3/5 stars
NME	4/5 stars
Pitchfork	6.5/10
PopMatters	7/10

Pink Friday 2 was met with generally favorable reviews by music critics. Metacritic, which uses a weighted average, assigned the album a score of 70 out of 100, based on twelve reviews, indicating "generally favorable reviews". Fred Thomas of AllMusic deemed most songs "exhilarating and fun" but said the album "lacks the cohesion and self-editing that would make it a rightful follow-up to her 2010 mainstream arrival". NME's Nick Levine wrote that while it is "probably too long, [...] Minaj paces it sharply", and it "feels like a consolidation and refinement of everything Minaj can do". Alexis Petridis of The Guardian highlighted Minaj's thematic variety, "lyrical muscles" and "considerable skills on the microphone" and praised the production and "moody atmospherics".

The Evening Standard's David Smyth described Pink Friday 2 as "an expansion of what she can do rather than a complete about turn." Nadine Smith of The Independent criticized Minaj's use of samples and felt that the album "shows flashes of the inventive brilliance that made Nicki such an undeniable superstar, but like so many legacy sequels, it mostly just makes you wish you were listening to the original". PopMatters' Nick Malone characterized it as "heavy on raps but finally delivering rewarding and memorable melodies when singing comes into the mix", commending its "punchier and more versatile production" and Minaj finding "new homes for her effortlessly versatile voice." Robin Murray of Clash called Pink Friday 2 an ambitious record that "mirror[s] fan-pleasing tendencies with actual artistic growth" and a "demonstration of her breadth", regarding it as "riveting in its entertainment, and gripping in its musicality."

== Commercial performance ==
Pink Friday 2 debuted at number one on the Billboard 200, earning 228,000 album-equivalent units in its first week of which 92,000 came from pure album sales, and became the largest week for female R&B/hip-hop album in 2023.

Upon the album's release, Minaj broke several records. The album became Minaj's third number-one album in the country after Pink Friday (2010) and Pink Friday: Roman Reloaded (2012), and broke her tie with Foxy Brown for the female rap artist with the most number-one albums in the country. Minaj also achieved her seventh top-ten album overall. It also sold 25,000 vinyl copies. The album dropped one place to number two in its second week, earning an additional 100,000 album-equivalent units but being beaten by Taylor Swift's 1989 (Taylor's Version). It spent 7 weeks in the top-ten region of the Billboard 200. The album was certified platinum by the Recording Industry Association of America (RIAA), for moving a million units in the US, on March 19, 2024. Pink Friday 2 was the best selling female rap album of 2023 and 2024 in the US.

The album's songs achieved 90.8 million streams in its first three days. In its first week, Pink Friday 2 received a total of 169.9 million streams, marking the highest streaming week of her career, and for a female R&B/hip-hop album in 2023. Upon its release, 14 songs from the album debuted on the Billboard Hot 100, of which two entered the top 40: "Everybody" and "Needle".

== Accolades ==
Awards and nominations for Pink Friday 2
Organization	Year	Category	Result	Ref.
BET Awards	2024	Album of the Year	Nominated	
BET Hip Hop Awards	2024	Album of the Year	Won	
Billboard Music Awards	2024	Top Rap Album	Nominated	
People's Choice Awards	2024	Album of the Year	Nominated	
XXL Awards	2024	Album of the Year	Nominated	
Clio Awards	2025	Album Launch/Artist Promotion Integrated Campaign	Bronze	

== Track listing ==
Pink Friday 2 track listing
No.	Title	Writer(s)	Producer(s)	Length
1.	"Are You Gone Already"	Onika Maraj; Finneas O'Connell	Finneas	4:30
2.	"Barbie Dangerous"	Maraj; Joshua Goods; Kameron Cole; Kendall Taylor; Christopher Wallace; Anthony Henderson; Bryon McCane; Steven Howse; Sean Combs; Steven Jordan	Tate Kobang; Hollywood Cole; YG! Beats	2:12
3.	"FTCU"	Maraj; Juaquin Malphurs; Joshua Luellen; Jacob Canady	ATL Jacob	2:52
4.	"Beep Beep"	Maraj; Shane Lindstrom; Gavin Valencia	Murda Beatz; OJ Finessey	1:35
5.	"Fallin 4 U"	Maraj; Canady; Darryon Bunton	ATL Jacob; DB!	3:50
6.	"Let Me Calm Down" (featuring J. Cole)	Maraj; Jermaine Cole; Canady; Derrick Miller; Ofer Ishai	ATL Jacob; Hendrix Smoke; Kuji	4:04
7.	"RNB" (featuring Lil Wayne and Tate Kobang)	Maraj; Dwayne Carter; Goods; Taylor; Tomislav Ratešić	Kobang; YG! Beats; Dystinkt Beats	3:04
8.	"Pink Birthday"	Maraj; Matthew Samuels; Amir Sims; Chase Lieberman; Shubhkarman Pruthi; Jacques Webster; Leland Wayne; Michael Dean; Sonny Uwaezuoke; Peter Mellin	Boi-1da; Fierce; Apollo Parker; 116	2:08
9.	"Needle" (featuring Drake)	Maraj; Aubrey Graham; Samuels; Johann Deterville; Rahiem Hurlock	Boi-1da; YogiTheProducer	3:55
10.	"Cowgirl" (featuring Lourdiz)	Maraj; Alyssa Cantu; Łukasz Gottwald; Rocco Valdes; Ryan Ogren	Dr. Luke	3:36
11.	"Everybody" (featuring Lil Uzi Vert)	Maraj; Symere Woods; Isaiah Henry; Goods; Jesper Mortensen	DJ Smallz 732; Kobang^{[c]}	3:00
12.	"Big Difference"	Maraj; Michael Mulé; Isaac De Boni; Keanu Torres; Jahmal Gwin; Marcus Slade; Derrick Gray	FnZ; Keanu Beats; BoogzDaBeast; Slade Da Monsta	3:11
13.	"Red Ruby da Sleeze"	Maraj; Kevin Price; Darryl McCorkell; Goods; Kirsten Spencer; Josiah Muhammad; Irvin Winslow; Lumidee Cedeño; Teddy Mendez; Edwin Perez; Steven Marsden	Go Grizzly; Cheeze Beatz	3:34
14.	"Forward from Trini" (featuring Skillibeng and Skeng)	Maraj; Emwah Warmington; Kevon Douglas; Sebastian Loers; Emelio Lynch; Rowan Melhado; Dave Kelly	Basbeats; Melio Sounds^{[a]}	2:33
15.	"Pink Friday Girls"	Maraj; Jeremy Reid; Cantu; Ogren; Robert Hazard	J Reid	2:46
16.	"Super Freaky Girl"	Maraj; Gottwald; Lauren Miller; Vaughn Oliver; Aaron Joseph; Gamal Lewis; James Johnson Jr.; Alonzo Miller	Dr. Luke; Malibu Babie; Oliver; Joseph	2:50
17.	"Bahm Bahm"	Maraj; Goods; Jessica Carpenter	Kobang; Jess Carp	2:21
18.	"My Life"	Maraj; Don Cannon; Sean Momberger; Goods; Deborah Harry; Christopher Stein	Cannon; Momberger	2:44
19.	"Nicki Hendrix" (featuring Future)	Maraj; Nayvadius Wilburn; Brandon Hamlin; Vincent Shaw	B Ham; Vincent "Life" Shaw	4:24
20.	"Blessings" (featuring Tasha Cobbs Leonard)	Maraj; Natasha Leonard; Benjamin Saint Fort; Jeremiah Raisen; Christian Astrop	Bnyx; SadPony; Beau Nox	3:34
21.	"Last Time I Saw You"	Maraj; Canady; Lesidney Ragland; Colin Franken; Miller; Alex Bak	ATL Jacob; TooDope!; Frankie Bash; Hendrix Smoke; Bak	3:36
22.	"Just the Memories"	Maraj; Georges Olivier; Habib Defoundoux; Moses Davis; Lynford Marshall; Colin York; John Bristol; Jerry Butler; James Dean; John Glover	Bone Collector; Defoundoux	3:55
Total length:				70:14

Gag City deluxe edition bonus tracks
No.	Title	Writer(s)	Producer(s)	Length
23.	"Beep Beep" (featuring 50 Cent)	Maraj; Jackson; Lindstrom; Valencia	Murda Beatz; Finessey	2:27
24.	"Love Me Enough" (featuring Monica and Keyshia Cole)	Maraj; Milano; L'Étranger; Tranter; Vojtesak; Lindstrom; Monét	Murda Beatz; Charlie Handsome; L'Étranger	3:50
Total length:				76:31

Gag City Pluto edition bonus track
No.	Title	Writer(s)	Producer(s)	Length
25.	"Press Play" (featuring Future)	Maraj; Canady; Wilburn	ATL Jacob	3:21
Total length:				79:52

Notes

- ^{^[c]} signifies a co-producer
- ^{^[a]} signifies an additional producer
- The physical edition of the album features ten tracks out of 22 with a total runtime of 31 minutes and 10 seconds.

Sample credits

- "Are You Gone Already" contains samples from "When the Party's Over", written by Finneas O'Connell and performed by Billie Eilish.
- "Barbie Dangerous" contains samples from "Notorious Thugs", written by Christopher Wallace, Anthony Henderson, Bryon McCane, Steven Howse, Sean Combs, and Steven Jordan and performed by The Notorious B.I.G. and Bone Thugs-N-Harmony.
- "FTCU" contains samples from "Fuck the Club Up", written by Juaquin Malphurs and Joshua Luellen and performed by Waka Flocka Flame.
- "Pink Birthday" contains samples from "Pornography", written by Jacques Webster, Leland Wayne, Michael Dean, and Sonny Uwaezuoke and performed by Travis Scott, which itself samples "Expectation", written by Peter Mellin and performed by Ache.
- "Everybody" contains samples from "Move Your Feet", written by Jesper Mortensen and performed by Junior Senior.
- "Red Ruby da Sleeze" contains a sample of "Never Leave You (Uh Oooh, Uh Oooh)", written by Lumidee Cedeño, Teddy Mendez, Edwin Perez and Steven Marsden and performed by Lumidee.
- "Forward from Trini" contains a sample of Dave Kelly's "Stink" and "Showtime" riddims.
- "Pink Friday Girls" contains samples from "Girls Just Want to Have Fun", written by Robert Hazard and performed by Cyndi Lauper.
- "Super Freaky Girl" contains samples from "Super Freak", written by James Johnson Jr. and Alonzo Miller and performed by Rick James.
- "My Life" contains samples from "Heart of Glass", written by Debbie Harry and Chris Stein and performed by Blondie.
- "Just the Memories" contains samples from "Stop Live in a de Pass", written by Moses Davis, Lynford Marshall, Colin York, John Bristol, Jerry Butler, James Dean and John Glover and performed by Beenie Man.

== Personnel ==
Musicians

- Nicki Minaj – vocals
- Finneas – programming (track 1)
- Hollywood Cole – programming (track 2)
- YG! Beats – programming (track 2)
- Tate Kobang – programming (track 2)
- Waka Flocka Flame – background vocals (track 3)
- Southside – background vocals (track 3)
- ATL Jacob – programming (tracks 3, 6)
- OJ Finnessey – programming (track 4)
- Murda Beatz – programming (track 4)
- Kuji – programming (track 6)
- Hendrix Smoke – programming (tracks 6, 21)
- J. Cole – vocals (track 6)
- Lourdiz – background vocals (tracks 7, 15), vocals (10)
- Boi-1da – programming (tracks 8, 9), drum programming (8)
- Apollo Parker – programming (track 8)
- Fierce – programming (track 8)
- 116 – programming (track 8)
- Nana Fofie – background vocals (track 9)
- Yogi – programming (track 9)
- Drake – vocals (track 9)
- Rahiem Hurlock – voice (track 9)
- Dr. Luke – programming (tracks 10, 16)
- DJ Smallz 732 – programming (track 11)
- Tate Kobang – programming (track 11)
- Lil Uzi Vert – vocals (track 11)
- FnZ – programming (track 13)
- BoogzDaBeast – programming (track 13)
- Keanu Beats – programming (track 13)
- Slade Da Monsta – programming (track 13)
- Basbeats – programming (track 14)
- Melio Sounds – programming (track 14)
- Skillibeng – vocals (track 14)
- Skeng – vocals (track 14)
- J Reid – programming (track 15)
- Malibu Babie – programming (track 16)
- Aaron Joseph – programming (track 16)
- Vaughn Oliver – programming (track 16)
- B Ham – programming (track 19)
- Vincent Shaw – programming (track 19)
- Future – vocals (tracks 19, 25)
- Beau Nox – background vocals, programming (track 20)
- Bnyx – programming (track 20)
- Sad Pony – programming (track 20)
- Tasha Cobbs Leonard – vocals (track 20)
- Alex Bak – programming (track 21)
- Frankie Bash – programming (track 21)
- TooDope – programming (track 21)
- Keisha Renee – background vocals (track 22)
- Bone Collector – programming (track 22)
- Habib Defoundoux – programming (track 22)
- 50 Cent – vocals (track 23)
- Monica – vocals (track 24)
- Keyshia Cole – vocals (track 24)

Technical

- Chris Athens – mastering
- Rob Kinelski – mixing (tracks 1, 8, 20)
- Serban Ghenea – mixing (tracks 2–7, 10–16, 18, 19, 21, 22)
- Noel Cadastre – mixing, engineering (track 9)
- Noah Shebib – mixing (track 9)
- Aubrey Delaine – mixing (track 17), engineering (all tracks), immersive mix engineering (1–12, 14, 15, 20, 22)
- Kuldeep Chudasama – engineering (track 6)
- Clint Gibbs – engineering (track 16)
- Kalani Thompson – engineering (track 16)
- Tyler Sheppard – engineering (track 16)
- John Hanes – immersive mix engineering (tracks 13, 16, 21)
- Cristal Viramontes – vocal engineering (track 7)
- Daniel Sheehy – vocal engineering (track 7)
- Manny Galvez – vocal engineering (track 7)
- Eli Heisler – mixing assistance (tracks 1, 8, 20)
- Ruby Smith – mixing assistance (tracks 1, 8, 20)
- Bryce Bordone – mixing assistance (tracks 2–7, 10–16, 18, 19, 21, 22)
- Jack Letchinger – engineering assistance (tracks 1–3, 6–10, 14, 18, 20)
- Alexx Nielsen – engineering assistance (tracks 1–3, 6, 8–10, 14, 15, 20)
- Nico Fabito – engineering assistance (tracks 1–3, 6, 8–10, 14, 15, 20)
- Cory Williams – engineering assistance (track 12)
- Grant Horton – engineering assistance (track 16)

== Charts ==
=== Weekly charts ===
Weekly chart performance for Pink Friday 2
Chart (2023)	Peak position
Australian Albums (ARIA)	3
Australian Hip Hop/R&B Albums (ARIA)	1
Austrian Albums (Ö3 Austria)	31
Belgian Albums (Ultratop Flanders)	13
Belgian Albums (Ultratop Wallonia)	13
Canadian Albums (Billboard)	2
Danish Albums (Hitlisten)	33
Dutch Albums (Album Top 100)	7
Finnish Albums (Suomen virallinen lista)	31
French Albums (SNEP)	20
German Albums (Offizielle Top 100)	41
Hungarian Albums (MAHASZ)	32
Icelandic Albums (Tónlistinn)	39
Irish Albums (Official Charts)	9
Italian Albums (FIMI)	61
Lithuanian Albums (AGATA)	42
New Zealand Albums (RMNZ)	3
Nigerian Albums (TurnTable Top 50)	16
Norwegian Albums (VG-lista)	10
Polish Albums (ZPAV)	100
Portuguese Albums (AFP)	194
Scottish Albums (Official Charts)	23
Spanish Albums (Promusicae)	42
Swedish Albums (Sverigetopplistan)	32
Swiss Albums (Schweizer Hitparade)	6
UK Albums (Official Charts)	3
UK R&B Albums (Official Charts)	1
US Billboard 200	1
US Top R&B/Hip-Hop Albums (Billboard)	1

=== Year-end charts ===
Year-end chart performance for Pink Friday 2
Chart (2024)	Position
Australian Hip Hop/R&B Albums (ARIA)	38
New Zealand Albums (RMNZ)	41
US Billboard 200	30
US Top R&B/Hip-Hop Albums (Billboard)	8

== Certifications ==
Certifications for Pink Friday 2
Region	Certification	Certified units/sales
Brazil (Pro-Música Brasil)	Gold	20,000^{‡}
New Zealand (RMNZ)	Gold	7,500^{‡}
United Kingdom (BPI)	Gold	100,000^{‡}
United States (RIAA)	Platinum	1,000,000^{‡}
^{‡} Sales+streaming figures based on certification alone.

== Release history ==
Release dates and formats for Pink Friday 2
Region	Date	Format(s)	Edition	Label	Ref.
Various	December 8, 2023	CD; digital download; streaming; vinyl LP	Standard	Republic	
United States	December 11, 2023	Digital download	D2C Version 1	Republic	
United States	December 13, 2023	Digital download	D2C Version 2	Republic	
United States	December 14, 2023	Digital download	Gag City Deluxe	Republic	
Various	December 15, 2023	Streaming	Gag City Deluxe	Republic	
Various	January 13, 2024	Digital download; streaming	Gag City Pluto	Republic	

== See also ==
- List of Billboard 200 number-one albums of 2023
