= Tek It =

Single by Cafuné

from the album Running
- Released: November 5, 2019
- Genre: Indie pop; indie rock; alt-pop
- Length: 3:13
- Songwriters: Noah Yoo; Sedona Schat
- Producers: Yoo; Schat

Cafuné singles chronology
"Least Coast/Little Broken Part" (2018)	"Tek It" (2019)	"Friction" (2019)

Music video
- "Tek It" on YouTube

"Tek It", also called "Tek It (I Watch the Moon)", is a song by the American indie pop duo Cafuné. It was later included on their album Running (2021). The song gained prominence on TikTok in early 2022.

== Background ==
"Tek It" went viral on TikTok in early 2022 due to its use in anime edits and other trends on the platform, which prompted Elektra Records to sign the duo in June 2022. "Tek It" was sampled by American rapper Lil Uzi Vert for their track "Red Moon", released on December 25, 2023.

== Commercial performance ==
The song reached number 1 on the Bubbling Under Hot 100, 4 on the Hot Rock & Alternative Songs, 70 on the Irish Singles Chart, and 72 on the UK Singles Chart. It was certified 4× Platinum by the Recording Industry Association of America, 2× Platinum by Music Canada, Platinum by the British Phonographic Industry, and Recorded Music NZ, and Gold by IFPI Switzerland.

== Certifications ==
Certifications for "Tek It"
Region	Certification	Certified units/sales
Canada (Music Canada)	2× Platinum	160,000^{‡}
France (SNEP)	Gold	100,000^{‡}
New Zealand (RMNZ)	2× Platinum	60,000^{‡}
Poland (ZPAV)	Gold	25,000^{‡}
Switzerland (IFPI Switzerland)	Gold	10,000^{‡}
United Kingdom (BPI)	Platinum	600,000^{‡}
United States (RIAA)	4× Platinum	4,000,000^{‡}
^{‡} Sales+streaming figures based on certification alone.
