= Red Moon (song) =

2023 single by Lil Uzi Vert

Single by Lil Uzi Vert
- Released: December 25, 2023
- Genre: Emo rap; trap
- Length: 2:51
- Label: Generation Now; Atlantic
- Songwriters: Symere Woods; Bryan Simmons; Gregory Davis; Michael Mulé; Isaac De Boni; Kenneth Smith, Jr.; Noah Yoo
- Producers: TM88; Slo Meezy; C$D Sid; FnZ; Macnificent; Yoo

Lil Uzi Vert singles chronology
"NFL" (2023)	"Red Moon" (2023)	"Everybody" (2024)

Music video
- "Red Moon" on YouTube

"Red Moon" is a song by American rapper Lil Uzi Vert, released on December 25, 2023 as a standalone single. Produced by TM88, Slo Meezy, C$D Sid, FnZ, Macnificent and Noah Yoo, the song contains samples of "7969 Santa" by Drake and "Tek It" by Cafuné.

== Background ==
Lil Uzi Vert teased the song through Instagram Live on December 11, 2023. The song was released exclusively on YouTube alongside a music video on December 25, 2023, before being released to streaming services on December 26.

== Composition ==
The song uses trap and drum-and-bass percussion, sampling "7969" and "Tek It" by Cafuné. Centering on heartbreak and change, it finds Lil Uzi Vert singing about a failing relationship and their solitude.

== Music video ==
The music video was directed by Be EL Be. It opens with Lil Uzi Vert dressing in a bathroom, putting on their clothes backwards, and sitting alone in a hotel room by the window with a sad expression, before taking a walk around the city. They arrive at a beach at dusk, where they are seen running toward a red moon. A close-up of Uzi crying is shown. The clip ends with a shot of a hilly mountainside and messages appearing on the screen which read: "If someone can be away from you, let them be. Its [sic] better to be alone than losing yourself for approval." and "Love isn't real, but with my imagination, I can make anything real."

The music video was filmed in Auckland, New Zealand.

== Charts ==
Chart performance for "Red Moon"
Chart (2024)	Peak position
US Bubbling Under Hot 100 (Billboard)	17
US Hot R&B/Hip-Hop Songs (Billboard)	39
