= Cafuné =

American indie pop duo

- Origin: New York City, U.S.
- Genres: Alt-pop; indie pop; dream pop; indie rock; electropop; synth-pop; deep house
- Years active: 2014–present
- Labels: Aurelians Club; Elektra
- Members: Noah Yoo; Sedona Schat

Cafuné is an American indie pop duo formed in 2014 by singer-songwriter Sedona Schat and producer Noah Yoo. The two met at New York University. Their single "Tek It", from their debut album Running (2021), went viral, and they were subsequently signed to Elektra Records in 2022.

== History ==
Noah Yoo was raised in Fairfax, Virginia, where he grew up playing violin and eventually playing guitar in high school bands. He and Sedona Schat both began attending the Clive Davis Institute at New York University in 2012, where the two met and bonded over their appreciation of Two Door Cinema Club.

Sedona Schat grew up in Gardnerville, Nevada where she graduated from Douglas High School. Her family owns a bakery chain on the west coast, Schat's Bakeries. She found a love for music in her youth and was known for her local performances before moving to New York for college.

In their sophomore year, Yoo worked on one of Schat's songs, and Cafuné was started as a side project for both of them the following year when Yoo briefly lived with Schat. Yoo also worked as a staffer for Pitchfork. Both Yoo and Schat attended a masterclass session with Pharrell Williams among other selected CDI students held in the New York University Tisch School of the Arts in 2016.

Cafuné released their debut single, "Letting Go", in 2014. They released their debut EP, Love Songs for Other People, in 2015. Running, their debut album, was written and produced by the duo at their homes over several years, recorded throughout the COVID-19 pandemic in 2020, and released on July 20, 2021, through their own label, Aurelians Club. The song reconsider was mixed by Kyle Pulley at Headroom Studios. The album featured the singles "High", "Want Me Out", and "Tek It", the last of which went viral on TikTok in early 2022 due to its use in anime edits and other trends on the platform, which prompted Elektra Records to sign the duo in June 2022. They opened for Chvrches on their summer 2022 tour.

"Tek It" was sampled by Lil Uzi Vert for their track "Red Moon", released on December 25, 2023. That year, the duo released two new extended plays: Love Songs for the End in October, and its follow-up, Versions for the End, in December.

On May 28, 2025, the band released their new single, "e-Asphyxiation", along with an announcement for a new album, "Bite Reality", scheduled for release on September 12, 2025.

== Musical style ==
Cafuné's music has been described as alt-pop, indie pop, dream pop, and indie rock. Their earlier music was electropop and synth-pop, and their music became more rock-oriented after they played at various college shows.

== Discography ==
=== Studio albums ===
List of studio albums with selected details
Title	Details
Running	Released: July 19, 2021; Label: Aurelians Club, Elektra; Format: Digital download, streaming
Bite Reality	Released: September 12, 2025; Label: Aurelians Club, SoundON; Format: Digital download, streaming

=== Live albums ===
List of live albums with selected details
Title	Details
Cafuné on Audiotree Live	Released: May 2, 2023; Label: Audiotree; Format: Digital download, streaming

=== Extended plays ===
List of extended plays with selected details
Title	Details
Love Songs for Other People	Released: December 11, 2015; Label: Aurelians Club; Format: Digital download, streaming
Love Songs for the End	Released: October 13, 2023; Label: Aurelians Club; Format: Digital download, streaming
Versions for the End	Released: December 1, 2023; Label: Aurelians Club; Format: Digital Download, streaming

=== Singles ===
List of singles, with year released, selected chart positions, certifications, and album name shown
Title	Year	Peak chart positions				Certifications	Album
Title	Year	US Bub.	US Rock	IRE	UK	Certifications	Album
"Letting Go"	2014	—	—	—	—		Non-album single
"Fall Asleep Slow"	2015	—	—	—	—		Love Songs for Other People
"Warm Body"	2015	—	—	—	—		Love Songs for Other People
"Don't You Forget"	2016	—	—	—	—		Non-album singles
"How Can I Explain"	2017	—	—	—	—		Non-album singles
"OK on My Own"	2017	—	—	—	—		Non-album singles
"Least Coast/Little Broken Part"	2018	—	—	—	—		Non-album singles
"Tek It"	2019	1	4	70	72	RIAA: 4× Platinum; BPI: Platinum; IFPI SWI: Gold; MC: 2× Platinum; RMNZ: 2× Platinum	Running
"Friction"	2019	—	—	—	—		Non-album single
"Want Me Out"	2019	—	—	—	—		Running
"Not Even Here"	2020	—	—	—	—		Non-album single
"High"	2021	—	—	—	—		Running
"Talk"	2021	—	—	—	—		Running
"Perspective"	2023	—	—	—	—		Love Songs for the End
"Demise"	2023	—	—	—	—		Love Songs for the End
"Unchained Memory"	2023	—	—	—	—		Love Songs for the End
"—" denotes a recording that did not chart or was not released in that territory.
