= Everybody (Nicki Minaj song) =

2023 song by Nicki Minaj featuring Lil Uzi Vert

Single by Nicki Minaj featuring Lil Uzi Vert

from the album Pink Friday 2
- Released: January 9, 2024
- Recorded: 2023
- Genre: Jersey club; hip hop
- Length: 3:00
- Label: Republic
- Songwriters: Onika Maraj; Symere Woods; Isaiah Henry; Joshua Goods; Jesper Mortensen
- Producers: DJ Smallz 732; Tate Kobang

Nicki Minaj singles chronology
"Last Time I Saw You" (2023)	"Everybody" (2024)	"FTCU" (2024)

Lil Uzi Vert singles chronology
"Red Moon" (2023)	"Everybody" (2024)	"Chanel Boy" (2025)

Audio video
- "Everybody" on YouTube

"Everybody" is a song by the rapper Nicki Minaj featuring Lil Uzi Vert, from Minaj's fifth album Pink Friday 2 (2023). It was released on January 9, 2024, to US rhythmic contemporary and contemporary hit radio through Republic Records, serving as the album's fourth single. Produced by DJ Smallz 732 and Tate Kobang, the song contains samples of "Move Your Feet" by Junior Senior. The solo version of the song features on the physical version of Pink Friday 2.

== Composition ==
Nicki Minaj explained how she wrote the song in a post on X:

This is mad funny b/c that was the song I wrote in 5 mins one day for Call Of Duty. Once I kept it for my album, I still didn't even rlly know if it made sense on PF2. I didn't wanna send it to Uzi b/c I thought he’d be over it. Instead he was like this hard af! Uzicito

The song samples "Move Your Feet" by Junior Senior, with the sampled word "body" used to end every line. Stylistically, the song incorporates elements of Jersey club.

== Critical reception ==
The song received generally positive reviews. Frazier Tharpe of GQ wrote "'Everybody' has all the makings of a party pleaser: high energy, an earworm of a sample, and deceptively simple lyrics, with Nicki and Uzi punching each line in on Junior Senior's all-too-familiar mewl of 'Everybody-y-y.' It's the kind of song where a casual listener doesn't need to know what the hell Nicki's talking about to have fun, but the rest of us can appreciate the demented thrill of her spitting things like 'We gon' spin and kill [Everybody!]'—threatening drive-bys, by way of one of early-aughts club music's most earnest feel-good hits." Nick Levine of NME described the song as a "frantic banger" and commented "It's the quirkiest moment on an album where Minaj is generally more restrained than in the past." Clash's Robin Murray stated "There's a heartening element of familiarity here, too, with Nicki assembling some crowd-pleasing samples. Just check out 'Everybody' – a Junior Senior aided throwback – to see what we mean. It's fun as hell, and deliciously entertaining." Alexis Petridis of The Guardian wrote the song "is both a potential hit and annoying enough to make "Barbie World" sound understated – but they feel like outliers on an album less reliant on immediately recognisable hooks than moody atmospherics, creative production and Minaj's considerable skills on the microphone." Pitchfork's Julianne Escobedo Shepherd regarded the song as a "grower". Reviewing Pink Friday 2 for The New York Times, Jon Caramanica stated "In the last couple of years, instantly recognizable references have become cheat codes for pop and rap stars, but obvious sampling has also been a staple in emergent drill and club music scenes", before writing that on the song "Minaj is toying with the way those two approaches aren't so dissimilar. It's one of the most invigorating performances she gives here, because she is an elastic enough rapper to both rough up pop sheen and smooth out underground rowdiness at once." Maura Johnston of Rolling Stone commented that "Move Your Feet" "gets chopped up enough that it's made frantic on the Lil Uzi Vert-assisted gasconade 'Everybody'". Nick Malone of PopMatters wrote "Interpolating Junior Senior's 'Move Your Feet' into an infectious and endless string of 'body' punchlines, it's uncharted territory for Minaj and dancefloor gold. (It's worth noting that despite the sample-heavy beat, it avoids the stench of thirsty radio bait present on 'Super Freaky Girl'.)" Ben Devlin of MusicOMH stated the song "may be a blatant attempt to cash in on 'Just Wanna Rock', but its formula works and the Junior Senior chops are great fun, darting in between the booming Jersey Club beats courtesy of DJ Smallz 732."

== Accolades ==
Awards and nominations for Everybody
Organization	Year	Category	Result	Ref.
BET Awards	2024	Best Collaboration	Nominated	
BET Hip Hop Awards	2024	Best Collaboration	Nominated	

== Charts ==
=== Weekly charts ===
Weekly chart performance for "Everybody"
Chart (2023–2024)	Peak position
Canada Hot 100 (Billboard)	46
Global 200 (Billboard)	45
Ireland (IRMA)	30
New Zealand Hot Singles (RMNZ)	4
Nigeria (TurnTable Top 100)	51
UK Singles (Official Charts)	26
UK Hip Hop/R&B (Official Charts)	7
US Billboard Hot 100	24
US Hot R&B/Hip-Hop Songs (Billboard)	5
US Pop Airplay (Billboard)	13
US Rhythmic Airplay (Billboard)	1

=== Year-end charts ===
2024 year-end chart performance for "Everybody"
Chart (2024)	Position
US Billboard Hot 100	71
US Hot R&B/Hip-Hop Songs (Billboard)	24
US Mainstream Top 40 (Billboard)	41
US Rhythmic (Billboard)	12

== Certifications and sales ==
Certifications and sales for "Everybody"
Region	Certification	Certified units/sales
New Zealand (RMNZ)	Gold	15,000^{‡}
^{‡} Sales+streaming figures based on certification alone.

== Release history ==
Release dates and formats for "Everybody"
Region	Date	Format	Label	Ref.
United States	January 9, 2024	Contemporary hit radio	Young Money; Republic	
United States	January 9, 2024	Rhythmic contemporary radio	Young Money; Republic	
