= Super Freaky Girl =

2022 single by Nicki Minaj

Single by Nicki Minaj

from the album Pink Friday 2
- Released: August 12, 2022
- Genre: Pop rap
- Length: 2:50
- Label: Republic
- Composers: James Johnson; Alonzo Miller; Lukasz Gottwald; Aaron Joseph; Lauren Miller; Vaughn Oliver; Stanley Burrell
- Lyricists: Onika Maraj; Gamal Lewis
- Producers: Dr. Luke; Malibu Babie; Vaughn Oliver; Aaron Joseph

Nicki Minaj singles chronology
"We Go Up" (2022)	"Super Freaky Girl" (2022)	"Love in the Way" (2022)

Music video
- "Super Freaky Girl" on YouTube

Roman Remix cover

Lyric video
- "Super Freaky Girl" (Roman Remix) on YouTube

"Super Freaky Girl" is a song by rapper Nicki Minaj from her fifth studio album, Pink Friday 2 (2023). It was released on August 12, 2022, through Republic Records as the lead single from the album. It is an upbeat, raunchy song that samples Rick James' 1981 single "Super Freak," as Minaj raps about a girl having sexual fantasies and endeavors, while also boasting about her career. It received comparisons to Minaj's 2014 single "Anaconda," as both tracks include classic samples and sexual lyrics.

Upon its release, the song broke the Spotify record for the biggest debut for a solo female rap song. The song debuted at number one on the US Billboard Hot 100, which marked the third US number-one single of Minaj's career as well as her first number-one song as a solo artist. Internationally, the song has topped the charts in Australia and New Zealand, becoming Minaj's first number-one single in both countries. The song also reached the top ten in multiple other countries including Canada, Hungary, Iceland, Ireland, Philippines, South Africa, and the United Kingdom. The song won Best Hip-Hop at the 2023 MTV Video Music Awards and Best Song at the 2022 MTV Europe Music Awards.

An extended version of the song, called the "Roman Remix", was surprise-released on August 18, 2022, whereby Minaj incorporates her alter ego Roman Zolanski for a third verse on the track. On September 9, 2022, a second remix titled "Queen Mix" was released featuring multiple female rappers including JT of City Girls, BIA, Katie Got Bandz, Akbar V, and Maliibu Miitch. All versions of the song were included on various reissues of Minaj's first greatest hits album Queen Radio: Volume 1 (2022).

== Background and release ==
The music publishing company Hipgnosis Songs Fund was looking for suitors in producers and artists teams to sample Rick James records as they owned percentages of the rights to his catalogue. They were particularly inspired in shopping ideas for "Super Freak" after being inspired by MC Hammer previously sampling the song on the 1990 hit record "U Can't Touch This". After receiving a lightly edited version of "Super Freak" by producer Malibu Babie, the instrumental was sent to Minaj and her team, which they then brought to a songwriting team that included Dr. Luke.

On July 13, 2022, Minaj previewed a song titled "Freaky Girl" on her social media. The official Twitter account of Rick James, whom the song samples, responded to the snippet, calling it a "banger." Minaj had asked fans to choose the song's official title, ultimately settling on "Super Freaky Girl", explaining that due to unspecified legal issues, she could not use either "Freaky Girl" or "Freak", the latter having won a fan-voted poll. On July 22, she announced that the song would be released on August 12.

On August 5, she revealed the cover art for the song, alongside a thirst trap. The song's snippet garnered popularity on TikTok and its release was noted for being highly anticipated. The song was premiered on Minaj's Amazon Amp Queen Radio show on August 11. Its release was accompanied by an eggplant and peach emoji-filled lyric video. "Super Freaky Girl" is the second time Minaj sampled "Super Freak", after using it on "Dilly Dally", a track from her 2007 mixtape Playtime Is Over.

The song marked Minaj's first solo single release since "Megatron" in 2019. The song was deemed as "a return to form" for Minaj after she said in February 2022 on The Dana Cortez Show that she felt uncomfortable releasing vulgar music while pregnant with her son, explaining that she was in different space at the time: "My label wanted me to go full out with a single and everything when I was pregnant, and I couldn't bring myself to put out a song about pussy and dicks and sucking and eating. I couldn't bring myself to put a record out like that while my son was growing in my body".

Billboard noted that Minaj was the only artist in 2022, out of all artists who took the Recording Academy’s Women in the Mix pledge, to work with a woman producer (Malibu Babie) on a song that appeared on the Billboard Hot 100 Year-End Chart.

== Composition ==
"Super Freaky Girl" was described as a “raunchy”, “sensual” song by various media outlets. The track features Minaj's alter ego Nick James, named after singer Rick James. The song sees Minaj describing her sexual encounters in a vivid manner, while "reiterating her status as a rap icon, as well as a symbol of sexual liberation". A bass-heavy song, it prominently samples Rick James's "Super Freak" (1981), particularly the riff, and opens with James's a capella vocals.

Minaj interpolates her 2013 remix of PTAF's "Boss Ass Bitch", while referencing, among others, Master P's 1998 single "Make 'Em Say Uhh!", former NFL player Colin Kaepernick's "take a knee" protests, and playing on the names of Barbadian singer Rihanna and American rapper ASAP Rocky, rapping "Get me Rocky ASAP, nigga, word to Rih". The song has been compared to Minaj's 2014 single "Anaconda".

== Critical reception ==
"Super Freaky Girl" was met with generally positive reviews from critics. Shaad D'Souza of Paper called the song "a bouncy, bawdy return to pop-rap. Zany and addictive, you can think of it as 'Anaconda 2'". David Renshaw of The Fader praised Minaj for bringing "her A-game to the song, spitting x-rated bars and confident boosting mottos ('I got a princess face, a killer body, samurai mind'), making it a natural sister track to her own 'Anaconda'". Complex's Jessica McKinney listed the song among the best releases of the week, saying on "Freaky Girl", Minaj is "confident, sexy, and alluring, leaving us wanting more", while calling her "flow irresistible on the song, as she takes pride in her freaky nature and vividly describes her sexual encounters".

Claire Yotts of Our Generation Music said "The 39-year-old and mother of one is still killing the game as 'Super Freaky Girl' is a reminder to all why she is known as the Queen of Rap". Billboard's Mitchell Peters said Minaj "has a gleeful time reanimating the classic track's salacious funk with sexual innuendo and a flow that knows when to speed up and when to really land a punchline".

== Awards and nominations ==
Awards and nominations for "Super Freaky Girl"
Year	Organization	Award	Result
2022	Official Charts Company	Official Number 1 Award	Won
2022	ARIA Chart	Aria #1 Single award	Won
2022	MTV Europe Music Awards	Best Song	Won
2022	MTV Europe Music Awards	Best Video	Nominated
2022	MTV Video Music Awards	Song of Summer	Nominated
2022	NMPA Awards	Platinum Single	Won
2022	NRJ Music Award	Cover/Adaption of the Year	Nominated
2022	People's Choice Awards	The Song of 2022	Nominated
2022	UB Honors	Best Visual of the Year (tie)	Won
2022	UB Honors	Best Hip-Hop Single of the Year	Nominated
2023
2023	BET Awards 2023	Viewer's Choice	Nominated
2023	BMI R&B Hip-Hop Awards 2023	Most-Performed Song of the Year	Won
2023	iHeartRadio Music Awards	Favorite use of a sample	Nominated
2023	iHeartRadio Music Awards	Best Lyrics	Nominated
2023	iHeartRadio Music Awards	TikTok Bop of the Year	Nominated
2023	2023 SESAC Music Awards	SESAC Performance Award	Won
2023	MTV Video Music Awards	Best Hip-Hop	Won
2023	MTV Video Music Awards	Video of the Year	Nominated
2023	MTV Video Music Awards	Best Visual Effects	Nominated
2024	BMI Pop Awards 2024	Most-Performed Song of the Year	Won

=== Grammy Awards dispute ===
Upon voting consideration for the 65th Annual Grammy Awards, "Super Freaky Girl" had reportedly been placed in the pop categories instead of the rap categories, in the end not receiving any grammy nominations. On Instagram Live, Minaj expressed confusion and frustration with the category placement. Naming other song examples of category mismatches, she said that if "Super Freaky Girl" was not considered a rap song, Latto's "Big Energy", which has the same producer, would likewise not be suitable for the rap categories. On Twitter, Minaj expressed more information, citing how "U Can't Touch This" by MC Hammer, which also sampled "Super Freak", was nominated for the rap categories. Minaj argued that her song was moved to pop to have less competition in the rap categories for newer artists, and that there was a general issue with both genres not being "treated fairly".

== Commercial performance ==
=== Worldwide ===
On the Billboard Global 200, the song debuted at number five, simultaneously earning Minaj her second top ten entry on the chart as well as her highest-charting single there, surpassing the number seven peak of "Do We Have a Problem?".

=== North America ===
In the United States, "Super Freaky Girl" debuted at the top of the Billboard Hot 100 for the chart dated August 27, 2022, making it Minaj's third number one song on the chart and her first unaccompanied by another featured artist. She became the first Black female artist to debut at the top of the chart with a solo song since Fantasia's "I Believe" in 2004 and the fifth Black female artist to ever do so. Minaj became the first solo female rapper to debut at the summit of the Hot 100 since Lauryn Hill's "Doo Wop (That Thing)" in 1998 and first female rapper to debut a solo song at number one in the 21st century. "Super Freaky Girl" extended Minaj's record as the female rapper with the most top 10 entries on the Hot 100 with 21 and the female rapper with the most entries on the chart with 124. She became the first female artist to debut atop the chart without an accompanying music video since Ariana Grande's "Thank U, Next" in 2018. It became the first time in the 21st century that four black female artists reached number one on the Hot 100 consecutively, following Tems on Future's "Wait for U" (also featuring Drake), Lizzo's "About Damn Time", Beyoncé's "Break My Soul", and Minaj's own "Super Freaky Girl". The debut of "Super Freaky Girl" resulted in Minaj re-entering Billboard's Artist 100 chart at number three for the issue ending August 27, 2022, becoming the highest charting female artist that week.

The song debuted atop both Billboard's Digital Songs Sales and Streaming Songs charts, powered by strong sales figures of 89,000 digital downloads sold, as well as a total of 21.1 million US streams garnered within its first week of availability from August 12 to 18. With 89,000 downloads sold, "Super Freaky Girl" marked the largest digital sales week for any song in 2022, surpassing Minaj's own "Do We Have a Problem?" with Lil Baby. It became her twelfth and second leader on both of the aforementioned charts, respectively. The song missed entering Billboard's Radio Songs chart in its first week, drawing 4.6 million all-format radio audience impressions in the week ending August 21 due to early airplay. "Super Freaky Girl" entered at the summit of both the Hot R&B/Hip-Hop Songs and Hot Rap Songs, at number one, becoming her eighth leader on both charts, respectively.

In its second week, "Super Freaky Girl" remained within the Billboard Hot 100's top ten, placing at number seven. The song sold another 15,000 digital downloads, spending a second consecutive week atop the Digital Songs Sales chart, while slipping 1–3 on the Streaming Songs chart with an additional 18.1 million US streams, down 14 percent from its first week. Despite this, "Super Freaky Girl" marked Minaj's first multi-week chart topper on the Digital Songs of her career. The track drew in 9.2 million radio audience impressions, a 105% increase from the previous week, causing it to jump to number 27 on Billboard's Mainstream Top 40 chart following its number 34 debut. The song has spent eleven weeks atop the Hot Rap Songs chart, and peaked at numbers one and three on the Rhythmic Songs and Mainstream Top 40 airplay charts respectively, becoming her tenth top ten hit at the former and her first since 2016. The song has sold over 2 million units in the United States as of August 2023.

In Canada, "Super Freaky Girl" arrived at number eight on the Canadian Hot 100 chart, earning the title as the highest new entry of the week. It gave Minaj her nineteenth top ten single in the nation, while debuting atop the Canadian Digital Songs chart, earning Minaj her fifth sales chart topper and twenty-fourth top ten entry there.

=== Europe and Oceania ===
Across Europe the song achieved commercial success. In Ireland, "Super Freaky Girl" debuted at number 14 on the Irish Singles Chart weekly issue ending August 25, 2022, before ascending to number nine in its second week. It later peaked at number six in its fifth week. Similarly, it charted at number 15 in its opening week on the United Kingdom singles chart. It ascended to number ten on the week ending September 1, 2022, before slipping one position to number 11 in its third week. In its fifth week, the track reached a new peak of number five, becoming Minaj's highest-charting entry as lead artist since "Anaconda" reached number three in 2014, as well as highest overall peak since "Boyz" peaked at number four in October 2021. The song charted at number four on the UK R&B Chart in its first week, where it has reached a peak of number one on the chart issue dated September 9, 2022.

In Australia, "Super Freaky Girl" debuted at number four on the ARIA Singles Chart for the week dated August 22, 2022, becoming her first song to enter the top 10 as a lead artist since her 2014 single, "Bed of Lies". The song ascended to number one in its fourth week on the chart, becoming Minaj's first number-one song and the first solo female rap song to go number one in the country. In New Zealand, the track debuted at number five on the New Zealand Singles Chart, ascending to the top spot in its second week, becoming her first number-one hit in the nation. It has stayed atop the chart for five consecutive weeks.

== Music video ==
On August 18, 2022, Minaj previewed the official music video and on September 1, she officially released it, with Alexander Ludwig, starring as the Barbie character, Ken. It features Minaj as a housewife in a setting similar to Wisteria Lane, as she unleashes her "freaky" secrets, donning long pink hair, sitting on top of the kitchen counter, wielding a knife over her lover. She also opens a drawer filled with freaky accessories. The video also features her dressed as famous singer Rick James, sporting glasses and a guitar.

== Remixes ==
On August 18, 2022, Minaj released an extended version of "Super Freaky Girl", dubbed the "Roman Remix", featuring her alter ego Roman Zolanski. This marked a return of the alter ego. The song is a minute longer than the original, and has a restructured end, adding a third verse. HotNewHipHop's Aron A. called it a "double-timed fiery" verse, while Regina Cho of Revolt and Uproxx's Aaron Williams likewise both said Minaj delivers a "rapid-fire verse". Noting the boasts about her career's longevity, Williams said "It's an especially timely assertion, considering she's soon to be honored with a Video Vanguard Award at the upcoming 2022 VMAs". Minaj also mentions how an old mixtape of hers sold more than someone's album, likely a reference to her 2021 re-release of her 2009 mixtape Beam Me Up Scotty, which debuted at number two on the Billboard 200. She also shouts out label-mates Lil Wayne and Drake.

On September 9, 2022, Minaj released a second remix dubbed the "Queen Mix", featuring American female rappers JT from City Girls, Bia, Katie Got Bandz, Akbar V, and Maliibu Miitch. The remix was performed by all artists at Minaj's April 10 show of the Pink Friday 2 World Tour in Boston, MA.

== Charts ==
=== Weekly charts ===
Weekly chart performance
Chart (2022–2023)	Peak position
Australia (ARIA)	1
Australia Hip Hop/R&B (ARIA)	1
Austria (Ö3 Austria Top 40)	39
Bolivia (Monitor Latino)	16
Canada Hot 100 (Billboard)	8
Canada CHR/Top 40 (Billboard)	28
Canada Hot AC (Billboard)	46
Central America Anglo (Monitor Latino)	1
CIS Airplay (TopHit)	139
Czech Republic Singles Digital (ČNS IFPI)	63
Denmark (Tracklisten)	36
El Salvador (Monitor Latino)	16
Finland Airplay (Radiosoittolista)	32
Germany (GfK)	33
Global 200 (Billboard)	5
Greece International (IFPI)	18
Hungary (Single Top 40)	4
Iceland (Tónlistinn)	7
Ireland (IRMA)	6
Israel (Media Forest)	19
Japan Hot Overseas (Billboard Japan)	12
Lebanon (Lebanese Top 20)	9
Lithuania (AGATA)	37
Malaysia International (RIM)	17
Netherlands (Dutch Top 40)	35
Netherlands (Single Top 100)	40
New Zealand (Recorded Music NZ)	1
Nigeria (TurnTable Top 100)	94
Philippines (Billboard)	10
Portugal (AFP)	66
Singapore (RIAS)	18
Slovakia (Singles Digitál Top 100)	40
South Africa Streaming (TOSAC)	4
Sweden (Sverigetopplistan)	28
Switzerland (Schweizer Hitparade)	42
UK Singles (Official Charts)	5
UK Hip Hop/R&B (Official Charts)	1
US Billboard Hot 100	1
US Adult Pop Airplay (Billboard)	31
US Dance Airplay (Billboard)	7
US Hot R&B/Hip-Hop Songs (Billboard)	1
US Pop Airplay (Billboard)	3
US R&B/Hip-Hop Airplay (Billboard)	15
US Rhythmic Airplay (Billboard)	1
Venezuela (Record Report)	52
Vietnam (Vietnam Hot 100)	53

=== Year-end charts ===
Year-end chart performance
Chart (2022)	Position
Australia (ARIA)	45
Canada (Canadian Hot 100)	60
Global 200 (Billboard)	126
Latvia (EHR)	44
UK Singles (OCC)	93
US Billboard Hot 100	56
US Hot R&B/Hip-Hop Songs (Billboard)	15
US Rhythmic (Billboard)	22

Year-end chart performance
Chart (2023)	Position
US Billboard Hot 100	79
US Hot R&B/Hip-Hop Songs (Billboard)	26
US Mainstream Top 40 (Billboard)	18
US Rhythmic (Billboard)	37

== Certifications ==
Certifications and sales for “Super Freaky Girl”
Region	Certification	Certified units/sales
Australia (ARIA)	4× Platinum	280,000^{‡}
Denmark (IFPI Danmark)	Gold	45,000^{‡}
Italy (FIMI)	Gold	50,000^{‡}
New Zealand (RMNZ)	2× Platinum	60,000^{‡}
Poland (ZPAV)	Platinum	50,000^{‡}
United Kingdom (BPI)	Platinum	600,000^{‡}
United States (RIAA)	2× Platinum	2,000,000^{‡}
^{‡} Sales+streaming figures based on certification alone.

== Release history ==
Release history and formats for "Super Freaky Girl"
Country	Date	Format	Version	Labels	Ref.
Various	August 12, 2022	Digital download; streaming	Original	Young Money; Republic	
United States	August 16, 2022	Contemporary hit radio; rhythmic contemporary radio	Original	Young Money; Cash Money; Republic	
Various	August 18, 2022	Digital download; streaming	Roman Remix	Republic	
Various	September 9, 2022	Digital download; streaming	Queen Mix	Republic	
