= Red Ruby da Sleeze =

2023 single by Nicki Minaj

Single by Nicki Minaj

from the album Pink Friday 2
- Released: March 3, 2023
- Recorded: 2022
- Genre: Hip hop; trap
- Length: 3:35
- Label: Republic
- Songwriters: Onika Maraj; Go Grizzly; Cheeze Beatz; Tate Kobang; Lumidee Cedeño; Kirsten Allyssa Spencer; Teddy Mendez; Steven Marsden; Josiah Nasir Muhammad; Irvin Winslow; Edwin Perez
- Producers: Go Grizzly; Cheeze Beatz; Kobang

Nicki Minaj singles chronology
"Tukoh Taka" (2023)	"Red Ruby da Sleeze" (2023)	"WTF" (2023)

Music video
- "Red Ruby da Sleeze" on YouTube

"Red Ruby da Sleeze", often stylized "Red Ruby Da Sleeze", is a song by rapper Nicki Minaj from her fifth studio album, Pink Friday 2 (2023). Initially released on March 3, 2023 as a promotional single, it was officially released on March 14, 2023 to US rhythmic contemporary radio through Republic Records, serving as the album's second single. It contains a sample of "Never Leave You (Uh Oooh, Uh Oooh)" (2003) by Lumidee and was produced by Go Grizzly, Cheeze Beatz, and Tate Kobang. The song debuted in the top 15 in the United States.

== Background and composition ==
Nicki Minaj first previewed the track on February 23, 2023, on Instagram, also announcing in a post that it would be released on March 3, 2023. She teased the song with a video of her rapping to it at the Trinidad and Tobago Carnival. Minaj referred to the track as a "street record b4 [sic] my next official single."

Over a beat of "near-Flamenco handclaps" and trap drums, the song finds Nicki Minaj rapping and singing. The chorus functions as a percussive breakdown, featuring faint vocals of "Uh oooooh's" from the sample of Lumidee's "Never Leave You (Uh Oooh, Uh Oooh)" in the background.

Minaj performs in her new titular alter-ego, Red Ruby or Red Ruby Da Sleeze. Media speculated that Minaj dissed Megan Thee Stallion with the lyric "700 on 'em horses when we fixin' to leave / But I don't fuck with horses since Christopher Reeves", which references actor Christopher Reeve's falling off a horse accident that left him paralyzed. It was also speculated that the lyrics "Dorito bitches mad that they not chose" and "Ya fuckin' bozo / That .40 cal a make 'em dance like a go-go" addressed Megan, the former alluding to Megan's promotional song "Flamin' Hottie" for a Hot Cheetos and Doritos Super Bowl commercial, and the latter alluding to the claim that rapper Tory Lanez allegedly yelled "Dance bitch, dance!" when shooting at Megan. Minaj also references fashion designer Donna Karan with the lyric "We don't be Karen like Donna-na, na-na-na-na".

== Reception ==
Tom Breihan of Stereogum wrote, "[Minaj] can really rap, and she can really, really rap when she's mad about something. She goes off on this thing, moving in and out of patois, and the beat is hard and pop at the same time." Jon Pareles of The New York Times commented, "Calm arrogance is Nicki Minaj's gift. There's no need to decipher all her allusions because her delivery and production say it all" and "her percussive rhymes are competitive in every realm — linguistic, sexual, financial, culinary ('guacamole with the taco') — and their utter confidence is still convincing."

== Music video ==
An official music video was teased on March 15, 2023, and released on May 13. Directed by Grizz and filmed in Trinidad and Tobago and California, it sees Minaj on the deck and in the backyard of her Hidden Hills mansion. She is shown in different outfits, such as a black monokini, a red Dior bikini, and a red kimono which she wears over a swimsuit and later takes off, as well as various clothing of high fashion brands. Reality star Brooke Bailey from Basketball Wives appears alongside Minaj in multiple scenes, such as sitting under a cabana, walking down the city streets and shopping for fashion, and posing in front of a white Range Rover, while also wearing luxury clothing. Additionally, Minaj is seen going on joyrides at night with Jamaican dancehall artist Skeng, and in a pink Rolls-Royce with red interior. Her collaboration with Bailey and outfits in the clip were teased in Instagram posts prior to the release of the video.

== Track listings ==
- Streaming/digital download
1. "Red Ruby da Sleeze" – 3:34
- Digital download – acapella
1. "Red Ruby da Sleeze" (acapella) – 3:34
- Streaming/digital download – sped up
1. "Red Ruby da Sleeze" (sped up) – 2:59
2. "Red Ruby da Sleeze" – 3:34

== Charts ==
=== Weekly charts ===
Weekly chart performance
Chart (2023)	Peak position
Canada Hot 100 (Billboard)	46
Global 200 (Billboard)	20
Ireland (IRMA)	28
New Zealand Hot Singles (RMNZ)	5
South Africa (Billboard)	18
UK Singles (Official Charts)	28
UK Hip Hop/R&B (Official Charts)	18
US Billboard Hot 100	13
US Hot R&B/Hip-Hop Songs (Billboard)	4
US R&B/Hip-Hop Airplay (Billboard)	23
US Pop Airplay (Billboard)	40
US Rhythmic Airplay (Billboard)	5

=== Year-end charts ===
Year-end chart performance
Chart (2023)	Position
US Digital Song Sales (Billboard)	38
US Hot R&B/Hip-Hop Songs (Billboard)	49
US Rhythmic (Billboard)	25

== Certifications ==
Certifications for "Red Ruby da Sleeze"
Region	Certification	Certified units/sales
Australia (ARIA)	Gold	35,000^{‡}
United Kingdom (BPI)	Silver	200,000^{‡}
United States (RIAA)	Platinum	1,000,000^{‡}
^{‡} Sales+streaming figures based on certification alone.

== Release history ==
Release history and formats for "Red Ruby da Sleeze"
Country	Date	Format	Version	Labels	Ref.
Various	March 3, 2023	Digital download; streaming	Original	Republic	
Various	March 7, 2023	Digital download	Acapella	Republic	
United States	March 14, 2023	Rhythmic contemporary radio	Original	Republic	
Various	March 30, 2023	Digital download; streaming	Sped up	Republic	
