= Last Time I Saw You =

Single by Nicki Minaj

from the album Pink Friday 2
- Released: September 1, 2023
- Recorded: 2023
- Genre: Pop; R&B; Pop-Rap
- Length: 3:36
- Label: Republic
- Songwriter: Onika Maraj
- Producers: ATL Jacob; TooDope!; Hendrix Smoke; Bak; Frankie Bash

Nicki Minaj singles chronology
"Endless Fashion" (2023)	"Last Time I Saw You" (2023)	"Everybody" (2024)

Audio video
- "Last Time I Saw You" on YouTube

"Last Time I Saw You" is a song by rapper Nicki Minaj from her fifth studio album Pink Friday 2 (2023). It was released on September 1, 2023, through Republic Records as the third single from the album.

== Background and composition ==
On June 29, 2023, Minaj announced the sequel to her debut studio album Pink Friday and began teasing the release of the album in the following weeks. On August 14, the rapper shared a short snippet of a "vulnerable" track on an Instagram livestream. The snippet was described as "emotionally charged" with lyrics "about a loved one from the distant past". When asked for the title of the song, Minaj replied that it was called "Last Time That I Saw You".

On August 25, Minaj shared the pre-save link of the song, where it was confirmed that the single name was "Last Time I Saw You". At the same time, she posted the single artwork. The song was produced by Hendrix Smoke and ATL Jacob. The cover depicts Minaj wearing a "glistening" dress, in front of a pink backdrop with her hands raised. Minaj further teased the release by posting more promotional images and video clips of the photoshoot. On August 28, via Instagram Live, she confirmed that the single would be released on September 1.

Minaj confirmed in an interview with Zane Lowe that the song's lyrics explore her emotions surrounding the loss of her father shortly following the birth of her son, as well as an exploration of loss more generally in other types of relationships. "The last thing I thought I was going to have to do when I just gave birth to my first child was to start preparing for my father’s funeral," she commented.

The song was musically classified as pop and R&B.

== Critical reception ==
Trent Fitzgerald of XXL wrote that the song is "heavily more pop than her previous singles". Alex Gonzalez of Uproxx also pointed out that the rapper "taps into her vocals, delivering a pop and R&B-influenced hit with a painfully relatable message". In her review for Consequence, Jo Vito described the song as "dreamy" and "melancholic" capturing "a feeling of loss, it also offers a message of hope". The writer also wrote that "Minaj’s vocals carry the melodies and really hit home the reflective vibe, with the perfect amount of ethereal delay effects to boot".

Tom Breihan of Stereogum wrote that the production sounds "lush and layered" and that it was a "shimmering pop song with a whole lot of singing" where Minaj "never gets too specific, and she barely raps on the track" talking about "regretting losing touch with someone". Kyann-Sian Williams of NME defined the song "emotional". Raphael Helfand of The Fader wrote that Minaj "expands on the sentiment in a familiar, slightly Seussian flow" showing her "emotional spectrum".

== Live performances ==
On September 12, 2023, Minaj performed "Last Time I Saw You" for the first time at the 2023 MTV Video Music Awards, as well as a then-unreleased track from Pink Friday 2 entitled "Big Difference". The performance featured Minaj standing mostly stationary and singing onstage in a bulbous black coat, awash in a magenta neon light background. Rolling Stone's Larisha Paul praised the "stunning vocal performance in a rare reminder that she can sing nearly as well as she can rap". On the other hand, Pitchfork's Madison Bloom criticized the "dull performance" for lacking Minaj's "beloved eccentricity".

== Track listings ==
- Streaming/digital download
1. "Last Time I Saw You" – 3:36
- Streaming/digital download – sped up
1. "Last Time I Saw You" (sped up) – 3:00
2. "Last Time I Saw You" – 3:36

== Charts ==
Chart performance for "Last Time I Saw You"
Chart (2023–2024)	Peak position
Australia Hip Hop/R&B (ARIA)	33
Canada Hot 100 (Billboard)	48
Canada CHR/Top 40 (Billboard)	35
Global 200 (Billboard)	36
Ireland (IRMA)	67
Japan Hot Overseas (Billboard Japan)	14
New Zealand Hot Singles (RMNZ)	3
South Korea BGM (Circle)	149
UK Singles (Official Charts)	46
US Billboard Hot 100	23
US Hot R&B/Hip-Hop Songs (Billboard)	6
US Pop Airplay (Billboard)	23
US Rhythmic Airplay (Billboard)	16

== Release history ==
Release history and formats for "Last Time I Saw You"
Country	Date	Format	Version	Labels	Ref.
Various	September 1, 2023	Digital download; streaming	Original	Young Money; Republic	
United States	September 5, 2023	Contemporary hit radio; rhythmic contemporary radio	Original	Republic	
Various	September 7, 2023	Digital download; streaming	Sped up	Young Money; Republic	
