= FTCU =

2023 song by Nicki Minaj

Single by Nicki Minaj

from the album Pink Friday 2
- Released: January 10, 2024
- Recorded: 2023
- Genre: Trap
- Length: 2:52; 2:32 (STPU edition)
- Label: Republic
- Songwriters: Onika Maraj; Juaquin Malphurs; Joshua Luellen; Jacob Canady
- Producer: ATL Jacob

Nicki Minaj singles chronology
"Everybody" (2024)	"FTCU" (2024)	"Big Foot" (2024)

Audio video
- "FTCU" on YouTube

"FTCU" (abbreviated as "Fuck the Club Up") is a song by rapper Nicki Minaj from her fifth studio album Pink Friday 2 (2023). The song impacted rhythmic radio as the album's fifth and final single on January 30, 2024, through Republic Records. Produced by ATL Jacob, it contains a sample of "Fuck the Club Up" by Waka Flocka Flame featuring Pastor Troy and Slim Dunkin. A remix entitled the "Sleezemix" featuring Travis Scott, Chris Brown and Sexyy Red was released on April 19, 2024.

== Background and composition ==
The song samples lyrics from Waka Flocka Flame's "Fuck the Club Up" and contains trap production. It finds Minaj asserting her dominance in the hip hop music industry. The media speculated that the lyric "Stay in your Tory lane, bitch, I'm not Iggy" addresses rapper Megan Thee Stallion, as it reportedly references rappers Tory Lanez and Iggy Azalea: Lanez was convicted of shooting Megan Thee Stallion in 2020 and Azalea wrote a letter in support of him to the court.

== Critical reception ==
Robin Murray of Clash called the song a "foul-mouthed club salute". Nick Malone of PopMatters described the bass in the song as a "pimp smack to the jaw". Fred Thomas of AllMusic regarded the song to be one of the "concise burners" from Pink Friday 2. Julianne Escobedo Shepherd of Pitchfork commented that Minaj "seems to feel like she has to keep reiterating her position and punching down, hitting a low point on the Waka Flocka-sampling 'FTCU' when she raps, 'Stay in your Tory lane, bitch, I'm not Iggy.'"

== Promotion ==
Minaj appeared on The Late Show with Stephen Colbert on December 20, 2023, and performed a freestyle over the beat of FTCU, "battling" Colbert. A remix of the song entitled "Sleezemix" featuring rappers Travis Scott, Sexyy Red and singer Chris Brown was released on April 19, 2024.

== Accolades ==
Awards and nominations for "FTCU"
Organization	Year	Category	Result	Ref.
BET Hip Hop Awards	2024	Song of the Year	Nominated	

== Track listing ==
- Streaming/digital download
1. "FTCU" (explicit) – 2:52
2. "FTCU" (clean) – 2:52
3. "FTCU" (STPU edition) – 2:32
4. "FTCU" (STPU edition; clean radio version) – 2:32
5. "FTCU" (instrumental) – 2:32
- Streaming/digital download – Sleezemix
1. "FTCU" (Sleezemix; featuring Travis Scott, Chris Brown, and Sexyy Red) – 3:59
2. "FTCU" – 2:52

== Charts ==
=== Weekly charts ===
Weekly chart performance for "FTCU"
Chart (2023–2024)	Peak position
Australia (ARIA)	58
Australia Hip Hop/R&B (ARIA)	10
Canada Hot 100 (Billboard)	23
Global 200 (Billboard)	31
Greece International (IFPI)	41
Ireland (IRMA)	44
New Zealand (Recorded Music NZ)	23
UK Singles (Official Charts)	40
UK Hip Hop/R&B (Official Charts)	14
US Billboard Hot 100	15
US Hot R&B/Hip-Hop Songs (Billboard)	6
US Rhythmic Airplay (Billboard)	1

=== Year-end charts ===
2024 year-end chart performance for "FTCU"
Chart (2024)	Position
US Billboard Hot 100	88
US Hot R&B/Hip-Hop Songs (Billboard)	26
US Rhythmic (Billboard)	25

== Certifications ==
Certifications for "FTCU"
Region	Certification	Certified units/sales
New Zealand (RMNZ)	Gold	15,000^{‡}
United States (RIAA)	Platinum	1,000,000^{‡}
^{‡} Sales+streaming figures based on certification alone.

== Release history ==
Release dates and formats for "FTCU"
Region	Date	Format	Version	Label	Ref.
Various	January 10, 2024	Digital download; streaming	Original	Young Money; Republic	
United States	January 30, 2024	Rhythmic contemporary radio	Original	Young Money; Republic	
Various	April 19, 2024	Digital download; streaming	Sleezemix	Young Money; Republic	
