= Needle (song) =

2023 song by Nicki Minaj featuring Drake

Song by Nicki Minaj featuring Drake

from the album Pink Friday 2
- Released: December 8, 2023
- Recorded: 2022
- Genre: R&B; tropical house
- Length: 3:55
- Label: Republic
- Songwriters: Onika Maraj; Aubrey Graham; Matthew Samuels; Johann Deterville; Rahiem Hurlock
- Producers: Boi-1da; YogiTheProducer

"Needle" is a song by rapper Nicki Minaj featuring rapper Drake from the former's fifth studio album Pink Friday 2 (2023). It was produced by Boi-1da and YogiTheProducer.

== Background and musical style ==
During a guest appearance on Kai Cenat's Twitch stream, Minaj said the song was originally intended for Drake's album For All the Dogs but it did not fit the sonic vibe so Drake gave it her.

"Needle" opens with a sampled voicemail from singer SZA. Musically, the song is inspired by dancehall and Afrobeats, and has also been described as "tropical house bop" and "bumpy, island-tinged R&B". Through sing-rapping vocals, Drake performs the first verse and chorus, in which he sings: "Pull up the Maybach and bend your leg back / Let's engage that, don't delay that / You're like a needle, life's a haystack / Friends they can leave us, you could stay back". The track also makes lyrical reference to Icelandic singer-songwriter Björk.

== Critical reception ==
Alexander Cole of HotNewHipHop wrote, "This song has some nice wavy production, with Drake kicking off the song with some song vocals. Nicki Minaj matches this energy and provides some solid vocals of her own. The chemistry between these two artists is still there, and you can't help but love hearing them together again." With respect to Minaj's performance, Julianne Escobedo Shepherd of Pitchfork commented that "Flashes of her notorious humor emerge" in the song. Jon Caramanica of The New York Times regarded the artists' collaboration as "surprisingly listless". Nick Malone of PopMatters described the song as "an obvious leftover from Drake's For All the Dogs, defined by his signature anesthetized mumble-singing and an uninspired Nicki verse that cries out for the lightweight fun of 'Only' or 'Truffle Butter'."

== Charts ==
Chart performance for "Needle"
Chart (2023–2024)	Peak position
Canada Hot 100 (Billboard)	32
Global 200 (Billboard)	43
New Zealand Hot Singles (RMNZ)	6
Nigeria (TurnTable Top 100)	67
Sweden Heatseeker (Sverigetopplistan)	1
UK Singles (OCC)	58
UK Hip Hop/R&B (OCC)	11
US Billboard Hot 100	34
US Hot R&B/Hip-Hop Songs (Billboard)	7
US Rhythmic Airplay (Billboard)	35
