= Katie Got Bandz =

American rapper

- Katie in 2016

Background information
- Born: Kiara Johnson; July 22, 1993 (age 33); Chicago, Illinois, U.S.
- Genres: Hip hop, drill
- Occupation: Rapper
- Years active: 2011–present
- Label: EGL Entertainment

Kiara Johnson, also known by her stage name Katie Got Bandz (born July 22, 1993), is an American rapper from Chicago, Illinois, most recognized for her song "Pop Out" featuring King L.

== Early life ==
Katie is from Bronzeville, a neighborhood in the Low End area of South Side, Chicago. Katie cites her neighborhood as the muse for her lyrics and the stories she tells while rapping. Her favorite rappers were Waka Flocka Flame, Nicki Minaj, Drake, and Lil Wayne. Prior to rapping, she studied biology and pre-med at Truman College.

== Musical career ==
Katie is the debut female rapper of Chicago's drill music scene, though she has announced plans to transition her music to a more global sound. In several interviews she spoke of the poor reputation Chicago has with respect to crime and violence and the attack of drill music as a result. Katie has said that her intention with drill music is to portray her authentic experience and emphasizes she does not want to influence crime or contribute to the already high crime rate in Chicago through her music.

Her project Drillary Clinton 3 was released on December 23, 2015, and she intended to transition her sound with this project while paying homage to drill music at the same time. After a three-year hiatus, she returned with the single "Work It Girl", released on May 10, 2018. She stated that she felt "refreshed" and was ready to let her fans "discover a different side" of her. She released her first mixtape in four years, Rebirth, in July 2019. In 2022, she had a verse on Nicki Minaj's 'Super Freaky Girl: Queen Mix', which was highly popular and sampled from Rick James' 'Super Freak.'

== Discography ==
=== Mixtapes ===
- 2012: Bandz and Hittaz
- 2013: Drillary Clinton
- 2014: Drillary Clinton 2
- 2014: Coolin in Chiraq
- 2015: Zero to 39th
- 2015: Drillary Clinton 3
- 2019: Rebirth
- 2022: Drillary Clinton 4
