= The Pinkprint Tour =

2015–2016 concert tour by Nicki Minaj

- Tour by Nicki Minaj
- Location: North America • Europe • Asia • Africa
- Associated album: The Pinkprint
- Start date: March 16, 2015
- End date: March 25, 2016
- Legs: 6
- No. of shows: 26 in Europe; 23 in North America; 5 in Africa; 1 in Asia; 55 in total
- Box office: $22 million ($29.88 million in 2025 dollars) (38 dates)

Nicki Minaj concert chronology
- Pink Friday: Reloaded Tour (2012); The Pinkprint Tour (2015–2016); The Nicki Wrld Tour (2019)

The Pinkprint Tour was the third concert tour by the American rapper Nicki Minaj, in support of her third album, The Pinkprint (2014). The tour began on March 16, 2015, in Stockholm, Sweden and concluded on March 25, 2016, in Dubai, United Arab Emirates, finishing with a total of 55 shows in four continents.

The first European leg of the tour was supported by Trey Songz and Ester Dean and received mixed to positive reviews from critics, while the second North American leg was supported by Meek Mill, Rae Sremmurd, Tinashe, and Dej Loaf. The Pinkprint Tour grossed over $22 million from 38 shows.

== Background ==
In August 2014, when promoting "Anaconda", Minaj confirmed plans of a tour in support of The Pinkprint in an interview with Carson Daly on AMP Radio. When speaking of the tour, Minaj said, "We’re actually going to start the tour at the top of 2015, we’re going to start a European run and then we will back in America for a summer run." Additionally, the rapper hinted at a special guest joining her on tour by saying, "I can’t wait for them to find out who I’m going on tour with. I can’t say [who it is], but I know that my fans love this person. It's just going to make sense. I think our fan bases are very similar so I think its going to work out really good."

On December 8, 2014, three days after Minaj received two nominations for the 57th Grammy Awards and a week before the release of The Pinkprint, the tour was officially announced with seventeen dates scheduled across Europe in the spring of the following year. The announcement of the tour also revealed that R&B artist Trey Songz would be the special guest joining the rapper on the European leg of the tour to promote his latest studio album, Trigga (2014).

== Development ==
When speaking of the tour on the day of its announcement, Minaj said, "It's been way too long since I've seen my European Barbz. I can't wait to get back and party with all of you with Trey Songz. We have more than a few surprises in store, and I promise this will be my biggest and best tour yet!"

Pre-sale tickets and VIP packages for the tour were available to Minaj's fan club starting on December 10, 2014, followed by the general public sale beginning on December 12, 2014. Within hours of being on sale, the show at Zénith de Paris in Paris, France, on March 25, 2015, sold out, prompting Minaj to add another date in Paris on March 26, 2015, at the same venue. During a Q&A session with her fans on Twitter, Minaj began to reveal more details about the tour, which includes that the European leg of the tour will be extended, the North American leg will be announced in March, and that the tour will also visit Australia and Brazil.

About a month before the tour began, an altercation between Minaj's tour manager, De'Von Pickett, and a local citizen, Pierce Boykin, erupted at a local bar in Philadelphia. The argument resulted in the stabbing of Pickett and another crew member of the tour, ultimately killing Pickett and injuring the other crew member. In response to the tragedy, Minaj expressed her grief mainly through social media outlets such as Twitter and Instagram, but as time passed it was revealed that Minaj considered canceling the entire tour after the incident occurred. However, Minaj stated that canceling the tour wouldn't be the right thing to do. She elaborated by saying "I can’t let anything stop us from putting on the show because that would be quitting. So we’re going to continue the tour in his memory."

On March 16, 2015, the opening day of the tour, Minaj finally announced the North American tour dates along with its opening acts. The North American leg was initially announced with a total of nineteen dates between July and August 2015, however Minaj stated that additional dates will be added as the tour progresses. Tickets started to become available beginning on March 18, 2015, with the exclusive pre-sale to members of Minaj's fan club, which was followed by the general public sale starting on March 20, 2015. Opening acts for the North American leg include Hip-Hop artists Meek Mill and Rae Sremmurd, who will be promoting their latest studio efforts, Dreams Worth More Than Money (2015) and SremmLife (2014), and R&B artists Tinashe and Dej Loaf, who will be promoting their latest musical endeavors, Aquarius (2014) and Sell Sole (2014).

== Fashion ==
Throughout the tour, Minaj has incorporated multiple outfits into the show that correlate with the major themes of The Pinkprint. The show usually consists of four major outfits, each of which stylistically represent different segments of the show. For the first section of the show, Minaj is dressed in black lingerie covered with a black polka dot mesh catsuit, and is supported by an all female group of dancers who are also dressed in solid black mesh catsuits. The second section of the show sees Minaj performing in a gold-dipped skirt with matching thigh-high boots, and a gold bra, while her dancers, now both male and female, are dressed in gold attire as well. The designers of the second segment outfit were later revealed to be The Blonds, who created the costume especially for Minaj to perform in while on tour. The third and fourth portions of the show have seen multiple changes in wardrobe throughout the extent of the tour. For the third segment, Minaj has either worn a frilly black dress or a solid pink dress depending on the date of the show. And for the fourth and final segment for the tour, Minaj's ensemble either consists of a jumpsuit that can be described as looking like "a broken pink disco ball" on the front with an all mesh back, or a frilly pink bra with a shiny tutu and pink lace tights. Marissa G. Muller from MTV described the latter of the two outfits as "50% Barbie, 50% Ballerina", while also adding that Minaj looked like "the prettiest ballerina Barbie of them all" alongside her female dancers who were almost identically dressed. Muller also noted that the outfit was reminiscent of Minaj's look around the time she released her debut album, Pink Friday (2010). Overall, Nadeska Alexis, also from MTV, greatly praised Minaj's wardrobe choice for the tour stating that the outfits were "sexy", "elegant", and "sweet".

== Critical response ==
=== Europe ===
The European leg of the tour received mixed to positive reviews throughout the duration of its run. In review of the show in London, England, Nick Levine from NME praised Minaj's overall performance throughout the night. Levine noted that the beginning of the show "seemed detached" and "uncomfortable" with the performances of "All Things Go" and "I Lied", but quickly smoothed out when Minaj was in "full flow, spitting out fierce rhymes on 'Moment 4 Life' and 'Beez in the Trap', slut-dropping to 'Anaconda' and chatting about 'scones and jam' in a ridiculous English accent." He went on to comment about Minaj's versatility by saying that "Minaj is a much better rapper than singer, but because she invests slowies 'Marilyn Monroe', and 'Save Me' with real emotion, a mid-set ballads section is surprisingly gripping." Levine also commended Minaj's personality stating "it's the 32-year-old's fiery attitude that really impresses." Levine criticized an "unnecessary audience participation segment", but greatly praised the final segment of the show comparing the atmosphere to a "New York basement sweatbox." Alice Vincent from The Daily Telegraph gave a differing review of the same show in London stating that "this [the show] was a 90-minute struggle of a set." In opposition to Levine, Vincent favored the beginning of the spectacle rather than the end stating "Her Minajesty was imperious for the first six songs, viciously spitting the quickfire rhymes of 'Only', purring through the languorous reflection of 'I Lied'." Vincent went on to criticize the huge gaps between segments and the finale of the show stating "Minaj mostly felt just out of reach – especially during an overbearing climax of EDM synths and beats, into which she virtually vanished." Overall, Vincent awarded the show three out of five stars stating "In The Pinkprint, Minaj bore her soul: she should have done more of it on stage."

Irish Independent writer Eamon Sweeney was particularly unsatisfied with the show in Dublin, Ireland stating "the production as a whole is flawed. It sorely lacks pace and punch." Sweeney continued to criticize various elements of the show such as audience interaction and the beginning of the show in which he said "lacked spark and pizazz." Sweeney did however commend Minaj's flow by saying "There [were] fleeting moments when she [was] on fire." Sweeney concluded that "Minaj is still an extremely talented performer, it's just a pity that at this Dublin stopover she isn't a brilliant one."

Minaj received four out of five stars from many reporters throughout the European leg of the tour, including Katie Fitzpatrick from the Manchester Evening News, Kirsty McHale from the Liverpool Echo, Lisa-Marie Ferla from the Herald Scotland, and Simon Duke from Chronicle Live. Fitzpatrick greatly applauded Minaj and the overall feel of the show stating "[Minaj's] rapping is on fire" and that "the costume changes are just as exciting as her rhymes." Fitzpatrick also praised the final portion of the show saying it was "irresistibly fun" and that Minaj "had us all leaving the arena still in full flight with joyous abandon." McHale also gave positive feedback of Minaj's performance, versatility, and nature of the tour saying "For all of the outrageous costume changes and dance moves (of which there were many), there were also moments of substance where she showcased her vocal talents, such as 'Save Me' and 'Marilyn Monroe'. And her rapping was flawless all night long." She extended her praise by saying "when you go to see Nicki Minaj, you go to be entertained, and that's exactly what we got." Ferla in particular praised the slower section of the show stating that "'Pills n Potions' featured a breathtaking vocal performance, while Pink Friday: Roman Reloaded's 'Marilyn Monroe' gave me [Ferla] chills." Duke also commended Minaj's versatility by stating "We all know she can rap with the best of them but she also has a rather useful set of pipes with their shining moment coming in the epic 'Marilyn Monroe' from Pink Friday: Roman Reloaded." Duke also highly praised the final quarter of the show and its uplifting feeling when he said "I don’t think I’ve witnessed a more inspired back to back than 'Va Va Voom', 'Pound the Alarm', 'Turn Me On' and 'Bang Bang' – the quartet of chart smashes got everyone in the party mood." He further proclaimed the show was a success and stated "The enthusiastic crowd were sent on their way home with a swagger in their step thanks to a thumping encore of 'Starships' which capped a stellar showing from their idol."

== Commercial performance ==
Shortly after the tickets for the North American leg of the tour went on sale, Forbes reported outstandingly positive ticket sales with high ticket prices on the secondary markets. Jesse Lawrence from the business magazine reported that the average ticket price accumulated to a total of $194 per ticket on the secondary market. Lawrence noted that the price of the tickets on the secondary market were 24.4% more expensive than the tickets on the secondary market for her previous tour, the Pink Friday Tour (2012). Lawrence also mentioned that the most expensive tickets of the tour are for the show on July 26, 2015, in Brooklyn, New York with a price of $380 per ticket, which is 94% above the tour's average ticket price. The second priciest show is on August 16, 2015, in Vancouver, British Columbia, Canada with an average price of $197 per ticket. The two cheapest shows of the North American leg are in Clarkston, Michigan and Burgettstown, Pennsylvania with prices of $109 and $116 per ticket, which are about 43.5% below the tour's average ticket price. Lawrence greatly commended Minaj on the huge increase of ticket prices on the secondary market from her previous tour to her current tour stating that the current tour "has raised the bar for the 32-year-old Queens native."

After the conclusion of the North American leg, Minaj topped Billboard's Hot Tours chart for the week of September 1, 2015. Minaj achieved the top position on the chart with a total gross of $13,010,440 and a total ticket count of 293,036 from seven arena shows and thirteen amphitheatre shows across North America. Highlights from the North American leg include the show in Brooklyn, New York, which produced the highest single-night gross of $1.3 million from 14,186 sold seats, and the show in Chicago which grabbed the largest audience of the tour with 22,700 fans present. Furthermore, the North American leg scored ten sold-out shows.

At the end of 2015, the tour placed at number 80 on Pollstar's "2015 Year-End Top 100 Worldwide Tours" list, grossing $22 million from 38 shows with a total attendance of 429,672. This total does not include the 12 music festivals where Minaj performed as part of the tour.

== Controversy ==
On December 19, 2015, the African leg of The Pinkprint Tour began at the Show Unitel Boas Festas Christmas festival in Luanda, Angola. Unitel, a company owned by the country's government, paid Minaj to perform at the festival as the headlining act, making her the event's only non-Angolan performer. Although the company was not owned by the Angolan state at the time of the performance, it was controlled by Isabel dos Santos, daughter of Angola's president at the time, José Eduardo dos Santos. The Angolan government has been criticized for violating the human rights of people who speak out against state oppression, with National Police Force often using excessive force. Upon announcing her performance at the festival, Thor Halvorssen of the Human Rights Foundation wrote a letter to Minaj stating that "If [she] move[s] forward with this performance for the dictator and his family, [she] will be in league with the people stealing educational resources and opportunity from young Angolans." Before the performance, Minaj took to Instagram, posting a photo with Isabel using the seemingly supportive caption "She's just the 8th richest woman in the world. (At least that's what I was told by someone b4 [sic] we took this photo) Lol. Yikes!!!!! GIRL POWER!!!!! This motivates me soooooooooo much!!!!"

== BET ==
It was announced that Nicki Minaj is going to release The Pinkprint Tour on BET TV and may be released on DVD. Some songs were cut off during the show. It aired on TV on December 31, 2016, on New Year's Eve.

=== Musicians ===
- Nicki Minaj - Main Performer, Vocals
- Omar Edwards - Musical Direction
- Adam Blackstone - Musical Direction
- Devine Evans - Music Programmer, Composer
- Marcus Kincy - Keyboards
- Dareck Cobbs - Keyboards, Music Programmer, Composer

=== Crew ===
- Show Director: Laurieann Gibson
- Production Designers: Jeremy Railton & Alex M. Calle
- Lighting Designer: Alex Reardon
- Lighting Director: Kathy Beer
- Programmer: Joe Cabrera
- Lighting Crew Chief: Jerry ”Hodgie” Vierna
- Lighting Techs: William Settle, Scott Naef, Jennifer Bass
- Show Director: Laurieann Gibson
- Video Co: PRG/Nocturne
- Video Director: Steve Fatone
- Production Manager: Victor Reed

== Set list ==
=== Europe ===
This set list is representative of the show on April 10, 2015 in Newcastle, England. It does not represent all dates throughout the European legs of the tour.

1. "All Things Go"
2. "I Lied"
3. "The Crying Game"
4. "Feeling Myself"
5. "Only"
6. "Truffle Butter"
7. "Moment 4 Life"
8. "Lookin Ass"
9. "Want Some More"
10. "Did It On'em"
11. "Beez in the Trap"
12. "Flawless"
13. "Dance (A$$)"
14. "Anaconda"
15. "Pills n Potions"
16. "Marilyn Monroe"
17. "Save Me"
18. "Grand Piano"
19. "Super Bass"
20. "Whip It"
21. "Trini Dem Girls"
22. "Va Va Voom"
23. "Pound the Alarm"
24. "Turn Me On"
25. "Bang Bang"
26. "The Night Is Still Young"
27. "Starships"

=== North America ===
This set list is representative of the show on July 26, 2015 in Brooklyn, New York. It does not represent all dates throughout the North American legs of the tour.

1. "All Things Go"
2. "I Lied"
3. "The Crying Game"
4. "Feeling Myself"
5. "Only"
6. "Truffle Butter"
7. "Moment 4 Life"
8. "Lookin Ass"
9. "Want Some More"
10. "Shanghai"
11. "Did It On'em"
12. "Beez in the Trap"
13. "Flawless"
14. "Dance (Ass)"
15. "Anaconda"
16. "Pills n Potions"
17. "Save Me"
18. "Grand Piano"
19. "Bang Bang"
20. "Super Bass"
21. "Hey Mama"
22. "Pound the Alarm"
23. "The Night Is Still Young"
24. "Monster"
25. "Itty Bitty Piggy"
26. "Chiraq"
27. "Roman's Revenge"
28. "Up All Night"
29. "Make Me Proud"
30. "Hold Yuh"
31. "Right Thru Me"
32. "BedRock"
33. "Throw Sum Mo"
34. "Big Daddy"
35. "Buy a Heart"
36. "Bad for You"
37. "All Eyes on You"
38. "Starships"

=== Notes ===
- During the second show in Paris, France, Meek Mill joined Minaj onstage to perform "Dreams and Nightmares" and "Ima Boss".
- During the first show in London, England, Jessie Ware joined Minaj onstage to perform "The Crying Game".
- The show in Las Vegas, Nevada was shortened to 30 minutes in length and was concluded with a performance of "Hey Mama", in which Minaj was assisted by David Guetta and Bebe Rexha.
- During the show in Austin, Texas, Meek Mill joined Minaj onstage to perform "Ima Boss". Minaj also performed "Trini Dem Girls" and "Va Va Voom".
- During the show in Los Angeles, Rae Sremmurd joined Minaj onstage to perform "No Flex Zone" in addition to "Throw Sum Mo".

== Shows ==
List of 2015 concerts
Date (2015)	City	Country	Venue	Opening acts	Attendance	Revenue
March 16	Stockholm	Sweden	Ericsson Globe	Trey Songz; Ester Dean	4,894 / 8,522 (57%)	$348,272
March 17	Oslo	Norway	Oslo Spektrum	Trey Songz; Ester Dean	5,888 / 8,550 (68%)	$384,237
March 19	Amsterdam	Netherlands	Ziggo Dome	Trey Songz; Ester Dean	10,497 / 15,600 (67%)	$574,435
March 20	Frankfurt	Germany	Festhalle Frankfurt	Trey Songz; Ester Dean	11,443 / 13,549 (84%)	$526,116
March 22	Brussels	Belgium	Palais 12	Trey Songz; Ester Dean	6,209 / 12,743 (48%)	$327,341
March 23	Oberhausen	Germany	König-Pilsener-Arena	Trey Songz; Ester Dean	6,727 / 11,093 (60%)	$337,303
March 25	Paris	France	Zénith Paris	Trey Songz; Ester Dean	—	—
March 26	Paris	France	Zénith Paris	Trey Songz; Ester Dean	—	—
March 28	London	England	The O_{2} Arena	Trey Songz; Ester Dean	17,199 / 17,199 (100%)	$1,295,650
March 31	Dublin	Ireland	3Arena	Trey Songz; Ester Dean	6,896 / 9,825 (70%)	$494,281
April 1	Belfast	Northern Ireland	Odyssey Arena	Trey Songz; Ester Dean	6,267 / 8,000 (78%)	$435,310
April 3	Birmingham	England	Barclaycard Arena	Trey Songz; Ester Dean	9,934 / 14,695 (67%)	$675,293
April 4	Manchester	England	Manchester Arena	Trey Songz; Ester Dean	9,914 / 10,765 (92%)	$645,497
April 6	Liverpool	England	Echo Arena	Trey Songz; Ester Dean	6,802 / 8,508 (79%)	$448,901
April 7	Nottingham	England	Capital FM Arena	Trey Songz; Ester Dean	5,109 / 6,763 (75%)	$336,704
April 9	Leeds	England	First Direct Arena	Trey Songz; Ester Dean	6,027 / 8,194 (73%)	$368,211
April 10	Newcastle	England	Metro Radio Arena	Trey Songz; Ester Dean	5,714 / 9,030 (63%)	$366,017
April 12	Glasgow	Scotland	SSE Hydro	Trey Songz; Ester Dean	8,483 / 8,640 (98%)	$548,449
May 30 (Note: The show on May 30, 2015, in Las Vegas, Nevada was a part of the 2015 iHeartRadio Summer Pool Party.)	Paradise (Note: Promoted as Las Vegas.)	United States	The Colosseum at Caesars Palace	—N/a	—N/a	—N/a
June 5	Austin	United States	Circuit of the Americas	—N/a	—N/a	—N/a
June 26 (Note: The show on June 26, 2015, in Los Angeles was a part of the 2015 BET Experience and included special guests Ne-Yo, Rae Sremmurd, and Tinashe.)	Los Angeles	United States	Staples Center	—N/a	—N/a	—N/a
July 3 (Note: The show on July 3, 2015, in Lahti, Finland was a part of the 2015 Summer Up Festival.)	Lahti	Finland	Mukkula	—N/a	—N/a	—N/a
July 4 (Note: The show on July 4, 2015, in Roskilde, Denmark was a part of the 2015 Roskilde Festival.)	Roskilde	Denmark	Animal Showgrounds	—N/a	—N/a	—N/a
July 5 (Note: The show on July 5, 2015, in London, England was a part of the 2015 Wireless Festival and was co-headlined with David Guetta.)	London	England	Finsbury Park	—N/a	—N/a	—N/a
July 7 (Note: The show on July 7, 2015, in Nîmes, France was a part of the 2015 Festival de Nîmes and included special guests Big Sean and Rae Sremmurd.)	Nîmes	France	Arena of Nîmes	—N/a	—N/a	—N/a
July 8 (Note: The show on July 8, 2015, in Milan, Italy was a part of the 2015 Estathé Market Sound Music Festival and included special guests G-Eazy and Rae Sremmurd.)	Milan	Italy	Estathé Market Sound	—N/a	—N/a	—N/a
July 10 (Note: The show on July 10, 2015, in Frauenfeld, Switzerland was a part of Openair Frauenfeld 2015.)	Frauenfeld	Switzerland	Grosse Allmend	—N/a	—N/a	—N/a
July 11 (Note: The show on July 11, 2015, in Liège, Belgium was a part of the 2015 Les Ardentes Festival.)	Liège	Belgium	Parc Reine Astrid	—N/a	—N/a	—N/a
July 12 (Note: The show on July 12, 2015, in Gräfenhainichen, Germany was a part of the 2015 Splash! Festival.)	Gräfenhainichen	Germany	Ferropolis	—N/a	—N/a	—N/a
July 17	Dallas	United States	Gexa Energy Pavilion	Meek Mill/ Rae Sremmurd/ Tinashe/ Dej Loaf	19,946 / 19,946 (100%)	$750,272
July 18	Houston	United States	Toyota Center	Meek Mill/ Rae Sremmurd/ Tinashe/ Dej Loaf	10,018 / 11,498 (87%)	$746,085
July 20	Miami	United States	Bayfront Park Amphitheater	Meek Mill/ Rae Sremmurd/ Tinashe/ Dej Loaf	9,100 / 9,100 (100%)	$380,436
July 22	Bristow	United States	Jiffy Lube Live	Meek Mill/ Rae Sremmurd/ Tinashe/ Dej Loaf	17,834 / 22,583 (78%)	$644,021
July 24	Holmdel	United States	PNC Bank Arts Center	Meek Mill/ Rae Sremmurd/ Tinashe/ Dej Loaf	16,818 / 16,818 (100%)	$754,035
July 26	New York City (Note: Promoted as Brooklyn.)	United States	Barclays Center	Meek Mill/ Rae Sremmurd/ Tinashe/ Dej Loaf	14,186 / 14,186 (100%)	$1,313,809
July 28	Toronto	Canada	Molson Canadian Amphitheatre	Meek Mill/ Rae Sremmurd/ Tinashe/ Dej Loaf	15,185 / 15,185 (100%)	$771,260
July 29	Montreal	Canada	Bell Centre	Meek Mill/ Rae Sremmurd/ Tinashe/ Dej Loaf	7,214 / 8,920 (80%)	$495,482
July 31	Clarkston	United States	DTE Energy Music Theatre	Meek Mill/ Rae Sremmurd/ Tinashe/ Dej Loaf	15,170 / 15,170 (100%)	$615,437
August 2	Atlanta	United States	Lakewood Amphitheater	Meek Mill/ Rae Sremmurd/ Tinashe/ Dej Loaf	18,917 / 18,917 (100%)	$784,294
August 4	Charlotte	United States	PNC Music Pavilion	Meek Mill/ Rae Sremmurd/ Tinashe/ Dej Loaf	15,720 / 18,747 (83%)	$486,170
August 6	Camden	United States	Susquehanna Bank Center	Meek Mill/ Rae Sremmurd/ Tinashe/ Dej Loaf	22,597 / 22,597 (100%)	$748,756
August 8	Burgettstown	United States	First Niagara Pavilion	Meek Mill/ Rae Sremmurd/ Tinashe/ Dej Loaf	19,670 / 22,939 (85%)	$537,595
August 9	Tinley Park	United States	Hollywood Casino Amphiteatre	Meek Mill/ Rae Sremmurd/ Tinashe/ Dej Loaf	22,700 / 28,630 (79%)	$732,677
August 1	Denver	United States	Pepsi Center	Meek Mill/ Rae Sremmurd/ Tinashe/ Dej Loaf	10,037 / 12,089 (83%)	$631,921
August 13	San Diego	United States	Sleep Train Amphitheatre	Meek Mill/ Rae Sremmurd/ Tinashe/ Dej Loaf	14,389 / 19,406 (74%)	$471,553
August 14	Concord	United States	Concord Pavilion	Meek Mill/ Rae Sremmurd/ Tinashe/ Dej Loaf	12,501 / 12,501 (100%)	$537,950
August 16	Vancouver	Canada	Rogers Arena	Meek Mill/ Rae Sremmurd/ Tinashe/ Dej Loaf	10,750 / 10,905 (98%)	$595,603
August 18	Calgary	Canada	Scotiabank Saddledome	Meek Mill/ Rae Sremmurd/ Tinashe/ Dej Loaf	8,718 / 10,020 (87%)	$499,762
August 19	Edmonton	Canada	Rexall Place	Meek Mill/ Rae Sremmurd/ Tinashe/ Dej Loaf	9,159 / 10,098 (90%)	$579,970
August 23 (Note: The show on August 23, 2015, in Wantagh, New York is a part of the 2015 Billboard Hot 100 Music Festival.)	Wantagh	United States	Nikon at Jones Beach Theater	—N/a	—N/a	—N/a
December 19 (Note: The show on December 19, 2015 in Luanda, Angola was a part of Show Unitel Boas Festas.)	Luanda	Angola	Estádio dos Coqueiros	—N/a	—N/a	—N/a

List of 2016 concerts
Date (2016)	City	Country	Venue	Opening acts	Attendance	Revenue
March 17	Johannesburg	South Africa	Ticketpro Dome	Cassper Nyovest	—	—
March 18	Johannesburg	South Africa	Ticketpro Dome	Cassper Nyovest	—	—
March 20	Durban	South Africa	Moses Mabhida Stadium	Cassper Nyovest	—	—
March 22	Cape Town	South Africa	GrandWest Grand Arena	Cassper Nyovest	—	—
March 25	Dubai	United Arab Emirates	Autism Rocks Arena	—N/a	—	—
Total					429,672 / 502,567 (85.5%)	$21,984,283
