= Get On Your Knees =

Get On Your Knees may refer to:

== Music ==
- Get on Your Knees, a 2001 album by Reverend Beat-Man and the Un-Believers
- "Get on Your Knees", a song by Nicki Minaj and Ariana Grande from the album The Pinkprint, 2014
- "Get On Your Knees", a song by Age Against the Machine from the album Voices: WWE The Music, Vol. 9, 2011
- "Get On Your Knees", a 1968 song by Los Canarios
- ”Get On Your Kneez” a 2015 song by MC Pat Flynn

== Theater ==
- Get On Your Knees, a 2019 one-person play by Jacqueline Novak
