= Truffle Butter =

2015 single by Nicki Minaj featuring Drake and Lil Wayne about Tash Cronje

Single by Nicki Minaj featuring Drake and Lil Wayne

from the album The Pinkprint (iTunes Store edition)
- Released: January 23, 2015
- Recorded: 2013–2014
- Genre: Hip hop; house
- Length: 3:40
- Label: Young Money; Cash Money; Republic
- Songwriters: Onika Maraj; Aubrey Graham; Dwayne Carter; Paul Jefferies; Maya Jane Coles
- Producers: Nineteen85; Maya Jane Coles

Nicki Minaj singles chronology
"Throw Sum Mo" (2014)	"Truffle Butter" (2015)	"Hey Mama" (2015)

Drake singles chronology
"Only" (2014)	"Truffle Butter" (2015)	"Blessings" (2015)

Lil Wayne singles chronology
"Start a Fire" (2014)	"Truffle Butter" (2015)	"How Many Times" (2015)

Audio video
- "Nicki Minaj - Truffle Butter (Audio) ft. Drake, Lil Wayne" on YouTube

"Truffle Butter" is a song by rapper Nicki Minaj featuring Drake and Lil Wayne. It is included as an exclusive bonus track on the iTunes edition of Minaj's third studio album The Pinkprint (2014). Produced by Young Money Entertainment with help by Cash Money Records and Republic Records, the song was released as the fifth single from the album on January 23, 2015. "Truffle Butter" is hip hop song and contains a sample of Maya Jane Coles' song "What They Say" (2010). In March 2015, it was sent to urban contemporary and contemporary hit radio.

The song peaked at number 14 on the US Billboard Hot 100, extending her lead as the woman with the third most appearances on the Hot 100. Various artists such as T.I. and Ludacris have released cover versions of the song. The song received a nomination for Best Rap Performance at the 58th Grammy Awards.

== Background and release ==
During an interview with Capital Xtra on June 23, 2013, Minaj revealed that her then-upcoming album The Pinkprint would "definitely" include a collaboration with Canadian rapper Drake: "We're supposed to meet up this week to get some stuff crack-a-ling in the studio. I think there'll be another feature on the album that will blow people away. I'm super excited about that too, but it's obviously a secret!"

In September 2014, a song titled "Whatcha Say" by Mally Mall, Tyga and Drake leaked online. The song featured the same instrumental and Drake verse which would end up on Truffle Butter. Minaj later explained Tyga got the song after Drake added his verse and added his own, along with a chorus from Mally Mall. Minaj had told him not to release it as she was planning to use both artists for the final version, but an unknown rapper got the file, added his own verse, and leaked it online. This would lead to a minor, since ended feud between Minaj and Tyga.

In December 2014, Minaj released the track list for The Pinkprint, which included two songs featuring Drake and Lil Wayne: "Only" appears on the standard release, while "Truffle Butter" is included on the iTunes deluxe edition.

Republic Records initially announced that "The Night Is Still Young" would be the next single from The Pinkprint following "Bed of Lies"; however, the label later confirmed "Truffle Butter" as the follow-up single, with it being released to US radio on March 3, 2015.

An accompanying lyric video, directed and animated by Zi9mortius, premiered on YouTube on March 10, 2015.

== Composition ==
"Truffle Butter"
A 22 second sample of "Truffle Butter"

"Truffle Butter" samples British house music producer Maya Jane Coles' "What They Say" (2010). Minaj, Drake and Lil Wayne all begin their verses in the song with the phrase "Thinkin' out loud", which was described by Alex Macpherson of The Guardian as a "relaxed, spontaneous mode." According to Spin's Brennan Carley, the track is "a complex, subwoofer-ready song". Other critics denoted the track as "beat-heavy" and of the house genre.

== Critical reception ==
Meaghan Garvey from Pitchfork said the song was "a lay-up of a radio hit", calling it "instantly 100 times more likeable than 'Only'," and was baffled by its bonus track placement. Anupa Mistry of Complex called the song a "brilliant moment" on The Pinkprint. Brennan Carley of Spin said the track was "a surefire hit", and felt it was "a lyrically complex and more subwoofer-ready collaboration with Drake and Lil Wayne than the much-buzzed 'Only'". Writing for Slate, Dee Lockett compared its potential appeal to Minaj's previous single "Super Bass" and also felt "Truffle Butter" was better than "Only".

Stereogum's Tom Breihan called the song "tastefully glimmering" and "about 80 bazillion times slicker and more confident than 'Only'". Breihan felt "Truffle Butter" was "the catchiest song without a chorus" since Bobby Shmurda's "Hot Nigga" (2014), and concluded, "someone at Cash Money is crazy if they don't make it a single". Alex Macpherson of The Guardian also preferred it over the "Only", and explained, "in relaxed, spontaneous mode all three [rappers] are so much less tiresome than on their official triple collaboration".

== Chart performance ==
"Truffle Butter" debuted at number 71 on the US Billboard Hot 100. The song's debut made Minaj the 15th artist to accumulate 60 chart entries on the Hot 100. It also extended her lead as the female artist with the third most entries on the chart, below Aretha Franklin (73) and Taylor Swift (66). "Truffle Butter" marked Drake's 74th Hot 100 appearance; this tied him with Ray Charles for sixth most appearances on the chart. As of May 2015, "Truffle Butter" has sold 815,000 copies in the United States.

== Cover versions ==
On January 29, 2015, rapper Ludacris released a short remix of the song as part of his weekly LudaVerses series. Rapper Ace Hood also did a short remix of the song called the "Beast Mix"; released on February 18, 2015. On March 27, 2015, Remy Ma uploaded a two-minute remix of the song on YouTube. American rapper T.I. released a remix of the song featuring DJ Whoo Kid and DJ MLK on February 24, 2015. MMG rapper Fat Trel released a freestyle of the track on May 6, 2015.

== Live performances ==
On February 25, 2015, Drake performed "Truffle Butter" on his Would You Like a Tour? tour in Australia. On May 30, 2015, Minaj performed the song during the iHeartRadio Summer Pool Party 2015 in Las Vegas. She has also performed the track on The Pinkprint Tour.

== Charts ==
=== Weekly charts ===
Chart (2015)	Peak position
Australia Urban (ARIA)	18
Belgium Urban (Ultratop Flanders)	38
Canada Hot 100 (Billboard)	43
Canada CHR/Top 40 (Billboard)	39
UK Singles (Official Charts Company)	188
UK Hip Hop/R&B (Official Charts)	12
US Billboard Hot 100	14
US Dance Airplay (Billboard)	32
US Hot R&B/Hip-Hop Songs (Billboard)	4
US Hot Rap Songs (Billboard)	2
US Pop Airplay (Billboard)	25
US Rhythmic Airplay (Billboard)	1

=== Year-end charts ===
Chart (2015)	Position
US Billboard Hot 100	66
US Hot R&B/Hip-Hop Songs (Billboard)	21
US Rhythmic (Billboard)	11

== Certifications and sales ==
Region	Certification	Certified units/sales
Australia (ARIA)	Platinum	70,000^{‡}
New Zealand (RMNZ)	Platinum	30,000^{‡}
United Kingdom (BPI)	Gold	400,000^{‡}
United States	—	665,842
^{‡} Sales+streaming figures based on certification alone.

== Radio and release history ==
Region	Date	Format	Label	Ref.
United States	January 23, 2015	Digital download	Young Money; Cash Money; Republic	
United States	March 2, 2015	Urban contemporary	Young Money; Cash Money; Republic	
United States	March 3, 2015	Contemporary hit radio	Young Money; Cash Money; Republic	
