= Anaconda (song) =

2014 single by Nicki Minaj

Single by Nicki Minaj

from the album The Pinkprint
- Released: August 4, 2014
- Recorded: April 2014
- Studio: Glenwood Recording Studios (Burbank, California)
- Genre: Dirty rap; hip-hop; miami bass 3:25 (radio edit) 2:56 (Instrumental)
- Label: Young Money; Cash Money; Republic
- Songwriters: Anthony Ray; Onika Maraj; Jamal Jones; Jonathan Solone-Myvett; Ernest Clark; Marcos Palacios
- Producers: Polow da Don; AnonXmous; Da Internz

Nicki Minaj singles chronology
"Bang Bang" (2014)	"Anaconda" (2014)	"Low" (2014)

Music video
- "Anaconda" on YouTube

"Anaconda" is a song by Trinidadian-American rapper Nicki Minaj. It was released on August 4, 2014, by Young Money, Cash Money, and Republic as the second single from her third album, The Pinkprint (2014). The song was produced by Polow da Don, DJ Spydr, and Da Internz, and prominently samples "Baby Got Back" (1992) by Sir Mix-a-Lot. The song's title comes from the sampled line "my anaconda don't want none unless you've got buns, hun". It peaked at number two on the US Billboard Hot 100, becoming Minaj's highest-charting single at the time. The song also peaked within the top ten in Australia, Canada, Ireland, New Zealand and the United Kingdom, top forty in Austria, France and Portugal, and top fifty in Czechia.

Colin Tilley directed an accompanying video for the song, which was released on August 19, 2014. Following the video's release, it broke the 24-hour streaming record on Vevo by accumulating 19.6 million views in its first day of release. In 2021, "Anaconda" became the first music video for a solo female rap song to hit 1 billion views. To further promote the song, Minaj performed it live at the 2014 MTV Video Music Awards and also performed it at Fashion Rocks and the iHeartRadio Music Festival. "Anaconda" was nominated for Best Rap Song at the 2015 Grammy Awards. The song was also nominated for two categories at the 2015 MTV Video Music Awards, Best Female Video and Best Hip-Hop Video, winning the latter.

== Background and composition ==
On August 5, 2014, producer Polow da Don claimed that the "Anaconda" instrumental was originally intended for rapper and musician Missy Elliott, but was scrapped and then re-recorded by Minaj. However, on August 24, 2014, Elliott contradicted Polow's recollections, saying she never received the instrumental. The cover art for the single went viral on the web after being revealed. On various digital music stores, the cover art is censored with the Parental Advisory label over Minaj's buttocks. The song heavily samples "Baby Got Back" by Sir Mix-a-Lot, who also has vocals in the chorus of the song.

The song has been viewed by some as a diss track, in answer to "Baby Got Back". Whereas Sir Mix-a-Lot focuses on a woman's body and the pleasure it gives him, Minaj raps from the perspective of the unnamed woman, and shows how she uses her body to profit and empower herself.

According to Minaj's sound engineer Aubry "Big Juice" Delaine, "Anaconda" had 27 different versions at first. Production team Da Internz were then brought in to add drums to the song, whereafter it was sent for mixing and mastering, which made it "perfect".

Musically, the song is a hip hop and pop-rap song.

== Reception ==
=== Critical response ===
"Anaconda"
A 26-second sample of "Anaconda", which heavily samples "Baby Got Back"

Carolyn Menyes of Music Times called the song "raunchy", though added that it was "expected", saying "Anaconda" continues Minaj's promise to move away from her poppier singles such as "Super Bass" and "Starships", and go back to her hardcore rap roots. Kory Grow from Rolling Stone praised the use of the "Baby Got Back" sample and said the song stayed true to the theme of the original. Kevin Goddard from HotNewHipHop said "Nicki's raunchy new version may be the next big thing to hit the industry." Dan Reilly from Spin said "Minaj takes the good Sir's '92 ode to protruding posteriors and adds a heavy dose of 2014 sex lingo." Amy Davidson from Digital Spy gave the song three stars out of five and said that "Nicki's breaking down barriers."

Sir Mix-a-Lot said he had "a whole new level of respect" for Minaj after hearing the record and that he became a "fan for life".

The song made Spin's end-of-year "The 101 Best Songs of 2014" list. It ranked #3 on the list of 101 entries and was heralded by Spin as "much more than just a song" and a "cultural movement". She was the only rapper to make the top ten of the list as a lead artist. "Anaconda" was also placed at number two on MTV's "Best Songs of 2014" list.

However, despite the positive reviews the song received negative reactions. The London Economic called it "one of the worst songs ever". Critics from National Review referred to the song as "degrading", adding that it promoted prostitution, drug abuse and immorality to young girls. The city of Nahariya in Israel placed the song on a blacklist, prohibiting it from being performed at summer events sponsored by the city. Municipal authorities claimed the record contains "violations of women's dignity", encouraged "a culture of rape and humiliation of women" and that its lyrics are "full of racist words, insults, sexism and homophobia".

=== Commercial performance ===
In the United States, the song debuted at No. 3 on the Digital Songs chart selling 141,000 digital downloads in its first week. Additionally, as Minaj shares lead credit on "Bang Bang", which was No. 2 on that same chart in the same week, Minaj became the first lead act to have two concurrent songs in the top three of the chart since Taylor Swift did it on the list dated September 22, 2012. On the Billboard Hot 100, the song debuted at No. 19, marking Minaj's 51st Hot 100 entry and subsequently breaking out of a tie with Michael Jackson for overall career Hot 100 entries.

For the week ending September 6, 2014, "Anaconda" jumped to No. 2 on the Hot 100, blocked from the top spot by Swift's "Shake It Off". It became Minaj's highest-charting single on that chart at the time. It marked her eleventh top ten single. Its leap into the runner-up position was brought on primarily by the release of its music video, which garnered 32.1 million domestic streams in its first week. That streaming total caused it to consequentially skyrocket to No. 1 on Billboard's Streaming Songs chart. It is the largest one week streaming sum since Miley Cyrus' "Wrecking Ball" received 36.4 million streams for the week ending September 28, 2013. Additionally, the 39-2 ascent for "Anaconda" marks the second-biggest jump ever within the Hot 100's top 40. Only Black Eyed Peas made a bigger leap in the region when "Boom Boom Pow" blasted to No. 1 on April 18, 2009. "Anaconda" was certified double platinum by the Recording Industry Association of America (RIAA) in November 2014 and has sold 1.3 million copies in the US as of December 2014 and over 9 million total units in the US as of February 2025.

== Music video ==
A music video for the track was shot in Los Angeles. It was directed by Colin Tilley and was released on August 19, 2014. The video features a cameo appearance by fellow rapper and labelmate Drake. The video broke the 24-hour streaming record on Vevo by accumulating 19.6 million views in its first day of release, beating the 19.3 million 24-hour record previously held by Miley Cyrus for the music video of her song, "Wrecking Ball", in 2013. On August 30, 2014, eleven days after the release of the music video, "Anaconda" was Vevo certified for receiving over 100 million views. In 2015 Taylor Swift surpassed Minaj's record with the video for her single "Bad Blood" which got 20.1 million views in 24 hours.

In a review of Minaj's video, Lucas Villa of AXS wrote, "It's butts abound in her bananas clip for 'Anaconda." NBC host Al Roker called the music video "vile" and "desperate". Roker said, "It almost seems like Minaj has gotten desperate and needs to do something to get her crown back." Molly Lambert of Grantland was complimentary, writing "the video is about Nicki asserting her power, not as a sexual object but a sexual subject." It was named one of the sexiest videos of 2014 by VH1.

In France, the clip was broadcast during the day in a blurred version with the warning Not advised to kids under 10 years old (in French : déconseillé aux moins de 10 ans) on some channels while it was banned from others to TV broadcasting before 10 p.m. with a warning Not advised to kids under 12 years old (in French : déconseillé aux moins de 12 ans) because of the theme of the video, the vulgarity, the sexual and erotic scenes it gives off. On other channels, the clip is broadcast without blurring and without signage but very late in the evening.

As of April 3, 2021, the video has gained more than 1 billion views, being the first female rap solo song to do so. Billboard also named "Anaconda" the 13th greatest video of the decade.

== Live performances ==
On 24 August 2014, Minaj first performed the song live at the 2014 MTV Video Music Awards. The performance followed Ariana Grande's individual performance of her single "Break Free" and was followed by a performance of Jessie J, Grande, and Minaj's joint single "Bang Bang". On September 9, 2014, Minaj performed the song live at Fashion Rocks. On September 19, 2014, Minaj performed the song at the 2014 iHeartRadio Music Festival. On November 9, 2014, Minaj performed "Anaconda" at the 2014 MTV Europe Music Awards in a three-song medley including her other songs "Super Bass" and "Bed of Lies" featuring Skylar Grey. Minaj has performed the song on The Pinkprint Tour, The Nicki Wrld Tour and Pink Friday 2 World Tour.

== Legacy ==
The song has been played and referenced several times on The Ellen DeGeneres Show, including Ellen DeGeneres doing a music video parody of the song which was unveiled during Minaj's appearance on the show in 2014.

The Fine Brothers released two videos on their YouTube channel of teens reacting to "Anaconda", and elders reacting to "Anaconda". They later made a song out of the reactions and released it for purchase on iTunes.

The song was briefly sung by a group of bunnies in the 2016 movie, Sing. Due to the explicit lyrics of the song, they only sang the lines, "Oh, my, gosh. Look at her butt". A remix of the line was released on the deluxe version of the Sing: Original Motion Picture Soundtrack and was entitled "OH. MY. GOSH."

The song was used as the first "lip-sync for your legacy" song on the third season of RuPaul's Drag Race: All Stars. As the two challenge winners, contestants Aja and BenDeLaCreme lip-synced to the song, with BenDeLaCreme winning.

The song is referenced in the LitRPG novel The Butcher’s Masquerade by American author Matt Dinniman.

== Credits and personnel ==
Recording

- Recorded at Glenwood Recording Studios, Burbank, California

Personnel

- Songwriting – Onika Tanya Maraj, Jamal Jones, Jonathan Solone-Myvett, Ernest Clark, Marcos Palacios, Anthony Ray
- Production – Polow da Don, Anonymous,
- Co-production – Da Internz, Eric Bellinger
- Recording – Aubry "Big Juice" Delaine
- Mixing – Jaycen Joshua
- Mixing assistant — Ryan Kaul
- Mastering – Chris Athens

== Charts ==
=== Weekly charts ===
Weekly chart performance for "Anaconda"
Chart (2014–2015)	Peak position
Australia (ARIA)	8
Australian Urban (ARIA)	1
Austria (Ö3 Austria Top 40)	36
Belgium (Ultratop 50 Flanders)	22
Belgium (Ultratop 50 Wallonia)	33
Canada Hot 100 (Billboard)	3
Canada CHR/Top 40 (Billboard)	27
CIS Airplay (TopHit)	171
Czech Republic Singles Digital (ČNS IFPI)	47
Denmark (Tracklisten)	37
Euro Digital Song Sales (Billboard)	6
Finland Download (Latauslista)	26
France (SNEP)	38
France Airplay (SNEP)	23
Germany (GfK)	18
Ireland (IRMA)	10
Italy (FIMI)	52
Mexico Anglo (Monitor Latino)	18
Netherlands (Dutch Top 40)	30
Netherlands (Single Top 100)	38
New Zealand (Recorded Music NZ)	9
Portugal (AFP)	39
Scottish Singles Sales (Official Charts)	2
Slovakia Singles Digital (ČNS IFPI)	19
South Korea International Downloads (Gaon)	80
Spain (Promusicae)	38
Sweden (Sverigetopplistan)	30
Switzerland (Schweizer Hitparade)	55
UK Singles (Official Charts)	3
UK Hip Hop/R&B (Official Charts)	1
US Billboard Hot 100	2
US Hot R&B/Hip-Hop Songs (Billboard)	1
US Dance Club Songs (Billboard)	22
US Pop Airplay (Billboard)	21
US Rhythmic Airplay (Billboard)	4

=== Year-end charts ===
Year-end chart performance for "Anaconda"
Chart (2014)	Position
Australia (ARIA)	62
Canada (Canadian Hot 100)	48
US Billboard Hot 100	36
US Hot R&B/Hip-Hop Songs (Billboard)	9
US Rhythmic (Billboard)	40

== Certifications ==
Certifications and sales for "Anaconda"
Region	Certification	Certified units/sales
Australia (ARIA)	4× Platinum	280,000^{‡}
Brazil (Pro-Música Brasil)	Diamond	250,000^{‡}
Denmark (IFPI Danmark)	Gold	45,000^{‡}
Germany (BVMI)	Gold	200,000^{‡}
Italy (FIMI)	Gold	25,000^{‡}
New Zealand (RMNZ)	Platinum	15,000^{*}
Norway (IFPI Norway)	Gold	5,000^{‡}
Sweden (GLF)	Gold	20,000^{‡}
United Kingdom (BPI)	Platinum	600,000^{‡}
United States (RIAA)	2× Platinum	2,000,000^{‡}
^{*} Sales figures based on certification alone.^{‡} Sales+streaming figures based on certification alone.

== Release history ==
Release dates for "Anaconda"
Country	Date	Format	Label
Various	August 4, 2014	Digital download	Young Money Entertainment; Cash Money; Republic
United States	August 12, 2014	Contemporary hit radio	Young Money Entertainment; Cash Money; Republic
United States	August 12, 2014	Rhythmic contemporary and Urban contemporary radio	Young Money Entertainment; Cash Money; Republic
United Kingdom	October 5, 2014	Digital download	Young Money Entertainment; Cash Money; Republic

== See also ==
- List of number-one R&B/hip-hop songs of 2014 (U.S.)
- List of UK R&B Chart number-one singles of 2014
- Cultural history of the buttocks
