= Bed of Lies (disambiguation) =

Bed of Lies is a 2014 song by Nicki Minaj featuring Skylar Grey

Bed of Lies may also refer to:

- Bed of Lies, a 1992 film starring Chris Cooper and Susan Dey
- "Bed of Lies", a 2000 song by Matchbox Twenty from Mad Season
