= The Pinkprint =

- Standard edition cover (Note: The deluxe edition cover features a white background. The tenth anniversary edition cover features a rose background.)

Studio album by Nicki Minaj
- Released: December 15, 2014
- Recorded: 2013–2014
- Studios: Jungle City (New York City); Evdon (Toronto); Glenwood (Burbank); Luke's In The Boo (Malibu, California); Record Plant (Hollywood); Conway; Eightysevenfourteen (Los Angeles)
- Genre: Hip-hop
- Length: 66:51
- Labels: Young Money; Cash Money; Republic
- Producers: A.C; Anonymous; Arch Tha Boss; Kane Beatz; Boi-1da; Darhyl "Hey DJ" Camper; Cardo; Chinza//Fly; Cirkut; Detail; Keith Harris; Hit-Boy; Hitmaka; Parker Ighile; JMIKE; Shama "Sak Pase" Joseph; Dr. Luke; Metro Boomin; Mike Will Made It; Nineteen85; @Oakwud; The Order; Polow da Don; @PopWansel; Vinylz; will.i.am; Zaytoven

Nicki Minaj chronology
| Pink Friday: Roman Reloaded – The Re-Up (2012) | The Pinkprint (2014) | Queen (2018) |

Singles from The Pinkprint
- 1. "Pills n Potions" Released: May 21, 2014; 2. "Anaconda" Released: August 4, 2014; 3. "Only" Released: October 28, 2014; 4. "Bed of Lies" Released: November 16, 2014; 5. "Truffle Butter" Released: January 23, 2015; 6. "The Night Is Still Young" Released: April 12, 2015

The Pinkprint is the third studio album by rapper Nicki Minaj. It was released on December 15, 2014, by Young Money Entertainment, Cash Money Records and Republic Records. Departing from the dance-pop elements of her previous album, Pink Friday: Roman Reloaded (2012), The Pinkprint is driven by Minaj's traditional hip hop roots. Minaj executive produced the album alongside Birdman, Lil Wayne, and Ronald Williams.

The Pinkprint received generally positive reviews from music critics, with many complimenting its production and personal lyrics. It was included in several publications' year-end and decade-end lists. In 2016, it received a Grammy nomination for Best Rap Album. The album peaked at number two on the US Billboard 200 with 244,000 album-equivalent units in its first week, of which 198,000 were pure sales. It also charted within the top ten in Canada, Norway, and Sweden, and the top twenty in Australia, Croatia, Finland, and Greece. As of December 2015, it has sold 682,000 pure copies in the US, and has since been certified 2× Platinum by the Recording Industry Association of America (RIAA).

The Pinkprint spawned six singles: "Pills n Potions", "Anaconda", "Only", "Bed of Lies", "The Night Is Still Young", and the initially iTunes-exclusive track "Truffle Butter". "Anaconda" peaked at number two on the US Billboard Hot 100, becoming Minaj's highest-charting single at the time, while four other singles peaked within the top 40. To promote the album, Minaj embarked on her third concert tour, titled The Pinkprint Tour, from March to August 2015, spanning more than fifty shows over the five months.

== Background and production ==
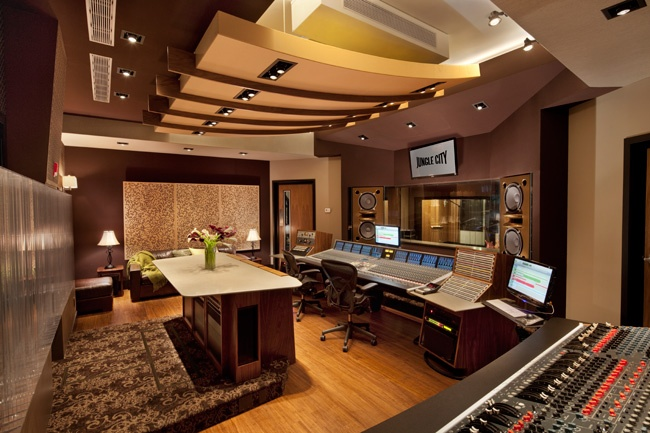
Parts of the album were recorded at Jungle City Studios (pictured).

In 2013, Minaj stated that she would begin writing material for her third album later that year, after production was completed for her supporting role in her first feature film, The Other Woman (2014). She noted that there were currently no featured artists on the record, and commented that she was "just enjoying [the] creative process". Recording sessions for the album took place at Jungle City Studios New York, NY; Evdon Studios, Toronto, Canada; Glenwood Recording Studios, Burbank, CA; Luke's In The Boo, Malibu, CA; Record Plant, Hollywood, CA; Conway Recording Studios, Los Angeles, CA; and Eightysevenfourteen Studios, Los Angeles, CA. In November 2013, Minaj described the project as "next level", "very different from anything I've done", adding that she had explored pop music but never had the intention to continue with the genre.

During the recording process Minaj recorded two songs that were inspired by Irish Celtic singer-songwriter Enya; Minaj stated that the songs contain "airiness and the whimsicalness" that reminded her of Enya. In 2014, singer-songwriter Skylar Grey wrote and recorded a demo version of a song entitled "Bed of Lies" and the song was later sent to Minaj, who wrote and recorded verses of her own to the song. In August 2014, Minaj's manager informed her that Beyoncé wanted to make a remix of "Flawless" with her, and in return she would feature on The Pinkprint. Minaj said that she wrote her verse in New York and Beyoncé visited her in the studio and encouraged her. During the album's production, Minaj worked with a variety of people including Dr. Luke, Ester Dean, Boi-1da and Detail. Minaj also hoped to have guest features from Rihanna and Drake. While Rihanna did not appear on the album, Drake was featured on two songs from the album, along with fellow Young Money labelmate Lil Wayne, on "Only" and "Truffle Butter", with the latter appearing exclusively on the deluxe edition of the album.

In September, Minaj stated that "it was her best album to date", saying she had grown as a writer and was able to speak about topics that she had felt uncomfortable sharing two years ago. Later that month, Minaj characterized the album as consisting of "raw talent, emotion, hard spitting and everything that people have come to love about Nicki Minaj". In November 2014, Minaj revealed she had recorded 25 songs for the album, stating she would find a song that "sits" with her and then mold that track for a while until she was satisfied; she said her biggest problem during the recording process was cutting songs from the final track listing as each track was "special" to her. In November 2014, Minaj described the record as "personal" and an "emotional rollercoaster" to MTV News.

The album's title was inspired by The Blueprint (2001) by Jay-Z, with Minaj stating that "He did such a great job of creating this Blueprint brand for male rappers and I wanted to do that [for] female rappers to be able to pattern themselves with what I've done one day". In an interview, Minaj was asked what similarities there were with Jay Z's album, to which she replied:

I have no idea what he was doing before The Blueprint dropped. It's not that literal. People keep asking me about Jay's The Blueprint and they think I'm doing something like that. I made reference to The Blueprint because Jay is the biggest rapper of our time. The name of the album was inspired by Jay but not the body of work. I do think that it's going to create new rules, though, in [the way] that [The Blueprint did].

== Music and lyrics ==
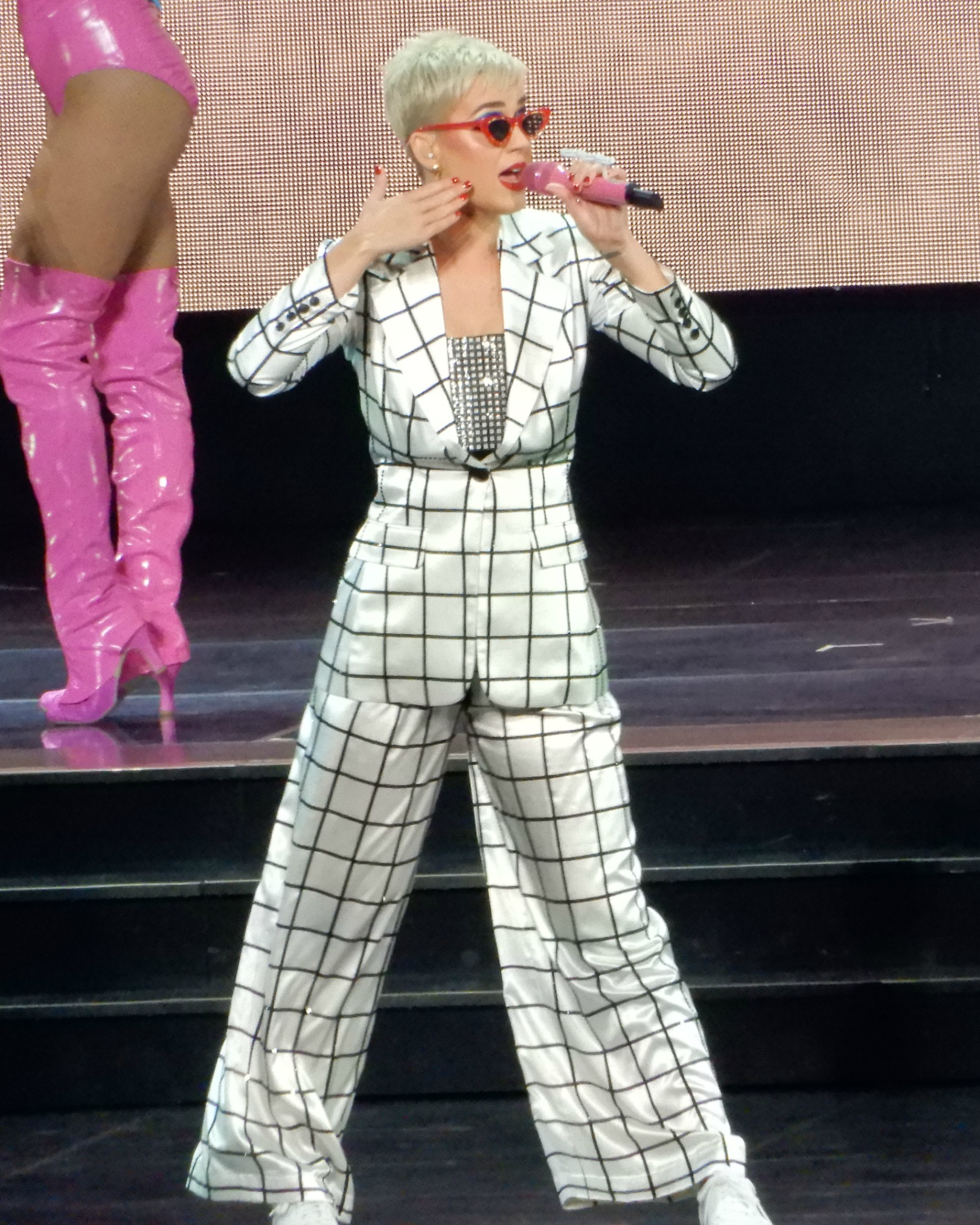
"Get on Your Knees" co-written by Katy Perry.

The Pinkprint is primarily a hip hop album. Speaking on the album's musical style, Minaj stated that the album would "focus on rap" and "feed the core rap fan", whereas Pink Friday: Roman Reloaded explored more prominent elements of dance music. In April 2014, Minaj told MTV News "the tracks on [my next album] are back to my hip-hop roots. And I don't think it's something that I'm necessarily trying to do [but] as soon as I started working on my new album, that's just the songs that I've been writing". Minaj stated the album's lyrics touch upon themes of her family, loss, death and her struggle with guilt. The Pinkprint opens with the autobiographical song, "All Things Go", which was described as a sequel to Minaj's song "Autobiography" off her Sucka Free mixtape in 2008. A mid-tempo ballad, which slowly unfolds and contains "heavy beats and heavy bass" along with "subtle synths". The lyrics discuss a wide range of personal issues Minaj has faced, from reflecting on fame and the speed in which her life has moved, to strained relationships with her family including the murder of her cousin Nicholas Telemaque, to her relationship with her mother and her own child which references an abortion. "I Lied" is a ballad that contains a torpid production that does not change tempo. Lyrically, the song revolves around a "complicated regret" in which Minaj admits she denied her love for a man in order to stop him from breaking her heart. "The Crying Game" features initially uncredited vocals from British musician Jessie Ware, before being officially credited at a later date. The song mixes "sombre balladry with downbeat guitar loops" and is described as one of the album's most emotional songs. During the song, Minaj alternates between "devastating verses and pensive crooning" whilst Ware adds "haunting" and "soulful" vocals to the chorus. During an interview for Malcolm Music, Ware revealed how the collaboration came about, saying that she wrote the song with Pop Wansel for her own album Tough Love (2014) but ultimately felt that it didn't fit the album. Wansel subsequently sent the song to Minaj, who recorded her own vocals to turn the song into a collaboration between Ware and Minaj. Initial pressings of the album did not list Ware as being featured, something Ware added was a mistake and later corrected.

"Get on Your Knees" features vocals from American singer Ariana Grande. Minaj raps in a "trance-like" style as she demands things from her male partner, which hints at oral sex, and is described as a "fetish obsession with seeing their man on all fours". "Feeling Myself" features singer-songwriter Beyoncé, and is built over a West Coast synth, driving bass and drums along with bells and whistles incorporated into the production. "Only" is a hip-hop song that features guest appearances from Drake, Lil Wayne, and Chris Brown, who sings the chorus of the song. The song contains an "icy" production that sits "ominously" underneath dirty lyrical metaphors. "Want Some More" (with uncredited vocals from Jeremih) features lyrics that see Minaj stroking her own ego and check anyone who dares to doubt her worth. During the song, Minaj makes references to Eminem, Kanye West and Lil Wayne and states she is her "only competition". "Four Door Aventador" has humming and low-key production with lyrics revolving around mafia imagery. The song is compared to the work of the Notorious B.I.G.

"Favorite" features American R&B singer Jeremih and is a return to a "romantic narrative" following the four previous songs, which features Minaj bragging. The song is lyrically sexually explicit and sees Jeremih singing about wanting to be Nicki's favorite. Minaj raps about wanting to be the "primary role in a man's life". "Buy a Heart" features rapper Meek Mill, who sings the hook of the song. "Trini Dem Girls" is a dancehall track that features a guest appearance from rapper LunchMoney Lewis. The song contains echoing handclaps and a "Diwali Riddim" with a "blaring" chorus. "Anaconda" is a hip-hop and pop rap song that heavily samples "Baby Got Back" by Sir Mix-a-Lot. The song's lyrical content is described as "raunchy" and noted for containing a "heavy dose of 2014 sex lingo". "The Night Is Still Young" is a pop song with verses revolving around a routine night out at a club.

The lead single, "Pills n Potions" is a slow-burning piano ballad that contains prominent elements of hip hop, R&B and pop. The song opens with a sparse, haunting drum beat, while Minaj sings the pre-chorus in a feather-like near-whisper. As the song's pre-chorus repeats, an echo effect is added to her vocals, and "blooming" chants are sung to create the song's chorus. The song's lyrics revolve around someone who has wronged her but she still loves. "Bed of Lies" features guest vocals from singer-songwriter Skylar Grey and is a slow-tempo song built over triumphant production, pianos, rolling drums and booming bass. The song opens with Grey's chorus and a restrained keyboard set before Minaj begins to rap about an ex-lover. "Grand Piano" is the final song on the album's standard version and is the only song on the album that is not a hip hop song; it features no rapping from Minaj nor drums. The song is a ballad that contains pianos and violins, with lyrics revolving around Minaj "feeling stupid" and feeling "played" by a former lover.

== Singles ==
"Pills n Potions" was released as the lead single from the album on May 21, 2014. Minaj announced the release at the 2014 Billboard Music Awards. The song peaked at number 24 on the US Billboard Hot 100.

"Anaconda" was released as the second single from the album on August 4, 2014. The song samples Sir Mix-a-Lot's "Baby Got Back" and peaked at number two on the Billboard Hot 100, becoming Minaj's highest-charting single in the US at the time. It topped both the Hot R&B/Hip-Hop Songs and the Hot Rap Songs charts for six weeks. Additionally, the song peaked within the top ten in countries including Australia, Canada, Ireland, New Zealand and the United Kingdom.

"Only", which features Drake, Lil Wayne and Chris Brown, was released as the third single from the album on October 28, 2014. The song peaked at number 12 on the Billboard Hot 100 and topped the Hot R&B/Hip-Hop Songs.

"Bed of Lies" featuring Skylar Grey was released as the fourth single from the album on November 16, 2014. Minaj debuted the song at the 2014 MTV Europe Music Awards. The song peaked at number 62 on the Billboard Hot 100. "

"Truffle Butter" with Drake and Lil Wayne was initially released as an iTunes exclusive track, before hitting US Radio in March of 2015. The song had peaked at number 14 on the Billboard Hot 100.

"The Night Is Still Young" was the sixth and final single off the album. Officially released in the UK on April 12, 2015, and later in the US on April 28, 2015, and peaked at number 31 on the Billboard Hot 100.

== Release and promotion ==
=== Title and release date ===
The album's title was announced as well as the premiere of the track "Lookin Ass" and its Nabil Elderkin-directed music video on February 12, 2014. In August 2014, Minaj confirmed that the album would be released in the fourth quarter of the year. In September 2014, Minaj announced through her Twitter account that the album would be released on November 24, 2014. In late October, her management announced that the album had been rescheduled for release on December 15.

The album was made available for pre-order on iTunes on December 3, 2014, with the intro track "All Things Go" as an instant download. The standard version of The Pinkprint features sixteen songs, while the initial deluxe version is packaged with three additional tracks. American retailer Best Buy packaged the latter edition with a smaller version of Minaj's 2015 calendar. "Truffle Butter" and "Wamables" are respectively included as the twentieth songs on the iTunes Store and Japanese pressings of the record. A fifth deluxe variant (distributed by American retailer Target and the United Kingdom) lists "Mona Lisa" and "Put You in a Room" as the twentieth and twenty-first tracks, although most of the tracks on this version are abbreviated to fit the exclusive material. During the first week of retail availability, it was discovered that physical deluxe versions of The Pinkprint were unintentionally shipped worldwide with an instrumental version of "Anaconda" instead of the original track. In contrast to the vibrantly colored wardrobe and hairpieces she had become associated with earlier in her career, Minaj embraced a more understated image during the first promotional runs for The Pinkprint. She opined that "You can either continue doing costumes or you can just say, 'Hey guess what? This will shock them even more. Doing nothing will shock them even more'".

"Truffle Butter" featuring Drake and Lil Wayne was released separately from the album to iTunes and Spotify on January 23, 2015, after initially being an iTunes-exclusive bonus track, and was serviced to US radio on March 3, 2015. The song peaked at number 14 on the Billboard Hot 100.

=== Cover art ===
On November 2, 2014, Minaj released the album's artwork, which was created by Joe Perez's design studio, who works for Kanye West's creative team Donda. It displays a "sandy" textured pink "splatter" with a thumbprint placed in the middle of a black background on the standard version and a white background for the deluxe version. On December 1, 2014, the track listing was released to the public, and confirmed collaborations with Ariana Grande, Beyoncé, Drake, Lil Wayne, Chris Brown, Jeremih, Meek Mill, LunchMoney Lewis, Jessie Ware and Skylar Grey.

=== Live performances ===
On November 23, 2014, Minaj performed "Bed of Lies" at the American Music Awards. On December 6, 2014, Minaj appeared as a musical guest on an episode of NBC's Saturday Night Live alongside host James Franco. She performed three songs from the album: "Bed of Lies", "Only" and "All Things Go". She also participated in a few skits. During album release week, Minaj visited a few talk shows in promotion for the album. On December 15, Minaj appeared on The Ellen DeGeneres Show for an interview and also performed "Bed of Lies". On December 16, Minaj appeared on The Today Show for an interview and another performance. That same night, she appeared on The Tonight Show Starring Jimmy Fallon for an interview. On December 18, Minaj appeared on 106 & Park as the show's final guest artist to discuss the album and the show's legacy. On December 19, Minaj appeared on The Real for an interview. On January 18, 2015, MTV aired My Time Again, a documentary filmed during the final stages of the making of The Pinkprint, which featured behind the scenes clips of Minaj in the studio and in rehearsals, and interviews with Minaj and footage of her with her family. In May 2015, she performed "The Night Is Still Young" and "Hey Mama" at the Billboard Music Awards. Minaj also opened the 2015 MTV Video Music Awards with a performance of "Trini Dem Girls", then "The Night Is Still Young" and "Bad Blood" with Taylor Swift.

=== The Pinkprint Tour ===
Minaj supported the album with a 17-date European tour which commenced on March 16, 2015, in Stockholm, Sweden and stopped off in Ireland, the United Kingdom, Norway, Germany, France, Belgium and the Netherlands before ending on April 12, 2015, in Glasgow, Scotland. Trey Songz was the opening act.

=== 10th Anniversary ===
On October 13, 2024, Minaj announced that The Pinkprint would be available to purchase on vinyl for the album's tenth anniversary. On November 22nd, the new version of the Pinkprint gave four brand new songs, being "Arctic Tundra (feat. Juice WRLD)", "If It's Okay (feat. David Guetta & Davido)", "Cap Backwards (feat. Swae Lee)" and "Remember Me" (feat. Parker Ighile)". Minaj also gave a brand new lyric video for 'Anaconda'.

The album's re-release on vinyl and the 10th Anniversary edition had landed a re-entry on the Billboard 200 Albums chart, within the top 40.

== Critical reception ==
Professional ratings
Aggregate scores
| Source | Rating |
|---|---|
| AnyDecentMusic? | 6.6/10 |
| Metacritic | 70/100 |
Review scores
| Source | Rating |
| AllMusic | 4/5 stars |
| The A.V. Club | B |
| Billboard | 4/5 stars |
| Cuepoint (Expert Witness) | A− |
| Exclaim! | 8/10 stars |
| HipHopDX | 4/5 stars |
| Los Angeles Times | 3/4 stars |
| Pitchfork | 7.5/10 |
| Rolling Stone | 4/5 stars |
| Spin | 7/10 |

The Pinkprint received generally positive reviews from critics, with many praising the production and her personal lyrics. Metacritic, which uses a weighted average, assigned the album a score of 70 out of 100, based on 25 reviews, indicating "generally favorable reviews".

Billboard magazine's Niki McGloster called it "her best album to date. Minaj was finally able to out-rap herself and purge issues she's struggled with in private in her most exposed fashion yet". In Cuepoint, Robert Christgau commended the "narrative arc" of her vulnerable songs, but felt the album is defined more so by the bonus tracks, as "Minaj returns to her triumphalist mode prepared to embrace the role of a 32-year-old woman ready for love" Pitchfork editor Meaghan Garvey said the album finale comprises "a thrilling, confounding six-song set that elevates The Pinkprint from an occasionally transcendent break-up album to something far more intriguing," adding that "the album presented Minaj in her most unexpected role yet: a human being."

Spin's Brennan Carley felt the more emotionally vulnerable songs were counterintuitive, with Minaj "muting her own strengths and songwriting abilities in favor of excising her emotional demons", although "her rapping is so on-point that even in confessional mode, [she] lets the public finally buy her heart." Jon Caramanica of The New York Times found the album to be "full of compromises and half-successes" as Minaj is "capable of grand technical feats, rapid cadence switching and complex rhyme patterns, but generally she puts those fireworks to the side when diving deep into her feelings." Kyle Anderson of Entertainment Weekly criticized the ballads as "ponderous". The A.V. Club's Sheldon Pearce praised her honest songwriting and concluded that The Pinkprint is "the closest Minaj has ever gotten to balancing her tendencies". Randall Roberts from the Los Angeles Times stated that throughout the album, Minaj is "intent on channeling her talent to explore and document her many moods. The combination is often, if not always, intoxicating".

== Accolades ==
Critics' year-end lists
| Publication | List | Rank | Ref. |
|---|---|---|---|
| Complex | The 50 Best Albums of 2014 | 6 | |
| Rolling Stone | The 40 Best Rap Albums of 2014 | 1 | |
| Spin | The 40 Best Hip-Hop Albums of 2014 | 13 | |

Critics' decade-end lists
| Publication | List | Rank | Ref. |
|---|---|---|---|
| Pitchfork | The 200 Best Albums of the 2010s | 79 | |
| Rolling Stone | The 100 Best Albums of the 2010s | 60 | |
| Vice | The 100 Best Albums of the Decade | 84 | |

Awards
| Year | Ceremony | Category | Result | Ref. |
|---|---|---|---|---|
| 2015 | American Music Awards | Favorite Rap/Hip-Hop Album | Won | |
| 2015 | BET Hip Hop Awards | Album of the Year | Nominated | |
| 2015 | Billboard Music Awards | Top Rap Album | Nominated | |
| 2016 | 58th Annual Grammy Awards | Best Rap Album | Nominated | |

== Commercial performance ==
The Pinkprint debuted at number two on the US Billboard 200, with 244,000 album-equivalent units (with 198,000 coming from pure sales and 46,000 combined track-equivalent units and streams) in its first week, behind Taylor Swift's 1989 which was spending its sixth week at number one. The album was streamed 16.8 million times across all on-demand streaming services in the United States during its first week. In its second week on the chart, it stayed at number two moving an additional 156,000 units, which included 105,000 pure sales.The Pinkprint held the number two position for three weeks before falling to number three on the Billboard 200. As of December 2015, the album has sold 682,000 copies in the United States. In February 2016, the RIAA certified the album double platinum, for combined album sales, on-demand audio, video streams, and track sales equivalent of two million album-equivalent units.The album has sold over eight million units worldwide to date.

== Track listing ==
The Pinkprint track listing
| No. | Title | Writer(s) | Producer(s) | Length |
|---|---|---|---|---|
| 1. | "All Things Go" | Onika Maraj; Matthew Samuels; Ester Dean; Anderson Hernandez; Allen Ritter | Boi-1da; Vinylz; Ritter^{[a]} | 4:53 |
| 2. | "I Lied" | Maraj; Michael Williams; Marcus Bell; Dean | Mike Will Made It; Skooly^{[a]} | 5:04 |
| 3. | "The Crying Game" (featuring Jessie Ware) | Maraj; Andrew "Pop" Wansel; Warren "Oak" Felder; Jessie Ware; Steve Mostyn | Pop Wansel; Oak Felder | 4:25 |
| 4. | "Get on Your Knees" (featuring Ariana Grande) | Maraj; Katy Perry; Chloe Angelides; Lukasz Gottwald; Sarah Hudson; Jacob Kasher Hindlin; Henry Walter | Dr. Luke; Cirkut | 3:36 |
| 5. | "Feeling Myself" (featuring Beyoncé) | Maraj; Beyoncé Knowles; Solana Rowe; Chauncey Hollis | Hit-Boy; Beyoncé^{[b]} | 3:57 |
| 6. | "Only" (featuring Drake, Lil Wayne and Chris Brown) | Maraj; Aubrey Graham; Dwayne Carter, Jr.; Gottwald; Walter; Jeremy Coleman; Theron Thomas; Timothy Thomas | Dr. Luke; Cirkut; JMIKE | 5:12 |
| 7. | "Want Some More" (featuring Jeremih) | Maraj; Jeremih Felton; Xavier Dotson; Christian Ward; Leland Wayne | Zaytoven; Hitmaka; Metro Boomin; Minaj^{[a]} | 3:49 |
| 8. | "Four Door Aventador" | Maraj; Ame Asabe Ighile; Parker Ighile | Parker | 3:02 |
| 9. | "Favorite" (featuring Jeremih) | Maraj; Robert Williams; Felton; Darhyl "Hey DJ" Camper; Rob Holladay; Ward | Camper; Minaj^{[a]}; Holladay^{[a]} | 4:02 |
| 10. | "Buy a Heart" (featuring Meek Mill) | Maraj; R. Williams; Graham; Ward; Alicia Keys; Armond Redmen | Arch Tha Boss; Hitmaka | 4:15 |
| 11. | "Trini Dem Girls" (featuring LunchMoney Lewis) | Maraj; Coleman; Gottwald; Hindlin; Gamal Lewis; Theron Thomas; Alexander Castillo Vasquez; Walter | Dr. Luke; Cirkut; A.C; JMIKE | 3:14 |
| 12. | "Anaconda" | Maraj; Jamal Jones; Jonathan Solone-Myvett; Ernest Clark; Marcos Palacios; Anthony Ray; Ralph Thane | Polow da Don; AnonXmous; Da Internz^{[a]}; DJ Spydr | 4:20 |
| 13. | "The Night Is Still Young" | Maraj; Dean; Gottwald; Theron Thomas; Walter | Dr. Luke; Cirkut | 3:47 |
| 14. | "Pills n Potions" | Maraj; Dean; Gottwald; Walter | Dr. Luke; Cirkut | 4:27 |
| 15. | "Bed of Lies" (featuring Skylar Grey) | Maraj; Holly Haffermann; Daniel Johnson; Coleman; Breyan Isaac; Vinay Vyas; Justin Davey; Alexander Grant | Kane Beatz; JMIKE; Alex da Kid^{[a]}; Isaac^{[a]}; T.O.D.A.Y.^{[a]} | 4:29 |
| 16. | "Grand Piano" | Maraj; Johnson; Dean; William Adams; Keith Harris; Peter Lord | will.i.am; Harris; Kane Beatz; Minaj^{[a]}; T.O.D.A.Y.^{[a]}; The Mad Violinist^{[a]} | 4:19 |
| Total length: | | | | 66:51 |

Deluxe edition bonus tracks
| No. | Title | Writer(s) | Producer(s) | Length |
|---|---|---|---|---|
| 17. | "Big Daddy" (featuring Meek Mill) | Maraj; R. Williams; Ronald LaTour; Johnny Juliano; Daveon Jackson; Brock Korsan | Cardo; Juliano^{[a]}; YeX^{[a]} | 3:25 |
| 18. | "Shanghai" | Maraj; Robert V Sample; Steven Nathaniel Pugh; Irvin Whitlow; Deshawn Kennedy; Ward | Chinza//Fly; Minaj^{[a]} | 3:39 |
| 19. | "Win Again" | Maraj; Shama "Sak Pase" Joseph; Lasanna Harris | Joseph | 4:10 |
| Total length: | | | | 77:59 |

2017 digital deluxe reissue bonus tracks
| No. | Title | Writer(s) | Producer(s) | Length |
|---|---|---|---|---|
| 20. | "Truffle Butter" (featuring Drake and Lil Wayne) | Maraj; Graham; Carter, Jr.; Paul Jefferies; Maya Jane Coles | Nineteen85 | 3:39 |
| 21. | "Mona Lisa" | Maraj; Noel Fisher; Andre Proctor | Detail | 3:28 |
| 22. | "Put You in a Room" | Maraj; Proctor; Rasool Diaz; Brian Soko; Fisher | The Order; Detail^{[a]} | 2:59 |
| 23. | "Wamables" | Maraj; Proctor; Diaz; Soko; Fisher; Ramirez | The Order; Detail^{[a]} | 3:13 |
| Total length: | | | | 91:00 |

2024 tenth anniversary edition bonus tracks
| No. | Title | Writer(s) | Producer(s) | Length |
|---|---|---|---|---|
| 1. | "Turn Yo Cap Back (Cap Backwards)" (featuring Swae Lee) | Maraj; Khalif Brown; Bach Hoang Nguyentran; Jagvir Aujla | Jaegen; FrancisGotHeat | 3:01 |
| 2. | "If It's Okay" (featuring David Guetta and Davido) | Maraj; Boaz De Jong; Brittany Talia Hazzard; David Adeleke; David Guetta; Giorgio Tuinfort; Oliver Jessy Eze | Guetta; Tuinfort; Boaz van de Beatz | 3:44 |
| 3. | "Arctic Tundra" (featuring Juice Wrld) | Maraj; Bryan Simmons; Dylan Cleary-Krell; Filip Gezin; Jarad Higgins; Max Lord | Dez Wright; Gezin; TM88 | 4:29 |
| 4. | "Remember Me" (featuring Parker Ighile) | Maraj; Dion Wardle; Ighile | Parker | 2:56 |
| Total length: | | | | 105:10 |

Notes

- ^{^[a]} signifies a co-producer
- ^{^[b]} signifies an additional vocal producer
- "Want Some More" contains additional vocals by Jeremih.
- "Shanghai" contains additional vocals by Yung Berg.
- "Buy a Heart" contains excerpts of "Stay" performed by Henry Krinkle and "Un-Thinkable (I'm Ready)" performed by Alicia Keys.
- "Anaconda" contains a sample of "Baby Got Back" performed by Sir Mix-a-Lot.
- "Grand Piano" contains interpolations from "Rush Rush", written by Peter Lord and performed by Paula Abdul.
- "Truffle Butter" contains a sample of "What They Say" performed by Maya Jane Coles.
- Some initial physical copies of the album did not include Jessie Ware's feature on "The Crying Game" due to a printing mistake.
- "Truffle Butter" was initially available exclusively on the iTunes Store edition as track 17.
- "Wamables" was initially available exclusively on the Japanese edition as track 20.
- "Mona Lisa", and "Put You in a Room" were initially available exclusively on the Target and international deluxe edition as track 20 and 21.
- The 2015 iTunes Store deluxe edition included the bonus content "YMCMB & Beats By Dre Presents: The Pinkprint Movie".
- The tenth anniversary edition bonus tracks are inserted at the beginning of the existing track sequence, advancing all subsequent entries by four positions without omitting any original songs.

== Personnel ==
Credits adapted from AllMusic.

=== Performance ===
- Nicki Minaj – primary artist
- Beyoncé – featured artist
- Chris Brown – featured artist
- Drake – featured artist
- Ariana Grande – featured artist
- Skylar Grey – featured artist
- Jeremih – featured artist
- LunchMoney Lewis – featured artist
- Lil Wayne – featured artist
- Meek Mill – featured artist
- Jessie Ware – featured artist
- Parker Ighile – featured artist (uncredited)
- Lukasz Gottwald – vocals
- Theron Thomas – vocals
- Henry Walter – vocals
- Ester Dean – vocals
- Candice Boyd – background vocals
- Katy Perry – background vocals

=== Production ===
- Dwayne Carter – executive producer
- Bryan "Birdman" Williams – executive producer
- Ronald "Slim" Williams – executive producer
- Nicki Minaj – co-executive producer
- A.C.
- Anonymous
- Arch tha Boss
- Boi-1da
- Darhyl "DJ" Camper Jr.
- Cirkut
- Da Internz
- DJ Spydr
- Dr. Luke
- Steve Mostyn
- Keith Harris
- Hit-Boy
- Hitmaka
- Rob Holladay
- Parker Ighile
- Breyan Stanley Isaac
- JMIKE
- Johnny Juliano
- Kane Beatz
- Alex da Kid
- The Mad Violinist
- Metro Boomin
- Mike Will Made-It
- Nineteen85
- Polow da Don
- Allen Ritter
- Sak Pase
- Skooly
- T.O.D.A.Y
- Vinylz
- Pop & Oak
- will.i.am
- Yung Exclusive
- Zaytoven

=== Technical ===
- A.C. – instrumentation, programming
- John Armstrong – recording assistant
- Chris Athens – mastering
- Todd Bergman – engineer, recording assistant
- Boi-1da – instrumentation
- Noel Cadastre – engineer
- Cirkut – instrumentation, programming
- John Cranfield – recording assistant
- Aubry "Big Juice" Delaine – engineer, mixing
- Dr. Luke – instrumentation, programming
- Rachael Findlen – engineer, recording assistant
- Ashanti "The Mad Violinist" Floyd – strings
- Serban Ghenea – mixing
- Clint Gibbs – engineer
- John Hanes – engineer, mixing
- Jaycen Joshua – mixing
- JMIKE – instrumentation, programming
- Dustin Kapulong – recording assistant
- Ryan Kaul – mixing assistant
- Caleb Laven – vocal editing
- Omar Loya – engineer
- Fabian Marasciullo – mixing
- Manny Marroquin – mixing
- Cameron Montgomery – recording assistant
- Irene Richter – production coordination
- Allen Ritter – instrumentation
- Ramon Rivas – recording assistant
- Tim Roberts – mixing assistant
- Phil Seaford – mixing assistant
- Ben Sedano – recording assistant
- Brandon Mr. B Speed – engineer
- Brian Springer – engineer
- Chris Tabron – engineer
- Vinylz – instrumentation
- Stuart White – engineer
- Daniel Zaidenstadt – engineer

== Charts ==
=== Weekly charts ===
Weekly chart performance for The Pinkprint
| Chart (2014–2015) | Peak position |
|---|---|
| Australian Albums (ARIA) | 19 |
| Australian Urban Albums (ARIA) | 2 |
| Belgian Albums (Ultratop Flanders) | 46 |
| Belgian Albums (Ultratop Wallonia) | 87 |
| Canadian Albums (Billboard) | 6 |
| Croatian Albums (HDU) | 11 |
| Danish Albums (Hitlisten) | 21 |
| Dutch Albums (Album Top 100) | 32 |
| French Albums (SNEP) | 70 |
| Finnish Albums (Suomen virallinen lista) | 18 |
| German Albums (Offizielle Top 100) | 69 |
| Greek Albums (IFPI) | 16 |
| Irish Albums (IRMA) | 31 |
| Italian Albums (FIMI) | 100 |
| Japanese Albums (Oricon) | 43 |
| New Zealand Albums (RMNZ) | 21 |
| Norwegian Albums (VG-lista) | 3 |
| Scottish Albums (Official Charts) | 27 |
| South Korean Albums (Gaon) | 77 |
| Spanish Albums (PROMUSICAE) | 76 |
| Swedish Albums (Sverigetopplistan) | 9 |
| Swiss Albums (Schweizer Hitparade) | 39 |
| UK Albums (Official Charts) | 22 |
| UK R&B Albums (OCC) | 1 |
| US Billboard 200 | 2 |
| US Top R&B/Hip-Hop Albums (Billboard) | 1 |

Weekly chart performance for The Pinkprint (Tenth Anniversary Edition)
| Chart (2024) | Peak position |
|---|---|
| Nigerian Albums (TurnTable) | 30 |

=== Year-end charts ===
2015 year-end chart performance for The Pinkprint
| Chart (2015) | Position |
|---|---|
| Canadian Albums (Billboard) | 41 |
| Swedish Albums (Sverigetopplistan) | 37 |
| US Billboard 200 | 7 |
| US Digital Albums (Billboard) | 18 |
| US Top R&B/Hip-Hop Albums (Billboard) | 4 |

2016 year-end chart performance for The Pinkprint
| Chart (2016) | Position |
|---|---|
| US Billboard 200 | 94 |

=== Decade-end charts ===
Decade-end chart performance for The Pinkprint
| Chart (2010–2019) | Position |
|---|---|
| US Billboard 200 | 124 |

== Certifications ==
Certifications and sales for The PinkPrint
| Region | Certification | Certified units/sales |
|---|---|---|
| Australia (ARIA) | Platinum | 70,000^{‡} |
| Brazil (Pro-Música Brasil) (Tenth Anniversary Edition) | 2× Platinum | 80,000^{‡} |
| Canada (Music Canada) | 2× Platinum | 160,000^{‡} |
| Denmark (IFPI Danmark) | Platinum | 20,000^{‡} |
| New Zealand (RMNZ) | 2× Platinum | 30,000^{‡} |
| Poland (ZPAV) | Gold | 10,000^{‡} |
| Sweden (GLF) | Gold | 20,000^{‡} |
| United Kingdom (BPI) | Platinum | 300,000^{‡} |
| United States (RIAA) | 2× Platinum | 2,000,000^{‡} |
^{‡} Sales+streaming figures based on certification alone.

== Release history ==
Release history and formats for The Pinkprint
| Country | Date | Format | Label | Ref. |
|---|---|---|---|---|
| Germany | December 12, 2014 | CD; digital download | Young Money; Cash Money; Republic | |
| United Kingdom | December 15, 2014 | CD; digital download | Young Money; Cash Money; Republic | |
| United States | December 15, 2014 | CD; digital download | Young Money; Cash Money; Republic | |
| Japan | December 24, 2014 | CD | Universal Music Japan | |
| Various | November 22, 2024 | LP | Cash Money | |

== See also ==
- List of Billboard number-one rap albums of 2015
