= The Night Is Still Young (Nicki Minaj song) =

2015 single by Nicki Minaj

Single by Nicki Minaj

from the album The Pinkprint
- Released: April 28, 2015
- Recorded: 2014
- Studio: Eightysevenfourteen Studios (Los Angeles, CA); Glenwood Place Studios (Burbank, CA); Record Plant (Hollywood, CA)
- Genre: Dance-pop; dubstep; pop-rap
- Length: 3:48
- Label: Young Money; Cash Money; Republic
- Songwriters: Onika Maraj; Lukasz Gottwald; Henry Walter; Ester Dean; Donnie Lewis; Theron Thomas
- Producers: Dr. Luke; Cirkut

Nicki Minaj singles chronology
"Hey Mama" (2015)	"The Night Is Still Young" (2015)	"Bitch I'm Madonna" (2015)

Music video
- "Night Is Still Young" on YouTube

"The Night Is Still Young" is a song recorded by rapper Nicki Minaj, released as the sixth single from her third album The Pinkprint (2014), by Cash Money and Republic. It was written by Minaj, Ester Dean, Theron Thomas and Cirkut; and produced by Cirkut. It is a dance-pop and dubstep-pop song.

Many critics viewed the song as single material and commended the production, but criticized the composition and lyrical content. The song debuted at number 93 on the Billboard Hot 100, and reached number 31. The single was certified platinum by the RIAA for selling 1,000,000 units.

== Composition ==
"The Night is Still Young" is written by Minaj, Ester Dean, Lukasz Gottwald, Donnie Lewis, Theron Thomas and Henry Walter, with additional production by Gottwald and Cirkut. Lyrically, the song is about partying and having fun; the verses revolve around a routine night out at a club. Writing for Consequence of Sound, Michael Madden felt the composition was "unadulterated pop." Garvey compared the composition to Minaj's tracks on her second studio album, Pink Friday: Roman Reloaded. Tyler Kane from Paste Magazine commented "[The Night is Still Young”] sounded like a song hand-penned for Ke$ha, so it wasn't a surprise to discover the person behind the track was her estranged collaborator Dr. Luke, reigning king of themes like “tonight is the last night we will exist in human form, so let’s party it away at the club.” Nick Levine from Time Out labelled it "digital disco" music. Niki McGloster from Billboard said it was the "lovechild" of Minaj's 2010 single "Moment 4 Life" and her 2012 single "Starships". Shee commented "Minaj packs this club record with verses about seizing the night and enjoying the ride." "The Night Is Still Young" is written in the key of C♯ minor with a tempo of 124 beats per minute, and Minaj's vocals range from C♯3 to C♯5.

== Release ==
Preparing for her world tour, Minaj's label Young Money Entertainment and Cash Money Records released the fifth single "Truffle Butter" from the parent album in January 2015 due to heavy airplay. Originally, Republic Records wanted to release "The Night is Still Young" as the next single but after agreement with Young Money and Cash Money, they scrapped it as the fifth single

Young Money and Cash Money intended to commission a music video for "Truffle Butter" to promote it, however, Republic refused because plans for "The Night is Still Young" had been set. The single was released in the UK on April 6 through contemporary radio. It was officially sent to contemporary radio in the US on April 28, 2015. The official cover was released via Minaj's Instagram, on May 16, 2015.

== Critical reception ==
Stereogum’s writer Tom Briehan found the lyrics and Minaj's input as "bland" and "character-free." Madden felt the songwriting was "plain" but commented "melodically, it does sound like the soundtrack to a massive evening, especially once that second vocal track kicks in during the chorus [...]" The Rolling Stone's Jon Dolan favored the track, calling it "victory lap-pop." Levine said that the song "proves Minaj still knows how to party." However, Katherine St. Asaph from Time Magazine was heavily critical on Dr. Luke's production on both this and "Only". She commented "They’re not only unwelcome — they feel tired, as if they’d have been dated years ago. They’re necessary intrusions of commercialism that belie [Minaj’s] claim she ‘ain’t gotta rely on top 40’ and undermine what's presumably meant to be a classic." McGloster favored the song as single-worthy by commenting "It's safe to say she'll be adding this to her vast collection of chart-topping hits."

Despite calling it "catchy pop", Jon Caramanica from The New York Times felt the song was a "poor fit" to the album. Paste Magazine's Tyler Kane criticized the song's inclusion to the album, alongside album tracks "I Lied" and "Bed of Lies". He refereed the songs by saying "There’s a lot to wade through, though, and for every good moment, there’s another that should have ended on the cutting room floor." Alex Macpherson from The Guardian commented "This perfunctory nod to that style is like revisiting the sites of your drunkenness through a hungover fug the following night in a doomed attempt to recapture the magic. No one’s heart is in this, [...]" Breihan criticized the composition, feeling that Minaj " doesn’t always understand what she’s good at." He concluded "There’s subtext, sure, but the subtext doesn’t stop the song from being boring bottle-service music."

== Music video ==
During her interview with reporters from Capital FM, Minaj confirmed that she would appear in the single's accompanying music video. The music video was shot in Downtown Los Angeles, California in March 2015.

A lyric video was published on Minaj's Vevo account, featuring visuals of drinking and colorful lights. Madeline Roth from MTV praised the visuals of the lyric video, commenting "The clip gives the song a kaleidoscopic visual treatment that’s bursting with electric colors as Nicki assures us, “the night is still young and so are we.” She also felt the song was "catchy." The music video (directed by Hannah Lux Davis) was released on May 22, 2015, on Tidal. On May 26, 2015, the video was uploaded to Minaj's Vevo.

== Live performances ==
Minaj has performed the song on her third world tour The Pinkprint Tour in 2015. The song was in the segment of "dance bangers" alongside her collaboration single "Turn Me On" with French disc jockey David Guetta and her single "Starships". Levine, reporting the publication NME, commented "Ending with a succession of dance bangers including her David Guetta EDM hit 'Turn Me On', underrated 'The Pinkprint' cut 'The Night Is Still Young' and a gloriously raucous 'Starships', Nicki has 20,000 people raising their hands to the line 'We're higher than a motherf**ker', and this vast arena feels like a New York basement sweatbox." She also performed the song at the 2015 Billboard Music Awards. On May 30, 2015, Minaj performed the song on the iHeartRadio Summer Pool Party 2015 in Las Vegas. On July 24, 2015, Minaj performed the song on Good Morning America's Summer Concert Series. Minaj also opened the 2015 MTV Video Music Awards with a performance of "Trini Dem Girls", followed by a performance of "The Night Is Still Young" and "Bad Blood" with Taylor Swift.

== Charts ==
=== Weekly charts ===
Weekly chart performance for "The Night Is Still Young"
Chart (2015)	Peak; position
Belgium Urban (Ultratop Flanders)	44
Canada Hot 100 (Billboard)	40
Canada CHR/Top 40 (Billboard)	32
CIS Airplay (TopHit)	171
Czech Republic Airplay (ČNS IFPI)	63
Czech Republic Singles Digital (ČNS IFPI)	43
Israel (Media Forest TV Airplay)	4
Ireland (IRMA)	98
Slovakia Airplay (ČNS IFPI)	71
Slovakia Singles Digital (ČNS IFPI)	43
Sweden (Sverigetopplistan)	93
UK Audio Streaming (Official Charts)	78
UK Hip Hop/R&B (Official Charts)	23
US Billboard Hot 100	31
US Hot Rap Songs (Billboard)	6
US Dance Airplay (Billboard)	17
US Pop Airplay (Billboard)	14
US Rhythmic Airplay (Billboard)	14

== Certifications ==
Certifications for "The Night Is Still Young"
Region	Certification	Certified units/sales
Australia (ARIA)	Platinum	70,000^{‡}
Brazil (Pro-Música Brasil)	Platinum	60,000^{‡}
New Zealand (RMNZ)	Platinum	30,000^{‡}
Sweden (GLF)	Gold	20,000^{‡}
United Kingdom (BPI)	Gold	400,000^{‡}
United States (RIAA)	Platinum	1,000,000^{‡}
^{‡} Sales+streaming figures based on certification alone.

== Release history ==
Release dates for "The Night Is Still Young"
Region	Date	Format	Label
Russia	February 18, 2015	Contemporary hit radio	Young Money; Cash Money; Republic
United Kingdom	April 6, 2015	Contemporary hit radio	Young Money; Cash Money; Republic
United States	April 28, 2015	Mainstream radio	Young Money; Cash Money; Republic
United States	April 28, 2015	Rhythmic radio	Young Money; Cash Money; Republic
