= Whip It! (song) =

Single by LunchMoney Lewis featuring Chloe Angelides
- Released: August 7, 2015
- Genre: Rap
- Length: 4:02
- Label: Kemosabe; Columbia
- Songwriters: Gamal Lewis; Chloe Angelides; Nathan Cunningham; Marc Sibley; Lukasz Gottwald; Henry Walter; Jacob Kasher Hindlin; Reggie Andrews; Leon Ndugu Chancler
- Producers: Space Primates; Dr. Luke; Cirkut

LunchMoney Lewis singles chronology
"Bills" (2015)	"Whip It!" (2015)	"Trini Dem Girls" (2015)

Music video
- "Whip It!" on YouTube

"Whip It!" is a single by American rapper LunchMoney Lewis featuring American singer Chloe Angelides. It was released on August 7, 2015. The song contains samples from the 1980s song, "Let It Whip" by the Dazz Band.

== Background ==
The song samples Dazz Band's "Let It Whip". Space Primates brought the initial track idea with the sample flip to Dr. Luke who then sent it to Lunchmoney. Lunchmoney discussed the song's conception: "The ‘let it whip, child’… [...] It was a real uptempo disco song. When I heard the sample, it really drove me to it and I was thinking, ‘this is funky… I like it’. And I wrote some verses, played it to Dr. Luke and he really liked it. Then we got in Chloe Angelides; she’s an awesome songwriter with a crazy voice."

== Music video ==
On August 19, 2015, the lyric video premiered on YouTube. The video features a bunch of women walking and skating around the city and the beach. Two other videos were posted to YouTube; an audio video, and an official music video. As of May 2017, the three videos have a combined 9 million views on YouTube.

On September 15, the music video premiered. It features LunchMoney in a suit performing the song on a 1970s variety show, with Angelides singing behind him and dancers on the stage.

== Charts ==
=== Weekly charts ===
Chart (2015)	Peak position
Australia (ARIA)	11
Austria (Ö3 Austria Top 40)	72
Belgium (Ultratip Bubbling Under Wallonia)	4
Germany (GfK)	23
New Zealand Heatseekers (Recorded Music NZ)	6
Slovenia (SloTop50)	34
Sweden Heatseeker (Sverigetopplistan)	14
UK Singles (OCC)	168

=== Year-end charts ===
Chart (2015)	Position
Australia (ARIA)	64

== Certifications ==
Region	Certification	Certified units/sales
Australia (ARIA)	2× Platinum	140,000^{‡}
Germany (BVMI)	Gold	200,000^{‡}
^{‡} Sales+streaming figures based on certification alone.
