= Only (Nicki Minaj song) =

2014 single by Nicki Minaj

Single by Nicki Minaj featuring Drake, Lil Wayne and Chris Brown

from the album The Pinkprint
- Released: October 28, 2014
- Recorded: 2014
- Studio: Eightysevenfourteen Studios (Los Angeles, CA); Glenwood Place Studios (Burbank, CA); Evdon Studios (Toronto, ON); Jungle City Studios (New York, NY); Record Plant (Hollywood, CA)
- Genre: Hardcore rap
- Length: 5:12; 4:59 (album edit – international deluxe)
- Label: Young Money; Cash Money; Republic
- Songwriters: Onika Maraj; Aubrey Graham; Dwayne Carter; Jeremy Coleman; Lukasz Gottwald; Theron Thomas; Timothy Thomas; Henry Walter
- Producers: Dr. Luke; Cirkut; JMIKE

Nicki Minaj singles chronology
| "Touchin, Lovin" (2014) | "Only" (2014) | "Bed of Lies" (2014) |

Chris Brown singles chronology
| "Hold You Down" (2014) | "Only" (2014) | "Post to Be" (2014) |

Drake singles chronology
| "Tuesday" (2014) | "Only" (2014) | "Truffle Butter" (2015) |

Lil Wayne singles chronology
| "Grindin" (2014) | "Only" (2014) | "Start a Fire" (2014) |

Music video
- "Only" on YouTube

"Only" is a song by Trinidadian-born rapper Nicki Minaj featuring Canadian rapper Drake, and American rappers Lil Wayne and Chris Brown, from her third album, The Pinkprint (2014). It was released on October 28, 2014, by Young Money Entertainment, Cash Money Records, and Republic Records as the third single from the album. The rappers wrote the song with producers Dr. Luke, Cirkut, and JMIKE, with production assistance from HBM and Rock City. "Only" is a hip-hop song that contains an "icy" production that sits "ominously" underneath dirty lyrical metaphors.

"Only" peaked at number 12 on the US Billboard Hot 100 and number one on the US Hot R&B/Hip-Hop Songs chart, giving Nicki Minaj her fourth number one on the latter chart and making her the first female rap artist to do so. The song was certified triple platinum by the Recording Industry Association of America (RIAA). The song received a nomination for Best Rap/Sung Collaboration at the 58th Grammy Awards.

Both a lyric video and an official video were released to promote the song. The lyric video was released in November 2014, premiering close to the 25th anniversary of the fall of the Berlin Wall, with visualizations inspired by the Nazi regime of Germany and the work of Leni Riefenstahl. There was immediate backlash from fans, calling the video antisemitic and insensitive, although Nicki Minaj stated she was not involved in the production of the lyric video and said she regrets not overseeing it before it was posted to YouTube. The song's accompanying music video, released the following month and directed by Hannah Lux Davis, premiered on December 12, 2014.

== Background and release ==
During an interview with Capital Xtra in June 2013, Minaj stated that she hoped Drake would appear on the album continuing to say "We're supposed to meet up this week to get some stuff crack-a-ling in the studio. I think there'll be another feature on the album that will blow people away. I'm super excited about that too, but it's obviously a secret!". On October 26, 2014, Minaj posted the single cover on Instagram, informing fans that this would be the third single off her upcoming album The Pinkprint. The cover art for the song was an illustration that depicts Minaj in a superhero catsuit, Drake as the pope, and Lil Wayne in a suit and tie. "Only" was released for digital download as the third single from the album on October 28, 2014.

== Recording ==
Speaking to Revolt in November 2019, Minaj's sound engineer Big Juice recalled how Minaj reacted after she received Chris Brown's vocals for the chorus: "I remember when we did 'Only' and got the Chris Brown vocals back for that. She [Minaj] was jumping up and screaming, 'This is a fucking hit'."

== Reception ==
=== Critical reception ===
"Only"
A 29-second sample of "Only" by Nicki Minaj featuring Drake, Lil Wayne and Chris Brown, where the chorus and part of Drake's verse is heard.

Carolyn Menyes from Music Times gave the song a positive review, saying "With a cool sense of confidence and rhymes that boast of her own sexual and rapping prowess, Minaj is taking the reins, leading into the equally vulgar and explosive rap verses from Drake and Wayne". Brennan Carley from Spin said ""Only" is Nicki at her dirtiest and smartest, rapping with metaphors that'd fly over other rappers' heads while keeping the glint of a knowing wink always in her eye." Miles Raymer from EW praised Minaj's rap and called it the best part of the song.

Chris Coplan from Consequence of Sound said although it wasn't the strongest effort from the three, the song was "a great display of how their separate and distinct personalities can still play off one another nicely". Drew Millard from Noisey praised Lil Wayne's verse and said "Minaj continues to rap laps around the competition and there's no indication that that's going to change any time soon". Matthew Trammell of The Fader gave the song a negative review, saying Minaj delivers "sleepy lines" and comes off "a bit desperate".

=== Commercial performance ===
"Only" debuted at number 54 on the US Billboard Hot 100, and peaked at number 12 on the chart. On the week ending December 14, 2014 the song rose from number ten to one on the Hot R&B/Hip-Hop Songs chart, giving the artist her fourth number one, in doing so Minaj became the only female rap artist to score four number ones on the chart. Minaj surpassed Missy Elliott who scored three. The song also gave Drake his twelfth number one, Lil Wayne his ninth and Chris Brown his fifth. On August 17, 2015, "Only" was certified 3× Platinum in the United States. As of June 2016, the song has sold 1,471,110 copies in the United States.

== Lyric video ==
Minaj released a lyric music video for the song in early November 2014, premiering close to the 25th anniversary of the fall of the Berlin Wall, with visualisations inspired by the Nazi Regime and the work of Leni Riefenstahl. There was immediate backlash from fans, calling the video anti-semitic and insensitive. Many fans expressed their outrage on social media websites like Twitter and Tumblr.

BuzzFeed detailed the video, created by Jeff Osborne: "Nicki is depicted as a powerful military leader in charge of an army that look suspiciously like a bunch SS officers. Red flags that feature a distorted, swastika-looking version of her initials are featured throughout the video. There's a Nuremberg-esque parking lot for her tanks. And her soldiers are shown wearing Nazi-esque armbands." Osborne was inspired by conspiracy theorist Alex Jones in his creation of the video. Gawker pointed out that although Minaj is not the first entertainer to derive inspiration from Nazi imagery, "generally artists have refrained from using comparisons to Hitler's regime as a compliment." Guest-rapper Drake, who is Jewish, was also criticized for his involvement in the video.

Minaj later issued a statement on the video via her Twitter account, "I didn't come up with the concept, but I'm very sorry and take full responsibility if it has offended anyone. I'd never condone Nazism in my art," also citing that her producer is Jewish. The artist behind the video, Jeff Osborne, refused to apologize for the video, confirming that the imagery used was indeed inspired by Nazism: "...if my work is misinterpreted because it's not a sappy tearjerker, sorry I'm not sorry." Neither Nicki Minaj nor Osborne responded to criticism that the video was released on the anniversary of Kristallnacht. Nicki Minaj tweeted that Osborne was influenced by the Metalocalypse Dethklok music video for "The Gears" as well as Sin City when creating the music video. Brandon Small, creator of Metalocalypse responded to the comparison, stating that "They seem to be confused about art" before deconstructing the meaning behind both videos. He also added that he does not believe Nicki Minaj had poor intentions.

== Music video ==
The accompanying music video for "Only", directed by Hannah Lux Davis, premiered on December 12, 2014. The video opens with an injured man lying on the floor in what appears to be a chamber. He is then taken to a room where many other tortured men are tied up in a room. The video then cuts to Minaj who is wearing black-feathered lingerie. She raps, wearing a sheer getup and sky-high platform heels. Minaj and Drake stand side by side while Minaj dons what looks like a black lace wedding veil. Minaj, Wayne, and Drake stand in a run-down dungeon as Minaj continues to sing. While Chris Brown’s part of the song was filmed at a different location due to schedule conflicts, he also appears in the video as he sings the chorus.

The video features cameo appearances from DJ Khaled and Birdman, among others.

The music video for "Only" was awarded with the Coca-Cola Viewers' Choice Awards for Best Video at the 2015 BET Awards. This was an award in which fans voted online.

Following the sadomasochistic and suggestives scenes, the dark themes of the video and violent images, the music video was immediately broadcast in France after 10 p.m. with a warning Not advised for children under 10 years old or 12 years old or without warning (depending on the music channels).

== Live performances ==
On December 6, 2014, Minaj first performed the song on Saturday Night Live. The rapper also performed the song during The Pinkprint Tour. On May 30, 2015, she also performed the song on the iHeartRadio Summer Pool Party 2015 in Las Vegas.

== Charts ==
=== Weekly charts ===
| Chart (2014–2015) | Peak position |
|---|---|
| Australia (ARIA) | 62 |
| Australian Urban (ARIA) | 9 |
| Belgium (Ultratip Bubbling Under Flanders) | 39 |
| Belgium Urban (Ultratop Flanders) | 14 |
| Belgium (Ultratip Bubbling Under Wallonia) | 34 |
| Canada Hot 100 (Billboard) | 20 |
| France (SNEP) | 102 |
| Netherlands (Single Tip) | 20 |
| Scottish Singles Sales (Official Charts) | 36 |
| UK Singles (Official Charts) | 35 |
| UK Hip Hop/R&B (Official Charts) | 4 |
| US Billboard Hot 100 | 12 |
| US Hot R&B/Hip-Hop Songs (Billboard) | 1 |
| US R&B/Hip-Hop Airplay (Billboard) | 2 |
| US Rhythmic Airplay (Billboard) | 6 |

=== Year-end charts ===
| Chart (2015) | Position |
|---|---|
| US Billboard Hot 100 | 51 |
| US Hot R&B/Hip-Hop Songs (Billboard) | 16 |
| US Rhythmic (Billboard) | 35 |

== Certifications ==
Certifications for "Only"
| Region | Certification | Certified units/sales |
|---|---|---|
| Australia (ARIA) | 3× Platinum | 210,000^{‡} |
| Brazil (Pro-Música Brasil) | Platinum | 60,000^{‡} |
| New Zealand (RMNZ) | 2× Platinum | 60,000^{‡} |
| United Kingdom (BPI) | Platinum | 600,000^{‡} |
| United States (RIAA) | 3× Platinum | 3,000,000 |
^{‡} Sales+streaming figures based on certification alone.

== Release history ==
| Country | Date | Format | Label |
|---|---|---|---|
| United States | October 28, 2014 | Digital download | Young Money; Cash Money; Republic |
| United States | November 4, 2014 | Rhythmic radio | Young Money; Cash Money; Republic |
| United States | November 4, 2014 | Urban radio | Young Money; Cash Money; Republic |

== See also ==
- List of number-one R&B/hip-hop songs of 2014 (U.S.)
