= Start a Fire (Lil Wayne song) =

Single by Lil Wayne featuring Christina Milian
- Released: November 24, 2014
- Recorded: 2014
- Genre: R&B; hip hop
- Length: 3:55
- Label: Young Money; Cash Money; Republic
- Songwriter(s): Dwayne Carter; Christine Flores

Lil Wayne singles chronology
"Only" (2014)	"Start a Fire" (2014)	"Truffle Butter" (2015)

Christina Milian singles chronology
"Hello" (2012)	"Start a Fire" (2014)

"Start a Fire" is a song by American rapper Lil Wayne featuring American singer Christina Milian. It was released on November 24, 2014 by Young Money Entertainment, Cash Money Records and Republic Records.

== Release and promotion ==
The song was released on November 24, 2014 on iTunes. The song was also released on Spotify, make it available to stream online. One day before the release date, Lil Wayne premiered the single at 42nd American Music Awards ceremony with Christina Milian.

== Live performance ==
As Lil Wayne promoted the single, he performed the song at 42nd American Music Awards with Christina Milian. On YouTube, there is a video of the performing of Lil Wayne and Christina Milian at 42nd AMA and available worldwide.

== Charts ==
Chart (2014)	Peak position
US Bubbling Under R&B/Hip-Hop Singles (Billboard)	10
