= All Things Go =

Promotional single by Nicki Minaj

from the album The Pinkprint
- Released: December 3, 2014
- Recorded: 2014
- Studio: Glenwood Place Studios (Burbank, CA)
- Genre: Hip hop • emo-rap
- Length: 4:53; 4:04 (album edit – international deluxe)
- Label: Young Money; Cash Money; Republic
- Songwriters: Onika Maraj; Matthew Samuels; Ester Dean; Anderson Hernandez; Allen Ritter
- Producers: Boi-1da; Vinylz; Ritter

Audio video
- "All Things Go" on YouTube

"All Things Go" is a song by rapper Nicki Minaj from her third album, The Pinkprint (2014). It was released on December 3, 2014, by Young Money, Cash Money, and Republic Records as the first promotional single and opening track from the album. The song peaked at number 38 on the US Billboard Hot R&B/Hip-Hop Songs chart.

== Composition ==
For Time contributor Eliza Berman, "All Things Go" features lyrics that discuss a wide range of personal challenges Minaj has faced, ranging from strained relationships with her family to the murder of her cousin Nicholas Telemaque in 2011. The song opens with Minaj reflecting on fame and the speed in which her life has moved; "Life is a movie, there'll never be a sequel."

In the following verse Minaj sings about her cousin's death and how she could have helped him if she had let him stay with her saying; "I'll pop a pill and remember the look in his eyes the last day he saw me." The final verse sees Minaj address motherhood, ranging from her relationship with her mother and her brother, to a reference to abortion.

== Critical reception ==
Niki McGloster from Billboard commented that the track was "the most razor-sharp emotionally and most cathartic album cut, it's a great indicator of her newfound musical maturity".

== Live performances ==
On December 6, 2014, Minaj first performed the song on Saturday Night Live.

The song was included on the setlist of The Pinkprint Tour which commenced on March 16, 2015, and ended on August 23, 2015.

At the 2022 MTV Video Music Awards, Minaj performed the song as part of her Michael Jackson Video Vanguard Award Medley.
