= Chloe Angelides =

American singer, songwriter and producer

- Born: Chloe Angelides; May 21, 1992 (age 34); Reston, Virginia, U.S.
- Genres: Pop
- Occupations: Singer; songwriter; producer
- Instruments: Vocals
- Years active: 2013–present

Chloe Angelides (born May 21, 1992) is an American singer, songwriter, and producer. She has written songs such as "Zipper" for Jason Derulo for his album Talk Dirty, "Jackie (B.M.F.)" for Ciara for her album Jackie, "Burnin' Up" for Jessie J, "Pacify Her" by Melanie Martinez for her album Cry Baby, "Say Love" by JoJo for her EP III, "Paper" by Nick & Knight, "Sober" by Selena Gomez for her album Revival, "Get On Your Knees" by Nicki Minaj and has performed vocals on "Sexy Beaches" for Pitbull on his album Globalization, "Whip It!" by LunchMoney Lewis, "Ready for Love" by Felix Cartal, "How Bad You Want It (Oh Yeah)" by Sevyn Streeter and "White Lies" by Vicetone. Angelides is signed to Dr. Luke's production company Prescription Songs.

== Discography ==
=== As featured artist ===
- 2013: "Survivor" (Stephen Swartz featuring Chloe Angelides)
- 2014: "Sexy Beaches" (Pitbull featuring Chloe Angelides)
- 2014: "White Lies" (Vicetone featuring Chloe Angelides)
- 2014: "Ready for Love" (Felix Cartal featuring Chloe Angelides)
- 2015: "Whip It!" (LunchMoney Lewis featuring Chloe Angelides)
- 2015: "Make Up" (R. City featuring Chloe Angelides)
- 2019: "Hard To Say Goodbye" (Ekali and Illenium featuring Chloe Angelides)

=== Other ===
- 2013: "Crash" (Adventure Club) (Uncredited as singer)
- 2017: "Under Your Skin (SeeB & R. City) (Uncredited as singer)

=== Songwriter and production credits ===
Song	Year	Artist	Album	Label
"Zipper"	2014	Jason Derulo	Talk Dirty	Atlantic
"Burnin' Up"	2014	Jessie J	Sweet Talker	Lava; Republic
"Get on Your Knees"	2014	Nicki Minaj	The Pinkprint	Young Money; Cash Money; Republic
"Sexy Beaches"	2014	Pitbull	Globalization	Mr. 305; Polo Grounds; RCA
"How Bad You Want It (Oh Yeah)"	2015	Sevyn Streeter	Furious 7: Original Motion Picture Soundtrack	Atlantic
"Pacify Her"	2015	Melanie Martinez	Cry Baby	Atlantic
"Jackie (B.M.F.)"	2015	Ciara	Jackie	Epic
"Say Love"	2015	JoJo	III	Atlantic
"Ready for Love"	2015	Felix Cartal	Credits	Dim Mak
"Player"	2015	Tinashe	Single	RCA
"Whip It!"	2015	LunchMoney Lewis	Bills	Kemosabe; Columbia
"Sober"	2015	Selena Gomez	Revival	Interscope
"Cologne"	2015	Selena Gomez	Revival	Interscope
"Make Up"	2015	R. City	What Dreams Are Made Of	Kemosabe; RCA
"Thinking Bout You"	2016	Ariana Grande	Dangerous Woman	Republic
"Love of My Life"	2016	Daya	Sit Still, Look Pretty	RED
"Tornado"	2017	Lea Michele	Places	Columbia
"Letting Go"	2017	Lea Michele	Places	Columbia
"Fetish"	2017	Selena Gomez	Non-album single	Interscope
"You Don't Do It For Me Anymore"	2017	Demi Lovato	Tell Me You Love Me	Island; Hollywood; Safehouse
"Ruin the Friendship"	2017	Demi Lovato	Tell Me You Love Me	Island; Hollywood; Safehouse
"Cry Baby"	2017	Demi Lovato	Tell Me You Love Me	Island; Hollywood; Safehouse
"Let It Be"	2018	Hayley Kiyoko	Expectations	Atlantic; Empire
"Blank Marquee"	2019	Yuna	Rouge	Verve Forecast; UMG
"Take You Back"	2019	Sabrina Carpenter	Singular: Act II	Hollywood
"Waste"	2019	Dove Cameron	Non-album single	Disruptor; Columbia
"Cut You Off"	2020	Selena Gomez	Rare	Interscope
"Still Have Me"	2020	Demi Lovato	Non-album single	Island
"Soppposed To Be"	2022	Hayley Kiyoko	Panorama	Atlantic; Empire
"Woman's World"	2024	Katy Perry	143	Capitol
"Gorgeous"	2024	Katy Perry	143	Capitol
"Artificial"	2024	Katy Perry	143	Capitol
"Cherry Sky"	2025	Minnie	Her	Cube Entertainment
"Fast"	2025	Demi Lovato	TBA	Island
"The Things That I Would Do To Be Enough For You"	2026	Isabel LaRosa	Promising Young Woman	RCA
