= SummerThing! =

Single by Afrojack featuring Mike Taylor
- Released: 21 June 2015
- Recorded: 2014
- Genre: EDM
- Length: 3:55
- Label: Def Jam Recordings
- Songwriters: Afrojack, Mike Taylor, James Wong
- Producer: Afrojack

Afrojack singles chronology
"Hey Mama" (2015)	"SummerThing!" (2015)	"Unstoppable" (2015)

"SummerThing!" is a 2015 song by Afrojack featuring vocals by Mike Taylor. It has charted in the Netherlands, Austria, the Flanders region of Belgium, France and on assorted American charts including the Hot Dance/Electronic Songs. The song was used in a McDonald's advert.

== Background ==
"SummerThing!" was written by Afrojack, Mike Taylor and James Wong and was performed by Afrojack and Mike Taylor. It was premiered on the Saturday Night Online radio show on 20 June 2015 and released on iTunes on 21 June 2015, with a subsequent remix with additional vocals by Pitbull also being dropped on Saturday Night Online on 22 August 2015.

== Music video ==
A music video was produced for the song. It premiered on 3 August 2015 and interchanges between clips of Afrojack and Taylor singing to the track and a gradually increasing assortment of what starts off as young people but ends including a dwarf and an old person in a straw hat enjoying the facilities of an inflatable slide, a pool and a bus in a desert town in Western America. It ends with a couple getting married and driving off in a convertible filled with water.

== Chart performance ==
"SummerThing!" has charted at number 8 on the Hot Dance/Electronic Songs, shifting 8,000 downloads and 679,000 streams in America that week. It has also peaked at number 25 on the Dutch Singles Chart, number 70 on the Austrian Singles Chart, number 17 on the Netherlands Singles Chart, number 8 on the French Singles Chart, number 65 on the Swedish Singles Chart, number 72 on the Japan Hot 100 Singles and number 27 on the Mainstream Top 40.

== Critical reception ==
John Cameron of We've Got This Covered noted that the song's first drop "clashes significantly with Mike Taylor's sing-songy lyrics, driving the point home that sometimes an artist just needs to be comfortable with who they are and not stretch out their creative process too much if they don't have the time to do it right".

== In popular culture ==
In the summer of 2015, McDonalds used the song on its TV ad, advertising its Double Combo that costed only $2.50.

== Charts ==
=== Weekly charts ===
Chart (2015)	Peak position
Austria (Ö3 Austria Top 40)	70
Belgium (Ultratip Bubbling Under Flanders)	17
Belgium Dance (Ultratop Flanders)	19
Belgium Dance Bubbling Under (Ultratop Flanders)	2
Belgium (Ultratip Bubbling Under Wallonia)	8
Belgium Dance (Ultratop Wallonia)	43
Belgium Dance Bubbling Under (Ultratop Wallonia)	1
Japan Hot 100 (Billboard)	72
Netherlands (Dutch Top 40)	13
Netherlands (Single Top 100)	25
Sweden (Sverigetopplistan)	65
US Bubbling Under Hot 100 (Billboard)	108
US Dance Club Songs (Billboard)	3
US Hot Dance/Electronic Songs (Billboard)	8
US Pop Airplay (Billboard)	27

=== Year-end charts ===
Chart (2015)	Position
Netherlands (Dutch Top 40)	69
Netherlands (NPO 3FM)	82
US Hot Dance/Electronic Songs (Billboard)	32

== Certifications ==
Region	Certification	Certified units/sales
Sweden (GLF)	Gold	20,000^{‡}
^{‡} Sales+streaming figures based on certification alone.
