= Pills n Potions =

"Pills N Potions"

Single by Nicki Minaj

from the album The Pinkprint
- Released: May 21, 2014
- Recorded: 2013–2014
- Studio: Luke's in the Boo (Malibu, California); Record Plant (Hollywood)
- Genre: Pop; hip hop
- Length: 4:28
- Label: Young Money; Cash Money; Republic
- Songwriters: Onika Maraj; Lukasz Gottwald; Ester Dean; Henry Walter
- Producers: Dr. Luke; Cirkut

Nicki Minaj singles chronology
"Lookin Ass" (2014)	"Pills N Potions" (2014)	"She Came to Give It to You" (2014)

"Pills N Potions" is a song by rapper Nicki Minaj from her third studio album, The Pinkprint (2014). It was released as the album's lead single on May 21, 2014, by Young Money, Cash Money, and Republic. The song was written by Minaj, Ester Dean, and producers Cirkut and Dr. Luke.

Pills N Potions peaked at number 24 on the US Billboard Hot 100 and within the top 40 in Australia, Ireland, New Zealand and the United Kingdom. Its music video was directed by Diane Martel, and was released on June 9, 2014. Minaj promoted the song by performing it live at the BET Awards 2014.

== Background and release ==
"What that felt like to me was forgiveness, you know, and just understanding that everybody gets mad, but when you love somebody, I feel like you'll always love them. I don't feel like there's ever been somebody that I loved that I no longer love, I just may not be able to live with you or have you in my life, and that's really what the song is about."

— Minaj describing the concept behind "Pills N Potions".

Minaj first mentioned the song in her promo single, "Yasss Bish" which features Soulja Boy. She stated that the single would be released in two weeks. She revealed the title of the song at the 2014 Billboard Music Awards and afterwards hosted a Q&A on Twitter where she revealed information regarding the single. In an interview for Rap-Up, she stated that "Pills N Potions" was "uplifting" and "very soulful". Speaking to Billboard, she explained: "It sounds like urgency, It sounds like betrayal. It sounds like running. It sounds like fainting. It sounds like love. It sounds like – *gasp!*" On May 19, 2014, Minaj revealed the single's cover art on Instagram.

On May 24, 2014, Minaj premiered "Pills N Potions" on SoundCloud, with song being available for purchase on iTunes later that day. She promoted the single by means of several radio interviews throughout the United States, including Power 105.1's The Breakfast Club, KIIS-FM's On Air with Ryan Seacrest, Hot 97's morning show, Z100 with Elvis Duran and the Morning Show and a sit down interview for Power 106's The Big Boy's Neighborhood Morning Show.

== Composition ==
"Pills N Potions"
A 26-second sample of the song's chorus.

"Pills N Potions" is a pop and hip hop piano ballad "framed in the druggy imagery of mixtape rap". Chris Payne of Billboard said the song coupled a chorus "reminiscent of a Rihanna ballad" with rapped verses. Kory Grow of Rolling Stone opined that the song shows Minaj "sublimely (and maturely) rising above her detractors, even singing that she still loves them."

The song opens with a sparse, haunting drum beat, while Minaj sings the pre-chorus in a feather-like near-whisper, "Pills 'n potions, we're overdosin'/I'm angry but I still love you". As the pre-chorus repeats, an echo effect is added to her vocals, and "blooming" chants of "I still love, I still love, I still lu-uh-uhhhv" are sung to create the song's chorus. During the verses Minaj raps with a sense of urgency, however, the first verse is kept restrained as she raps about someone who wronged her, "They could never make me hate you/Even though what you was doin' wasn't tasteful/Even though you out here looking so ungrateful/I'mma keep it movin' be classy and graceful." She later says that she'll "forgive and forget", but knows that they're jealous of her success: "But I spin off in a Benzie/I see the envy when I'm causin' a frenzy".

== Critical reception ==
Zach Frydenlund of Complex called "Pills N Potions" a "monster of a song", and explained, "Nicki shows—once again—how she can delicately balance pop and hip-hop, while spitting true to her 'real rap' promise to fans". Chris Payne of Billboard felt Minaj was sincere in her delivery of the song's personal lyrics, and went on to call it a "crowd pleaser" with something for every listener to enjoy. Gil Kaufman of MTV News wrote that the song was "actually a huge move back into the pop game, setting Minaj up for what could be her biggest cross-over hit to date". Although Marc Hogan of Spin found the song's message confusing, but praised Minaj's rapping and said: "when we hear that Rihanna-like 'I still lo-uh-uh-ve' hook blasting out of car windows this summer? We'll probably still lo-uh-uh-ve it." Kory Grow of Rolling Stone noted that "Pills N Potions" was the "diametric opposite" of Minaj's previous single, "Lookin Ass". XXL featured the song on their mid-year list of 25 Best Songs of 2014 (So Far), commenting that "despite the slow tempo of the song, Nicki was still able to supply her classic witty lines with a hard undertone". In contrast, Meaghan Garvey of Pitchfork described "Pills N Potions" as "cute but hollow, its sentimentality trumped by the album's deeply personal opening triptych."

== Music video ==
The music video for "Pills N Potions" was released on June 9, 2014, on YouTube. American rapper The Game makes a cameo appearance.

== Commercial performance ==
In the United States, "Pills N Potions" debuted at number 47 on the Billboard Hot 100 for the week ending June 7, 2014; it sold 84,000 copies and amassed 709,000 domestic streams within its first four days of release. The song went on to peak at number 24 on the chart. As of December 2014, the song has sold 622,000 copies in the United States.

== Charts ==
=== Weekly charts ===
Chart (2014)	Peak position
Australia (ARIA)	14
Australia Urban (ARIA)	3
Belgium (Ultratip Bubbling Under Flanders)	14
Belgium Urban (Ultratop Flanders)	13
Belgium (Ultratip Bubbling Under Wallonia)	8
Canada Hot 100 (Billboard)	53
France (SNEP)	71
France Airplay (SNEP)	52
Germany (GfK)	39
Ireland (IRMA)	29
New Zealand (Recorded Music NZ)	17
Scottish Singles Sales (Official Charts)	29
South Africa Airplay (EMA)	9
UK Singles (Official Charts)	31
UK Hip Hop/R&B (Official Charts)	6
US Billboard Hot 100	24
US Hot R&B/Hip-Hop Songs (Billboard)	7
US Rhythmic Airplay (Billboard)	10

=== Year-end charts ===
Chart (2014)	Position
US Hot R&B/Hip-Hop Songs (Billboard)	30
US Rhythmic (Billboard)	48

== Certifications ==
Region	Certification	Certified units/sales
Australia (ARIA)	2× Platinum	140,000^{‡}
Brazil (Pro-Música Brasil)	Gold	30,000^{‡}
New Zealand (RMNZ)	Platinum	30,000^{‡}
United Kingdom (BPI)	Gold	400,000^{‡}
^{‡} Sales+streaming figures based on certification alone.

== Credits and personnel ==
- Onika Maraj – vocals, songwriting
- Lukasz Gottwald – writing, producer
- Ester Dean – writing
- Henry Walter – writing, producer

== Release history ==
Country	Date	Format	Label	Ref.
United States	May 21, 2014	Digital download	Young Money; Cash Money; Republic	
Canada	May 21, 2014	Digital download	Young Money; Cash Money; Republic	
United Kingdom	May 21, 2014	Digital download	Young Money; Cash Money; Republic	
United States	June 10, 2014	Rhythmic contemporary	Young Money; Cash Money; Republic	
United States	June 10, 2014	Contemporary hit radio	Young Money; Cash Money; Republic	
