= Get on Your Knees (Nicki Minaj song) =

2014 song by Nicki Minaj featuring Ariana Grande

Song by Nicki Minaj featuring Ariana Grande

from the album The Pinkprint
- Studio: Conway Recording Studios (Los Angeles, CA); Glenwood Place Studios (Burbank, CA); eightysevenfourteen studios (Los Angeles, CA)
- Genre: Trap-pop
- Length: 3:36
- Label: Young Money; Cash Money; Republic
- Songwriters: Katy Perry; Chloe Angelides; Lukasz Gottwald; Sarah Hudson; Jacob Kasher Hindlin; Henry Walter
- Producers: Dr. Luke; Cirkut

"Get on Your Knees" is a song by Trinidadian rapper Nicki Minaj featuring American singer and longtime friend Ariana Grande from Minaj's third album The Pinkprint (2014). The song managed to enter single charts in multiple countries due to strong digital sales following the album's release.

== Background and release ==
"Get on Your Knees" is a trap-pop song with Nicki Minaj rapping the verses and Ariana Grande singing the chorus and bridge. Lyrically the song depict themes of asserting sexual dominance and embracing empowerment. Katy Perry being one of the writers of the song fueled rumors about her being featured on the song, but the final track featured Ariana Grande instead. In an interview by Fashion & Style, Nicki Minaj herself has described Ariana Grande's delivery on the song as "very, very, sexy".

"Get on Your Knees" leaked on 11 December 2014, just a few days prior to being released as a part of Nicki Minaj's third studio album The Pinkprint on 15 December 2014. Following the release, Minaj and Grande traded compliments about the song on Twitter.

The song was performed live by Nicki Minaj and Ariana Grande on 7 April 2016 at T-Mobile Arena's grand opening concert in Las Vegas, where they also performed their first collaboration "Bang Bang".

== Reception ==
"Get on Your Knees" was received positively by critics, with many applauding the song's production and its explicit and empowering lyrics. In an album review, Muhammad Tariq from The California Aggie describes the song as "the empowering, boost of personal-confidence and gym anthem", noting the explicit lyrics with messages of "confidence, self-love and recognizing our self-worth". Kim Osorio from NPR commented that Nicki's verses on the song "can be a bit too much to stomach" but that the "beats and the catchy choruses will keep you sucking on that crackpipe". Katherine St. Asaph from Time calls the song's production "disarmingly pretty", observing how Minaj and Grande explore their prowess in both expressing their sexuality and showcasing their exceptional vocal abilities in the song. Randall Roberts from the Los Angeles Times delineates Minaj as a "hardened lover uninterested in emotion" in the song. The Guardian's critic panel highlighted how the song exemplifies the producer Dr. Luke's "formulaic pop magic".

== Charts ==
Chart (2014–2015)	Peak position
Canada Hot 100 (Billboard)	98
France (SNEP)	181
Scotland Singles (OCC)	64
UK Singles (OCC)	86
UK Hip Hop/R&B (OCC)	7
US Billboard Hot 100	88
US Hot R&B/Hip-Hop Songs (Billboard)	26
