= Hey Mama (David Guetta song) =

Single by David Guetta featuring Nicki Minaj, Bebe Rexha and Afrojack

from the album Listen
- Released: 16 March 2015
- Recorded: 2014
- Studio: Jay Sound (Hilversum); MSR (New York City); EKAS (Santa Monica)
- Genre: Electro house; trap
- Length: 3:12
- Label: Parlophone; Atlantic
- Songwriters: Ester Dean; Sean Douglas; David Guetta; Giorgio Tuinfort; Onika Maraj; Bebe Rexha; Nick van de Wall
- Producers: David Guetta; Afrojack; Giorgio Tuinfort; Ester Dean

David Guetta singles chronology
"What I Did for Love" (2014)	"Hey Mama" (2015)	"Sun Goes Down" (2015)

Nicki Minaj singles chronology
"Truffle Butter" (2015)	"Hey Mama" (2015)	"The Night Is Still Young" (2015)

Bebe Rexha singles chronology
"Gone" (2014)	"Hey Mama" (2015)	"That's How You Know" (2015)

Afrojack singles chronology
"Turn Up the Speakers" (2014)	"Hey Mama" (2015)	"SummerThing!" (2015)

Music video
- "Hey Mama" on YouTube

"Hey Mama" is a song recorded by the French DJ and record producer David Guetta featuring singers Nicki Minaj and Bebe Rexha, and co-produced by the Dutch record producer Afrojack. The song was released on 16 March 2015, as the fourth single from Guetta's sixth studio album, Listen (2014). It was produced by David Guetta, Afrojack, and Giorgio Tuinfort, who also wrote the song with Rexha, Minaj, Ester Dean, and Sean Douglas. The track samples American ethnomusicologist Alan Lomax's 1948 recording of "Rosie", a work song sung by an Afro-American chain gang at the Mississippi State Penitentiary.

The song met a commercial success, reaching number one in Poland and Greece, becoming Guetta's fourth number one in these countries, Minaj's second and Rexha's first, while peaking at number eight on the Billboard Hot 100 in the United States, and peaking within the top 10 in numerous countries including Australia, Austria, Belgium, Canada, Finland, France, Germany, Hungary, Ireland, Israel, Lebanon, the Netherlands, New Zealand, Scotland, Spain, Sweden, Switzerland, and the United Kingdom. The song also reached the top 10 on several additional national singles charts, reflecting its broad international chart performance.

== Background and composition ==
The artists co-wrote the song with Ester Dean, Sean Douglas, and Giorgio Tuinfort; the latter co-produced it with Guetta and Afrojack. The intro and post-chorus features a prominent sample from "Rosie", an Alan Lomax recording from the 1940s.

Rexha explained to Billboard why she wasn't initially credited as a featured artist on the track: "We talked about it - I actually emailed Guetta about it. I really wanted to be featured on it, because, you know, I've been signed and dropped, and now signed a second time, so it's been hard. What ended up happening was that it looked like a lot of names on the title, so they wanted to keep as many low features as possible. That's what I was told, and it makes sense to me. I guess more than two [featured] names doesn't look good on the radio. It's tough hearing your voice on the radio, on a chorus, and knowing that people think it's another artist." As of June 2015, Rexha is officially credited in all instances of the song's mention.

"Hey Mama" is the third collaboration between Guetta and Minaj, following Nothing but the Beat singles "Where Them Girls At" (also featuring Flo Rida) and the double-platinum "Turn Me On" (both 2011).

According to the sheet music published at Musicnotes.com, "Hey Mama" is written in the key of E minor with a tempo of 86 beats per minute. The vocals in the song span from A_{3} to E_{5}.

== Critical reception ==
"Hey Mama" was well received by critics, with many praising the discothèque nature of the song. Bianca Gracie of Idolator described it as "a crazed electro-house/trap sound", noting Minaj's "rap flow into a island-tinged romp." It was described by Direct Lyrics as an "intelligently-produced radio-friendly EDM-island sound", whilst Richard Baxter of Popology Now complimented the track's electronic styles, describing Bebe Rexha as the "star" of "Hey Mama" with her "hook heavy chorus".

Several music companies and reviewers chose "Hey Mama" as the highlight of the album, with Billboard describing it as a "bombastic island-flavored jam" and the Associated Press stating Minaj and Afrojack had produced "a startling R&B bump and funk gem." Minaj, in particular, received positive reviews for her vocals, with Newsday calling the track Minaj's "most undeniable hit" since her song "Super Bass", and The Guardian describing Minaj's vocals as a highlight from the album.

The song's lyrics, on the other hand, have been subject to criticism from feminist media, with many of them calling the lyrics sexist. Katie Barnes of Feministing described the song's second verse ("Yes I do the cooking/ Yes I do the cleaning/ Plus I keep the na-na real sweet for your eating/ Yes you be the boss and yes I be respecting / Whatever that you tell me cause it's game you be spitting") as "pretty terrible," stating that, "It doesn’t matter if the verse is accompanied by a bumpin’ beat, the lyrics still present a retro ideal of what a woman should be and how she should treat her man." Katherine Burks of The Lala called the lyrics "horribly misogynistic bullshit." Alex Kritselis of Bustle found the lyrics "seriously groan-inducing," noting that "the whole 'I'll do whatever you want, whenever you want' vibe" made him "more than a little uneasy."

== Commercial performance ==
The song peaked at number eight on the Billboard Hot 100, becoming Guetta's sixth top 10 in the US, also making Minaj's twelve, Afrojack's second since Pitbull's "Give Me Everything", and Rexha's first as a singer but her second as a writer after the number one Billboard Hot 100 hit "The Monster" by Eminem featuring Rihanna. It spent six weeks in the top 10 of the Billboard Hot 100 chart. "Hey Mama" spent five weeks within the top 10 of the UK Singles Chart. The song rose to number 10 and remained there for four weeks until it peaked at number nine. It peaked at number two in the UK R&B Chart.

== Music video ==
The official video (directed by John Ryan) was released on 19 May 2015. The video begins with Guetta walking through a desert with a group of people to find a machine inside the box. Scenes of a holographic Minaj intercut the video while other scenes include other people being shrouded in curtains and dancing while during the chorus, Guetta and the others are seen driving in their vehicles through the desert. During the chorus and bridge, everyone dances while Minaj raps. Meanwhile, a screen plays various clips of natural scenes, such as bolts of lightning and a swarm of sharks swimming. The video ends with people walking through and sitting around a neon heart light and one last shot of the holographic Minaj, before cutting to Guetta standing in the desert. Afrojack also appears in the video.

As of June 2025, the video has received over 1.6 billion views. It is Guetta's and Rexha's most viewed video, and Minaj's fourth.

== Live performances ==
On 17 May 2015, Guetta and Minaj performed the song for the first time on 2015 Billboard Music Awards along with "The Night Is Still Young". Thirteen days later, Minaj and Rexha also performed the song together for the first time on the iHeartRadio Summer Pool Party 2015 in Las Vegas, joined by Guetta on stage.

== Track listing ==
Digital download – Afrojack remix
No.	Title	Length
1.	"Hey Mama" (featuring Nicki Minaj, Bebe Rexha and Afrojack; Afrojack Remix)	3:17

Remixes EP
No.	Title	Length
1.	"Hey Mama" (featuring Nicki Minaj, Bebe Rexha, and Afrojack; Afrojack Remix)	3:17
2.	"Hey Mama" (featuring Nicki Minaj, Bebe Rexha, and Afrojack; Glowinthedark Remix)	4:15
3.	"Hey Mama" (featuring Nicki Minaj, Bebe Rexha, and Afrojack; Noodles remix)	5:02
4.	"Hey Mama" (featuring Nicki Minaj, Bebe Rexha, and Afrojack; Modern Machines Remix)	4:11
5.	"Hey Mama" (featuring Nicki Minaj, Bebe Rexha, and Afrojack; DJ LBR Remix)	3:23
6.	"Hey Mama" (featuring Nicki Minaj, Bebe Rexha, and Afrojack; Club Killers Remix)	4:01
7.	"Hey Mama" (featuring Nicki Minaj, Bebe Rexha, and Afrojack; Extended Remix)	4:42
8.	"Hey Mama" (featuring Nicki Minaj, Bebe Rexha, and Afrojack; Davoodi Remix)	2:53

== Charts ==
=== Weekly charts ===
Weekly chart performance for "Hey Mama"
Chart (2015–21)	Peak position
Australia (ARIA)	5
Austria (Ö3 Austria Top 40)	5
Belgium (Ultratop 50 Flanders)	9
Belgium (Ultratop 50 Wallonia)	9
Canada Hot 100 (Billboard)	9
Canada CHR/Top 40 (Billboard)	5
Canada Hot AC (Billboard)	31
CIS Airplay (TopHit)	30
Czech Republic Airplay (ČNS IFPI)	14
Czech Republic Singles Digital (ČNS IFPI)	4
Denmark (Tracklisten)	13
Euro Digital Song Sales (Billboard)	6
Finland (Suomen virallinen lista)	6
France Airplay (SNEP)	5
France (SNEP)	6
Germany (GfK)	9
Greece Digital Songs (Billboard)	1
Hungary (Dance Top 40)	3
Hungary (Rádiós Top 40)	5
Hungary (Single Top 40)	8
Hungary (Stream Top 40)	3
Ireland (IRMA)	5
Israel International Airplay (Media Forest)	3
Italy (FIMI)	13
Japan Hot 100 (Billboard)	82
Lebanon (Lebanese Top 20)	2
Netherlands (Dutch Top 40)	12
Netherlands (Single Top 100)	10
New Zealand (Recorded Music NZ)	5
Norway (VG-lista)	13
Poland (Video Chart)	5
Poland (Polish Airplay New)	1
Romania Airplay (Media Forest)	6
Russia Airplay (TopHit)	34
Scottish Singles Sales (Official Charts)	8
Slovenia (SloTop50)	46
South Korea (Gaon)	32
Spain (Promusicae)	6
Sweden (Sverigetopplistan)	6
Switzerland (Schweizer Hitparade)	10
UK Singles (Official Charts)	9
UK Hip Hop/R&B (Official Charts)	2
Ukraine Airplay (TopHit)	41
US Billboard Hot 100	8
US Adult Pop Airplay (Billboard)	34
US Dance Club Songs (Billboard)	30
US Hot Dance/Electronic Songs (Billboard)	1
US Pop Airplay (Billboard)	2
US Rhythmic Airplay (Billboard)	1

=== Year-end charts ===
2015 year-end chart performance for "Hey Mama"
Chart (2015)	Position
Australia (ARIA)	47
Austria (Ö3 Austria Top 40)	27
Belgium (Ultratop Flanders)	35
Belgium (Ultratop Wallonia)	40
Canada (Canadian Hot 100)	24
France (SNEP)	25
Germany (Official German Charts)	34
Hungary (Dance Top 40)	18
Hungary (Rádiós Top 40)	40
Hungary (Single Top 40)	31
Israel (Media Forest)	27
Italy (FIMI)	37
Netherlands (Dutch Top 40)	45
Netherlands (Single Top 100)	32
New Zealand (Recorded Music NZ)	34
Spain (PROMUSICAE)	27
Sweden (Sverigetopplistan)	29
Switzerland (Schweizer Hitparade)	29
UK Singles (Official Charts Company)	54
US Billboard Hot 100	31
US Hot Dance/Electronic Songs (Billboard)	3
US Mainstream Top 40 (Billboard)	15
US Rhythmic (Billboard)	22

2016 year-end chart performance for "Hey Mama"
Chart (2016)	Position
Hungary (Dance Top 40)	100
US Hot Dance/Electronic Songs (Billboard)	47

2021 year-end chart performance for "Hey Mama"
Chart (2021)	Position
South Korea (Gaon)	170

2022 year-end chart performance for "Hey Mama"
Chart (2022)	Position
Hungary (Rádiós Top 40)	74

2024 year-end chart performance for "Hey Mama"
Chart (2024)	Position
Hungary (Rádiós Top 40)	93

=== Decade-end charts ===
2010s-end chart performance for "Hey Mama"
Chart (2010–2019)	Position
US Hot Dance/Electronic Songs (Billboard)	14

== Certifications ==
Certifications for "Hey Mama"
Region	Certification	Certified units/sales
Australia (ARIA)	2× Platinum	140,000^{^}
Austria (IFPI Austria)	Gold	15,000^{‡}
Belgium (BRMA)	2× Platinum	40,000^{‡}
Canada (Music Canada)	3× Platinum	240,000^{‡}
Denmark (IFPI Danmark)	Platinum	60,000^{^}
Germany (BVMI)	Platinum	400,000^{‡}
Italy (FIMI)	3× Platinum	150,000^{‡}
Netherlands (NVPI)	Platinum	30,000^{‡}
New Zealand (RMNZ)	2× Platinum	60,000^{‡}
Norway (IFPI Norway)	2× Platinum	120,000^{‡}
Poland (ZPAV)	Platinum	50,000^{‡}
Spain (Promusicae)	Platinum	40,000^{‡}
Sweden (GLF)	2× Platinum	80,000^{‡}
Switzerland (IFPI Switzerland)	Platinum	30,000^{‡}
United Kingdom (BPI)	Platinum	600,000^{‡}
United States (RIAA)	4× Platinum	4,000,000^{‡}
^{^} Shipments figures based on certification alone.^{‡} Sales+streaming figures based on certification alone.

== Release history ==
Release dates for "Hey Mama"
Region	Date	Format	Label
Worldwide	16 March 2015	Digital download	What a Music
United States	17 March 2015	Mainstream radio	Atlantic; Parlophone
United Kingdom	4 May 2015	Mainstream radio	Parlophone
France	4 May 2015	Digital download	Parlophone
Germany	5 June 2015	CD single	Parlophone

== Awards and nominations ==
Year	Event	Prize	Nominated work	Result	Ref.
2015	Teen Choice Awards	Best Collaboration	" Hey Mama "	Nominated	
2015	MTV Europe Music Awards	Best Collaboration	" Hey Mama "	Nominated	
2015	MTV Video Music Awards	Song of Summer	" Hey Mama "	Nominated	
2015	NRJ Music Award	Video of the Year	" Hey Mama "	Nominated	
2016	iHeartRadio Music Awards	Dance Song of the Year	" Hey Mama "	Nominated	
2016	Billboard Music Award	Top Dance/Electronic Song	" Hey Mama "	Nominated	
2016	BMI London Awards	Award-Winning Songs	" Hey Mama "	Won	
2016	BMI London Awards	Dance Song Award	" Hey Mama "	Won	
2016	BMI Pop Awards	Award-Winning Songs	" Hey Mama "	Won	
2016	International Dance Music Awards	Best Rap/Hip Hop/Trap Dance Track	" Hey Mama "	Won	
