= Bed of Lies =

Single by Nicki Minaj featuring Skylar Grey

from the album The Pinkprint
- Released: November 16, 2014
- Recorded: 2014
- Studio: Glenwood Place Studios (Burbank, CA)
- Genre: Pop; hip hop
- Length: 4:29; 3:55 (album edit – international deluxe)
- Label: Young Money; Cash Money; Republic
- Songwriters: Onika Maraj; Holly Hafermann; Daniel Johnson; Jeremy Coleman; Breyan Isaac; Vinay Vyas; Justin Davey
- Producers: Alex da Kid; Kane Beatz; TODAY; Breyan Isaac; JMIKE

Nicki Minaj singles chronology
"Only" (2014)	"Bed of Lies" (2014)	"Throw Sum Mo" (2014)

Skylar Grey singles chronology
"Shot Me Down" (2014)	"Bed of Lies" (2014)	"Cannonball" (2015)

Audio video
- "Bed Of Lies" on YouTube

"Bed of Lies" is a song by rapper Nicki Minaj, taken from her third studio album, The Pinkprint (2014). The song was first premiered at the 2014 MTV EMAs in Glasgow, Scotland and was later released on November 16, 2014, by Young Money Entertainment, Cash Money Records and Republic Records as the fourth single from the album. The track features American singer-songwriter Skylar Grey on the chorus plus additional vocals on the verses as well as piano playing and was written by the latter along with Minaj. "Bed of Lies" features a restrained keyboard and lyrics that touch upon themes of "heartfelt litany of grievances" about an ex-lover.

The song peaked at number 62 on the US Billboard Hot 100 and became Minaj's 56th Hot 100 entry, tying her with Madonna and Dionne Warwick for the third-most entries among women. It peaked at number seven in Australia and number 13 in New Zealand. "Bed of Lies" was certified platinum by the Australian Recording Industry Association and gold by Recorded Music NZ.

== Background ==
Minaj debuted the song at the 2014 MTV EMAs in Glasgow, Scotland with Skylar Grey. In an interview with Billboard, Grey revealed that she had written and recorded a demo version of the track before it had been sent to Minaj who wrote and recorded verses of her own to the song. Grey commented, "She liked the demo of it enough to keep me on the song. I knew it was maybe gonna happen, but she released a lot of different singles first. So I didn’t really know when she was gonna drop this song. And then about a week ago I got a call from her team and they wondered if I could come to Scotland and do the song with them." On November 15, the full song premiered on Saturday Night Online; it was made available on iTunes the next day.

== Composition ==
"Bed of Lies" is a hip hop and pop song, written in the key of B major with a moderate tempo of 86 beats per minute. The vocals in the song span from G♯_{3} to B_{4}, and the song follows a chord progression of B – F♯/A♯ – G♯m – F♯/A♯ – B.

== Critical reception ==
"Bed of Lies"
A 27-second sample of "Bed of Lies" by Nicki Minaj featuring Skylar Grey, where the chorus is heard.

Deniqua Campbell from The Source gave the song a positive review, saying Minaj has yet to let up her unrelenting push to re-ignite her rapping flame and that "Bed of Lies" "appeals to Minaj's more serene nature". Caitlin White from MTV News praised the song, saying "Nicki has always done emotional with just the right touch of vulnerability and strength". Lindsey Weber from Vulture said "Nicki takes a sickly sweet Skylar Grey hook and wraps a nasty ode around it". Sharan Shetty from Slate called "Bed of Lies" "perhaps the most confessional song Minaj has ever made" and praised the fact that Minaj didn't come off as having a "pity party". Eliza Thompson from Cosmopolitan praised the song and said Grey's hook was "all pretty and wistful".

== Commercial performance ==
"Bed of Lies" debuted at number seventy on the US Billboard Hot 100, in doing so it became Minaj's 56th entry on the chart, tying her with Madonna and Dionne Warwick for the third-most entries among women since the chart began in 1958. On January 16, 2015, ARIA certified the single Platinum in Australia for sales of 70,000.

== Live performances ==
On November 9, 2014, Minaj and Grey debuted the song performing at the 2014 MTV EMA. They also performed the song on November 23, 2014, at the 2014 AMAs and on December 6, 2014, on Saturday Night Live. On December 15, 2014, they performed the track at The Ellen DeGeneres Show. On December 16, 2014, they performed the song twice, first on Today and after on The Tonight Show Starring Jimmy Fallon.

== Charts ==
=== Weekly charts ===
Chart (2014–15)	Peak position
Australia (ARIA)	7
Australian Urban (ARIA)	3
Belgium (Ultratip Bubbling Under Flanders)	50
Belgium Urban (Ultratop Flanders)	23
Canada Hot 100 (Billboard)	41
Czech Republic Singles Digital (ČNS IFPI)	74
France (SNEP)	134
Ireland (IRMA)	56
Lebanon (Lebanese Top 20)	12
New Zealand (Recorded Music NZ)	13
Norway (VG-lista)	10
Sweden (Sverigetopplistan)	11
UK Singles (Official Charts)	73
UK Hip Hop/R&B (Official Charts)	4
US Billboard Hot 100	62
US Hot R&B/Hip-Hop Songs (Billboard)	19
US Rhythmic Airplay (Billboard)	38

=== Year-end charts ===
Chart (2014)	Position
Australia Urban (ARIA)	17

Chart (2015)	Position
Australia Urban (ARIA)	21
Sweden (Sverigetopplistan)	91

== Certifications ==
Region	Certification	Certified units/sales
Australia (ARIA)	2× Platinum	140,000^{‡}
New Zealand (RMNZ)	Platinum	30,000^{‡}
Norway (IFPI Norway)	Platinum	10,000^{‡}
Sweden (GLF)	2× Platinum	80,000^{‡}
^{‡} Sales+streaming figures based on certification alone.

== Radio and release history ==
Region	Date	Format	Label
Worldwide	November 16, 2014	Digital download	Young Money; Cash Money; Republic
United States	November 18, 2014	Rhythmic radio	Young Money; Cash Money; Republic
United Kingdom	December 15, 2014	Digital download	Young Money; Cash Money; Republic
Italy	December 19, 2014	Mainstream radio	Young Money; Cash Money; Republic
