= Do We Have a Problem? =

2022 single by Nicki Minaj and Lil Baby

Single by Nicki Minaj and Lil Baby
- Released: February 4, 2022
- Genre: Hip hop; trap
- Length: 3:27
- Label: Young Money; Republic
- Composer: Anthony Woart Jr.
- Lyricists: Onika Maraj; Dominique Jones; Joshua Goods
- Producer: Papi Yerr

Nicki Minaj singles chronology
"Boyz" (2021)	"Do We Have a Problem?" (2022)	"Bussin" (2022)

Lil Baby singles chronology
"Flights" (2021)	"Do We Have a Problem?" (2022)	"Bussin" (2022)

Music video
- "Do We Have a Problem?" on YouTube

"Do We Have a Problem?" is a song by American rappers Nicki Minaj and Lil Baby. It was released on February 4, 2022. The music video is inspired by the 2010 movie Salt. In the United States, the song debuted and peaked at number 2 on the Billboard Hot 100, and topped the Hot R&B/Hip-Hop Songs chart. Internationally, it reached number 3 in South Africa, and 14 in Canada. It was included on Minaj's first greatest hits album, Queen Radio: Volume 1 (2022).

== Background ==
On September 30, 2020, Minaj gave birth to a son, nicknamed "Papa Bear", and announced a break from music to focus on raising her child. After being featured on the remix of Bia's 2021 single, "Whole Lotta Money" and Jesy Nelson's 2021 debut single "Boyz", Minaj began teasing new music in January 2022 and released a teaser for "Do We Have a Problem?" on January 31. She also shared a hotline and asked fans to respond with problems they were facing in their lives, which she would respond to.

In an interview, Minaj said that motherhood had changed her approach to writing lyrics and that she wanted to now stray from penning songs that were too overtly sexual and that she wanted to return to the mixtape-style bars she used earlier in her career. In an interview with Zane Lowe on Apple Music 1, Minaj said that upon hearing the track's beat for the first time she immediately knew she wanted to include Lil Baby on it because it was his "vibe" and the song was "to bring back rap records" with the "natural essence of rap".

== Critical reception ==
Jessica McKinney of Complex complimented Minaj's delivery on the first verse, saying that she "demonstrates her skill, weaving in and out of different flows while paying homage to fallen rappers", while Eric Skelton said that she was "clearly trying to push herself into new territory." Skelton also called the song ambitious and said that "for the most part [...] Nicki pulled off what she was going for".

== Accolades ==
Awards and nominations for "Do We Have a Problem?"
Year	Organization	Award	Result	Ref.
2022	MTV Video Music Awards	Best Hip Hop	Won	
2022	People's Choice Awards	Collaboration song of 2022	Nominated	

== Commercial performance ==
"Do We Have a Problem?" charted within the top 20 in four territories. The song debuted at number seven on the Billboard Global 200 chart dated February 19, 2022, earning Minaj her eleventh entry and her first top-10 entry, and marked Lil Baby's fifth.

In the United States, "Do We Have a Problem?" debuted at number two on the Billboard Hot 100 chart issue dated February 19, 2022. It marked Minaj's 20th career top-10 entry on the Hot 100, and Lil Baby's ninth; it concurrently tied as Lil Baby's highest-charting entry since his Drake collaborations "Girls Want Girls" and "Wants and Needs" both debuted and peaked at #2 in March and September 2021 respectively. Additionally, "Do We Have a Problem?" debuted atop the Digital Songs chart with 48,000 digital downloads sold in its first week, marking Minaj's ninth chart topper and Lil Baby's first on the chart. The song drew 24.4 million on-demand streams, allowing it to debut at number two on the Streaming Songs chart. "Do We Have a Problem?" also topped the Hot R&B/Hip-Hop Songs and Hot Rap Songs charts, earning Minaj her seventh number-one and Lil Baby's first on both. It spent thirteen weeks on the Hot 100. In Canada, the song debuted at number 14 on the Canadian Hot 100.

In the United Kingdom, the track entered the UK Singles Chart at number 31, while debuting at number 16 on the UK R&B Chart, for the week ending February 17, 2022. In Ireland, it landed at number 48 on the Irish Singles Chart, while reaching number seven in Hungary singles sales chart. The song reached a peak of number six on the New Zealand Hot Singles chart, the ranking of songs out of the top 40, and peaked at number three in South Africa.

== Music video ==
Minaj released the teaser for the music video on January 31, 2022. The video is themed around the 2010 movie Salt, which Minaj describes as "one of her favorite films". The nine-minute visual, directed by Benny Boom, features actors Cory Hardrict and Joseph Sikora and sees Minaj play a double agent. She released the official music video on February 4, 2022. The video received the award for Best Hip-Hop Video at the 2022 MTV Video Music Awards.

== Track listing ==
Digital download / streaming

1. "Do We Have a Problem?" – 3:27

Digital download / streaming – instrumental

1. "Do We Have a Problem?" (Instrumental) – 3:27

== Charts ==
=== Weekly charts ===
Weekly chart performance for "Do We Have a Problem?"
Chart (2022)	Peak position
Canada Hot 100 (Billboard)	14
France (SNEP)	193
Global 200 (Billboard)	7
Greece International (IFPI)	50
Hungary (Single Top 40)	7
Ireland (IRMA)	48
New Zealand Hot Singles (RMNZ)	6
Portugal (AFP)	114
South Africa Streaming (TOSAC)	3
Switzerland (Schweizer Hitparade)	78
UK Singles (OCC)	31
UK Hip Hop/R&B (OCC)	16
US Billboard Hot 100	2
US Hot R&B/Hip-Hop Songs (Billboard)	1
US R&B/Hip-Hop Airplay (Billboard)	9
US Rhythmic Airplay (Billboard)	5

=== Year-end charts ===
2022 year-end chart performance for "Do We Have a Problem?"
Chart (2022)	Position
US Hot R&B/Hip-Hop Songs (Billboard)	30
US Digital Song Sales (Billboard)	45
US Rhythmic (Billboard)	31

== Certifications ==
Certifications for "Do We Have a Problem?"
Region	Certification	Certified units/sales
United States (RIAA)	Gold	500,000^{‡}
^{‡} Sales+streaming figures based on certification alone.

== Release history ==
Release history for "Do We Have a Problem?"
Region	Date	Format(s)	Version	Label	Ref.
Various	February 4, 2022	Digital download; streaming	Original	Republic	
Various	February 4, 2022	Digital download; streaming	Instrumental	Republic	
