= List of best-selling female rappers =

The following is a list of the best-selling female rappers of all time, based on sales of albums and singles. As of 2016, traditional sales have been combined with streaming and digital downloads, making up album-equivalent units.

== Best-selling female rappers worldwide ==
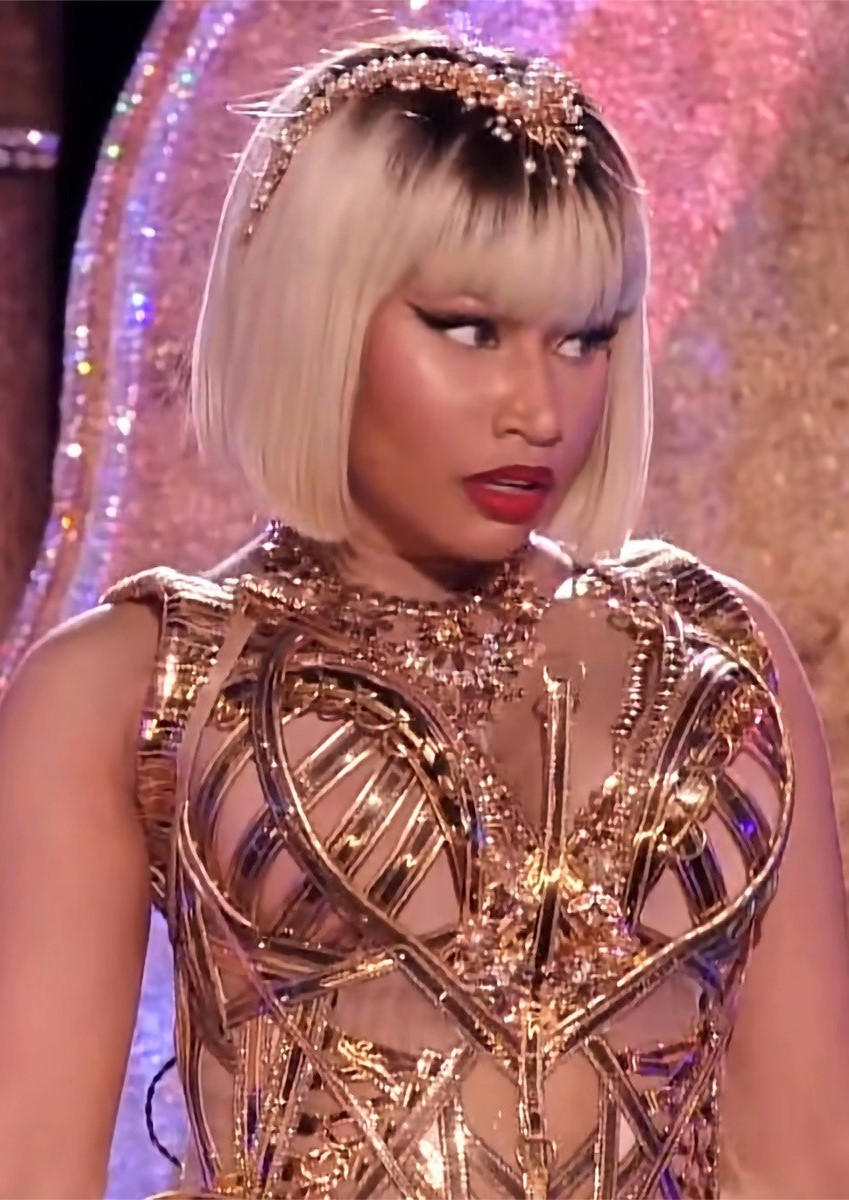
Nicki Minaj

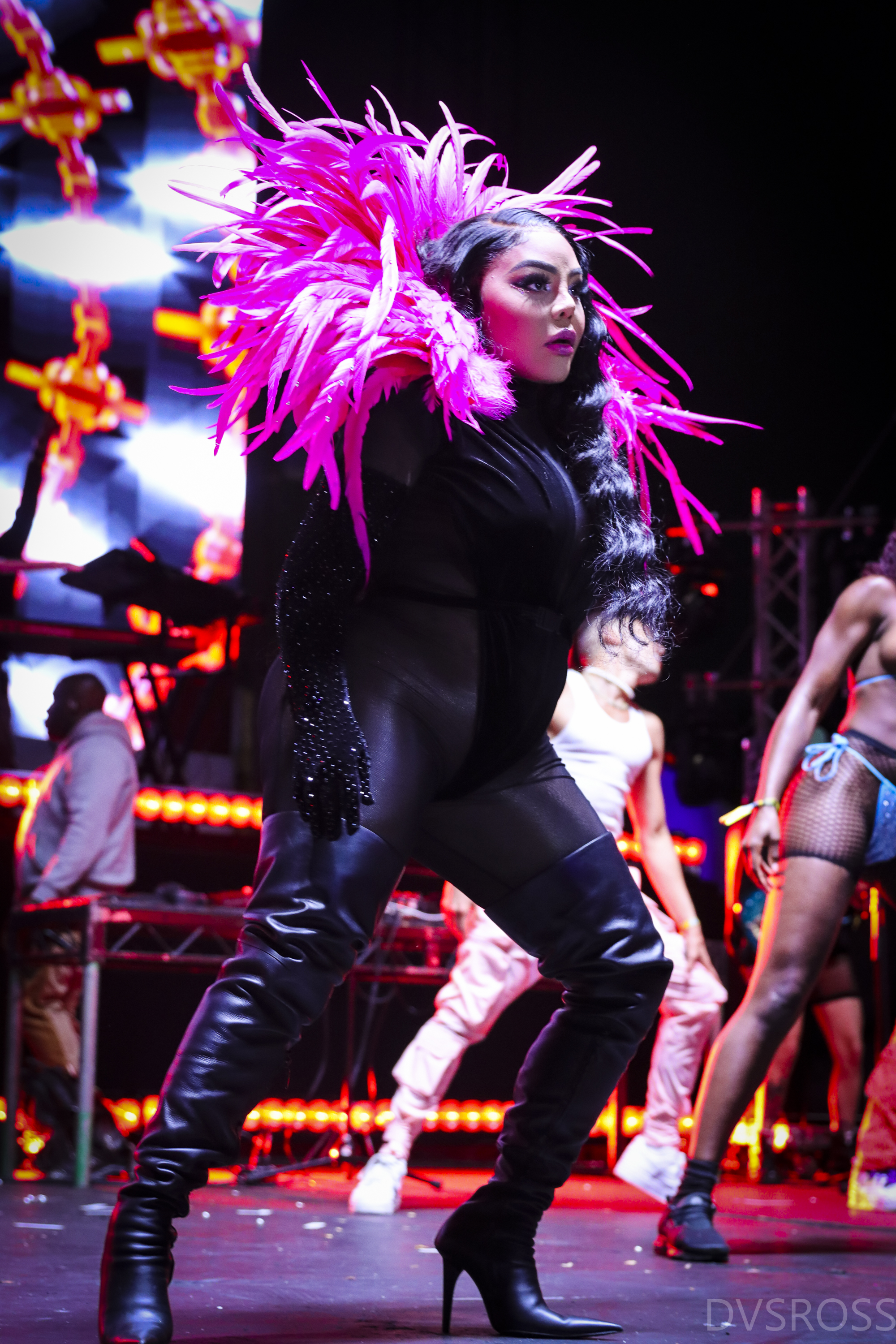
Lil' Kim

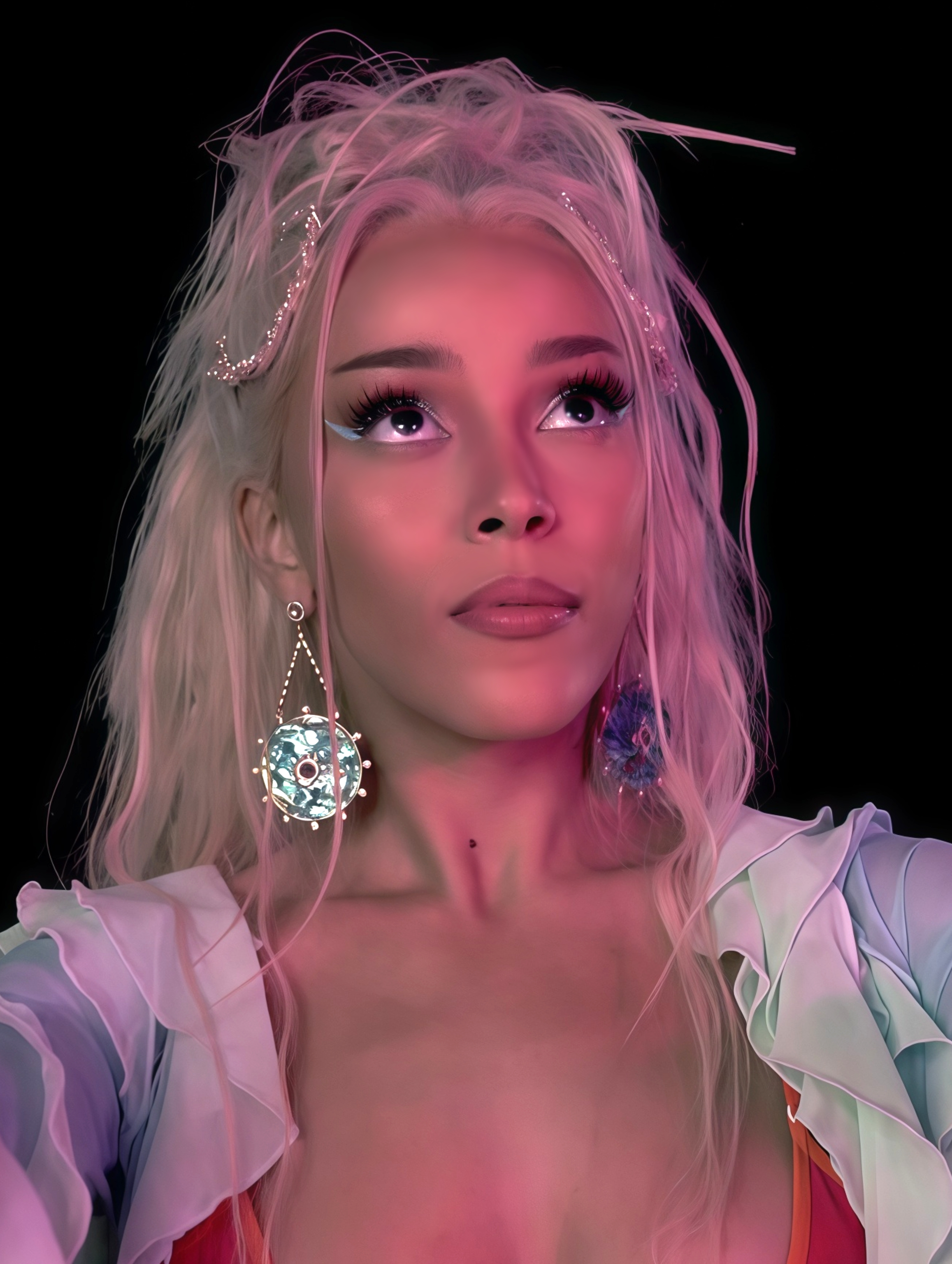
Doja Cat

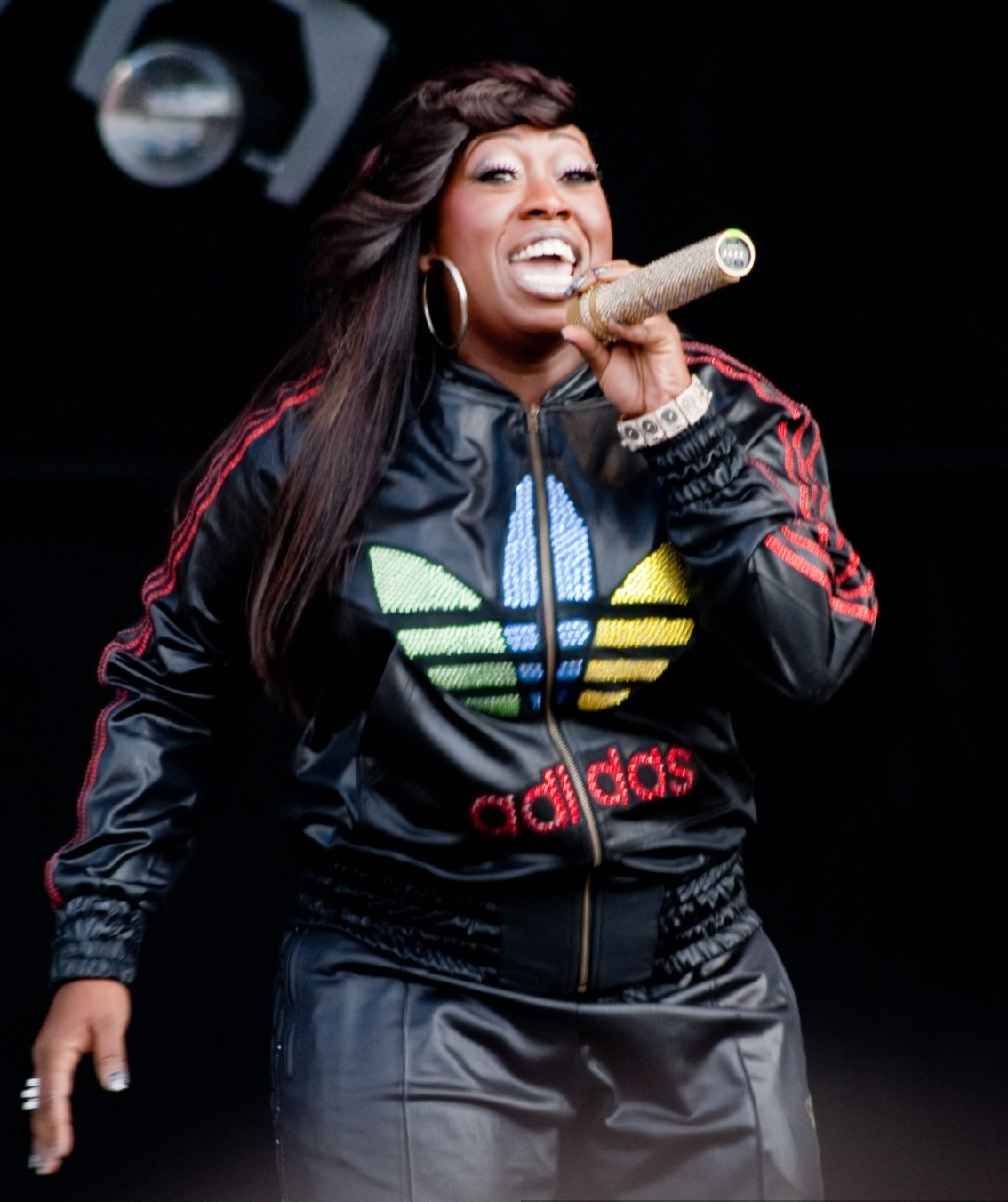
Missy Elliott

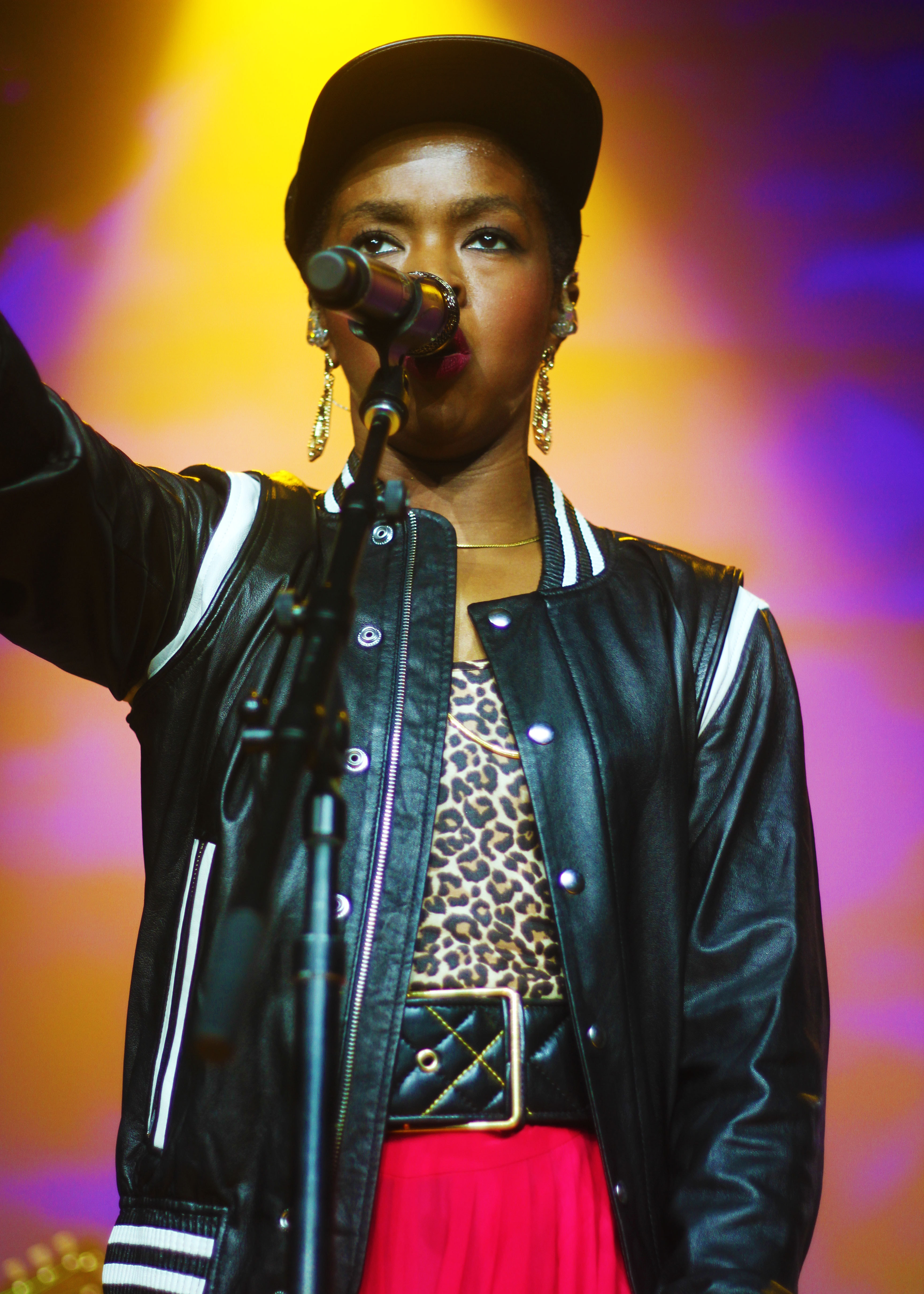
Lauryn Hill

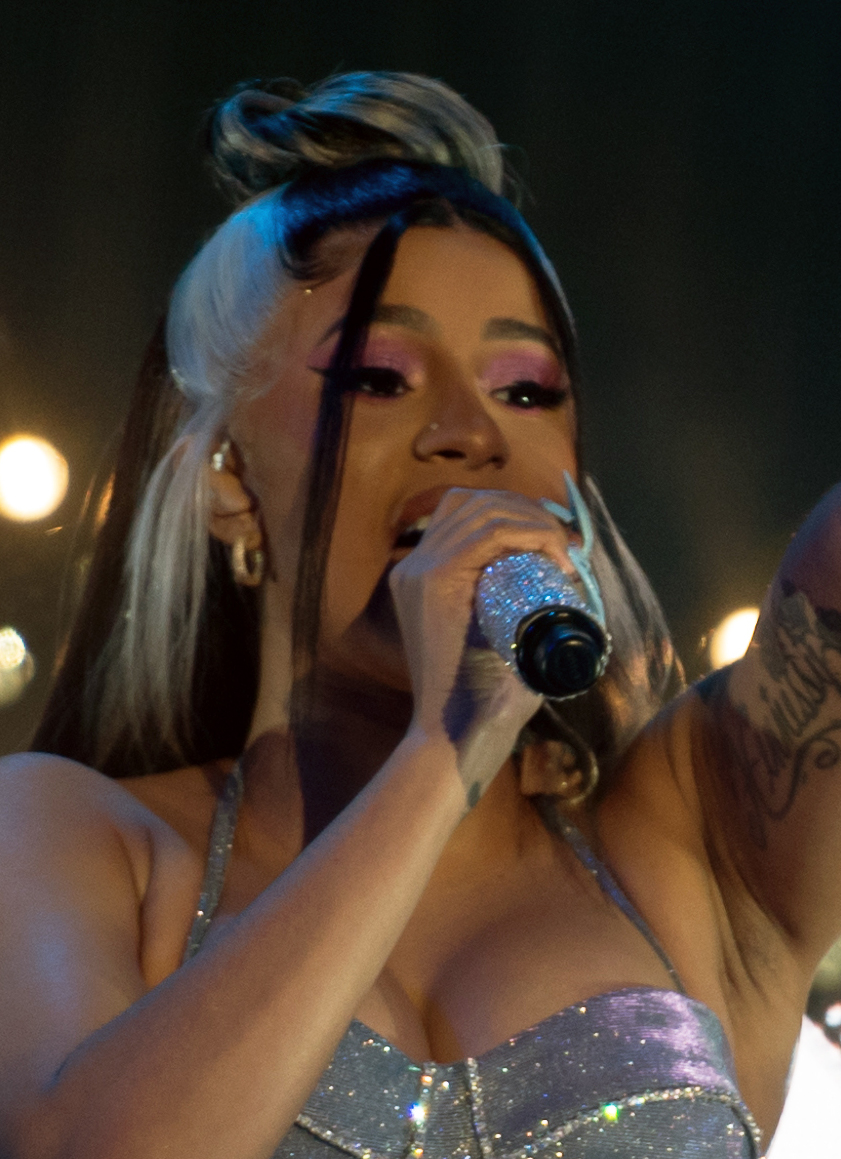
Cardi B

Artist	Country of origin	Year of first recording certification	Singles	Studio albums	Total certified units (from available markets)	Reported sales
Nicki Minaj	Trinidad & Tobago	2009	136	5	200.5 million: US: 132.96 million; UK: 24.4 million; France: 1.099 million; Brazil: 470,000; Canada: 2.96 million; Australia: 4.235 million; Germany: 2.45 million; Mexico: 6.96 million; New Zealand: 247,500; Italy: 775,000; Poland: 185,000; Denmark: 430,000; Spain: 610,000; Japan: 550,000; Norway: 595,000; Sweden: 420,000; Switzerland: 180,000	120 million
Lil' Kim	United States	1996	36	5	8.35 million: US: 5.5 million; UK: 1.26 million; France: 250,000; Canada: 50,000; Australia: 175,000; Germany: 750,000; Netherlands: 100,000; New Zealand: 75,000; Italy: 25,000; Denmark: 45,000; Norway: 10,000; Sweden: 30,000; Switzerland: 20,000; Greece: 10,000	45 million
Doja Cat	United States	2020	49	5	109.14 million: US: 70.5 million; UK: 13.06 million; France: 2.966 million; Brazil: 5.2 million; Canada: 2.68 million; Australia: 4.31m million; Germany: 900,000; Mexico: 3.34 million; New Zealand: 1.7925 million; Italy: 790,000; Poland: 1.06 million; Denmark: 735,000; Spain: 450,000; Japan: 333,333; Norway: 350,000; Sweden: 160,000; Switzerland: 100,000; Austria: 135,000; Portugal: 135,000; Belgium: 120,000; Hungary: 12,000; Singapore: 10,000	34 million
Missy Elliott	United States	1997	74	6	30.31 million: US: 25 million; UK: 3.88 million; France: 350,000; Canada: 180,000; Australia: 315,000; New Zealand: 327,500; Germany: 150,000; Japan: 100,000; Ireland: 7,500	30 million
Lauryn Hill	United States	1998	20	1	26.34 million: US: 19 million; UK: 3.6 million; Canada: 800,000; Australia: 420,000; Japan: 1 million; New Zealand: 330,000; Denmark: 125,000; Netherlands: 100,000; Sweden: 95,000; Norway: 70,000; Belgium: 50,000; Switzerland: 50,000; Austria: 25,000; Italy: 25,000	20 million
Cardi B	United States	2017	45	2	132.26 million: US: 100.71 million; UK: 14.1 million; France: 2.4 million; Brazil: 360,000; Canada: 6.2 million; Australia: 1.505m million; Germany: 1.8 million; Mexico: 250,000; New Zealand: 1.275 million; Italy: 1.25 million; Poland: 430,000; Denmark: 785,000; Spain: 540,000; Norway: 320,000; Switzerland: 10,000; Austria: 30,000; Portugal: 155,000; Belgium: 140,000	16.925 million

== Best-selling albums from female rappers worldwide ==
Year	Album	Artist	Sales	Ref.
1998	The Miseducation of Lauryn Hill	Lauryn Hill	20 million	
2018	Invasion of Privacy	Cardi B	7.1 million	
1993	Very Necessary	Salt-N-Pepa	7 million	
1999	Da Real World	Missy Elliott	6 million	
1996	Hard Core	Lil' Kim	6 million	
2000	The Notorious K.I.M.	Lil' Kim	5.1 million	
1996	Ill Na Na	Foxy Brown	5 million	
2021	Planet Her	Doja Cat	4.6 million	
2012	Pink Friday: Roman Reloaded	Nicki Minaj	4.4 million	
2010	Pink Friday	Nicki Minaj	3.4 million	
2014	The New Classic	Iggy Azalea	3 million	

== Best-selling singles from female rappers worldwide ==
Sales based on claimed certifications by the RIAA in the United States.

Artist	Single	Released	Certified sales (in millions)	Source
Cardi B	"Bodak Yellow"	2017	13	
Nicki Minaj	"Super Bass"	2011	12	
Cardi B featuring J Balvin & Bad Bunny	"I Like It"	2018	11	
Nicki Minaj	"Starships"	2012	10	
Jessie J featuring Ariana Grande & Nicki Minaj	"Bang Bang"	2014	10	
Maroon 5 featuring Cardi B	"Girls Like You"	2017	10	
Iggy Azalea featuring Charli XCX	"Fancy"	2014	9	
Ariana Grande featuring Iggy Azalea	"Problem"	2014	8	
Cardi B featuring Megan Thee Stallion	"WAP"	2020	8	
G-Eazy feat. A$AP Rocky & Cardi B	"No Limit"	2017	7	
Lizzo	"Truth Hurts"	2017	7	
Doja Cat	"Say So"	2020	6	
Migos feat. Nicki Minaj & Cardi B	"Motorsport"	2017	6	
Ariana Grande feat. Nicki Minaj	"Side to Side"	2016	6	
Iggy Azalea featuring Rita Ora	"Black Widow"	2014	5	
Yo Gotti featuring Nicki Minaj	"Rake It Up"	2017	5	
Ciara featuring Missy Elliott	"1, 2 Step"	2004	5	
Big Sean featuring Nicki Minaj	"Dance (A$$)"	2011	5	
Doja Cat	"Streets"	2019	5	
Doja Cat featuring SZA	"Kiss Me More"	2021	5	
Lizzo	"Good As Hell"	2016	5	

== See also ==
- List of best-selling girl groups
- List of best-selling albums by women
