= Nicki Minaj =

Trinidadian rapper and singer-songwriter (born 1982)

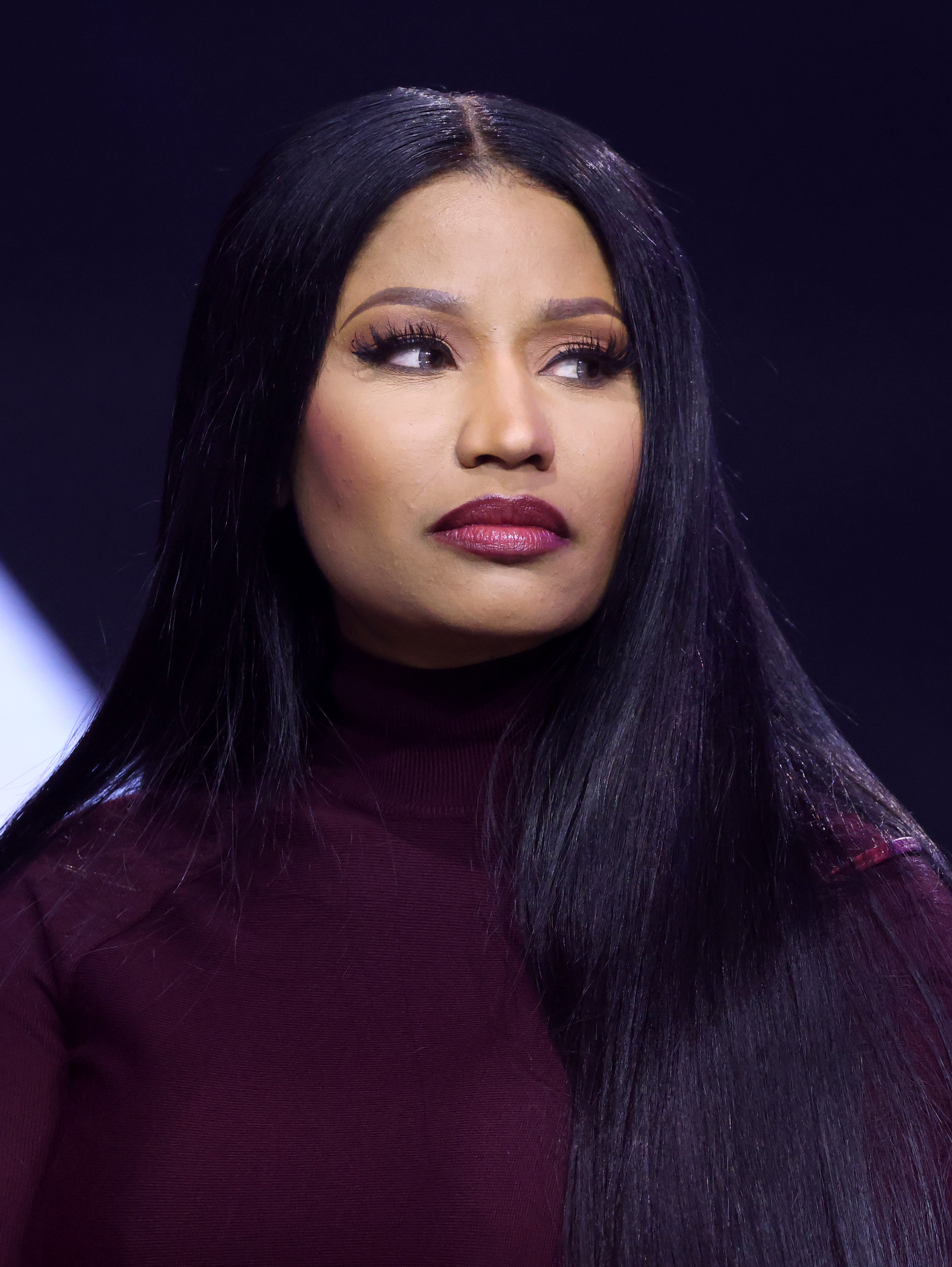
- Minaj in 2025
- Born: Onika Tanya Maraj; December 8, 1982 (age 43); Port of Spain, Trinidad and Tobago
- Occupations: Rapper; singer; songwriter
- Years active: 2002–present
- Works: Discography; songs; videography; performances
- Spouse: Kenneth Petty (m. 2019)
- Children: 1
- Awards: Full list
- Musical career
- Origin: Queens, New York City, US
- Genres: Hip-hop; pop; R&B
- Labels: Republic; Heavy On It; Young Money; Cash Money
- Website: nickiminajofficial.com

Onika Tanya Maraj-Petty (née Maraj; born December 8, 1982), known professionally as Nicki Minaj (/ˈnɪki mɪˈnɑːʒ/ NIK-ee min-AHZH), is a Trinidadian rapper, singer, and songwriter. Regarded as the "Queen of Rap" and one of the most influential rappers of all time, she is noted for her dynamic rap flow, witty lyrics, musical versatility, and alter egos, and is credited as a driving force in the mainstream resurgence of female rap since the 2010s.

Raised in New York City, Minaj began rapping professionally in the early 2000s and gained recognition with her three mixtapes between 2007 and 2009. Minaj's debut studio album, Pink Friday (2010), opened with the largest female rap album sales week of the 21st century, topped the US Billboard 200, and spawned the single "Super Bass". She explored dance-pop on her second US number-one album, Pink Friday: Roman Reloaded (2012), which produced the top-five single, "Starships". She returned to her hip-hop roots with The Pinkprint (2014) and Queen (2018), which yielded the singles "Anaconda" and "Chun-Li". Minaj achieved her first Billboard Hot 100 number-one singles with the 2020 duets "Say So" and "Trollz"; the former was the first female rap collaboration to top the chart. Her fifth studio album, Pink Friday 2 (2023), made her the female rapper with the most US number-one albums (three) and spawned her first solo US number-one single, "Super Freaky Girl". Its concert tour became the highest-grossing by a female rapper and one of the top five highest-grossing tours by a rapper in history.

Minaj is one of the best-selling music artists and the best-selling female rapper, with over 100 million records sold. She has over 54 million certified singles sold in the US and three diamond-certified singles, and in 2024 became the first female rapper with multiple diamond-certified solo songs (two) by the RIAA. In 2023, Billboard and Vibe ranked Minaj as the greatest female rapper of all time. Her various accolades include a Brit Award, five Billboard Music Awards, nine American Music Awards, eight MTV Video Music Awards (including the Michael Jackson Video Vanguard Award), eleven BET Awards, a Soul Train Music Award, and three Guinness World Records. Time named her one of the 100 most influential people in the world in 2016, and she was honored with the Billboard Women in Music Game Changer Award in 2019.

Minaj founded the record label imprint Heavy On It in 2023. Outside of music, her other endeavors include a fragrance line, a press on nails line, a Loci sneakers collection, and the radio show Queen Radio (2018–2023). She has also voice acted in the animated films Ice Age: Continental Drift (2012) and The Angry Birds Movie 2 (2019), and acted in the comedy films The Other Woman (2014) and Barbershop: The Next Cut (2016). On television, she served as a judge on the twelfth season of American Idol (2013). Her outspoken views have received significant media attention.

== Early life ==
Onika Tanya Maraj was born on December 8, 1982, in Saint James, Port of Spain, Trinidad and Tobago. Her father, Robert Maraj (1956–2021), was a financial executive and part-time gospel singer of Dougla (Afro-Trinidadian mother and Indo-Trinidadian father) descent, while her mother, Carol, is also a gospel singer with Afro-Trinidadian ancestry. Her mother worked in payroll and accounting departments during Minaj's youth. Her father was an alcoholic and crack cocaine addict whom Minaj described as violent to her mother and having commmitted arson on their house in December 1987. Minaj has an older brother, a younger brother, and a younger half-sister.

As a child, Minaj lived with her grandmother in Saint James in a household with 11 cousins. Her mother worked many jobs in Saint James before getting her green card at the age of 24. She then moved to the Bronx, New York City, to attend Monroe College, leaving Minaj in Trinidad with her grandmother. When Minaj was five, Carol brought her to live with her and her father in South Jamaica, Queens. Minaj said she arrived in the U.S as an illegal immigrant, after which she gained legal resident status.

Minaj successfully auditioned for admission to Fiorello H. LaGuardia High School of Music & Art and Performing Arts, which focuses on visual and performing arts. A week after graduation, she was cast in the Off-Broadway play In Case You Forget. In her youth, Minaj worked many jobs, including as a waitress at a Red Lobster in the Bronx, customer service representative, and office management on Wall Street, and was fired for discourtesy to customers.

== Career ==
=== 2002–2009: Career beginnings and mixtapes ===
From 2002 to 2004, Minaj rapped in a New York hip hop group called Hoodstars. The son of Bowlegged Lou from Full Force, Lou$tar, recruited Minaj when he and his father heard her work. Bowlegged Lou said that back then Minaj was already doing "the crazy voices" in her vocal performance. In 2004, the group recorded the entrance song for WWE Diva Victoria, "Don't Mess With", which was featured on the compilation album ThemeAddict: WWE The Music, Vol.6. After the group failed to secure a record deal, Full Force tried to connect Minaj with some record companies, including Warner Brothers, who expressed interest in signing Minaj out of the group but required a ghostwriter for a deal. Minaj rejected it, adamant that she will always write her songs. Brian George from Full Force said that Minaj was impressive in her ambition, describing her as "broke and hungry" while determined to be in control of her craft.

Minaj continued to work independently as a solo artist and uploaded her songs on her Myspace profile, sending several of them to people in the music industry. In 2006, Fendi, who owned the Brooklyn production company Dirty Money Entertainment, reached out to Minaj on Myspace, and signed her to Dirty Money under a 180-day contract. Her original stage name, Nicki Maraj, was changed to Nicki Minaj. Minaj wrote a number of songs, including "Itty Bitty Piggy" and "I Get Crazy", and booked shows in New York and New Jersey. She released her first mixtape, Playtime Is Over, on July 5, 2007. Her work was featured on the underground rap DVD The Come Up Vol. 11 and caught the attention of rapper Lil Wayne, who invited her to join his new Young Money crew. Minaj collaborated with Wayne, but she did not sign a contract with Young Money at that time. She continued working independently on her songs, communicating with fans on social media, and booking shows.

On April 12, 2008，Minaj released her second mixtape, Sucka Free. She released her third mixtape, Beam Me Up Scotty, on April 18, 2009, garnering favorable coverage. At the time, she was managed by Debra Antney. By 2009, Minaj's mixtapes, freestyles, and features on other artists' songs had garnered significant industry and public interest. The Beam Me Up Scotty track "I Get Crazy" reached number 20 on the U.S. Billboard Hot Rap Songs chart and number 37 on the Hot R&B/Hip-Hop Songs chart. In the summer of 2009, she performed on a tour headlined by Wayne featuring artists from Young Money, among others. There was a bidding war among record labels to sign her. In August, Minaj signed a recording contract with Young Money, with her deal entailing her owning her 360 rights, including her merchandising, sponsorships, endorsements, touring and publishing. In a 2011 interview, Minaj said that before she met Lil Wayne, the person who was guiding her in her career always told her, "'Don't be too playful, don't be too kooky and weird... no one's gonna feel that, nobody wants to hear that.' So I stifled a lot of that early on, and then once that we parted ways, I was like, 'Guess what, I'm gonna just be me.'" In October 2009, she performed a freestyle at the 2009 BET Hip Hop Awards cypher. The following month, she featured alongside Gucci Mane and Trina on the remix of "5 Star Bitch" by Yo Gotti.

=== 2010–2011: Breakthrough with Pink Friday ===
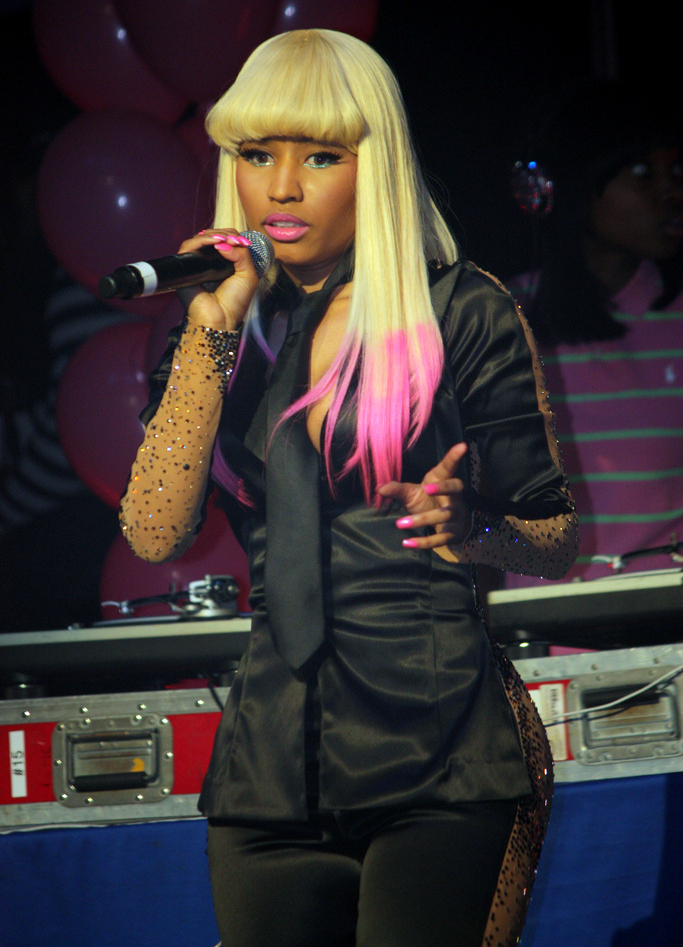
Minaj performing in 2010

In early February 2010, Minaj made her first two appearances on the U.S. Billboard Hot 100 chart with her features on "Knockout" and "Up Out My Face" by Lil Wayne and Mariah Carey respectively. Minaj also appeared on "BedRock" and "Roger That" from the compilation album We Are Young Money (2009). Robin Thicke featured Minaj on his single "Shakin' It 4 Daddy". On March 29, 2010, Minaj released "Massive Attack" featuring Sean Garrett. The song was thought to be Minaj's first single from her upcoming debut album, which she was still working on. However, it was not included on her album. Her next single, "Your Love", became the album's lead single. Released in June, it peaked at number 14 on the U.S. Billboard Hot 100 and number one on the Rap Songs chart.

The rapper was then featured on Christina Aguilera's song "Woohoo", which reached number 79 on Billboard Hot 100. In September, Minaj released "Check It Out" with will.i.am and "Right Thru Me" as follow-up singles.

In October 2010, Minaj featured on Kanye West's "Monster", a posse cut with Jay-Z and Rick Ross featuring vocals from Justin Vernon of Bon Iver. Her verse received widespread acclaim with many critics regarding it as the best verse on that song. Complex rated Minaj's "Monster" verse as the number-one best rap verse in the past five years, while Sean Fennessey of The Village Voice stated that "Monster" was "the track that announced Minaj's "brilliance" to most people." Shortly after, she performed "Monster" with West and Jay-Z at Yankee Stadium, becoming the first ever female rapper to perform there. That month, Minaj became the first female solo artist to have seven singles simultaneously charting in the U.S. In November, Minaj received her first Grammy Award nomination for her guest verse on Ludacris' song "My Chick Bad".

Pink Friday was released on November 19, 2010, debuting at number two and later reaching number one on the Billboard 200, with first-week sales of 375,000 copies. It had the largest sales week for a female rap album in the 21st century and second-highest sales week overall after Lauryn Hill's The Miseducation of Lauryn Hill (1998). The album also became the female rap album with the most weeks in the top ten on the Billboard 200 chart at the time, with fourteen consecutive weeks in the region. Upon release, the album received generally positive reviews from critics. The song "Roman's Revenge", featuring Eminem, was interpreted as a response to rapper Lil' Kim's comments against Minaj, including her accusing Minaj of copying her image and that she had recorded a song called "Everywhere We Go" with Minaj but it was pulled from iTunes by Cash Money because it did not perform well. At the time, Minaj said that "Roman's Revenge" was not about a specific person, but about "everyone who has been in interviews talking", adding, "I've been quiet for such a long time and I've been the nice guy. I've been the person that gave everyone their props ... you can't be a rapper and not speak on things being said about you". In a 2018 interview, she explained that she wrote the song after "a veteran got at me, and I hit them with 'Roman's Revenge' and then I kept on going."

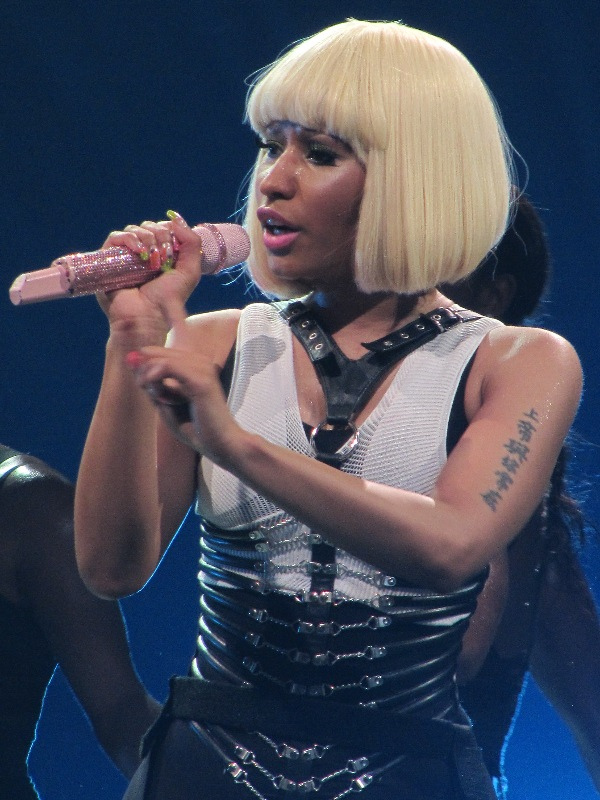
Minaj in 2011

Pink Friday was certified platinum by the Recording Industry Association of America (RIAA) in December 2010, for accumulating a million units in the United States. It became the first album by a solo female rapper to go platinum in seven years. As of March 2016, it has been certified triple-platinum. "Moment 4 Life" featuring Drake was released as the fourth single from Pink Friday, on December 7, 2010. It reached number 13 on the Hot 100. Minaj performed "Right Thru Me" and "Moment 4 Life" as the musical guest on the January 29, 2011, episode of Saturday Night Live. In February 2011, Lil' Kim released the mixtape Black Friday referencing Minaj, including artwork that showed Lil' Kim decapitating Minaj with a sword and the lyrics "sweetie, you goin' on your 14th minute of fame" and "you a Lil' Kim wannabe". Lil' Kim sold the mixtape on PayPal. Minaj's track "Tragedy" was released online, featuring the lyrics "Pink Friday, Eminem, 8 Mile/ It must hurt to sell your album on PayPal."

"Super Bass" was released as Pink Friday's fifth single in April 2011. It became a sleeper hit and commercially successful, ultimately peaking at number three on the Hot 100. It was eventually certified 12-times platinum in the US, for selling 12 million units; in 2024, it became the highest-certified song by a female rapper in RIAA history. "Super Bass" was the highest-charting solo single by a female rapper, at the time, since Missy Elliott's "Work It" in 2002. In 2017, Billboard ranked it as the second-biggest US Hot 100 hit by a female rapper of all time (behind Iggy Azalea's "Fancy"); and in 2024, ranked it as the biggest Hot 100 hit of Minaj's career. Its music video has over 1 billion views on YouTube, as of October 2023.

Minaj was one of the opening acts on Britney Spears' 2011 Femme Fatale Tour. She and Kesha appeared on the remix of Spears' "Till the World Ends", which peaked at number three in the U.S. On August 7, 2011, Minaj experienced a wardrobe malfunction during a live performance on Good Morning America when she revealed her left nipple. Both ABC and Minaj apologized for the incident, with Minaj denying it was a publicity stunt. Minaj continued to perform at high-profile events throughout 2011 with Donatella Versace inviting her to perform with Prince for the introduction of a Versace collection for H&M. She also performed "Super Bass" at the 2011 Victoria's Secret Fashion Show. In December 2011, Minaj was nominated for three Grammy Awards, including Best New Artist and Best Rap Album for Pink Friday. Also that year, she won the MTV Video Music Award for Best Hip-Hop Video for "Super Bass", marking her first VMA win. In 2022, the album was included in Rolling Stone's list of "200 Greatest Hip-Hop Albums of All Time" at number 31; the magazine stated that Pink Friday "proved you could own the charts without dialing back your confrontational individuality, and it set the table for a generation of artists." In 2024, Vibe named it as one of the "50 Greatest Black Albums of the Modern Era".

=== 2012–2013: Pink Friday: Roman Reloaded and American Idol ===
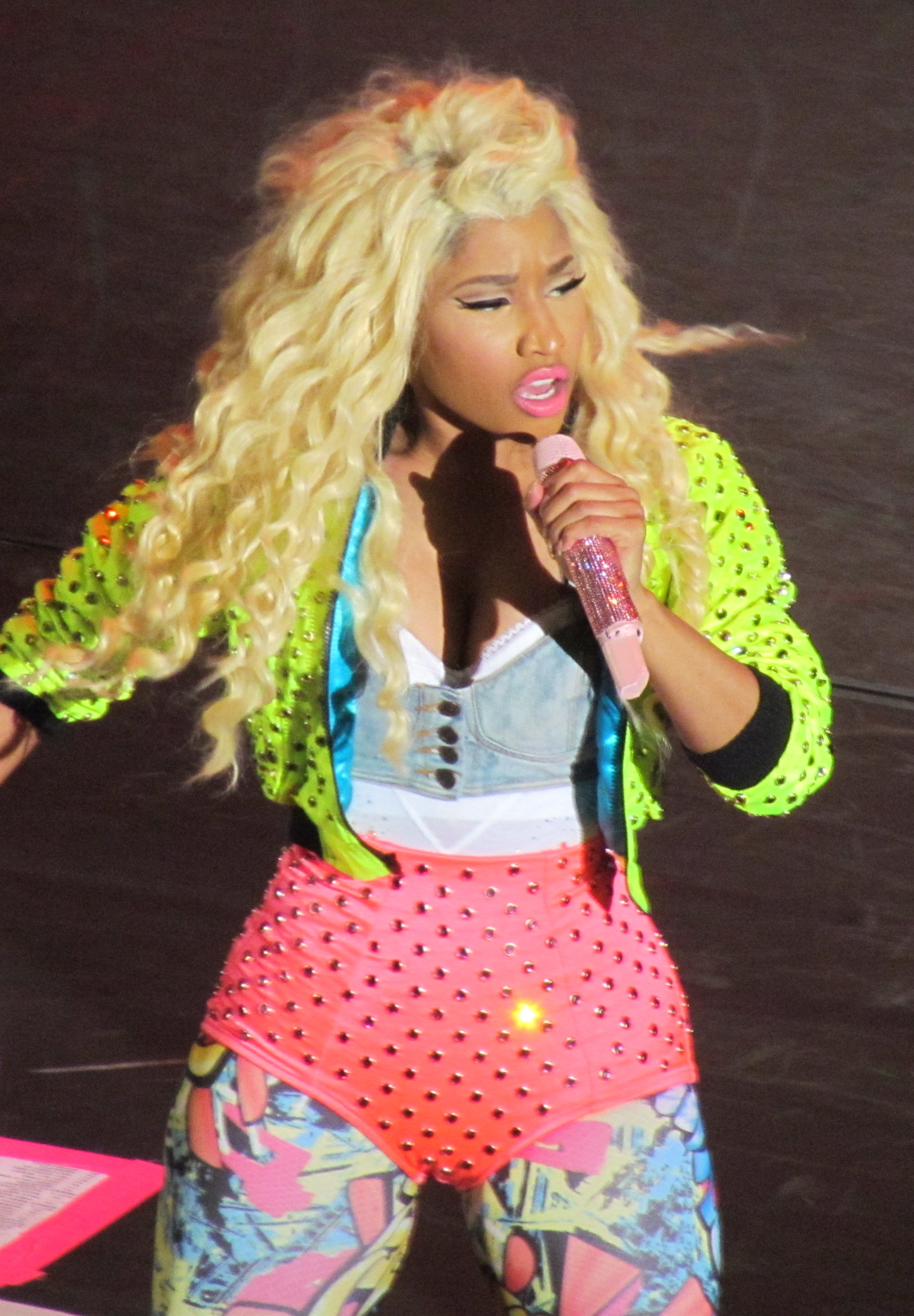
Minaj performing in the Hammersmith Apollo during 2012

"Starships" was released in February 2012 as the lead single from Minaj's forthcoming second album, Pink Friday: Roman Reloaded. The song reached number five on the US Billboard Hot 100, was the fifth best-selling single of 2012, and was certified diamond by the RIAA in November 2024, for moving over ten million units in the US. Her crossover into pop music was criticized by some, despite her commercial success. Follow-up singles "Beez in the Trap" featuring 2 Chainz and "Right by My Side" featuring Chris Brown were released shortly after.

Pink Friday: Roman Reloaded was eventually released on April 2, 2012, two months later than initially planned. It was preceded by the promotional singles "Roman in Moscow" and "Stupid Hoe". The latter song was viewed by critics as a diss aimed at Lil' Kim, following her previous attacks on Minaj. The album debuted at number one on the Billboard 200, with first-week sales of 253,000 copies, and was certified four-times platinum by the RIAA in November 2024, becoming Minaj's highest-certified album yet. However, the mix of hip-hop songs and mainstream pop material received mixed reviews. "Pound the Alarm" and "Va Va Voom" were later released as the final singles from the album. Minaj along with fellow rapper M.I.A. joined Madonna to perform the single, "Give Me All Your Luvin" during the Super Bowl XLVI halftime show on February 6, 2012. Minaj was the first solo female rapper to perform at the Grammy Awards, performing "Roman Holiday" during the 2012 ceremony on February 12. Her exorcism-themed performance was controversial, with the American Catholic League and its president criticizing her performance.

Minaj began her headlining Pink Friday Tour on May 16, 2012, which was followed by the Pink Friday: Reloaded Tour beginning October 14, 2012. Although she was scheduled to headline the June 3 Hot 97 Summer Jam at MetLife Stadium in New Jersey, at the request of Lil Wayne she canceled her appearance the day of the show after Peter Rosenberg of the station dismissed her single "Starships" as "not real hip-hop". The following month, she voiced Steffie in the animated film Ice Age: Continental Drift (2012). Minaj won awards for Best Female Video (for "Starships") at the 2012 MTV Video Music Awards and Best Hip-Hop at the 2012 MTV Europe Music Awards.

An expanded version of Pink Friday: Roman Reloaded, subtitled The Re-Up, was released on November 19, 2012, with seven new songs. That month, she was the subject of a three-part E! documentary titled Nicki Minaj: My Truth. In September, Minaj joined the judges' panel for the twelfth season of American Idol with Mariah Carey, Keith Urban, and Randy Jackson. Throughout the show there were disagreements between Carey and Minaj, with both of them leaving the series at the end of the season. Pink Friday: Roman Reloaded was the best-selling rap album released in 2012 in the US. It was also the 25th-best-selling album globally in 2012, with over 1.4 million copies sold worldwide, according to the International Federation of the Phonographic Industry (IFPI). In 2013, Minaj became the most-charted female rapper on the Billboard Hot 100 at the time, with 44 entries, and tied Carey as seventh among female artists.

=== 2014–2017: The Pinkprint and acting ventures ===
Minaj's first live-action theatrical film The Other Woman was filmed in spring 2013 and premiered on April 25, 2014. As she was working on her third studio album The Pinkprint, she described the album as "a continuation of The Re-Up with a lot more" and said it would focus on her "hip hop roots". During an MTV interview, she said that she has "much to talk about" in the album.

"Pills n Potions" was released as the lead single from The Pinkprint in May 2014. In July, she appeared on the song "Bang Bang" with singers Jessie J and Ariana Grande, which peaked at number three on the US Billboard Hot 100 and marked Minaj's first number-one on the UK singles chart. "Bang Bang" was certified diamond by the RIAA in May 2024, for recognized sales of 10 million units; it became the first all-female collaboration to achieve the certification. Its music video garnered over two billion views on YouTube. "Anaconda" was released in August as the second single from the album, peaking at number two, which became her highest-charting single in the US at the time. Its ascent from number 39 to number two in its third week marked the second-biggest jump within the chart's top 40 region, at the time. The music video for "Anaconda" went viral upon release online; it set a 24-hour Vevo record, accumulating 19.6 million views on its first day of release, breaking the record previously held by Miley Cyrus's "Wrecking Ball". It surpassed one billion views on YouTube. On November 9, 2014, Minaj hosted the 2014 MTV Europe Music Awards in Glasgow, Scotland. She also won the Best Hip-Hop Award for a second time.

The Pinkprint was officially released on December 15, 2014, and debuted at number two in the U.S., with first week sales of 244,000 equivalent units (198,000 in pure album sales and 46,000 combined album-equivalent units and streams). Upon release, critics praised the production and personal lyrics. At the 58th Grammy Awards, Minaj received three more Grammy Award nominations, including a second Best Rap Album nomination for The Pinkprint, a Best Rap Song nomination for "Anaconda" and a Best Pop Duo/Group Performance nomination for "Bang Bang". In March 2015, Minaj embarked on her third world tour entitled The Pinkprint Tour and also became the first female artist to chart four songs simultaneously in the top 10 of Billboard's Mainstream R&B/Hip-Hop airplay chart. At the 2015 BET Awards, Minaj won her sixth consecutive award for Best Female Hip-Hop Artist, becoming the female rapper with most wins in that category. In August 2015, Madame Tussauds unveiled a wax figure of Minaj, which depicted a pose from the "Anaconda" music video. Minaj voiced her approval of the wax figure on social media. The wax figure received criticism from some, including Angharad Welsh of The Independent, who called it "a sexist, racist mistake".

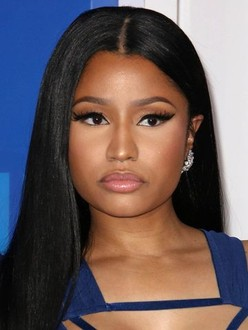
Minaj in 2016

In May 2015, it was announced that Minaj would feature in the third installment of the Barbershop film series, alongside Ice Cube, Cedric the Entertainer, Eve, and other original cast members. Titled Barbershop: The Next Cut, the film was released on April 15, 2016. For Minaj's performance as a "sassy" hairdresser named Draya, she was nominated for a Teen Choice Award for Choice Movie Actress: Comedy. In September 2015, it was announced that Minaj would executive produce and appear in a scripted single-camera comedy series for ABC Family based on her life growing up in Queens, New York City. The show was titled Nicki and the pilot episode was filmed in Minaj's hometown in January 2016. In October 2016, Minaj stated the filming was postponed for undisclosed reasons.

In February 2017, Minaj featured on Gucci Mane's song "Make Love" and Jason Derulo's single "Swalla" alongside Ty Dolla Sign, the latter of which reached the top ten in several countries, including a peak of number six in the UK. Rapper Remy Ma released the diss track "Shether", which, among other claims and insults, alleged that Minaj used a ghostwriter and was in a 360-record deal. The track's release followed interviews where Remy Ma had praised Minaj, rapped over a couple of Minaj's songs, and released tracks that media interpreted as digs at Minaj. Remy Ma also released a second diss track aimed at Minaj, "Another One". Minaj responded in her single "No Frauds", featuring Drake and Lil Wayne, in which, among other digs, she took shots at Remy Ma's prison stint for assault, called her a "fraud committin' perjury", and accused her of using a ghostwriter, referring to her husband, rapper Papoose; Minaj also rapped "I never signed a 360, bitch you wild dumb". On her Instagram post promoting the song, Minaj wrote: "Great diss records can't be lies. Great diss records are FACTS ... Been writing my own raps since I was 11." "No Frauds" was one of three songs Minaj released simultaneously, along with "Changed It" and "Regret in Your Tears". On March 20, 2017, with the three songs she released, Minaj broke the record for the most Billboard Hot 100 entries for a female artist, which at the time was previously held by Aretha Franklin. That month, Minaj also signed with the major modeling agency, Wilhelmina Models. Minaj had previously modelled for and been the face of several high-profile designer brands before signing with Wilhelmina Models.

In May 2017, Minaj opened the 2017 Billboard Music Awards with a medley performance that was described by Elias Leight of Rolling Stone as "flamboyantly produced" and "dexterous". Throughout the remainder of 2017, Minaj performed guest verses on several singles, including Migos' "MotorSport" and Yo Gotti's "Rake It Up", both of which peaked in the top ten in the U.S., at numbers six and eight, respectively. She also featured on Katy Perry's "Swish Swish", which was certified platinum in the U.S. and Canada. Minaj's recording contract with Young Money expired in 2017.

=== 2018–2019: Queen ===
After a social media hiatus, Minaj released two singles from her fourth studio album Queen. She released "Chun-Li" and "Barbie Tingz" simultaneously on April 12, 2018, with both reaching number ten and number twenty-five in the US respectively. She performed "Chun-Li" on Saturday Night Live and the 2018 BET Awards. While "Chun Li" appears on the tracklist of the album, "Barbie Tingz" is only included on the Target version of the album. On the red carpet of the 2018 Met Gala, she announced the title of the album and the original release date. "Rich Sex" featuring Lil Wayne was released on June 11, 2018, as the first promotional single from Queen. The second single, "Bed", featuring Ariana Grande was released on June 14, 2018, alongside the album pre-order, reaching number 42 on the Hot 100. Additionally, Minaj appeared as a featured artist on the song "Fefe" along with Murda Beatz and Tekashi 6ix9ine. It debuted at number four in the US, marking Minaj's highest debut on the chart at the time, besting the sixth place start of "Bang Bang" in 2014. It later peaked at number three and was added to Queen in the middle of its first tracking week. The day before the album's release, Minaj launched her own Beats 1 (now branded as Apple Music 1) radio show, Queen Radio. It became the most-listened radio show on Apple Music in 2019, and ran for 17 episodes till February 2020. Guests on the show included Ariana Grande, 50 Cent, and Chance the Rapper, among others.

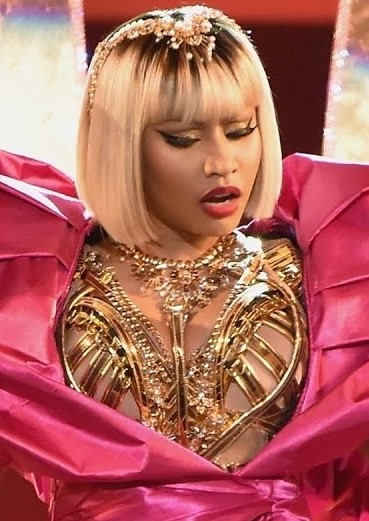
Minaj performing at the 2018 MTV Video Music Awards

Queen received multiple delays before finally being released on August 10, 2018. It debuted at number two on the U.S. Billboard 200 with 185,000 album-equivalent units, of which 78,000 came from pure album sales. It also debuted at number five in the UK and at number four in Australia, marking Minaj's highest debut in the latter country. Minaj later expressed frustration and criticized several people including Travis Scott, whose album Astroworld claimed the top spot for a second week in a row, blocking Queen from the top spot. Minaj alleged that Travis Scott sold shirts, merchandise, and ticket passes for an unnannounced tour to boost his album sales. This controversy and Queen's roll-out was documented by several news outlets and commentators. Queen received generally positive reviews, with some critics deriding the album's length and direction. The album was certified Platinum by the RIAA in January 2019, for moving over 1 million equivalent units.

Minaj performed at the 2018 MTV Video Music Awards where she also won her fourth MTV Video Music Award for the "Chun-Li" music video. The same month, she featured on the remix of "Idol" by South Korean boy band BTS. It debuted and peaked at number eleven in the U.S. which was the group's second highest-charting song at the time. She also featured on the song "Woman Like Me" by British girl group Little Mix, which was released on October 12, 2018. A music video was shortly released after, with Minaj and Little Mix later performing the song together at the 2018 MTV Europe Music Awards. She was also featured on "Dip" by American rapper Tyga which reached number sixty-three in the U.S. making her the first female artist to have 100 entries on the Billboard Hot 100 chart. She later attended the year-end Billboard Women in Music event, receiving the Game Changer Award for the accomplishment.

In September, Minaj co-headlined the annual Made in America Festival and suffered another wardrobe malfunction when the front of her outfit fell open. In November, she was invited to the DWP music festival in China but did not perform due to problems with the company hosting the event. The next year in April 2019, Minaj made a surprise guest appearance at the 2019 Coachella Valley Music and Arts Festival during Ariana Grande's set where they performed their collaborations "Side to Side" and "Bang Bang". However, she experienced technical difficulties with her earpiece. Later that month, Minaj parted ways with her longtime management team after a mutual agreement, with American entertainment executive Irving Azoff serving as her new manager.

In June 2019, Minaj released a standalone single titled "Megatron" along with an accompanying music video. In the U.S., the song debuted at number twenty. A month later, she provided information on her upcoming fifth studio album, appearing on The Tonight Show Starring Jimmy Fallon, stating that "there's definitely a new album, of course." She featured on the song "Hot Girl Summer" alongside fellow female rapper Megan Thee Stallion in August 2019, which reached number eleven in the U.S. Minaj had a voice role as Pinky in The Angry Birds Movie 2, which was released in August 2019. In November, Minaj appeared on the Charlie's Angels: Original Motion Picture Soundtrack on the song "Bad To You", along with Ariana Grande and Normani, marking her sixth collaboration with Grande. Minaj also collaborated with Colombian singer Karol G on the song "Tusa", which was released to streaming platforms on November 7. The song reached forty-two in the U.S. and reached the top of many other charts including the "Hot Latin Songs" chart, which made it the first song with two lead female artists to debut in such position. "Tusa" later became the longest-running number one single in Argentina, spending five months on the top of the chart.

=== 2020–2021: Beam Me Up Scotty re-release ===
In January 2020, Minaj was featured on "Nice to Meet Ya" by American singer-songwriter Meghan Trainor. In February, she released a standalone song called "Yikes" as a promotional single. By the end of that month, Minaj appeared as a guest judge on the twelfth season's premiere of the reality television show RuPaul's Drag Race. In May, fellow rapper Doja Cat announced a collaboration with Minaj on two remixes of her song "Say So". The remix later debuted at number one on the U.S. Billboard Hot 100, becoming both Minaj and Doja Cat's first single to reach number one in the U.S. It became the first collaboration between two female rappers to reach number one in the U.S., and the first female artist collaboration to top the chart since "Fancy" by Australian rapper Iggy Azalea featuring English singer Charli XCX did it in 2014. A month later, she released a collaboration with 6ix9ine called "Trollz", which debuted at number one in the U.S. becoming her second number one single. This made her the first female rapper to debut at number one on the Billboard Hot 100 since Lauryn Hill did so in 1998 with "Doo Wop (That Thing)".

Minaj featured on singer Ty Dolla Sign's track "Expensive" in August 2020. She continued to appear as a featured artist on several songs in late 2020 and released "What That Speed Bout!?" with producer Mike Will Made It and rapper YoungBoy Never Broke Again on November 6. She was the most-streamed female rapper of the year on Spotify. On the 10th anniversary of her debut album Pink Friday (2010), Minaj announced a six-part docuseries about her, produced by Bron Studios and was originally said to premiere on HBO Max. In 2022, the streaming platform confirmed it dropped the still-unreleased project.

In May 2021, Minaj released a reissue of her mixtape Beam Me Up Scotty (2009), including new songs previously unavailable on streaming services. The reissue debuted at number two on the U.S. Billboard 200, which gave it the highest debut for a female rap mixtape in the U.S. A song from the reissue, titled "Seeing Green" featuring fellow Young Money rappers Drake and Lil Wayne reached number twelve in the U.S. In July, Minaj collaborated with fellow rapper Bia on the remix of her song Whole Lotta Money. In September, Minaj collaborated with English singer-songwriter Elton John's fifth collaboration album The Lockdown Sessions (2021). She appeared on the song "Always Love You" with John and rapper Young Thug. Later that month, she split with her previous manager Irving Azoff and is now being managed by Wassim Slaiby, also known by his management company SALXCO, who is best known for managing The Weeknd and Doja Cat. English singer Jesy Nelson released her solo debut, called "Boyz", which Minaj features on. The song peaked at number four in the UK and number sixteen in Ireland. In October 2021, Minaj appeared as a surprise host for the season six reunion of the reality television show The Real Housewives of Potomac. In November 2021, her 2011 Pink Friday single "Super Bass" received a Diamond certification by the Recording Industry Association of America (RIAA), making her the second solo female rapper to receive a diamond certification. Minaj won the Best Hip Hop award in the MTV Europe Music Awards 2021, becoming the sixth time she has won this award.

=== 2022–present: Pink Friday 2 ===
After a social media hiatus, Minaj released a song collaboration with rapper Lil Baby titled "Do We Have a Problem?" on February 4, 2022. It debuted at number two on the US Billboard Hot 100, marking Minaj's 20th top-ten. On the Billboard Global 200, it debuted at number seven, earning Minaj her first top-ten on the chart. Another Lil Baby collaboration titled "Bussin" was released a week later, on February 11. In an Apple Music interview with DJ Zane Lowe, Minaj said her forthcoming fifth studio album was "coming very soon". She described it as "fun, gutta, and back to the basics". In March, Minaj and fellow rapper Coi Leray's collaboration "Blick Blick" was released—from the former's debut studio album, Trendsetter (2022). Later that month, Minaj surprise-released the standalone single "We Go Up" featuring rapper Fivio Foreign. ln April, she appeared on English television host James Corden's Carpool Karaoke segment, kickstarting the return of its broadcast on The Late Late Show with James Corden after a two-year hiatus. In July, Minaj headlined the 2022 editions of Essence Music Festival in New Orleans and the Wireless Festival in London. On July 28, she released a two-minute trailer of her upcoming six-part docuseries titled "Nicki", produced by Canadian production company Bron Studios. Minaj's radio show Queen Radio was revived and broadcast on Amp, a live audio service by Amazon, over two years after its conclusion on Beats 1. The show premiered on August 11 on Amp; episodes were made available on Amazon Music after airing live. It was discontinued in October 2023, as a result of the closure of Amp.

"Super Freaky Girl", the lead single from Minaj's upcoming album, was released on August 12, 2022. Debuting atop the Billboard Hot 100, it marked Minaj's third US number-one, her first solo chart-topper, and the first solo song by a female rapper to debut at number one in the US in the 21st century. Minaj spoke on Instagram Live about her frustration with the song, which samples Rick James's 1981 song "Super Freak", being considered in the pop categories instead of rap for the 65th Annual Grammy Awards. Naming other examples of category mismatches, she said that if the song was not considered fitting for the rap category, Latto's "Big Energy", which has the same producer, would also not be suitable for the category. Minaj argued that her song was moved to pop to have less competition in the rap categories, alleging that it is part of a general corporate agenda to prop up newer artists over veterans. She added that she would have no problem with it being moved from rap to pop if they were "all being treated fairly".

On August 26, Minaj released her first greatest hits album titled Queen Radio: Volume 1, containing various songs from her previous projects and one new track, "Likkle Miss (Remix)" with Skeng. It debuted at number ten on the Billboard 200 with 32,000 units. Through the remainder of the year, Minaj appeared as a co-lead or featured artist on various collaborations: Yung Bleu's "Love in the Way", a remix of "Likkle Miss" called "The Fine Nine Remix" featuring eight female rappers, and YoungBoy Never Broke Again's "I Admit". The following month, Minaj collaborated with Lebanese singer Myriam Fares and Colombian singer Maluma on "Tukoh Taka" which was the official 2022 FIFA Fan Festival anthem. Minaj emceed the 2022 MTV Video Music Awards with LL Cool J and Jack Harlow, and hosted the 2023 ceremony. At the former ceremony, she received the Michael Jackson Video Vanguard Award and performed a medley of her hits as the recipient.

On March 5, 2023, Minaj appeared as a surprise performer during Lil Wayne's set at the Rolling Loud California festival. In April, she teamed up with Ice Spice on the remix to the latter's song "Princess Diana"—the first-ever release on Minaj's record label imprint, Heavy On It. Peaking at number four on the Hot 100, the remix became the first collaboration between two women to top the Hot Rap Songs chart and made Minaj the woman with the most number-ones on the chart (10). In April and May, she also featured on YoungBoy Never Broke Again's "WTF", German singer Kim Petras's "Alone", and "Pound Town 2", the remix to rapper Sexyy Red and Tay Keith's single, "Pound Town". In June, Minaj and Ice Spice released their second collaboration, "Barbie World" with Europop band Aqua, from the Barbie film soundtrack. The song samples Aqua's 1997 single, "Barbie Girl". It reached number seven on the Hot 100 and extended Minaj's record as the female rapper with the most US top-tens (23). Minaj made guest appearances on Young Thug's "Money" with the late Juice Wrld, and Lil Uzi Vert's "Endless Fashion", which charted in the top 20. In October, she released "For All the Barbz", her freestyle of Drake's "All the Parties" (featuring Chief Keef), exclusively via her YouTube channel. With the 2023 MTV Europe Music Awards, she became the first black artist and female rapper to win Best US Act in the award show's history. In December, Minaj performed on the Atlanta and Miami dates of iHeartRadio's Jingle Ball Tour 2023. She conducted a New Year's Eve concert at the E11Even nightclub in Miami.

Minaj's fifth studio album, Pink Friday 2 was released on December 8, 2023, her birthday, after multiple date delays. She released it solely through Republic Records, following the completion of her recording contract with Young Money. The sequel to her debut album Pink Friday, it is primarily a hip-hop, R&B and pop rap record featuring several collaborations, and received generally favorable reviews from critics. The album debuted atop the Billboard 200, with 228,000 album-equivalent units, marking Minaj's first album since 2012 to do so. The album broke multiple records, including making Minaj the female rapper with the most US number-one albums (3) in chart history, earning the highest first-week vinyl sales for a female rap album in history, Fourteen tracks from the album appeared on the Billboard Hot 100, two of which charted in the top 40—"Everybody" featuring Lil Uzi Vert and "Needle" featuring Drake. Two deluxe versions of Pink Friday 2 were released. The album was certified platinum by the RIAA in March 2024.

"Red Ruby da Sleeze" was released as the album's second single in March 2023, followed by the third single "Last Time I Saw You" in September 2023. "Everybody" and "FTCU" became subsequent singles in January 2024; "Red Ruby da Sleeze" and "FTCU" reached the top 15 on the Hot 100. On January 26, 2024, Megan Thee Stallion released the song "Hiss", which was believed to include jabs at Minaj and her husband. Soon after, Minaj did an Instagram live where she previewed a rap she made on the live, titled "Big Foot", which was released on January 28. The song broke first-day records for the highest solo female rap debut in Apple Music history, and the biggest solo female rap debut on Spotify and YouTube in 2024. It debuted at number 23 on the Billboard Hot 100. The song also extended Minaj's record as the female rapper with the most, and woman with the second-most, top-tens (46) on the Hot R&B/Hip-Hop Songs chart, behind Aretha Franklin (52).

In support of Pink Friday 2, Minaj embarked on its namesake world tour, her most extensive tour yet, from March to October 2024. The tour included her headlining slots at ten festivals. It concluded as the highest-grossing tour by a female rapper in history and the fourth-highest-grossing tour by a rapper or hip hop artist at the time, with over $108 million in revenue, based on the first 70 shows. In December 2025, RapTV ranked it as the sixth-highest-grossing tour of all time by a rap or hip–hop artist. It was nominated for Hip-Hop Tour of the Year at the 2025 Pollstar Awards. Minaj was nominated for Best Rap Song and Best Song Written for Visual Media, along with Ice Spice, for "Barbie World" at the 66th Annual Grammy Awards. She led the nominations among women for the BET Awards 2024, with six, and won Best Female Hip Hop Artist—her seventh win in the category, and first since 2016. At the 2024 BET Hip Hop Awards, Pink Friday 2 became the first album by a solo woman to win Album of the Year. Minaj was set to release a deluxe version of the album, titled Gag City Reloaded, but announced in September 2024 that she had scrapped it in favor of making her sixth studio album.

== Artistry ==
=== Influences ===
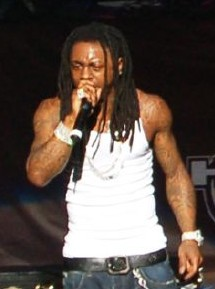
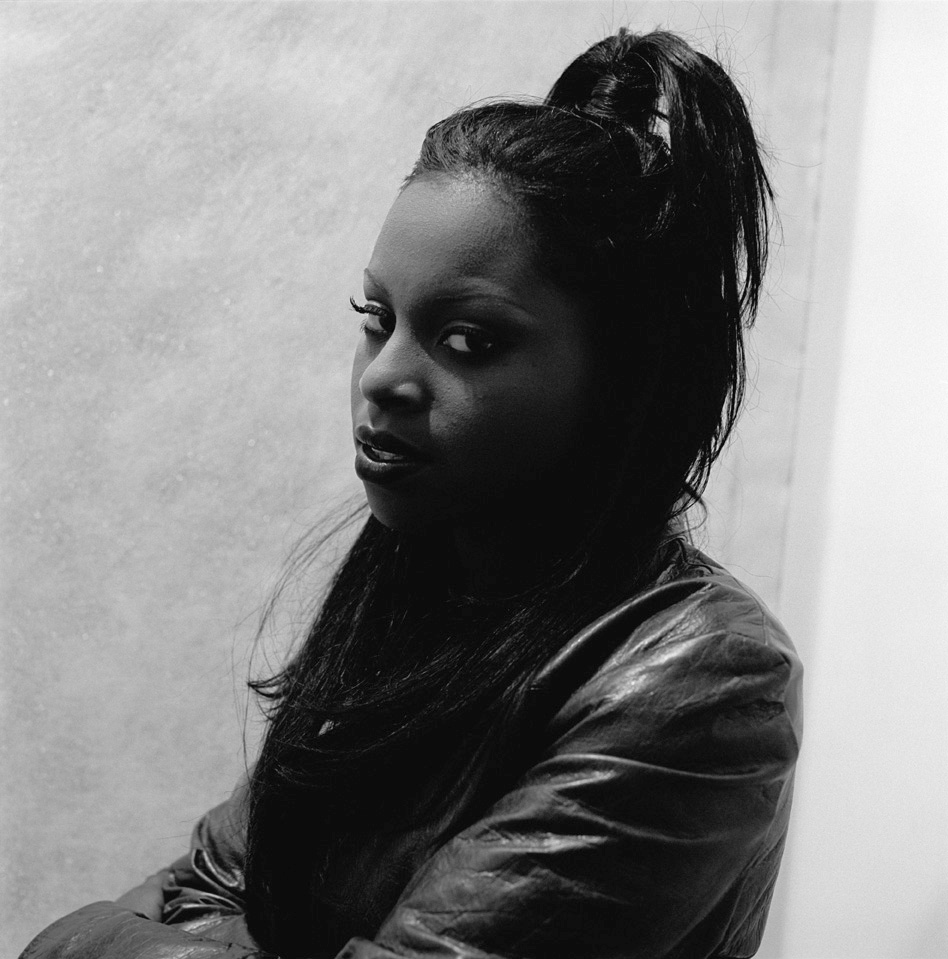
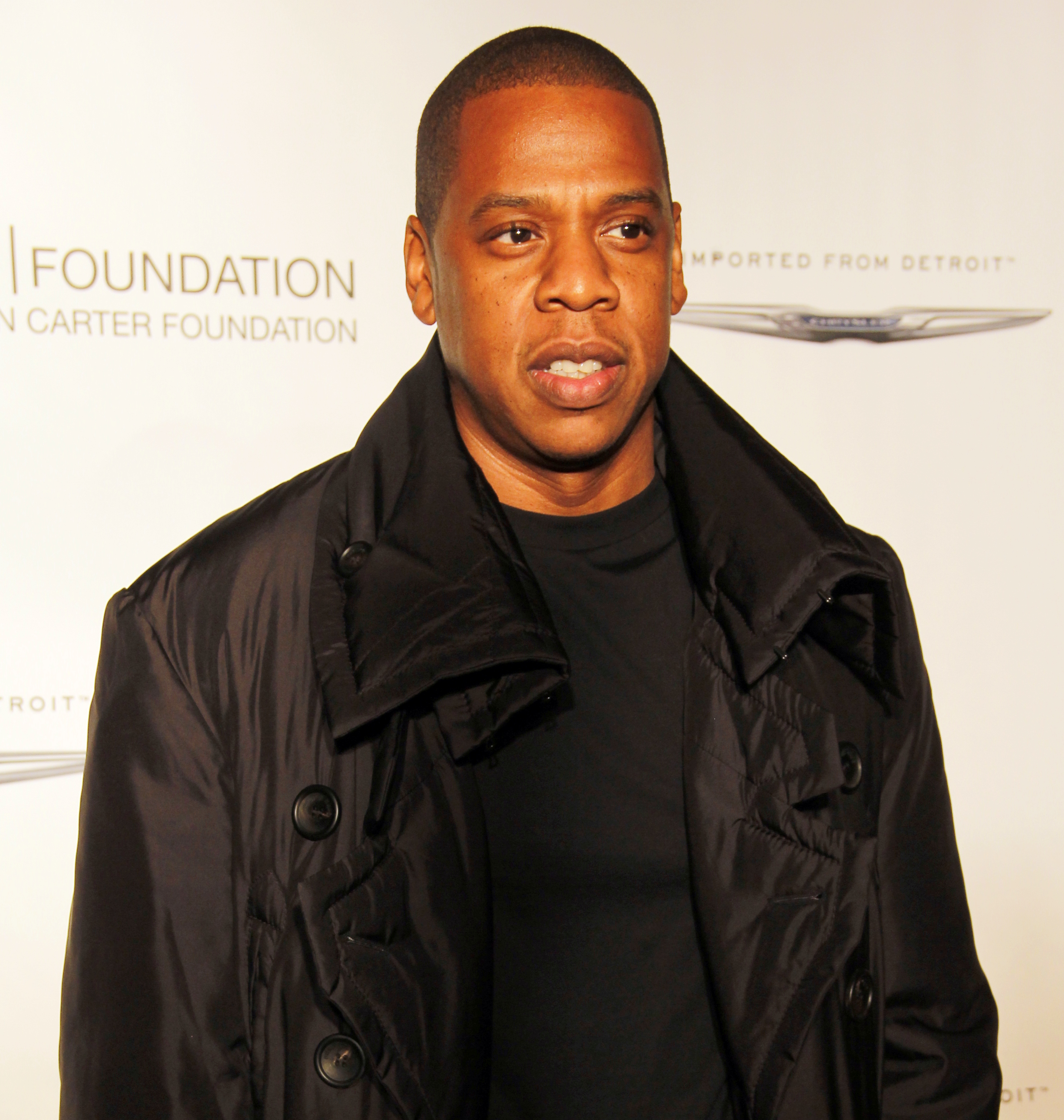
Minaj called rappers Lil Wayne (left), Foxy Brown (center), and Jay-Z (right) her three biggest influences.

Minaj cited Lil Wayne, Foxy Brown, Jay-Z, and Biggie as major influences. She said, "I can't even imagine my career, my creative spirit without Wayne". On Foxy Brown and Jay-Z, Minaj stated: "I really loved [Foxy] as a female rapper. I was really interested in her mind and her aura, [and] I was really, really into Jay-Z. Me and my friends in high school, we were reciting all of the Jay lyrics." She deemed Foxy Brown "the most influential female rapper" for her.

Minaj also cited Slick Rick, Doug E. Fresh, Lauryn Hill, Salt-N-Pepa, Snoop Dogg, Eazy-E, and Tupac as influences. Other artists she mentioned as inspirations included R&B singer Monica, Beyoncé, Whitney Houston, Madonna, and Enya. Other female rappers she listened to included Eve, MC Lyte, Left Eye, Lil' Kim, Remy Ma, and Missy Elliott.

Minaj called Betsey Johnson a fashion inspiration: "[Betsey] is a free spirit. When I met her the other day, I felt like I knew her for my whole life. ... She's amazingly talented and I've been wearing her clothes forever." Minaj also expressed appreciation for Cyndi Lauper's style and how her videos inspired her as a teenager: "When I first went to get my hair colored, I was about 14 and I wanted blonde highlights. ... I've always been experimenting. Cyndi Lauper's videos – that's what intrigued me." Other fashion influences include Janet Jackson, Salt-N-Pepa, Grace Jones, Lil' Kim, and Marilyn Monroe. She also mentioned that actress Jada Pinkett Smith was one of her role models.

=== Musical style and lyrics ===
Minaj is known for her animated rap flow, witty lyrics, and musical versatility. Her rapping is distinctive for its varying cadence and speed, and use of alter egos and accents, including British cockney. In 2010, Minaj said that she aimed to be "a balanced artist ... this is all years of me learning me and my style, and deciding to do something different that would get everyone's attention." She stated that animation and performance was always a part of her and came naturally in her artistry, and her performing arts background also contributed to it. She regards rapping as both an art and a sport, enjoys changing up her rap flow, and sometimes spends hours revising her work. "I love that people never know what Nicki they are going to get on a particular song. I like bringing out a different side."

Minaj has made use of metaphors, punch lines, and word play. She often incorporates personas, using different accents or cadences. Marc Hogan of Spin said that through her character Roman, Minaj "tap[ped] into the fire-breathing, giddily nihilistic spirit that drew so many rap heads to her mixtapes ... as well as her guest appearances on others' tracks. Jon Caramanica of The New York Times called Minaj a "nimble, evocative rapper" and "intricate lyricist" with a "gift for comic accents and unexpected turns of phrase. She's a walking exaggeration, outsize in sound, personality and look. And she's a rapid evolver, discarding old modes as easily as adopting new ones." PopMatters' Nick Soulsby called her lyrics and delivery "a firework display of sharp metaphors, humorous comebacks and putdowns, a rainbow of emotion backed up by a talent for wordplay", adding that "while many rappers lean into a single style from start-to-end of a song — or even a career — Minaj is alive to the potential of her performances and challenges herself on the mic". Writing for Paper magazine, Liza Dye said that Minaj's first mixtape "established her lyrical talent and knack for creating a colorful world filled with witty rap references, vocal impressions and memorable characters." The New York Times' Roxane Gay characterized Minaj's work by "urgent lyrics, spitting in a range of voices and accents", containing "wit and sly humor", and her raps ranging "from bold and aggressive, to coquettish, to wanton and sultry, with a soupçon of women's empowerment", while her pace "is often breathless but her diction is impeccable."

AllMusic described her artistry as a "unique combination of ferocity and humor, and a rap style built on razor-sharp wordplay, mercilessly blunt lyricism, and delivery that turns on a dime from sugary to snarling". Evening Standard's Jochan Embley wrote that her lyrics "stare gender and race in the eye", and are "fierce, hilarious, bombastic and deadly serious, often all bundled together in one. If she's not taking aim at other rappers ... she's promoting body confidence or providing a commentary on social issues." Complex said that Minaj has written bars that are "as insulting as they [are] clever", and praised her versatility as a rapper "with varied flows, ranging from sing-song to pummeling, and lines as personal as they [are] provocative", noting that "she could go as pop as she wants, but for Minaj, it all returns to rap." Tara Colley of The Conversation described Minaj as a "pre-eminent female rapper", writing that she "consistently straddled the distinct personas of gangsta boss and sexy pop siren without truly committing to either" and her "chameleonic ability" yields debate on which version of Minaj rap fans prefer. Writing for Esquire, Terron Moore said that one of Minaj's traits as an artist is her "fearlessness", a staple of "Nicki the Lyricist, the venomous, schizophrenic man eater who out-pens her male competitors, and her trail of guest verses". Robby Seabrook III of XXL included Minaj in a list of "most unique flows from rappers over the last five years", writing that she "has solidified her spot as a leader of the pack for her animated flows, inspiring many other women in hip-hop to play with their vocals. She goes from campy to bellicose, excited to eccentric, oftentimes all on one song."

As a hip-hop artist, Minaj's discography comprises various styles and sounds fused with the genre, such as pop and R&B. Several of her albums have been described as genre-blending. Minaj occasionally lends herself to electronic music genres, with Pink Friday marking her exploration of the genre, spawning the electropop-laden "Super Bass". Also combining hip hop with electronic music, Minaj's second album, Pink Friday Roman Reloaded, has several electro-rap and electro pop songs including "Roman Holiday", "Beez in the Trap", and "Starships". (Note: Roman Reloaded electronic songs:) Zoe Johnson of XXL, stated in 2021 that in recent years Minaj's "beat selection has moved to refined production full of grit and hip-hop flare". Her fifth album Pink Friday 2 incorporates drill, pop, dancehall, afrobeats, R&B, Jersey club, and trap.

=== Alter egos ===
With her parents frequently fighting during her childhood, Minaj lived through characters she created as a means of escape. She recalled that "fantasy was my reality" and her first identity was Cookie. She then moved on to Harajuku Barbie and, later, Nicki Minaj. In November 2010, Minaj assumed the alter ego Nicki Teresa, wearing a colorful headdress and calling herself "healer to her fans" during a visit to the Garden of Dreams Foundation at Fuse Studios in New York. She introduced another alter ego, Rosa (pronounced with an exaggerated R), to commemorate her December 2010 appearance on Lopez Tonight.

One of Minaj's most well-known alter-egos is Roman Zolanski, whom Minaj described as a "demon", a "lunatic", and a gay boy that lives inside of her. On "Roman's Revenge", Minaj and Eminem collaborated as their respective alter egos Roman and Slim Shady. Minaj also introduced the character of Roman's proper British mother, Martha, in "Roman's Revenge". In December 2023, in response to a fan inquiry on Martha ever returning, Minaj confirmed that Martha had died of old age. Minaj's other personas in her music include Chun-Li and Queen Sleeze.

== Legacy ==
Various publications have referred to Minaj as the "Queen of Rap" and the "Queen of Hip Hop". She is also regarded as one of the most influential rappers of all time. In 2012, Jon Caramanica of The New York Times called Minaj "the most influential female rapper of all time", and in 2015 Vanessa Grigoriadis from its magazine called her "the world's biggest female rap superstar". In 2019, Complex ranked her eighth on their list of best rappers of the 2010s, the only female rapper on the list, calling Minaj "the most important female rapper of this decade—and quite possibly of all time", and a "trendsetter" who "continuously redefin[es] what it means to be a crossover rapper." Minaj was ranked as the tenth-greatest rapper and greatest female rapper of all time on Billboard and Vibe's list of the 50 greatest rappers (2023). In 2024, Billboard stated that while "hip-hop has continued to cycle through rappers looking to knock Minaj off the throne", she "remains at the apex of the rap mountain 15 years after the release of her breakout mixtape, Beam Me Up Scotty". The Source described Minaj as "one of the most influential figures in the global music scene", noting that she "has consistently redefined US rap/hip-hop since her debut album Pink Friday".

Minaj's work and career has been deemed groundbreaking by multiple publications. In Evening Standard, Jochan Embley named her one of the most influential rap artists of all time, writing that she "repeatedly [broke] down barriers for female artists in the scene" and "everything she does is bold, fearless and distinct – whether that be her eye-popping stage attire or her expertly delivered lyrics". Sowmya Krishnamurthy of NPR Music said that "in a genre where men dominate the uppermost echelon", Minaj "indelibly changed the landscape for artists in hip-hop for the past decade, showing a complex visage: the ferocious emcee who's just as comfortable being the girl-next-door, glammed-up Barbie doll or rambunctious alter-ego Roman". In 2020, Nick Soulsby of PopMatters called her the "best female rapper and the best rapper of the past ten years – no gender preposition required." Billboard said she "redefined success for women in hip-hop" in the decade. MTV Latin America named her as one of "The Most Influential Women in the History of Music", being the only rapper on the list. In 2024, Billboard ranked Minaj at number 13 on its "Greatest Pop Stars of the 21st Century" list, with Kyle Denis writing she "isn't just the greatest female rapper [...] she's also one of the key architects of how pop music sounds, how pop fandom functions and how pop stars are perceived". Her success as a female rapper "has been a landmark step towards gender equality in the rap industry", Bustle remarked. Nylon writer Demicia Inman said her impact "stands as one of the most successful rappers of the millennium", while she "was required not just to rap well beyond her male peers, but also to be likable. In rejecting respectability politics, [Minaj] in-turn fueled a landmark career", during which she has "battled misogyny and industry bias against black women to carve her own identity and sound" and "highlighted and helped shift double standards".

The New York Times's Caramanica wrote that Minaj became "a nimble, evocative rapper, an intricate lyricist, a thoughtful singer, a risky performer", and "invented new personae". "More than any other rapper in the mainstream, she pushed hard against expectations", becoming "her own watermark". NPR's Erik Nielson said in 2014 that Minaj's "success over the last decade has stood as an exception to the unwritten rule that women rappers no longer have a place among elite artists". Complex stated that "from her bold outfits to her multi-colored wigs, Minaj oozed confidence that inspired others who were watching closely". Glamour included Minaj in its list of 104 women who defined 2010s pop culture. XXL's Zoe Johnson called her "one of the most versatile MCs to bless a mic", adding that she "helped birth a new generation of rappers that mimic her style and revamp her legendary bars. She's even helped pave the way for a select group of producers looking to create Nicki Minaj-type beats with dope rappers in mind." Writing for The New York Times, Roxane Gay said that Minaj "broadened the definition of hip-hop, making it more joyful, energetic and robust". In their 20th anniversary cover story, XXL stated: "the lyrical giant has become one of the key figures in recent years to help bring the culture to new heights. [Minaj's] work has been outstanding, her contributions countless and the pinkprint she is leaving behind as she goes will be a new guide for many artists to follow."

The Independent described Minaj's rise to superstardom as "almost without precedent". Billboard credited Minaj for bringing female rap back to the mainstream in the US, and ranked her as the top female rapper on its decade-end chart of the most successful artists of the 2010s. With over 300 features, the magazine called Minaj a "rap and pop icon", adding that "she's been one of popular music's most reliable guest performers, notching dozens of chart hits as a supporting presence on other artists' singles". Complex said Minaj was able "take a simple song and turn it into a smash hit just because she's featured on it". She "made almost a second career" out of her features, and is the female artist in hip hop who has done the most collaborations with lesser-known artists, Forbes stated. While "opting to spend the time and energy to help many acts secure their big break", Minaj also "cemented her status as a superstar—one who can succeed with any type of track." Minaj became the most successful woman in hip hop history. Michael Saponara of Billboard wrote that she "reaffirmed living legend status" by "hitting the road for the Pink Friday 2 World Tour"—which concluded as the highest-grossing tour by a female rapper and one of the top five highest-grossing hip hop tours in history—and proved herself as rap's "centrifugal female force". With the tour, Minaj "etched her name in the annals of music history", The Source noted, while she "leaves behind a legacy of groundbreaking achievements and artistry".

Minaj fought for streaming to count toward artists' sales and certifications, and is credited with influencing this change in the industry. She has influenced or inspired many artists, including Tinashe, Cher Lloyd, Cupcakke, Billie Eilish, Lil Nas X, Ms Banks, Asian Doll, Doja Cat, Megan Thee Stallion, Latto, Shenseea, BIA, Lakeyah, Luísa Sonza, Coi Leray, Maliibu Miitch, City Girls, Baby Tate, Ice Spice, Rico Nasty, Flo Milli, Ivorian Doll, Angel Haze, Rubi Rose, Saweetie, and Doechii.

Minaj's critically acclaimed verse on Kanye West's "Monster" helped establish her as a "top tier talent who dispelled gender distinctions in rap", and was "the first time the conversation was ever about a female out-classing her male contemporaries", Pitchfork stated. The Los Angeles Times named her verse one of the 50 greatest moments in hip hop history, writing: "Minaj was already a multiplatinum headliner by the time she laid down her song-stealing verse on Kanye West's all-star romp "Monster" ... as much a defiant declaration of women's empowerment as a gloriously unhinged lyrical flex, [Minaj's performance] ranks as one of the most memorable mic drops in rap history." West said that at one point he considered removing her verse from the track, because he was worried it would outshine his own work: "I knew people would say that was the best verse on the best Hip Hop album of all time or arguably top ten albums of all time. ... and people to this day would say to me 'My favorite thing was Nicki Minaj's verse'."

Minaj has been praised by other hip hop artists over the years. Rick Ross said he was impressed seeing Minaj write her verse on "Monster" and deliver her performance, deeming it the moment he knew she was "one of the greatest". Cyhi the Prynce said he "couldn't believe she could rap that good as a young lady" and "knew she was special". Kanye West considered Minaj "the scariest artist in the game right now". "She has the most potential out of everyone to be the number-two rapper of all time, cause nobody's gonna be bigger than Eminem". 50 Cent called Minaj an "alpha female", adding that "[she] happens to be a girl, but that n***a is tough". RZA complimented her "versatility of lyricism and approach". Ice-T said that Minaj "does her thing. She has her own way of doing it. She has an ill vocal delivery. She kind of reminds me of a female Busta Rhymes, like how she throws her voice in different directions." Chance the Rapper highlighted Minaj's work "beyond hip hop ... streaming rights, like the rights of us like to let us connect the money were owed, the rights of Billboard to start accounting streams that they weren't counting - that was Nicki Minaj. So I respect Nicki in a whole different way."

== Achievements ==
Minaj is the recipient of numerous accolades, including nine American Music Awards, a Brit Award, eleven BET Awards, five Billboard Music Awards, eight MTV Video Music Awards, twelve MTV Europe Music Awards, six People's Choice Awards, and a Soul Train Music Award. She has received a total of 12 Grammy Award nominations, including for Best New Artist, Best Rap Album, and Best Rap Performance. She has won the MTV Video Music Award for Best Hip-Hop Video five times ("Super Bass", "Anaconda", "Chun-Li", "Do We Have a Problem?" and "Super Freaky Girl") and won a Best Female Video Award ("Starships"). Minaj is the only rapper to win the BET Award for Best Female Hip Hop Artist eight times. In 2012, Forbes included Minaj in its 30 Under 30 listicle of music. She was featured in the magazine's Celebrity 100 listicle in 2015 and 2016. In 2016, Time named Minaj one of the most influential people in the world in its annual Time 100, and featured her on one of the physical covers of the issue. In 2019, Billboard Women in Music awarded her with the Game Changer Award. At the 2023 MTV Europe Music Awards, Minaj became the first black artist and the first female rapper to win the MTV Europe Music Award for Best US Act. In 2025, Billboard ranked her at number 16 on its "Top 100 Women Artists of the 21st Century" list.

As of 2024, Minaj has sold over 100 million records worldwide, making her the best-selling female rapper and one of the best-selling music artists. Minaj achieved the largest album sales week of the 21st century among female rappers with her debut studio album Pink Friday, and second-largest of all time after Lauryn Hill's The Miseducation of Lauryn Hill (1998). In 2010, she became the first female solo artist to have seven songs on the Billboard Hot 100 simultaneously. In 2017, Minaj broke the record for the most Hot 100 entries by a female artist (until December 2020), surpassing Aretha Franklin, and in 2018, she became the first woman to accumulate 100 entries on the Hot 100. Her 2019 collaboration with Karol G, "Tusa", was the first song by two lead female artists to debut atop the Billboard Hot Latin Songs chart. In 2022, with the number-one Hot 100 debut of "Super Freaky Girl", she became the first solo female rapper to debut atop the chart since Hill in 1998. Minaj has the most number-ones, top-tens, and appearances on Hot R&B/Hip-Hop Songs (8, 47, and 145) among female artists. She has 23 top-ten singles on the Billboard Hot 100, the most for any female rapper. She is the female rapper with the most Hot 100 entries, top 40 entries, and Digital Songs chart-toppers. In 2023, she became the first female rapper to earn three number-one albums on the Billboard 200. Her fifth studio album Pink Friday 2 earned the highest first-week vinyl sales for a female rap album in US history. Her Pink Friday 2 World Tour (2024) grossed over US$108 million, becoming the fourth-highest-grossing tour by a rapper or hip hop artist in history, the highest-grossing tour by a female rapper, and the first among female rappers to surpass US$100 million in revenue. It also made Minaj the fifth Black female artist in history to surpass the mark from a single tour. In December 2025, RapTV ranked it as the sixth-highest-grossing tour by a rap or hip–hop artist. In January 2016, Minaj had her 26th number 1 on the Billboard Rap Digital Song Sales chart with "My Life" from Pink Friday 2, breaking Drake's record.

Minaj is the first woman to have appeared on the Forbes "Hip Hop Cash Kings" list since its inception in 2007, having made four consecutive appearances between 2011 and 2014. In 2010, she became the first woman to appear on MTV's Annual Hottest MC List since its inception in 2007. The following year, she was ranked sixth on the Rolling Stone master ranking of the "Kings of Hip Hop", which is based on record sales and social media metrics. In 2019, she became the first female rapper to achieve 100 million certified units by the Recording Industry Association of America (RIAA), across her albums and songs. In the U.S., she has 11 million certified album units and 54.5 million certified digital singles as a lead artist. All of Minaj's studio albums have been certified platinum or higher by the RIAA, making her the female rapper with the second-most platinum albums in the US (five), behind Missy Elliott, with six. Her highest-certified album by the RIAA is Pink Friday: Roman Reloaded, at quadruple platinum. Three of her songs have been certified diamond or higher by the RIAA: "Super Bass" (twelve-times platinum), "Bang Bang" (with Jessie J and Ariana Grande), and "Starships". "Starships" made Minaj the first female rapper with multiple solo diamond-certified songs (two), and tied her with Cardi B for the most RIAA diamond-certified tracks among female rappers (three).

In 2021, the music video for "Anaconda" became the first female rap solo song to surpass one billion views on YouTube. In total, Minaj has nine music videos with over one billion views across all credits on YouTube, and is the first female rapper to have two solo music videos with over 1 billion views on the platform. Two of those nine music videos have surpassed two billion views: "Bang Bang" (with Jessie J and Ariana Grande) and "Side to Side" (with Grande). Minaj was the fifth-most-streamed woman and most-streamed female rapper of the 2010s decade on Apple Music. Minaj is the most-followed female rapper on Spotify, with over 34.1 million followers. In 2022, Minaj became the first rapper to reach 200 million followers on Instagram, and in 2024 was the most-followed rapper with over 227 million followers. She deactivated her Instagram account in October 2025.

== Other activities ==
In March 2023, Minaj announced in an episode of her radio show, Queen Radio, that she was starting a record label imprint called Heavy On It Records, under Republic Records.

=== Endorsements ===
In November 2010, Minaj collaborated with MAC Cosmetics and launched the lipstick "Pink 4 Friday", sold to promote her debut studio album Pink Friday. In 2011, Mattel crafted a Barbie doll inspired by the rapper's likeness for charity, which she described as a "major moment" in her career. It was auctioned on the Charitybuzz website, with proceeds benefiting nonprofit Project Angel Food. Between 2012 and 2013, Minaj launched her own range of lip products for MAC Cosmetics' Viva Glam. In 2012, she appeared in advertisements for Pepsi's "LiveForNow" campaign, and signed an endorsement deal with Adidas for the brand's fall and winter campaigns later that year.

In April 2013, Minaj partnered with Beats Electronics to introduce her "Pink Pill" speakers. From 2013 to 2015, she released seasonal clothing collections for Kmart. In March 2015, Minaj was announced as a co-owner of the music streaming service Tidal alongside Jay-Z and other artists. In December 2016, Minaj and Glu Mobile released Nicki Minaj: The Empire, a role-playing mobile game for iOS and Android. In 2017, Minaj released two lipsticks in collaboration with MAC Cosmetics and starred in H&M's holiday campaign. The following year, she appeared in campaigns for Mercedes-Benz, EA Sports' Madden NFL 19, and Diesel.

In 2019, Minaj announced a collaboration with luxury fashion house Fendi. A capsule collection titled "Fendi Prints On", named after a lyric from her 2018 single 'Chun-Li', was released in October. In March 2022, Minaj fronted Marc Jacobs' "Heaven" spring collection. In May, she was named the new creative director of American men's magazine Maxim and became the global ambassador for its sports betting brand, MaximBet. In July, Minaj collaborated with Rap Snacks and released her own potato chip flavor, "Barbie-Que Honey Truffle". The following month, Mattel sued Rap Snacks, claiming the company violated the Barbie trademark and had made a "deliberate and calculated" choice to do so. The lawsuit was settled in September after the company changed the snack's name to "Bar-B-Quin".

In July 2023, a playable character model of Minaj was released as downloadable content for Call of Duty: Modern Warfare II, marking the first female "operator" of the game. In December 2023, she and Roblox introduced the virtual world Gag City on the game platform to promote her fifth album, Pink Friday 2 (2023). Minaj had previously coined the term for her album era, after which her fanbase circulated AI-generated content of the fan-made cityscape Gag City, a pink futuristic metropolis inspired by the cover artwork of the album.

=== Products ===
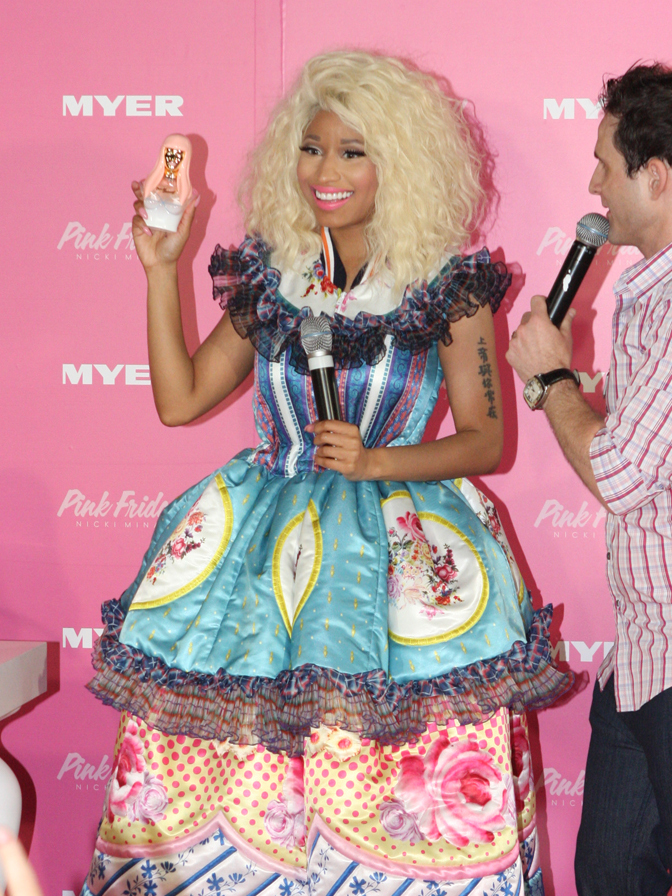
Minaj promoting her first fragrance "Pink Friday" in 2012

Minaj launched her fragrance line in September 2012 with "Pink Friday", which received three FiFi Award nominations. She has since released ten fragrances, with many named after her album releases.

In March 2024, Minaj launched her vegan press-on nails line, Pink Friday Nails, direct-to-consumer via its webstore. Pop-up stations dedicated to the range appeared on the Pink Friday 2 World Tour. In April, she and British apparel brand Loci released a sneaker collection. Minaj is an investor and co-owner of the brand, whose footwear is handmade using vegan materials.

== Public image ==
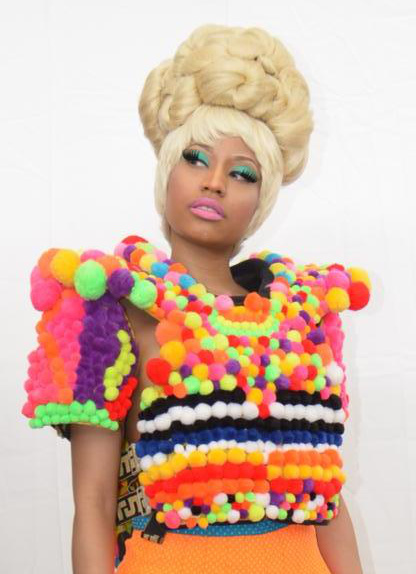
Early in her career, Minaj often wore colorful costumes, cosmetics, and wigs.

Billboard listed Minaj as the fourth-most-active musician on social media on its March 2011 Social 50 chart. Minaj has been called as a "fashion icon" by several publications, and was called a "camp style icon" by Refinery29. BET named Minaj a "gay icon". In 2011, Minaj cited Alexander McQueen, Gianni Versace, and Christian Louboutin as her favorite designers. The Huffington Post described her style as "risk-taking" and "far-out", with "bold sartorial choices". In 2014, Minaj reinvented her image, sporting a "natural" and "softer" look, wearing fewer wigs and less colourful costumes. She stated that she "went so far to the other side that there's only one place to go from there. You can either continue doing costumes or you can just say, "Hey guess what? This will shock them even more. Doing nothing will shock them even more"".

In 2010, Minaj said that although she originally felt obligated to mimic the provocative behavior of the "female rappers of [her] day", she intended to subdue her sexuality because she "[wants] people—especially young girls—to know that in life, nothing is going to be based on sex appeal. You've got to have something else to go with that." Her physique, notably her buttocks, attracted attention from the media. The cover art and music video for her 2014 single, "Anaconda", attracted significant media attention upon release. The Guardian wrote that she "doesn't shy from ruffling her audience's feathers", and others praised Minaj for "owning her sexuality", examining her work through a feminist perspective.

Minaj spoke about feminism in an interview with Vogue in 2015, saying "There are things that I do that feminists don't like, and there are things that I do that they do like. I don't label myself. I just say the truth about what I feel. I feel like women can do anything that they put their minds to." Her outspoken views have received significant media attention. In a 2018 interview, she discussed sex workers, her own sex appeal, and sexuality in music and on social media, which attracted criticism. Vanessa Grigoriadis of The New York Times Magazine wrote that Minaj "has become expert at modelling the ways that women can wield power in the industry. But she has also drawn attention to the ways in which power can be embodied by a woman standing up for herself and speaking her own mind." Minaj has also been involved in a widely publicized feud with rapper Cardi B since around 2017.

== Personal life ==
In a 2014 interview, Minaj stated that she had an abortion as a teenager, which she referenced in her songs "Autobiography" and "All Things Go". She said that it was the hardest thing she had gone through, and although it "haunted" her, she stands by her decision as she "didn't have anything to offer a child" and is pro-choice.

Minaj dated her hype man Safaree Samuels from 2003 to 2014. She dated rapper Meek Mill from 2015 until January 2017. In December 2018, Minaj began dating a childhood friend, Kenneth Petty. She announced their marriage in October 2019, hyphenating his last name to hers. In July 2020, she announced that she was expecting her first child. She gave birth to a son on September 30, 2020, whom she refers to publicly as Papa Bear.

In 2011, her cousin Nicholas Telemaque was murdered near his home in Brooklyn, an incident she referenced in "All Things Go" and "Champion". Her father, Robert Maraj, was killed in a 2021 hit-and-run accident in Long Island. Charles Polevich, who was 70 at the time of the crash, pleaded guilty to leaving the scene of incident involving death of a person and tampering with physical evidence. He was fined and sentenced to a year in prison.

In September 2021, Minaj responded to a fan's question about her lack of appearances at public events, stating that she did not want to put her infant at risk due to the COVID-19 pandemic, and that she had tested positive for the virus and had to quarantine from her son. She said she was getting the COVID-19 vaccine after she felt she had done enough research, and she would be vaccinated before she went on tour. She had also tweeted that her cousin in Trinidad told her that his friend suffered swollen testicles and became impotent after taking the vaccine, a claim that received backlash and was denied by Trinidad and Tobago health minister Terrence Deyalsingh, who stated that there was no evidence of that. In May 2022, Olivia Truffaut-Wong of The Cut stated that Minaj had likely gotten vaccinated as the 2022 Met Gala (which Minaj attended) required proof of vaccination and a negative COVID-19 PCR test to attend.

Minaj identifies as a Christian. In a 2022 post on Twitter, Minaj said she has ADHD; in March 2026 she posted about being neurodivergent. A long-time legal permanent resident of the U.S., she said in 2024 that she does not have U.S. citizenship. In January 2026, Minaj stated she was finalizing her citizenship paperwork following a joint public appearance with President Donald Trump.

== Legal issues ==
Minaj's husband Kenneth Petty was convicted of attempted rape at age 16 in 1995, serving four years in prison and registering as a sex offender upon release. When Minaj and her husband moved to California, he failed to update his residence on the sex offender registration and was indicted in February 2020; he registered in the state's database by the following month. In August 2021, Jennifer Hough, the woman who accused Petty when they were both 16, filed a lawsuit against the couple alleging harassment, intimidation, and infliction of emotional distress, and requested a $20 million default judgement when Minaj did not respond to the lawsuit in time; the court declined it, declaring that Minaj was not in default. Minaj filed a response, calling the allegations "blatant falsehoods" and including evidence of discrepancies in Hough's story. Minaj stated that she "never asked [Hough] to change her story", "never offered her any money in return for a statement", and "did not threaten her with any type of harm". She stated that, after her husband's indictment, Hough contacted her via a mutual acquaintance, and in their phone call, indirectly asked Minaj for a payoff, "mistakenly believ[ing] that I would pay her money to take back her accusation against my husband". Minaj said she responded by telling Hough that "the indictment was my husband's problem, not mine, and that he would have to live with the consequences of having chosen years ago to plead guilty to a crime which he did not commit", and that Hough said "I'm not saying it didn't happen, but maybe it was just a misunderstanding". Hough voluntarily dismissed the case against Minaj.

On May 25, 2024, Minaj was detained when marijuana was found in her luggage at Schiphol Airport in Amsterdam, Netherlands, where she was boarding a plane to perform a concert in Manchester, England. She was fined and released the same day.

In January 2025, a lawsuit was filed against Minaj by Brandon Garrett, a former tour employee, alleging assault, battery, and "intentional infliction of emotional distress." He claimed that in April 2024, while he was working as a day-to-day manager on her Pink Friday 2 tour, Minaj struck him multiple times after he had another employee collect her prescription in his place. He alleged that Minaj's former manager, Debra Antney, then informed him that he would not be joining the tour group for their next tour date. Minaj's lawyer, Judd Burstein, denied his allegations, calling them false and frivolous, and expressed confidence that the matter would be resolved in her favor.

== Philanthropy and advocacy ==
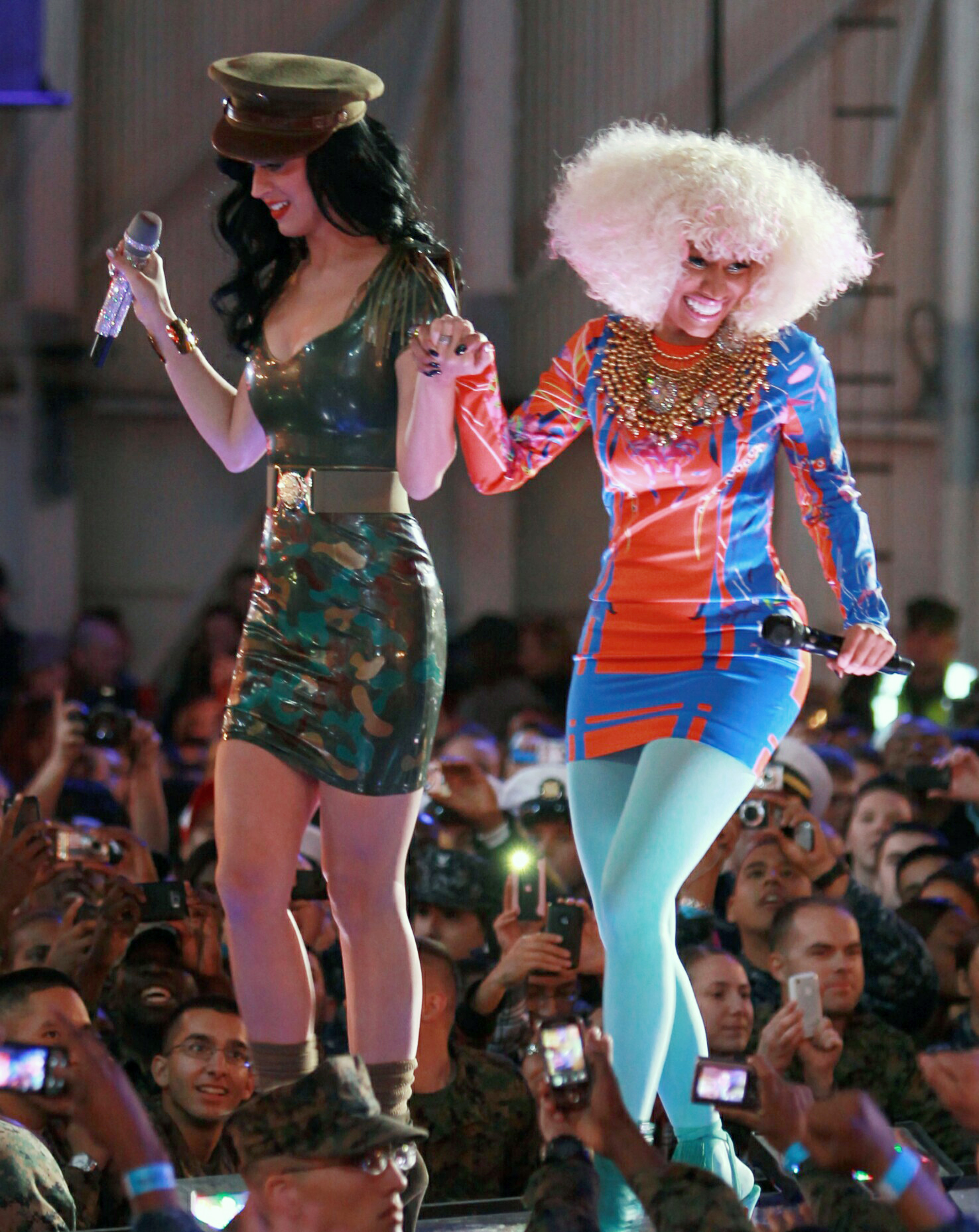
Katy Perry (left) and Minaj perform for service members at the 2010 VH1 Divas Salute the Troops concert.

Minaj has advocated for victims of natural disasters and HIV/AIDS, service members, women's rights, education, and religious freedom, and donated to various causes and fans. She performed alongside Katy Perry at the 2010 VH1 Divas Salute the Troops concert, and had a Barbie doll created in her likeness to raise funds for Project Angel Food in 2011, a charity that provides food to victims of HIV/AIDS. In the aftermath of Hurricane Sandy in 2012, Minaj donated $15,000 to the Food Bank For New York City and held a turkey drive at her alma mater, PS 45. In 2017, she revealed she had been donating money to a village in India for a few years via her pastor, Lydia Sloley, which helped the village open a computer center, a tailoring institute, a reading program, and two water wells. Minaj donated $25,000 to the Red Cross to support humanitarian aid efforts following Hurricane Harvey in August 2017. She also paid the college tuition, student loans, and other education expenses of multiple fans on Twitter. She then posted that she would launch an official charity for student loans and tuition relief, which was titled Student of the Game in 2018.

In a 2018 episode of The Ellen DeGeneres Show, Minaj gave out over $150,000 in donations to her fans. In 2019, she pulled out of headlining a concert in Saudi Arabia following online backlash from activists, after women's rights activist Loujain al-Hathloul was detained and arrested for speaking out against the Saudi regime. Minaj was praised by Thor Halvorssen of The Human Rights Foundation, who criticized her initial plan to perform in a letter. Minaj stated, "While I want nothing more than to bring my show to fans in Saudi Arabia, after better educating myself on the issues, I believe it is important for me to make clear my support for the rights of women, the LGBTQ community and freedom of expression."

In 2020, Minaj donated $25,000 to the St. Jude's Home for Girls school after visiting the school in Trinidad. In a speech, she encouraged the girls to push through hard obstacles, and referenced her own experience with domestic violence. Following the release of the song "Trollz" (2020) with 6ix9ine, Minaj announced that a portion of its proceeds, along with profits from all merchandise, will go towards the Bail Project amid the Black Lives Matter protests sparked by the murder of George Floyd. Minaj was one of over 200 artists who signed an open letter in April 2024 demanding for safety from the "predatory use of AI" in the music industry. In November 2025, Minaj sent a team to Jamaica to deliver relief supplies to people affected by Hurricane Melissa. In 2026, Minaj pledged to donate to the Trump Accounts, an investment program created to aid the financial future of American children, providing parents a starter fund for their children in a tax-deferred investment account. She said that the program encourages financial literacy and "will benefit everyone, decreasing the gap for future prosperity between children who traditionally aren't born with a full bank account and children who are. I believe it will have the most profound impact on urban communities, which often face greater financial challenges."

== Political views ==
Minaj has advocated for religious freedom and against political persecution. In 2015, she commented on the Charleston church shooting, in which multiple people were murdered in a church. In 2018, Minaj spoke out against the separation of families at the border in the U.S., posting: "I can't imagine the horror of being in a strange place & having my parents stripped away from me at the age of 5. ... Please stop this. Can you try to imagine the terror & panic these kids feel right now? Not knowing if their parents are dead or alive". In 2020, she supported End SARS, a series of protests against police brutality in Nigeria, stating: "Standing with & praying for the brave young people of Nigeria who are on the front lines of this senseless violence. Your voice is being heard."

In a 2023 interview, Minaj said, "I'm one of those people who doesn't go with a crowd. I like to make my own assessment of everything without help from everyone." She rejected being told who she should campaign for, stating: "there's a lot we don't know that's going on in the government, and I don't think it changes whether you lean to the left or right."

In November 2025, Minaj denounced violence against Christians in Nigeria in a social media post: "No group should ever be persecuted for practicing their religion ... We don't have to share the same beliefs in order for us to respect each other." She later delivered a speech at the United Nations advocating for an end to the religious violence, stating: "Sadly, this problem is not only a growing problem in Nigeria, but also in so many other countries around the world ... religious freedom means we all sing our faith regardless of who we are, where we live and what we believe." Her remarks gained media attention, particularly for her support of sitting U.S. president Donald Trump's stance on the issue.

In December 2025, Minaj criticized California governor Gavin Newsom's statement that he wants "to see trans kids", commenting: "Imagine being the guy running on wanting to see trans kids.... Not even a trans ADULT would run on that. Normal adults wake up & think they want to see healthy, safe, happy kids."

Minaj being interviewed by Erika Kirk at Turning Point USA 2025

She was later interviewed by Erika Kirk at a Turning Point USA conference, where she commented on various topics, including her journey as a Christian and the reasons she chose to speak out on these issues. Minaj said that those who are intolerant of people worshiping God should not be in power. On why her decision was seen as controversial, she stated:

We're not allowed to have a different opinion, we're not allowed to think out loud ... And especially for the young people, I don't want them growing up in a world where they feel like that. They deserve for their voices to be heard, they have valid feelings, and they're thinking about things, and it deserves attention.

On why she spoke up, Minaj stated that she "got tired of being pushed around ... then you realize 'I have something inside of me that's stronger than what's out there'", adding, "In a world that doesn't want us to think, we will think. By ourselves, on our own." Subsequent to these events, media outlets characterized Minaj's views as having become more conservative, contrasting them with her previous criticism of the anti-immigration policies enacted during the first presidency of Donald Trump.

Minaj endorsed Republican candidates in the 2026 United States midterm elections.

== Discography ==
- Pink Friday (2010)
- Pink Friday: Roman Reloaded (2012)
- The Pinkprint (2014)
- Queen (2018)
- Pink Friday 2 (2023)

== Filmography ==
- Ice Age: Continental Drift (2012)
- The Other Woman (2014)
- Barbershop: The Next Cut (2016)
- The Angry Birds Movie 2 (2019)

== Tours ==
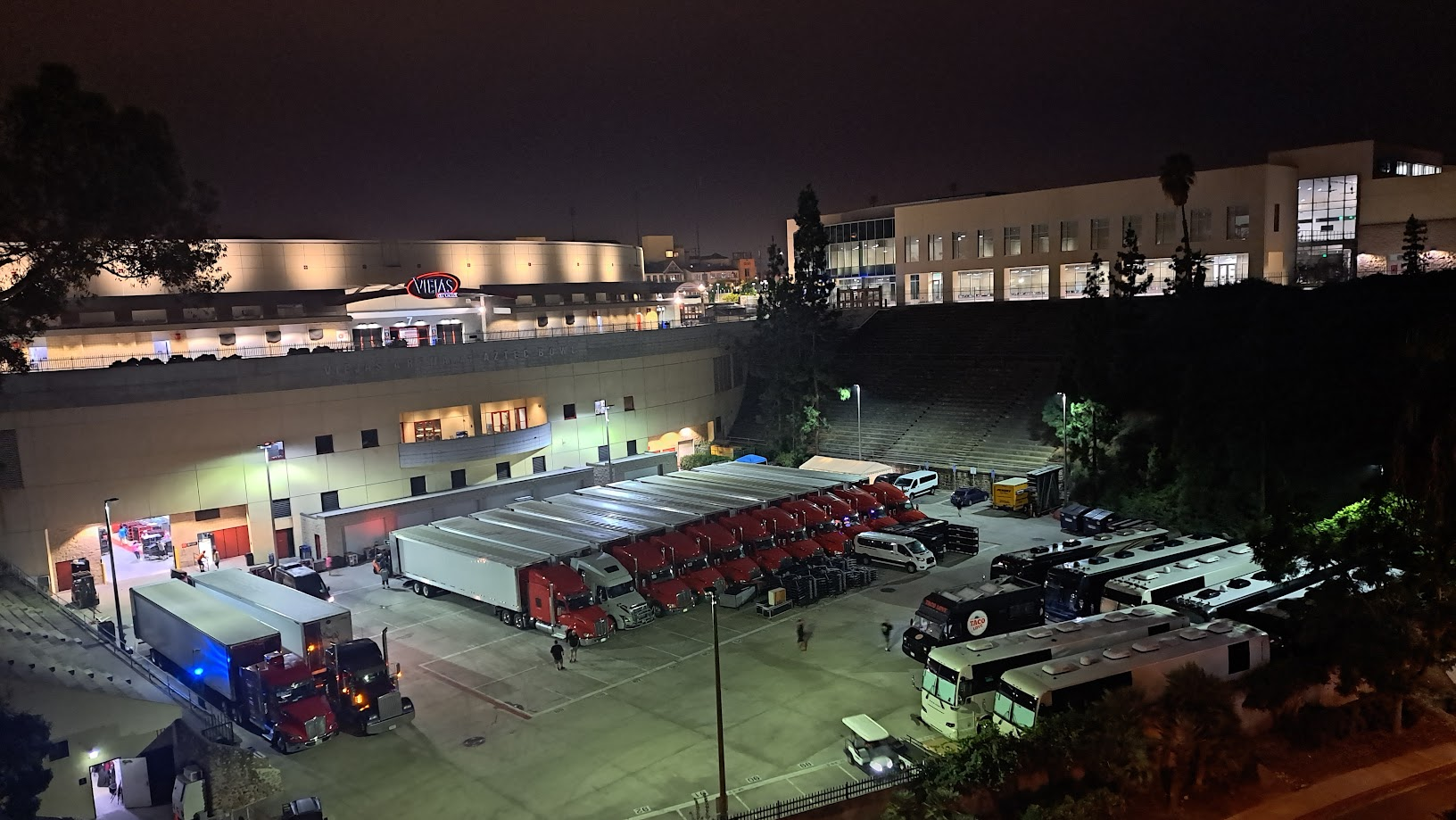
Minaj's tour buses and trucks parked at Viejas Arena in San Diego, in September 2024

Headlining

- Pink Friday Tour (2011–2012)
- Pink Friday: Reloaded Tour (2012)
- The Pinkprint Tour (2015–2016)
- Pink Friday 2 World Tour (2024)

Co-headlining

- The Nicki Wrld Tour (with Juice Wrld) (2019)

Opening act

- Lil Wayne – America's Most Wanted Tour (2008)
- Lil Wayne – I Am Music II Tour (2011)
- Britney Spears – Femme Fatale Tour (2011)

== See also ==
- East Coast hip-hop
- List of most-followed Instagram accounts
- List of Trinidadians and Tobagonians

| Preceded by Cee-Lo Green | Saturday Night Live musical guest January 29, 2011 | Succeeded by Linkin Park |
| Preceded by Mark Ronson and Bruno Mars | Saturday Night Live musical guest December 6, 2014 | Succeeded by Charli XCX |
