= Chun-Li (song) =

2018 single by Nicki Minaj

Single by Nicki Minaj

from the album Queen
- Released: April 12, 2018
- Recorded: April 2018
- Studio: Glenwood Place Studios (Burbank, California); Chris Athen Masters (Austin, Texas)
- Genre: Hip hop
- Length: 3:11
- Label: Young Money; Cash Money
- Songwriters: Onika Maraj; Jeremy Reid
- Producers: Jeremy Reid; Nicki Minaj

Nicki Minaj singles chronology
"Barbie Tingz" (2018)	"Chun-Li" (2018)	"Anybody" (2018)

Music video
- "Chun-Li" on YouTube

"Chun-Li" is a song by rapper Nicki Minaj from her fourth studio album, Queen (2018). It was released on April 12, 2018, by Young Money Entertainment and Cash Money Records as the lead single from the album. It was solely written by Minaj and produced by Jeremy Reid. Reid's name was added to the writing credits for adlibs and production. The song peaked at number 10 on the US Billboard Hot 100, reached the top 20 in Canada, and the top 30 in the United Kingdom. It won the award for Best Hip-Hop Video at the 2018 MTV Video Music Awards.

== Background and release ==
In March 2017, Minaj released a three-single pack that included "Changed It" with Lil Wayne, "No Frauds" with Drake and Wayne, and "Regret in Your Tears", intended as lead singles for Queen but eventually did not make the final cut. On April 10, 2018, Minaj announced on Instagram that she would be releasing two new songs: "Barbie Tingz" and "Chun-Li" on April 12, and also posted cover artworks of the respective singles. "Chun-Li", which takes its name from the Street Fighter character of the same name, was released alongside the buzz single "Barbie Tingz" as a part of Minaj's upcoming fourth studio album Queen (2018) and made available for streaming and digital download on April 12 by Young Money Entertainment and Cash Money Records. The release of songs landed on the 10th anniversary of Minaj's second mixtape, Sucka Free (2008). On May 30, Minaj posted a video showing the making of the song, in preview of her upcoming documentary about the making of Queen set to air on HBO Max in 2021.

== Production ==
Chun-Li (2018)
A sample of the song, where the second interlude and the chorus can be heard.

"Chun-Li" was produced by Atlanta-based record producer J. Reid for Chevi Muzic, alongside Minaj who was credited as a coproducer. According to him, Minaj wanted to deliver the type of "boom-bap" flavored beats that were reminiscent of the New York City hip hop scene during the 1980s and 1990s. The structural composition of the song primarily revolves around the intricate technique of slapping, various percussive instruments, and a minimalist arrangement of soundbeads that are also multilayered with an extensive orchestration of recurrent keyboard synths. Minaj linked with Reid in late December 2017, and later explained to him what kind of beat she wanted for the song. She then proceeded towards rapping it and give him the vibe. Reid made about 13 different beats, and Minaj picked out the one that she wanted. The song was done in early April 2018, including writing, production, mixing, and mastering.

Lyrically, Minaj "rails" (criticizes) her online detractors and alludes to the negative circulation and press surrounding the track. "They need rappers like me! So they can get on their fucking keyboards and make me the bad guy, Chun-Li," she declares in the second interlude.

== Music videos ==
A vertical music video for the song was released on April 13, 2018, via Minaj's YouTube channel. It is a video montage of videos filmed by Minaj while holding her phone vertically. In the visual, Minaj recites the lyrics of the song while posing on a couch, but relinquishes control of her phone for a couple of runway-like shots.

On April 27, Minaj released a teaser to promote the official music video. However, she confirmed on her Instagram that the teaser was not related in any way to the music video and is rather a video of her and Aliya Janell, the choreographer of the official video, doing a freestyle dance to the song.

The full accompanying video of the song was released on May 4, with the subtitle 春麗, which translates to Chun-Li. Directed by Steven Klein through Good Company Pictures, it features what Klein deemed East Asian-esque futuristic/superhero-inspired outfits. The video won the Best Hip-Hop Video at the 2018 MTV Video Music Awards, and was nominated for Best Hip-Hop at the MTV Europe Music Awards and has over 160 million views on YouTube. Despite this, the video was accused of perpetuating East Asian stereotypes and appropriating East Asian culture by prominent media outlets such as Cosmopolitan and Teen Vogue.

== Critical reception ==
Bianca Gracie of Billboard said "Minaj sounds cocky in the best way […] she resurrects her Nicki the Ninja alter-ego by assassinating the horn-driven beat with her lyrical wordplay, switching accents with ease." Jon Caramanica of The New York Times said, "these are sparring records–loose, pugnacious, a little uncentered […] 'Chun-Li' swaggers with the authority of the mid-90s. As is the norm, Ms. Minaj aims shots at unnamed antagonists, but in the past, that bluster felt truly targetless. But now, for the first time since the beginning of her career, there's someone who might plausibly shoot back, and win." John Kennedy from XXL said the song is "open enough for Nicki [Minaj] to get her bars off à la her mixtape days." Maeve McDermott of USA Today said, "Chun-Li sees Nicki out for blood, with the track named after a Street Fighter character who seeks revenge after her father's murder."

== Commercial performance ==
"Chun-Li" debuted at number 92 on the US Billboard Hot 100 after a day of tracking, with 20,000 downloads sold and 3.5 million streams, and four days of radio airplay. It ascended to number 10 the following week, selling 38,000 copies and earning 22.1 million streams. The song became Minaj's sixth top 10 entry as a lead artist–and her first solo single to enter that region since "Anaconda" in 2014–and 16th overall, extending her record for most top 10 singles among female rappers. "Chun-Li" also logged the greatest jump on the Hot 100, 82 positions, since Katy Perry's "Roar" (2013) jumped 83 spots following a full tracking week. It fell 38 positions to number 48 in its third week. On its fifth week, the song re-entered the top 20 of the chart jumping to number 19. It was certified platinum by the Recording Industry Association of America (RIAA) on July 30, 2018, for 1 million equivalent units moved.

Outside the United States, "Chun-Li" reached the top 20 in Canada, the top 30 in Scotland, France and the United Kingdom, and the top 60 in Australia, earning a double platinum certification in the latter.

== Live performances ==
Minaj first performed "Chun-Li" live during Future’s set at Rolling Loud Festival in Miami on May 13, 2018. She also performed the song during her Saturday Night Live season finale appearance on May 19. She performed a medley of "Chun-Li" and "Rich Sex" on the BET Awards 2018 held on June 23.

== Other versions ==
American rappers Juelz Santana, BlocBoy JB, and Baby Soulja recorded their own freestyles over the song's beat.

== Credits and personnel ==
Credits and personnel adapted from Queen album liner notes.

Recording

- Recorded at Glenwood Place Studios, Burbank, California
- Mastered at Chris Athen Masters, Austin, Texas

Personnel

- Nicki Minaj – vocals, co-production
- J. Reid – production
- Aubry "Big Juice" Delaine – record engineering
- Laura Bates – record engineering assistance
- Lucas Lyle – record engineering assistance
- Iván Jiménez – record engineering assistance

== Charts ==
=== Weekly charts ===
Weekly chart performance for "Chun-Li"
Chart (2018)	Peak position
Australia (ARIA)	54
Canada Hot 100 (Billboard)	18
Ireland (IRMA)	65
Portugal (AFP)	100
Scottish Singles Sales (Official Charts)	23
Sweden Heatseeker (Sverigetopplistan)	9
Switzerland (Schweizer Hitparade)	99
UK Singles (Official Charts)	26
US Billboard Hot 100	10
US Hot R&B/Hip-Hop Songs (Billboard)	6
US Rhythmic Airplay (Billboard)	7

=== Year-end charts ===
2018 year-end chart performance for "Chun-Li"
Chart (2018)	Position
US Hot R&B/Hip-Hop Songs (Billboard)	49

== Certifications ==
Certifications for "Chun-Li"
Region	Certification	Certified units/sales
Australia (ARIA)	2× Platinum	140,000^{‡}
Brazil (Pro-Música Brasil)	Platinum	40,000^{‡}
Canada (Music Canada)	Gold	40,000^{‡}
New Zealand (RMNZ)	Platinum	30,000^{‡}
United Kingdom (BPI)	Gold	400,000^{‡}
United States (RIAA)	4× Platinum	4,000,000^{‡}
^{‡} Sales+streaming figures based on certification alone.

== Release history ==
Release dates for "Chun-Li"
Region	Date	Format	Label	Ref.
Various	April 12, 2018	Digital download; streaming	Young Money; Cash Money	
United States	April 2018	Rhythmic radio	Young Money; Cash Money	
