= Barbie Tingz =

2018 single by Nicki Minaj

Single by Nicki Minaj

from the album Queen (Target exclusive and Japanese editions)
- Released: April 12, 2018
- Genre: Hip hop
- Length: 3:11
- Label: Young Money; Cash Money
- Songwriters: Onika Maraj; Jeremy Reid
- Producer: Reid

Nicki Minaj singles chronology
"Plain Jane (Remix)" (2017)	"Barbie Tingz" (2018)	"Chun-Li" (2018)

Music video
- "Barbie Tingz" on YouTube

"Barbie Tingz" is a song recorded by rapper Nicki Minaj. It was released on April 12, 2018 by Young Money and Cash Money as a single alongside Chun-Li. It is solely written by Minaj and produced by Jeremy Reid, similarly to "Chun-Li". According to Minaj, Reid's name was added to the writing credits for adlibs and production. It was included as a bonus track on the Target and Japanese exclusive versions of Minaj's fourth studio album, Queen (2018).

== Release ==
On April 10, 2018, Minaj revealed the cover art for the song on social media, alongside "Chun-Li". The song was released on April 12, 2018, through Young Money Entertainment and Cash Money Records as a single.

== Music video ==
The official music video directed by Minaj and Giovanni Bianco of Serial Pictures was released on May 4, 2018. It features Minaj in various outfits and choreography. The video has 132 Million views on YouTube as of December 2025.

== Critical reception ==
Bianca Gracie in Billboard called it a "juicy braggadocious anthem laid atop a throwback production by Chevy Music that is pure New York City" and stated that it's reminiscent of the Litefeet dance era, "the bars are filled with Minaj's signature themes: boasting about her vagina, calling out jealous women and aiming shots at her rap enemies." Jon Caraminaca on The New York Times said, "these are sparring records—loose, pugnacious, a little uncentered. "Barbie Tingz" has the cold snap of early '80s hip-hop and electro ... As is the norm, Ms. Minaj aims shots at unnamed antagonists, but in the past, that bluster felt truly targetless. But now, for the first time since the beginning of her career, there's someone who might plausibly shoot back, and win." Maeve McDermott of USA Today said, "Barbie Tingz is the real highlight of the two tracks, a welcome reminder of Nicki's addictive flow over a beat that sounds made for summertime radio play."

== Commercial performance ==
"Barbie Tingz" debuted at number 83 on the U.S. Billboard Hot 100 after a day of tracking and four days of radio airplay, with 21,000 downloads sold and 4.2 million streams. It ascended to number 25 the following week, selling 29,000 copies and earning 18 million streams. It fell to number 78 in its third week. The song managed to peak at number one in New Zealand's Heatseekers chart.

== Credits and personnel ==
Credits adapted from Tidal.

- Chevy Music – production
- Laura Bates – mixing assistance, record engineering assistance
- Ivan Jimenez – record engineering assistance
- Aubry "Big Juice" Delaine – mixing, record engineering
- Labrinth – record engineering

== Charts ==
Weekly chart performance for "Barbie Tingz"
Chart (2018)	Peak position
Australia (ARIA)	41
Canada Hot 100 (Billboard)	21
Ireland (IRMA)	58
New Zealand Heatseekers (RMNZ)	1
Portugal (AFP)	81
Scotland Singles (OCC)	28
Sweden (Sverigetopplistan)	90
UK Singles (OCC)	31
US Billboard Hot 100	25
US Hot R&B/Hip-Hop Songs (Billboard)	17

== Certifications ==
Certifications for "Barbie Tingz"
Region	Certification	Certified units/sales
Australia (ARIA)	Platinum	70,000^{‡}
Brazil (Pro-Música Brasil)	Gold	20,000^{‡}
New Zealand (RMNZ)	Gold	15,000^{‡}
United Kingdom (BPI)	Silver	200,000^{‡}
United States (RIAA)	Gold	500,000^{‡}
^{‡} Sales+streaming figures based on certification alone.
