= Bussin (Nicki Minaj and Lil Baby song) =

2022 single by Nicki Minaj and Lil Baby

Single by Nicki Minaj and Lil Baby
- Released: February 11, 2022
- Recorded: 2021
- Genre: Trap
- Length: 2:16
- Label: Young Money; Republic
- Composers: Cyrick Palmer; Rahsul Barnes Greer; Terrell Greenlee
- Lyricists: Onika Maraj; Dominique Jones; Joshua Goods
- Producers: Swaggyono; DJ Tizz

Nicki Minaj singles chronology
"Do We Have a Problem?" (2022)	"Bussin" (2022)	"Blick Blick" (2022)

Lil Baby singles chronology
"Do We Have a Problem?" (2022)	"Bussin" (2022)	"In a Minute" (2022)

Audio video
- Nicki Minaj, Lil Baby - Bussin (Audio)" on YouTube

"Bussin" is a song by American rappers Nicki Minaj and Lil Baby. It was written by the artists, Tate Kobang, Finesse, and producers Swaggyono of Working on Dying and DJ Tizz. It is their second collaboration, being released on February 11, 2022, one week after their own "Do We Have a Problem?". It was included on Minaj's first greatest hits album Queen Radio: Volume 1 (2022).

== Background ==
On February 4, 2022, Minaj and Lil Baby released their first collaboration titled "Do We Have a Problem?". The music video of the song ends with a preview of "Bussin", which garnered positive reactions from fans. Minaj announced the song on her Twitter, saying "Next week we pushin B for Bussin btch WTF IS GOOD". The artwork was then revealed on February 7. The song is part of a weekly surprise treat for the fans, referred to by Minaj as "Pink Friday".

== Composition ==
The song sees Minaj and Baby trading verses over a "staccato, foreboding production", with the former "laying down a quick rap flow".

== Commercial performance ==
In the United States, "Bussin" debuted and peaked at number 20 on the Billboard Hot 100 for the week ending February 26, 2022. It additionally charted on the Digital Song Sales chart at number five.

== Charts ==
Chart performance for "Bussin"
Chart (2022)	Peak position
Canada Hot 100 (Billboard)	40
Global 200 (Billboard)	27
Greece International (IFPI)	96
Hungary (Single Top 40)	37
Ireland (IRMA)	89
New Zealand Hot Singles (RMNZ)	9
South Africa Streaming (TOSAC)	35
UK Singles (Official Charts)	70
US Billboard Hot 100	20
US Hot R&B/Hip-Hop Songs (Billboard)	5

== Release history ==
Release history for "Bussin"
Region	Date	Format	Label	Ref.
Various	February 11, 2022	Digital download; streaming	Republic	
