= Bashorun Gaa =

Studio album by 9ice
- Released: 7 December 2011
- Recorded: 2009–2011
- Genres: Afropop; fuji; hip-hop
- Length: 70:07
- Label: Alapomeji Ancestral
- Producers: Tee-Y Mix; Spellz; Sossick; Cheepho; Pastor Child; Puffy Tee

9ice chronology
Tradition (2009)	Bashorun Gaa (2011)	Versus (2011)

Singles from Bashorun Gaa
- 1. "Shakashiki" Released: 1 November 2010; 2. "Attitude" Released: 22 October 2011; 3. "Adigun Ojuwonlo" Released: 22 October 2011; 4. "Everyday" Released: 22 October 2011

Bashorun Gaa is the fourth studio album by Nigerian singer 9ice. It was released on 7 December 2011 by Alapomeji Ancestral Records in conjunction with Versus. The album features a sole guest appearance from Vector and production handled by Tee-Y Mix, Spellz, Sossick, Cheepho, Pastor Child, and Puffy Tee. Bashorun Gaa was supported by the singles "Shakashiki", "Adigun Ojuwonlo", "Attitude", and "Everyday". The album was named after Bashorun Gáà, a 17th-century war leader in the Oyo Empire. He said he chose the name because of Gáà's strength and values, focusing on qualities he believed should be remembered despite the figure's controversial legacy. Bashorun Gaa was postponed twice and earned praise for its lyricism, despite criticism of its length.

== Background and promotion ==
Bashorun Gaa was delayed three times; it was first meant to release in December 2010, but got pushed back. It got pushed back again to March of 2011, and didn't release. The release of the album was much anticipated due to a popularized beef 9ice had with Nigerian rapper Ruggedman. In an interview with Channels TV, 9ice said that the albums' dual release was inspired by how Fuji singers released multiple albums in a year. In a separate interview with Showtime Celebrity, he explained the album's delayed release was to allow his previous album, Tradition (2009), time to breathe and gain momentum.

9ice promoted Bashorun Gaa with an album launch concert on 11 March 2012 held at the Eko Hotel in Lagos. The concert featured a stage decorated with native and street themes. Guest performers included Tiwa Savage, P-Square, Wizkid, and members of the Coded Tunes collective, such as Lord of Ajasa, Jahbless, and Reminisce. Other appearances included Wande Coal, Don Jazzy, and Fuji musician Kwam 1. Abimbola Fashola, wife of the Lagos State governor was in attendance at the concert. The concert included performances of both new and previously released tracks.

=== Singles ===
Bashorun Gaa's lead single "Shakashiki" was released on 1 November 2010. On 22 October 2011, the singles "Attitude", "Adigun Ojuwonlo", and "Everyday" were released as the album's second, third, and fourth singles respectively. All singles were produced by Tee-Y Mix, and mixed/mastered by Zeeno Foster. The album's second single, "Attitude", is an up-tempo track promoting positive behavior and mindset, and received exclusive pre-release airplay on Wazobia FM. "Adigun Ojuwonlo" is a highlife-influenced track talking about self-appraisal and confidence. It received radio play on Rainbow FM 94.1, and had leaked prior to its official release. "Everyday" is a love-themed track reflecting on relationships, life goals, and settling down.

== Composition ==
Bashorun Gaa which runs 18 tracks long opens with "Pace Setter" featuring Vector, the album's only feature. On the track he declares rather confident lyrics: "I'm not insane. It's in your brain. I’m still the same", asserting his continued presence in the music industry after setbacks in his career. The album leans heavily on traditional Yoruba influences blended with modern production. "3310", "Simple Strategy", and "Don't Go" showcase 9ice's use of proverbs, cultural references, and indigenous instrumentation. "3310" likens the artist's resilience to the durability of the Nokia phone of the same name, while "Simple Strategy" draws sonic inspiration from famous influential figures such as Fela Kuti and Ayinde Barrister. On "Everyday", 9ice delivers a love song that features layered Yoruba lyrics and melodies that can convey emotion beyond language. "Shakashiki" is reminiscent of tracks from Gongo Aso (2008). Songs like "I Rule" and "Enife" give a bold tone, showing 9ice in a more confident and forceful mood.

== Critical reception ==
Professional ratings
Review scores
Source	Rating
Hip Hop World Magazine	4/5 stars
Jaguda	8/10
Nigerian Entertainment Today	3.5/5 stars

Writing for YNaija, Wilfred Okiche described Bashorun Gaa as a "strong cohesive unit" with "potential favourite[s]" across its tracks, praising its genre mix and 9ice's delivery. He criticized its length but concluded that 9ice was "coming into his own as a powerful prime minister, quiet but effective". Osarumwense of Hip Hop World Magazine said that Bashorun Gaa showed "growth and improvement in 9ice's music" despite limited commercial appeal, awarding the album a score of 4/5.

Ayomide Tayo of Nigerian Entertainment Today characterized the album as a "melodic renaissance" full of "strong and cohesive" songs. Despite it being "too long and ambitious", he gave it a rating of 3.5/5. Ayo Jaguda of Jaguda said Bashorun Gaa was "more well packaged than Tradition", and was a "very good album" that was "worth the wait". Although he noted that it was "not a perfect album", he concluded that it was "a good one" that helped 9ice "clear his name on the controversies", giving it an overall grade of 8/10.

== Track listing ==
Bashorun Gaa track listing
No.	Title	Writer(s)	Producer(s)	Length
1.	"Pace Setter" (featuring Vector)	Abolore Akande; Olanrewaju Ogunmefun	Tee-Y Mix	4:16
2.	"Everyday"	Akande	Tee-Y Mix	3:37
3.	"Mu Number"	Akande	Spellz	3:51
4.	"3310"	Akande	Tee-Y Mix	2:57
5.	"Ori Olowo"	Akande	Spellz	3:54
6.	"Attitude"	Akande	Tee-Y Mix	3:46
7.	"Simple Strategy"	Akande	Spellz	3:47
8.	"Adigun Ojuwonlo"	Akande	Tee-Y Mix	4:37
9.	"I Rule"	Akande	Sossick	3:21
10.	"Shakashiki"	Akande	Tee-Y Mix	3:56
11.	"Display"	Akande	Puffy Tee	3:27
12.	"Enife"	Akande	Sossick	4:12
13.	"Omo"	Akande	Cheepho	4:30
14.	"Takoto"	Akande	Pastor Child	3:35
15.	"We Are Ready"	Akande	Tee-Y Mix	3:34
16.	"So Fun Won"	Akande	Sossick	3:43
17.	"Don't Go"	Akande	Cheepho	4:46
18.	"Buje Budanu"	Akande	Cheepho	4:08
Total length:				70:07

== Personnel ==
- 9ice – vocals
- Vector – vocals
- Tee-Y Mix – production
- Spellz – production
- Sossick – production
- Cheepho – production
- Pastor Child – production
- Puffy Tee – production
- Zeeno Foster – mixing, mastering

== Release history ==
Release history and formats for Versus
Region	Date	Format	Label
Nigeria	7 December 2011	CD; digital download	Alapomeji Ancestral
