= List of awards and nominations received by Nicki Minaj =

Nicki Minaj awards and nominations
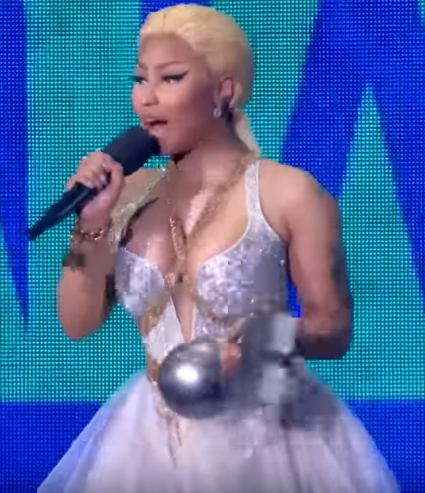
- Minaj with the MTV Europe Music Award for Best Hip Hop of 2018
Awards and nominations
Award	Wins	Nominations
American Music Awards	9	13
BET Awards	11	39
BET Hip Hop Awards	9	46
Billboard Music Awards	5	28
Billboard Women in Music	2	2
Brit Awards	1	2
Grammy Awards	0	12
Guinness World Records	3	3
MTV Video Music Awards	8	25
MTV Europe Music Awards	12	29
Nickelodeon Kids Choice Awards	2	6
Billboard Latin Music Awards	0	6
Latin American Music Awards	3	3
Latin Grammy Awards	0	2

Totals (Note: Certain award groups do not simply award one winner. They acknowledge several different recipients, have runners-up, and have third place. Since this is a specific recognition and is different from losing an award, runner-up mentions are considered wins in this award tally. For simplification and to avoid errors, each award in this list has been presumed to have had a prior nomination.)
- Wins: 217
- Nominations: 551

Nicki Minaj is a Trinidadian rapper based in the United States. After releasing three mixtapes between 2007 and 2009, Minaj signed a recording contract with Young Money Entertainment in 2009. Since then, she has released five studio albums and a compilation album. In 2011, Minaj won two American Music Awards–one for Favorite Rap/Hip-Hop Artist and the other for Favorite Rap/Hip-Hop Album, for her debut album Pink Friday. She went on to win in both categories again the following year, with the "Favorite Rap/Hip-Hop Album" award being for her second studio album Pink Friday: Roman Reloaded. In 2015, Minaj won in the same categories again, with the "Favorite Rap/Hip-Hop Album" award being for her third studio album The Pinkprint. In 2011, Minaj won her first MTV Video Music Award for Best Hip-Hop Video for her single "Super Bass". The following year, Minaj won another award for Best Female Video for her single "Starships". In 2015 and 2018, she won the awards for Best Hip-Hop Video for "Anaconda" and "Chun-Li". She also won the BET Awards for Best Female Hip Hop Artist from 2010 to 2016.

Throughout 2011 to 2024, Minaj was nominated for a total of 12 Grammy Awards. She received her first Grammy nomination in 2011 in the category Best Rap Performance by a Duo or Group for the single "My Chick Bad" with fellow rapper Ludacris at the 53rd ceremony. For the 54th Grammy Awards in 2012, Minaj received nominations for Best New Artist and Best Rap Album for her debut album Pink Friday, and Best Rap Performance for her single "Moment 4 Life" featuring Drake. In 2015, Minaj received two nominations at the 57th Grammy Awards for Best Rap Song for her single "Anaconda" and Best Pop Duo/Group Performance for her joint single "Bang Bang", with Jessie J and Ariana Grande. For the 58th Grammy Awards in 2016, Minaj received three nominations, including Best Rap Album for her third studio album The Pinkprint. In 2024, Minaj's collaboration "Barbie World" with Ice Spice and Aqua for the film Barbie received two nominations at the 66th Annual Grammy Awards for Best Rap Song and Best Song Written For Visual Media.

In 2020, Minaj was nominated for two Latin Grammy Awards - Record of the Year and Song of the Year - for "Tusa".

Minaj won the Michael Jackson Video Vanguard Award in the 2022 MTV VMAs, becoming the second female rapper to do so, after Missy Elliott.

== American Music Awards ==
The American Music Awards is an annual music awards ceremony and one of several major annual American music awards shows. Minaj has won nine American Music Awards out of twelve nominations.

Year	Nominee / work	Award	Result
2011	Pink Friday	Favorite Rap/Hip-Hop Album	Won
2011	Herself	Favorite Rap/Hip-Hop Artist	Won
2012	Herself	Favorite Rap/Hip-Hop Artist	Won
2012	Herself	Favorite Pop/Rock Female Artist	Nominated
2012	Pink Friday: Roman Reloaded	Favorite Pop/Rock Album	Nominated
2012	Pink Friday: Roman Reloaded	Favorite Rap/Hip-Hop Album	Won
2015	The Pinkprint	Favorite Rap/Hip-Hop Album	Won
2015	Herself	Artist of the Year	Nominated
2015	Herself	Favorite Rap/Hip-Hop Artist	Won
2020	Herself	Favorite Female Artist – Rap/Hip-Hop	Won
2020	"Tusa"	Favorite Song – Latin	Won
2022	Herself	Favorite Female Artist – Rap/Hip-Hop	Won

== ARIA Music Awards ==
The ARIA Music Awards is an annual series of awards nights celebrating the Australian music industry, held and organized by the Australian Recording Industry Association.

Year	Nominee / work	Award	Result
2023	Herself — Queen Radio	Best International Artist	Nominated

== BDB Certified Spin Awards ==
BDB (or BDS) Certified Spin Awards were special achievement recognitions given by Billboard in partnership with Nielsen Broadcast Data Systems (BDS) to songs that achieved major radio airplay milestones.

Year	Nominee / work	Award	Result

== BellaSugar Beauty Awards ==
The BellaSugar Beauty Awards were presented by the pop culture blog PopSugar in 2012 to highlight stars with inner and outer beauty. Minaj has won one award.

Year	Nominee / work	Award	Result
2012	Herself	Best Trendsetter	Won

== BET ==
=== BET Awards ===
The BET Awards were established in 2001 by the Black Entertainment Television (BET) network to celebrate African Americans and other minorities in music, acting, sports, and other fields of entertainment. The awards are presented annually and broadcasts live on BET. Minaj is the first and only female rapper to win the Best Female Hip-Hop Artist award seven years in a row. Overall, she has won eleven awards out of thirty-nine nominations.

Year	Nominee / work	Award	Result
2010	Herself	Best New Artist	Won
2010	Herself	Best Female Hip-Hop Artist	Won
2010	"BedRock" (Young Money featuring Lloyd)	Viewer's Choice	Nominated
2011	Herself	Best Female Hip-Hop Artist	Won
2011	Herself	FANdemonium Award	Nominated
2011	"Moment 4 Life" (Nicki Minaj featuring Drake)	Viewer's Choice	Nominated
2011	"Bottoms Up" (Trey Songz featuring Nicki Minaj)	Viewer's Choice	Nominated
2012	Herself	Best Female Hip-Hop Artist	Won
2012	Herself	FANdemonium Award	Nominated
2013	Herself	Best Female Hip-Hop Artist	Won
2013	Herself	FANdemonium Award	Nominated
2014	Herself	Best Female Hip-Hop Artist	Won
2015	Herself	Best Female Hip-Hop Artist	Won
2015	Herself	FANdemonium Award	Nominated
2015	"Anaconda"	Video of the Year	Nominated
2015	"No Love" (Remix) (August Alsina featuring Nicki Minaj)	Best Collaboration	Nominated
2015	"Only" (Nicki Minaj featuring Drake, Lil Wayne and Chris Brown)	Viewer's Choice	Won
2015	"Throw Sum Mo" (Rae Sremmurd featuring Nicki Minaj and Young Thug)	Viewer's Choice	Nominated
2016	Herself	Best Female Hip-Hop Artist	Won
2016	"Feeling Myself" (Nicki Minaj featuring Beyoncé)	Best Collaboration	Nominated
2017	Herself	Best Female Hip-Hop Artist	Nominated
2018	Herself	Best Female Hip-Hop Artist	Nominated
2018	"I'm Getting Ready" (Tasha Cobbs featuring Nicki Minaj)	Dr. Bobby Jones Best Gospel/Inspirational	Nominated
2018	"MotorSport" (with Migos and Cardi B)	Coca-Cola Viewers' Choice	Nominated
2019	Herself	Best Female Hip-Hop Artist	Nominated
2020	Herself	Best Female Hip-Hop Artist	Nominated
2020	"Hot Girl Summer" (with Megan Thee Stallion and Ty Dolla $ign)	Best Collaboration	Nominated
2020	"Hot Girl Summer" (with Megan Thee Stallion and Ty Dolla $ign)	Coca-Cola Viewers' Choice	Won
2020	"Hot Girl Summer" (with Megan Thee Stallion and Ty Dolla $ign)	Video of the Year	Nominated
2022	Herself	Best Female Hip-Hop Artist	Nominated
2022	"Whole Lotta Money (Remix)" (with Bia)	Best Collaboration	Nominated
2023	Herself	Best Female Hip-Hop Artist	Nominated
2023	"Super Freaky Girl"	Viewer's Choice	Nominated
2024	"Barbie World" (with Ice Spice featuring Aqua)	Video of the Year	Nominated
2024	"Barbie World" (with Ice Spice featuring Aqua)	Best Collaboration	Nominated
2024	"Everybody" (featuring Lil Uzi Vert)	Best Collaboration	Nominated
2024	Herself	Best Female Hip-Hop Artist	Won
2024	"Blessings" (featuring Tasha Cobbs Leonard)	BET Her Award	Nominated
2024	Pink Friday 2	Album of the Year	Nominated

=== BET Hip-Hop Awards ===
The BET Hip Hop Awards are hosted annually by the Black Entertainment Television (BET) network for Hip-Hop performers, producers and music video directors. Minaj has won nine awards out of forty-seven nominations.

Year	Nominee / work	Award	Result
2010	"All I Do Is Win (Remix)" (with YG, Lil Wayne, Rich Homie Quan and Meek Mill)	Reese's Perfect Combo Award	Nominated
2010	"Hello Good Morning (Remix)" (with Diddy – Dirty Money and Rick Ross)	Reese's Perfect Combo Award	Nominated
2010	"BedRock"	Track of the Year	Nominated
2010	Herself	Hustler of the Year	Nominated
2010	Herself	Lyricist of the Year	Nominated
2010	Herself	Made You Look (Best Hip Hop Style)	Won
2010	Herself	Rookie of the Year	Won
2010	"Your Love"	Verizon People's Champ Award	Won
2011	Herself	MVP of the Year	Won
2011	Herself	Lyricist of the Year	Nominated
2011	Herself	Made You Look (Best Hip Hop Style)	Won
2011	Pink Friday	CD of the Year	Nominated
2011	"Monster"	Sweet 16: Best Featured Verse	Nominated
2011	"Moment 4 Life"	Verizon People's Champ (Viewers Choice)	Nominated
2012	Herself	Made You Look (Best Hip Hop Style)	Nominated
2013	Herself	Made You Look (Best Hip Hop Style)	Won
2014	Herself	Made You Look (Best Hip Hop Style)	Won
2014	Herself	MVP of the Year	Nominated
2014	Herself	Lyricist of the Year	Nominated
2014	"My Hitta (Remix)" (with YG, Lil Wayne, Rich Homie Quan and Meek Mill)	People's Champ Award	Nominated
2014	"Pills n Potions"	Best Hip-Hop Video	Nominated
2015	"Feeling Myself" (featuring Beyoncé)	Best Hip-Hop Video	Nominated
2015	"Feeling Myself" (featuring Beyoncé)	Best Collabo, Duo or Group	Nominated
2015	"Truffle Butter" (featuring Drake and Lil Wayne)	Best Collabo, Duo or Group	Nominated
2015	The Pinkprint	Album of the Year	Nominated
2015	Herself	MVP of the Year	Nominated
2015	Herself	Lyricist of the Year	Nominated
2015	Herself	Hustler of the Year	Nominated
2015	Herself	Best Live Performer	Nominated
2015	Herself	Made You Look (Best Hip Hop Style)	Nominated
2016	Herself	Made You Look (Best Hip Hop Style)	Nominated
2016	"Down in the DM (Remix)"	Best Featured Verse	Nominated
2017	Herself	Made-You-Look Award (Best Hip-Hop Style)	Nominated
2017	"Rake It Up" (with Yo Gotti)	Best Collabo, Duo or Group	Nominated
2017	"Rake It Up" (with Yo Gotti)	Best Featured Verse	Won
2018	Herself	Made-You-Look Award	Nominated
2018	"Big Bank"	Sweet 16: Best Featured Verse	Nominated
2020	"Hot Girl Summer" (with Megan Thee Stallion and Ty Dolla $ign)	Best Collaboration	Nominated
2021	"Whole Lotta Money (Remix)" (with Bia)	Best Collaboration	Nominated
2023	"Princess Diana" (with Ice Spice)	Best Collaboration	Nominated
2024	Pink Friday 2	Album of The Year	Won
2024	Herself	Artist of The Year	Nominated
2024	Herself	Best Live Performer	Nominated
2024	Herself	Lyricist of The Year	Nominated
2024	"Everybody" (with Lil Uzi Vert)	Best Collaboration	Nominated
2024	"FTCU"	Song of The Year	Nominated
2024	"Blessings" (with Tasha Cobbs Leonard)	Impact Track	Nominated

=== BET Social Awards ===
The BET Social Awards are an annual awards show, airing on BET, that celebrate the very best (and worst) of social media, including the biggest memes, most popular gifs, hashtags, and all the trends that claim your timeline. Minaj has received one nomination.

Year	Nominee / work	Award	Result
2019	Herself	Best Celeb Follow	Nominated

=== Soul Train Awards ===
The Soul Train Music Awards is an annual award show aired in national broadcast syndication that honors the best in African-American music and entertainment. Minaj has won one award from nine nominations.

Year	Nominee / work	Award	Result
2010	Herself	Best New Artist	Nominated
2010	"Your Love"	Best Hip-Hop Song of the Year	Nominated
2011	"Moment 4 Life" (featuring Drake)	Best Hip-Hop Song of the Year	Won
2012	"Starships"	Best Dance Performance	Nominated
2013	"High School" (featuring Lil Wayne)	Best Hip-Hop Song of the Year	Nominated
2014	"Pills n Potions"	Best Hip-Hop Song of the Year	Nominated
2015	"Feeling Myself" (featuring Beyoncé)	Best Collaboration	Nominated
2015	"Truffle Butter" (featuring Drake and Lil Wayne)	Best Hip-Hop Song of the Year	Nominated
2017	"Rake It Up" (with Yo Gotti)	Rhythm & Bars Award	Nominated

== Billboard ==
=== Billboard Latin Music Awards ===
In 2021, Minaj was nominated six times at the Billboard Latin Music Awards (five times for "Tusa" and once for herself).

Year	Nominee / work	Award	Result
2021	Herself	Crossover Artist of the Year	Nominated
2021	"Tusa" (with Karol G)	Hot Latin Song of the Year	Nominated
2021	"Tusa" (with Karol G)	Vocal Event Hot Latin Song of the Year	Nominated
2021	"Tusa" (with Karol G)	Airplay Song of the Year	Nominated
2021	"Tusa" (with Karol G)	Sales Song of the Year	Nominated
2021	"Tusa" (with Karol G)	Latin Rhythm Song of the Year	Nominated

=== Billboard Music Awards ===
The Billboard Music Awards are sponsored by Billboard magazine. The awards are based on sales data by Nielsen SoundScan and radio information by Nielsen Broadcast Data Systems. Minaj has received five awards out of thirty nominations.

Year	Nominee / work	Award	Result
2011	Herself	Top New Artist	Nominated
2011	Herself	Top Rap Artist	Nominated
2011	Pink Friday	Top Rap Album	Nominated
2011	"Bottoms Up" (Trey Songz featuring Nicki Minaj)	Top R&B Song	Nominated
2012	Herself	Top Female Artist	Nominated
2012	Herself	Top Rap Artist	Nominated
2012	Herself	Top Radio Songs Artist	Nominated
2012	Herself	Top Streaming Songs Artist	Nominated
2012	"Super Bass"	Top Rap Song	Nominated
2012	"Super Bass"	Top Streaming Song (Audio)	Nominated
2012	"Super Bass"	Top Streaming Song (Video)	Won
2013	Herself	Top Female Artist	Nominated
2013	Herself	Top Rap Artist	Won
2013	Herself	Top Radio Songs Artist	Nominated
2013	Herself	Top Streaming Artist	Won
2013	"Starships"	Top Dance Song	Nominated
2013	"Girl on Fire" (with Alicia Keys)	Top R&B Song	Nominated
2013	Pink Friday: Roman Reloaded	Top Rap Album	Won
2015	Herself	Top Rap Artist	Nominated
2015	Herself	Top Streaming Artist	Nominated
2015	"Anaconda"	Top Rap Song	Nominated
2015	The Pinkprint	Top Rap Album	Nominated
2016	"Hey Mama" (with David Guetta, Bebe Rexha and Afrojack)	Top Dance Song	Nominated
2017	Herself	Chart Achievement	Nominated
2018	Herself	Top Rap Female Artist	Nominated
2019	Herself	Top Rap Female Artist	Nominated
2023	Herself	Top Rap Female Artist	Won
2024	Herself	Top Rap Female Artist	Nominated
2024	Herself	Top Rap Touring Artist	Nominated
2024	Pink Friday 2	Top Rap Album	Nominated

=== Billboard.com's Mid-Year Music Awards ===
Within the first half of a year, the general public casts their votes for the annual Billboard.com's Mid-Year Music Awards. The winners are announced at the beginning of July. Minaj has won two awards out of eleven nominations.

Year	Nominee / work	Award	Result
2011	Herself	Best Dressed	Nominated
2012	Herself	First-Half MVP	Nominated
2012	Nicki Minaj vs. Hot 97	Most Memorable Feud	Nominated
2013	Nicki Minaj vs. Mariah Carey	Most Memorable Feud	Won
2014	"Pills n Potions"	Best Music Video	Nominated
2014	"Pills n Potions"	Song That Will Dominate 2014's Second Half	Won
2014	The Pinkprint	Most Anticipated Music Event of 2014's Second Half	Nominated
2015	Herself	First-Half MVP	Nominated
2015	"Feeling Myself" (featuring Beyoncé)	Best Music Video	Nominated
2015	"Bitch I'm Madonna" (with Madonna)	Best Music Video	Nominated
2015	Nicki Minaj and Meek Mill	Hottest Couple	Nominated

=== Billboard Women in Music ===
Billboard Women in Music is an annual ceremony hosted by Billboard, which honours women in music for their roles in music and their accomplishments. Minaj has been honoured two times.

Year	Nominee / work	Award	Result
2011	Herself	Rising Star	Won
2019	Herself	Game Changer	Won

== BMI Awards ==
Broadcast Music, Inc. (BMI) is one of three United States performing rights organizations, along with ASCAP and SESAC. It collects license fees on behalf of songwriters, composers, and music publishers and distributes them as royalties to those members whose works have been performed. Minaj has received forty-seven BMI Awards including eleven BMI London Awards, seven BMI Pop Awards, twenty-seven BMI R&B/Hip-Hop awards and two BMI Trailblazers of Gospel Music Awards.

=== BMI London Awards ===
Year	Nominee / work	Award	Result
2011	"Your Love"	Award-Winning Songs	Won
2011	"Check It Out" (with will.i.am)	Award-Winning Songs	Won
2012	"Where Them Girls At" (with David Guetta and Flo Rida)	Award-Winning Songs	Won
2013	"Starships"	Award-Winning Songs	Won
2013	"Pound the Alarm"	Award-Winning Songs	Won
2013	"Turn Me On" (with David Guetta)	Award-Winning Songs	Won
2013	"Beauty and a Beat" (with Justin Bieber)	Award-Winning Songs	Won
2016	"Hey Mama" (with David Guetta, Bebe Rexha and Afrojack)	Award-Winning Songs	Won
2016	"Hey Mama" (with David Guetta, Bebe Rexha and Afrojack)	Dance Award	Won
2019	"FEFE" (with 6ix9ine and Murda Beatz)	Award-Winning Songs	Won
2019	"MotorSport" (with Migos and Cardi B)	Award-Winning Songs	Won

=== BMI Pop Awards ===
Year	Nominee / work	Award	Result
2012	"Super Bass"	Award-Winning Songs	Won
2013	"Starships"	Award-Winning Songs	Won
2013	"Turn Me On" (David Guetta featuring Nicki Minaj)	Award-Winning Songs	Won
2014	"Beauty and a Beat" (Justin Bieber featuring Nicki Minaj)	Award-Winning Songs	Won
2016	"Bang Bang" (with Jessie J and Ariana Grande)	Award-Winning Songs	Won
2016	"Hey Mama" (David Guetta featuring Nicki Minaj, Bebe Rexha and Afrojack)	Award-Winning Songs	Won
2018	"Side to Side"	Award-Winning Songs	Won

=== BMI R&B/Hip-Hop Awards ===
Year	Nominee / work	Award	Result
2011	"BedRock"	Award-Winning Songs	Won
2011	"Bottoms Up" (with Trey Songz)	Award-Winning Songs	Won
2011	"My Chick Bad" (with Ludacris)	Award-Winning Songs	Won
2011	"Your Love"	Award-Winning Songs	Won
2012	"Super Bass"	Urban Song of the Year	Won
2012	"Super Bass"	Award-Winning Songs	Won
2012	"Fly" (Nicki Minaj featuring Rihanna)	Award-Winning Songs	Won
2012	"Make Me Proud" (Drake featuring Nicki Minaj)	Hot R&B/Hip-Hop Airplay & Hot R&B/Hip-Hop Songs	Won
2012	"Make Me Proud" (Drake featuring Nicki Minaj)	Hot Rap Songs	Won
2012	"Moment 4 Life" (Nicki Minaj featuring Drake)	Award-Winning Songs	Won
2013	Herself	Songwriters of the Year (along with Benny Blanco)	Won
2013	"Starships"	Song of the Year	Won
2013	"Starships"	Award-Winning Songs	Won
2013	"Dance (A$$)" (Big Sean featuring Nicki Minaj)	Award-Winning Songs	Won
2013	"Girl on Fire" (Alicia Keys featuring Nicki Minaj)	Award-Winning Songs	Won
2013	"Make Me Proud" (Drake featuring Nicki Minaj)	Award-Winning Songs	Won
2014	"Love More" (with Chris Brown)	Award-Winning Songs	Won
2015	"Anaconda"	Award-Winning Songs	Won
2016	"All Eyes on You" (with Meek Mill and Chris Brown)	Award-Winning Songs	Won
2016	"Only" (featuring Drake, Lil Wayne and Chris Brown)	Award-Winning Songs	Won
2016	"Truffle Butter" (featuring Drake and Lil Wayne)	Award-Winning Songs	Won
2016	"The Night Is Still Young"	Award-Winning Songs	Won
2017	"Do You Mind" (with DJ Khaled)	Award-Winning Songs	Won
2018	"Rake It Up" (with Yo Gotti)	Award-Winning Songs	Won
2019	"Big Bank" (with YG, 2 Chainz and Big Sean)	Award-Winning Songs	Won
2019	"FEFE" (with 6ix9ine and Murda Beatz)	Award-Winning Songs	Won
2019	"MotorSport" (with Migos and Cardi B)	Award-Winning Songs	Won

=== BMI Trailblazers of Gospel Music Awards ===
Year	Nominee / work	Award	Result
2020	"I'm Getting Ready" (with Tasha Cobbs Leonard)	Award-Winning Songs	Won
2020	"I'm Getting Ready" (with Tasha Cobbs Leonard)	Song of the Year	Won

== Boston Music Awards ==
The Boston Music Awards are a set of music awards given annually that showcase talent in the area of Boston, Massachusetts.

Year	Nominee / work	Award	Result
2021	"Whole Lotta Money (Remix)" (with Bia)	Song of the Year (1 Million+ Streams)	Won

== Bravo Otto ==
The Bravo Otto is a German accolade honoring excellence of performers in film, television and music. The award is presented in Gold, Silver and Bronze. Minaj has received three Bronze (for third place) awards.

Year	Nominee / work	Award	Result
2012	Herself	Super-Rapper	Bronze
2013	Herself	Super-Rapper	Bronze
2015	Herself	Super-Rapper	Bronze

== Break the Internet Awards ==
Paper's Break the Internet Awards celebrate Internet culture, fashion, music, art and social media. Voting takes place over the Internet. Minaj has received two nominations.

Year	Nominee / work	Award	Result
2018	Queen	Music Drop of the Year	Nominated
2018	Queen Album Art	Instagram Photo of the Year	Nominated

== BRIT Awards ==
The Brit Awards are the British Phonographic Industry's annual popular music awards. Minaj has won one award out of two nominations.

Year	Nominee / work	Award	Result
2012	Herself	International Breakthrough Act	Nominated
2019	"Woman Like Me" (with Little Mix)	British Artist Video of the Year	Won

== Capital FM ==
=== Capital FM's Music Video Awards ===
The British radio station Capital FM was handing out the Capital FM's Music Video Awards to honor the accomplishments of stars and their music video in 2012. Minaj has received five nominations.

Year	Nominee / work	Award	Result
2013	Nas and Nicki Minaj – "Right By My Side"	Best Kiss	Nominated
2013	"Starships"	Raunchiest Video	Nominated
2013	"Pound the Alarm"	Best You Could Never Wear That In Real Life Outfit	Nominated
2013	"Beauty and a Beat" (with Justin Bieber)	Best Video	Nominated
2013	"Starships"	Best Video	Nominated

=== Capital Loves Awards ===
The British radio station Capital FM established the Capital Loves Awards to honor musicians and artist that are successful in the United Kingdom. Minaj has received one nomination.

Year	Nominee / work	Award	Result
2014	"Bang Bang" (with Jessie J and Ariana Grande)	Best Single	Nominated

=== Capital Twitter Awards ===
Year	Nominee / work	Award	Result
2013	Herself	Most Revealing Pictures	Nominated
2014	Herself	Most #Selfie Obsessed Star	Nominated

== Capricho Awards ==
The Capricho Awards was an annual awards with categories consisting of music, TV, cinema, Internet, among others and organized by the Brazilian teen magazine Capricho, with open voting on the official website of Editora Abril. Minaj has won one award out of two nominations.

Year	Nominee / work	Award	Result
2011	Herself	Revelação Internacional	Won
2015	Nicki Minaj vs. Taylor Swift	Bafo do Ano	Nominated

== Caribbean Music Awards ==
The Caribbean Music Awards is a platform, to recognize, honor, and celebrate Caribbean talent who have made significant contributions to the enhancement of Caribbean music and culture. Minaj has won one award.

Year	Nominee / work	Award	Result
2023	"Likkle Miss"(with Skeng)	Collaboration of the Year (Dancehall/Reggae)	Won
2026	"Eskimo"(with Trinidad killa)	Soca Collaboration of the Year	Won

== Clio awards ==
The Clio Awards, or simply The Clios, is an annual award in advertising that recognizes creative excellence and innovation in communication and design, judged by advertising professionals from around the world. The awards are presented by Evolution Media

Year	Nominee / work	Award	Result
2025	Pink Friday 2 - Gag City	Album Launch/Artist Promotion Integrated Campaign	bronze

== Cosmopolitan Awards ==
Year	Nominee / work	Award	Result
2013	Pink Friday by Nicki Minaj	Best Celebrity Fragrance	Won

== Dorian Awards ==
The Dorian Awards are an annual endeavor organized by GALECA: The Society of LGBTQ Entertainment Critics (founded in 2009 as the Gay and Lesbian Entertainment Critics Association). GALECA is an association of professional journalists and critics covering film and television for print, online, and broadcast outlets in the United States, Canada, and the United Kingdom. Minaj has received one nomination.

Year	Nominee / work	Award	Result
2014	"Anaconda"	Video of the Year	Nominated

== Ebony ==
Ebony is a monthly magazine that focuses on news, culture, and entertainment; its target audience is the African–American community, and its coverage includes the lifestyles and accomplishments of influential black people, fashion, beauty, and politics. Minaj has been honored on their Power 100 list in 2012.

Year	Nominee / work	Award	Result
2012	Herself	Honorees	Won

== Fashion Los Angeles Awards ==
The Fashion Los Angeles Awards is an annual ceremony created by The Daily Front Row in 2015 to honor the best in fashion in Hollywood. Minaj has won one award.

Year	Nominee / work	Award	Result
2017	Herself	Fashion Rebel	Won

== Global Awards ==
The Global Awards are held by Global and reward music played on British radio stations including Capital, Capital XTRA, Heart, Classic FM, Smooth, Radio X, LBC and Gold, with the awards categories reflecting the songs, artists, programmes and news aired on each station. Minaj has won one award.

Year	Nominee / work	Award	Result
2019	"Woman Like Me" (with Little Mix)	Best Song	Won

== Grammy Awards ==
A Grammy Award (stylized as GRAMMY, originally called Gramophone Award), or Grammy, is an award presented by The Recording Academy to recognize achievements in the music industry. Minaj has been nominated 12 times since 2011.

Year	Nominee / work	Award	Result
2011	"My Chick Bad" (with Ludacris)	Best Rap Performance by a Duo or Group	Nominated
2012	Herself	Best New Artist	Nominated
2012	Loud (as featured artist)	Album of the Year	Nominated
2012	"Moment 4 Life" (featuring Drake)	Best Rap Performance	Nominated
2012	Pink Friday	Best Rap Album	Nominated
2015	"Anaconda"	Best Rap Song	Nominated
2015	"Bang Bang" (with Jessie J and Ariana Grande)	Best Pop Duo/Group Performance	Nominated
2016	"Only" (featuring Drake, Lil Wayne and Chris Brown)	Best Rap/Sung Collaboration	Nominated
2016	"Truffle Butter" (featuring Drake and Lil Wayne)	Best Rap Performance	Nominated
2016	The Pinkprint	Best Rap Album	Nominated
2024	"Barbie World" (with Ice Spice featuring Aqua)	Best Rap Song	Nominated
2024	"Barbie World" (with Ice Spice featuring Aqua)	Best Song Written For Visual Media	Nominated

== Guinness World Records ==
The Guinness World Records, known from its inception from 1955 until 2000 as The Guinness Book of Records and in previous United States editions as The Guinness Book of World Records, is a reference work published annually, listing world record both of human achievements and the extremes of the natural world. Minaj currently holds three records.

Year	Nominee / work	Award	Result
2017	Herself	Most Billboard Hot 100 entries by a solo artist (female)	Won
2021	Herself	Most US singles chart entries before reaching No.1	Won
2021	"Say So (Remix)" (with Doja Cat)	First female rap duo to reach No.1 on the US singles chart	Won

== Heat Latin Music Awards ==
The Heat Latin Music Awards is an annual awards show that airs on the HTV cable channel, which is usually held in early June, that honors the year's biggest Latin music acts, as voted by HTV viewers. Minaj has won one award out of two nominations.

Year	Nominee / work	Award	Result
2019	"Krippy Kush (Remix)"	Mejor Colaboración	Nominated
2020	"Tusa" (with Karol G)	Mejor Video	Won

== HipHopDX ==
HipHopDX is an online magazine of hip hop music criticism and news. Minaj has won four HipHopDX Year End Awards out of seven nominations and five HipHopDX Turkey Awards.

=== HipHopDX Year End Awards ===
Year	Nominee / work	Award	Result
2010	Herself	Emcee of the Year	Nominated
2010	"Monster"	Collaboration of the Year	Won
2010	"Monster"	Verse of the Year	Won
2012	Pink Friday: Roman Reloaded	Best Album of the Year	Won
2013	Nicki Minaj's Halloween Costume	Instagram of the Year	Nominated
2014	"Anaconda" Artwork	Instagram of the Year	Nominated
2018	Queen	Best Album of the Year	Won

=== HipHopDX Turkey Awards ===
Year	Nominee / work	Award	Result
2009	Herself	The "Stanley Kubrick: Can't Stop Watching" Award	Won
2010	Drake and Nicki Minaj's Marriage	The Wasting Our Time Award	Won
2016	Nicki Minaj and RetcH	The Joanne The Scammer Award	Won
2017	Nicki Minaj and Remy Ma	The Beef for Breakfast, Lunch and Dinner Award	Won
2018	Herself	The Sore Loser Award	Won

== iHeartRadio ==
=== iHeartRadio Music Awards ===
The iHeartRadio Music Awards is an international music awards show, founded by iHeartRadio in 2014, and recognizes the most popular artists and music over the past year as determined by the network's listeners. Minaj has won 2 awards out of 14 nominations.

Year	Nominee / work	Award	Result
2015	"Bang Bang" (with Jessie J and Ariana Grande)	Best Collaboration	Won
2016	"Truffle Butter" (Nicki Minaj featuring Drake and Lil Wayne)	Hip-Hop Song of the Year	Nominated
2016	"Hey Mama" (David Guetta featuring Nicki Minaj, Bebe Rexha and Afrojack)	Dance Song of the Year	Nominated
2016	Herself	Best Fan Army	Nominated
2017	"Side to Side" (with Ariana Grande)	Best Music Video	Nominated
2018	"Swish Swish" (with Katy Perry)	Best Music Video	Nominated
2020	"Hot Girl Summer" (with Megan Thee Stallion and Ty Dolla $ign)	Best Lyrics	Nominated
2021	"Tusa" (with Karol G)	Latin Pop/Reggaeton Song of the Year	Won
2023	"Super Freaky Girl"	Best Lyrics	Nominated
2023	"Super Freaky Girl"	TikTok Bop of the Year	Nominated
2023	Herself (Barbz)	Best Fan Army	Nominated
2023	"Super Freaky Girl"	Favorite Use of a Sample	Nominated
2024	"Barbie World" (with Ice Spice featuring Aqua)	Best Collaboration	Nominated
2024	Herself (Barbz)	Best Fan Army	Nominated
2025	Pink Friday 2 World Tour	Favorite Tour Style	Nominated
2025	Pink Friday 2 World Tour	Favorite Tour Tradition	Nominated

=== iHeartRadio MMVAs ===
The iHeartRadio MMVAs (originally an initialism of Much Music Video Awards) are annual awards presented by the Canadian television channel Much to honour the year's best music videos. Minaj has received four nominations.

Year	Nominee / work	Award	Result
2010	"BedRock"	International Video of the Year – Group	Nominated
2012	"Starships"	International Video of the Year – Artist	Nominated
2012	"Turn Me On" (David Guetta featuring Nicki Minaj)	International Video of the Year – Artist	Nominated
2013	"Va Va Voom"	International Video of the Year – Artist	Nominated

== International Dance Music Awards ==
The International Dance Music Awards are held annually as part of the Winter Music Conference. Minaj has won two awards out of fifteen nominations.

Year	Nominee / work	Award	Result
2012	"Super Bass"	Best R&B/Urban Dance Track	Nominated
2012	"Super Bass"	Best Rap/Hip Hop Dance Track	Won
2012	"Where Them Girls At" (David Guetta featuring Flo Rida and Nicki Minaj)	Best Rap/Hip Hop Dance Track	Nominated
2012	Herself	Best Break-Through Artist (Solo)	Nominated
2013	"Starships"	Best Rap/Hip Hop Dance Track	Nominated
2013	"Pound the Alarm"	Best R&B/Urban Dance Track	Nominated
2013	"Make Me Proud" (Drake featuring Nicki Minaj)	Best R&B/Urban Dance Track	Nominated
2015	"Anaconda"	Best Rap/Hip Hop Dance Track	Nominated
2015	"Bang Bang" (with Jessie J and Ariana Grande)	Best Rap/Hip Hop/Trap Dance Track	Nominated
2016	"Hey Mama" (David Guetta feat. Nicki Minaj, Bebe Rexha and Afrojack)	Best R&B/Urban Dance Track	Nominated
2016	"Hey Mama" (David Guetta feat. Nicki Minaj, Bebe Rexha and Afrojack)	Best Rap/Hip Hop/Trap Dance Track	Won
2016	"Throw Sum Mo" (Rae Sremmurd featuring Nicki Minaj and Young Thug)	Best Rap/Hip Hop/Trap Dance Track	Nominated
2016	"Truffle Butter" (featuring Drake and Lil Wayne)	Best Rap/Hip Hop/Trap Dance Track	Nominated
2016	"Bitch I'm Madonna" (Madonna featuring Nicki Minaj)	Best Commercial/Pop Dance Track	Nominated
2016	"Bitch I'm Madonna" (Madonna featuring Nicki Minaj)	Best Music Video	Nominated

== Japan Gold Disc Awards ==
The Japan Gold Disc Awards are a prestigious awards ceremony held annually in Japan, winners are based mainly on sales that provided by "The Recording Industry Association of Japan" (RIAJ). Minaj has won one award.

Year	Nominee / work	Award	Result
2012	Herself	Best International 3 New Artists	Won

== JIM Awards ==
The JIM Awards (Flemish: De Jimmies) were an annual awards show presented by the Flemish television channel JIM since 2012 and ceased broadcast in 2015. Minaj has received four nominations.

Year	Nominee / work	Award	Result
2013	Herself	Best Urban	Nominated
2015	Herself	Best Urban	Nominated
2015	Herself	Best Female International	Nominated
2015	"Anaconda"	Best Video	Nominated

== Latin American Music Awards ==
The Latin American Music Awards (Latin AMAs) is an annual American music award that is presented by Telemundo. Minaj has won three awards.

Year	Nominee / work	Award	Result
2021	"Tusa" (with Karol G)	Collaboration of the Year	Won
2021	"Tusa" (with Karol G)	Favorite Urban Song	Won
2021	"Tusa" (with Karol G)	Song of the Year	Won

== Latin Grammy Awards ==
A Latin Grammy Award is an award by The Latin Recording Academy to recognize outstanding achievement in the Latin music industry. Minaj has received two nominations.

Year	Nominee / work	Award	Result
2020	"Tusa" (with Karol G)	Record of the Year	Nominated
2020	"Tusa" (with Karol G)	Song of the Year	Nominated

== Latin Music Italian Awards ==
The Latin Music Italian Awards, abbreviated as LMIAs, is a musical event that takes place annually in the city of Milan. Minaj has won two awards out of four nominations.

Year	Nominee / work	Award	Result
2020	"Tusa" (with Karol G)	Best Latin Song	Won
2020	"Tusa" (with Karol G)	Best Spanglish Song	Nominated
2020	"Tusa" (with Karol G)	Best Latin Collaboration	Won
2020	"Tusa" (with Karol G)	Best Latin Female Video	Nominated

== LOS40 Music Awards ==
LOS40 Music Awards, formerly known as Premios 40 Principales, is an award show by the musical radio station Los 40 Principales. Minaj has won one award out of three nominations.

Year	Nominee / work	Award	Result
2012	Herself	Best International New Act	Nominated
2020	"Tusa" (with Karol G)	Best Latin Song	Nominated
2020	"Tusa" (with Karol G)	Best Latin Video	Won

== MOBO Awards ==
The Music of Black Origin (MOBO) Awards were established in 1996 by Kanya King. It is held annually in the United Kingdom to recognize artists of any race or nationality performing music of black origin. Minaj has won one award out of four nominations.

Year	Nominee / work	Award	Result
2010	Herself	Best International Act	Nominated
2011	Herself	Best International Act	Nominated
2012	Herself	Best International Act	Won
2014	Herself	Best International Act	Nominated

== monitorLATINO Music Awards ==
The monitorLATINO Music Awards, celebrated in Playa del Carmen, are the first-ever awards organized by Monitor Latino in the world and they are 100% based on airplay across radio stations in Latin American countries and Hispanic radio stations in the United States using the Radio Tracking Data, LLC in real time. Minaj has won two awards.

Year	Nominee / work	Award	Result
2020	"Tusa" (with Karol G)	Canción Año Urbana	Won
2020	"Tusa" (with Karol G)	Colaboración del Año	Won

== MP3 Music Awards ==
The MP3 Music Awards (MMA) is an annual music awards show in the United Kingdom, and chosen by worldwide public votes. Minaj has won one award from four nominations.

Year	Nominee / work	Award	Result
2011	"Super Bass"	Music Industry Choice Award	Won
2012	"Fireball" (Willow Smith featuring Nicki Minaj)	Best / Teen / Music	Nominated
2012	"Turn Me On" (David Guetta featuring Nicki Minaj)	House / Dance / Trance	Nominated
2014	"Anaconda"	Radio / Charts / Downloads	Nominated

== MTV ==
=== MTV Africa Music Awards ===
The MTV Africa Music Awards (also known as the MAMAs) were established in 2008 by MTV Networks Africa to celebrate the most popular contemporary music in Africa. Minaj has won one award.

Year	Nominee / work	Award	Result
2015	Herself	Best International Act	Won

=== MTV Europe Music Awards ===
The MTV Europe Music Awards (EMAs) were established in 1994 by MTV Networks Europe to celebrate the most popular songs and singers in Europe. The MTV Europe Music Awards today is a popular celebration of what MTV viewers consider the best in music. The awards are chosen by MTV viewers. Minaj has won twelve awards out of twenty-nine nominations.

Year	Nominee / work	Award	Result
2012	Herself	Best Female	Nominated
2012	Herself	Best Hip-Hop	Won
2012	Herself	Best Look	Nominated
2014	Herself	Best Female	Nominated
2014	Herself	Best Hip-Hop	Won
2014	Herself	Best Look	Nominated
2014	Herself	Biggest Fans	Nominated
2015	Herself	Best Female	Nominated
2015	Herself	Best Hip-Hop	Won
2015	Herself	Best US Act	Nominated
2015	Herself	Best Look	Nominated
2015	"Hey Mama" (David Guetta featuring Nicki Minaj, Bebe Rexha and Afrojack)	Best Collaboration	Nominated
2018	Herself	Best Hip-Hop	Won
2018	Herself	Best Look	Won
2019	Herself	Best Hip-Hop	Won
2020	"Tusa" (with Karol G)	Best Video	Nominated
2020	"Tusa" (with Karol G)	Best Collaboration	Won
2021	Herself	Best Hip-Hop	Won
2022	"Super Freaky Girl"	Best Song	Won
2022	"Super Freaky Girl"	Best Video	Nominated
2022	Herself	Best Hip Hop	Won
2022	Herself	Best Artist	Nominated
2022	Herself/Barbz	Biggest Fans	Nominated
2023	Herself	Best Artist	Nominated
2023	Herself	Best Hip Hop	Won
2023	Herself	Best US Act	Won
2023	Herself/Barbz	Biggest Fans	Nominated
2024	Herself	Best Hip Hop	Nominated
2024	Herself/Barbz	Biggest Fans	Nominated

=== MTV Fandom Awards ===
The MTV Fandom Awards are an annual pop culture, television and film awards show presented by MTV with awards voted on by fans. Minaj has received one nomination.

Year	Nominee / work	Award	Result
2015	Barbz	Fandom Army of the Year	Nominated

=== MTV Italian Music Awards ===
The MTV Italian Music Awards (known as TRL Awards from 2006 to 2012) were established in 2006 by MTV Italy to celebrate the most popular artists and music videos in Italy. Minaj has received one nomination.

Year	Nominee / work	Award	Result
2012	Herself	Best Look	Nominated

=== MTV MIAW Awards ===
The MTV MIAW Awards (formerly MTV Millennial Awards) is an annual program of Latin American music awards, presented by the cable channel MTV Latin America to honor the best of Latin music and the digital world of the millennial generation.

Year	Nominee / work	Award	Result
2019	Cardi B vs. Nicki Minaj	Ridiculous of the Year	Won
2020	"Say So (Remix)" (with Doja Cat)	Hit Global	Nominated
2020	"Say So (Remix)" (with Doja Cat)	Feat Gringo	Nominated

=== MTV O Music Awards ===
The O Music Awards (commonly abbreviated as the OMAs) was an awards show presented by MTV to honor music, technology and intersection between the two. Minaj has won one award out of six nominations.

Year	Nominee / work	Award	Result
2010	Herself	Fan Army FTW	Nominated
2010	Herself	Must Follow Artist on Twitter	Nominated
2010	Herself	Favorite Animated GIF	Won
2011	Herself	Fan Army FTW	Nominated
2012	Herself	Too Much Ass for TV	Nominated
2012	Herself	Most Intense Social Splat	Nominated

=== MTV Video Music Awards ===
The MTV Video Music Awards (commonly abbreviated as the VMAs) were established in 1984 by MTV to honor the top music videos of the year. Minaj has won eight awards out of twenty-five nominations.

Year	Nominee / work	Award	Result
2010	"Massive Attack" (featuring Sean Garrett)	Best New Artist	Nominated
2011	"Super Bass"	Best Female Video	Nominated
2011	"Super Bass"	Best Hip-Hop Video	Won
2011	"Moment 4 Life" (featuring Drake)	Best Collaboration	Nominated
2012	"Beez in the Trap" (featuring 2 Chainz)	Best Hip-Hop Video	Nominated
2012	"Starships"	Best Female Video	Won
2012	"Turn Me On" (with David Guetta)	Best Visual Effects	Nominated
2015	"Anaconda"	Best Female Video	Nominated
2015	"Anaconda"	Best Hip-Hop Video	Won
2015	"Bang Bang" (with Jessie J and Ariana Grande)	Best Collaboration	Nominated
2015	"Hey Mama" (with David Guetta, Afrojack and Bebe Rexha)	Song of Summer	Nominated
2017	"Side to Side" (with Ariana Grande)	Best Choreography	Nominated
2018	"Chun-Li"	Best Hip Hop Video	Won
2019	"Hot Girl Summer" (with Megan Thee Stallion and Ty Dolla $ign)	Best Power Anthem	Won
2020	"Tusa" (with Karol G)	Best Collaboration	Nominated
2020	"Tusa" (with Karol G)	Best Latin	Nominated
2022	"Super Freaky Girl"	Song of Summer	Nominated
2022	"Do We Have a Problem?" (with Lil Baby)	Best Hip-Hop	Won
2022	Herself	Michael Jackson Video Vanguard Award	Won
2023	"Super Freaky Girl"	Video of the Year	Nominated
2023	"Super Freaky Girl"	Best Hip-Hop	Won
2023	"Super Freaky Girl"	Best Visual Effects	Nominated
2023	Herself	Artist of the Year	Nominated
2023	"Love in the Way" (with Yung Bleu)	Best R&B	Nominated
2023	"Barbie World" (with Ice Spice featuring Aqua)	Song of Summer	Nominated

=== MTV Video Music Awards Brazil ===
The MTV Video Music Awards Brazil (originally Video Music Awards Brazil), more commonly known as VMB, were MTV Brasil's annual award ceremony, established in 1995. Minaj has received one nomination.

Year	Nominee / work	Award	Result
2012	Herself	Best International Act	Nominated

=== MTV Video Music Awards Japan ===
The MTV Video Music Awards Japan is the Japanese version of the MTV Video Music Awards. In this event artists are awarded for their songs and videos through online voting from channel viewers. Minaj has received eight nominations.

Year	Nominee / work	Award	Result
2011	"Check It Out" (with will.i.am)	Best Collaboration	Nominated
2012	"Where Them Girls At" (David Guetta featuring Flo Rida and Nicki Minaj)	Best Dance Video	Nominated
2012	"Where Them Girls At" (David Guetta featuring Flo Rida and Nicki Minaj)	Best Male Video	Nominated
2013	"Girl on Fire" (Alicia Keys featuring Nicki Minaj)	Best Female Video	Nominated
2013	"Girl on Fire" (Alicia Keys featuring Nicki Minaj)	Best R&B Video	Nominated
2013	"Beauty and a Beat" (Justin Bieber featuring Nicki Minaj)	Best Male Video	Nominated
2013	"Beauty and a Beat" (Justin Bieber featuring Nicki Minaj)	Best Pop Video	Nominated
2015	"Bitch I'm Madonna" (Madonna featuring Nicki Minaj)	Best Female Video	Nominated

=== MTV Platinum Video Plays Awards ===
Year	Nominee / work	Award	Result
2012	"Super Bass"	Gold	Won
2012	"Where Them Girls At" (David Guetta featuring Nicki Minaj and Flo Rida)	Platinum	Won
2013	"Starships"	Platinum	Won
2013	"Turn Me On" (David Guetta featuring Nicki Minaj)	Platinum	Won

=== MTV2 Sucker Free Awards ===
Year	Nominee / work	Award	Result
2010	"Hello Good Morning (Remix)" (with Diddy – Dirty Money and Rick Ross)	Remix of the Year	Nominated
2010	"Hold Yuh (Remix)" (with Gyptian)	Remix of the Year	Nominated
2010	"My Chick Bad"	Verse of the Year	Nominated
2010	"Roger That"	The People's Crown	Nominated
2010	"5 Star Chick (Remix)"	Remix of the Year	Nominated
2011	Herself	Artist That Ran 2011	Nominated

=== Other accolades ===
Year	Nominee / work	Award	Result
2010	Herself	Hottest MC in the Game	Nominated
2010	Herself	MTV News's Hottest Breakthrough MC	Nominated
2010	Herself	MTV News's Woman of the Year	Nominated
2010	Herself	MTVU's Woman of the Year	Won
2011	Herself	Hottest MC in the Game	Nominated

== NAACP Image Awards ==
An NAACP Image Award is an accolade presented by the American National Association for the Advancement of Colored People to honor outstanding people of color in film, television, music, and literature. Minaj has received one nomination.

Year	Nominee / work	Award	Result
2011	Herself	New Artist	Nominated

== NARM Awards ==
The National Association of Recording Merchandisers (NARM) was established in 1958 and is a United States not-for-profit trade association that serves music retailing businesses in lobbying and trade promotion. Minaj has received one award.

Year	Nominee / work	Award	Result
2011	Herself	Breakthrough Artist of the Year	Won

== NET Honours ==
The NET Honours debuted in 2013 as a special recognition award presented to deserving individuals in the Nigerian entertainment industry during the Nigerian Entertainment Conference Live (NEC Live) event, organised by Netng. Minaj has received one nomination.

Year	Nominee / work	Award	Result
2020	Herself	Most Popular Foreign Celebrity (Female)	Nominated
2021	Herself	Most Popular Foreign Celebrity (Female)	Nominated
2022	Herself	Most Popular Foreign Celebrity (Female)	Won

== NewNowNext Awards ==
The NewNowNext-Awards is an American annual entertainment awards show, presented by the lesbian, gay, bisexual and transgender-themed channel Logo. Minaj has received one nomination.

Year	Nominee / work	Award	Result
2013	Herself	Best New Do	Nominated

== New York Music Awards ==
The New York Music Awards is an annual awards ceremony and live concert, established in 1986 with its first sold-out show at Madison Square Garden, New York City, United States. Minaj has won five awards.

Year	Nominee / work	Award	Result
2011	Herself	Best Female Hip-Hop Artist	Won
2011	Herself	Debut Artist of the Year	Won
2011	"Monster"	Best Featured Hip-Hop Artist	Won
2011	Pink Friday	Best Debut Hip-Hop Album	Won
2011	"Your Love"	Best Debut Hip-Hop Single	Won

== Nickelodeon Kids' Choice Awards ==
The Nickelodeon Kids' Choice Awards, also known as the KCAs or Kids Choice Awards, is an annual awards show that airs on the Nickelodeon cable channel, that honors the year's biggest television, movie, and music acts, as voted by Nickelodeon viewers. Minaj has won two awards out of six nominations.

Year	Nominee / work	Award	Result
2015	Herself	Favorite Female Artist	Nominated
2015	"Bang Bang" (with Jessie J and Ariana Grande)	Favorite Song of the Year	Won
2016	Herself	Favorite Female Artist	Nominated
2017	Side to Side (with Ariana Grande)	Best Song	Nominated
2017	Herself	Favorite Female Artist	Nominated
2024	"Barbie World" (with Ice Spice featuring Aqua)	Favorite Music Collaboration	Won

== NRJ Music Awards ==
The NRJ Music Awards were created in 2000 by the radio station NRJ in partnership with the television network TF1. They give out awards to popular musicians by different categories. Minaj has received six nominations.

Year	Nominee / work	Award	Result
2013	Herself	International Female Artist of the Year	Nominated
2013	"Beauty and a Beat" (Justin Bieber featuring Nicki Minaj)	Video of the Year	Nominated
2015	"Hey Mama" (David Guetta featuring Nicki Minaj, Bebe; Rexha & Afrojack)	Video of the Year	Nominated
2020	"Tusa" (with Karol G)	International Song of the Year	Nominated
2020	"Tusa" (with Karol G)	International Collaboration of the Year	Nominated
2022	"Super Freaky Girl"	Cover/Adaptation of the Year	Nominated

== Nylon Beauty Hit List Awards ==
Year	Nominee / work	Award	Result
2024	Pink Friday press-on nails	The Extravagant Press-Ons	Won

== Online Film & Television Association ==
Online Film & Television Association Award is an Internet award for film and television. Minaj won 1 award for her son for the Barbie Film called Barbie World with Ice Spice & Aqua (band).

Year	Nominee / work	Award	Result
2023	Barbie World	Best Adapted song	Won

== People's Choice Awards ==
The People's Choice Awards is an American awards show established in 1974 that recognizes the people and the work of popular culture, and is voted on by the general public. Minaj has won six awards out of fifteen nominations.

Year	Nominee / work	Award	Result
2012	Herself	Favorite Hip-Hop Artist	Nominated
2013	Herself	Favorite Hip-Hop Artist	Won
2015	Herself	Favorite Hip-Hop Artist	Nominated
2015	"Bang Bang" (with Jessie J and Ariana Grande)	Favorite Song	Nominated
2016	Herself	Favorite Hip-Hop Artist	Won
2018	Herself	The Female Artist of 2018	Won
2018	Queen	The Album of 2018	Won
2022	Herself	The Female Artist of 2022	Nominated
2022	"Super Freaky Girl"	The Song of 2022	Nominated
2022	"Do We Have a Problem?" (with Lil Baby)	The Collaboration of 2022	Nominated
2024	Herself	The Female Artist of 2024	Nominated
2024	Herself	The Social Celebrity of 2024	Nominated
2024	Herself	The Hip-Hop Artist of 2024	Won
2024	"Barbie World" (with Ice Spice featuring Aqua)	The Collaboration Song of 2024	Won
2024	Pink Friday 2	The Album of 2024	Nominated

== Premios Juventud ==
Los Premios Juventud (Youth Awards) is an awards show for Spanish-speaking celebrities in the areas of film, music, sports, fashion, and pop culture, presented by the television network Univision. Minaj has received one nomination.

Year	Nominee / work	Award	Result
2020	"Tusa" (with Karol G)	La Más Pegajosa (Can't Get Enough of this Song)	Won

== Premios Lo Nuestro ==
Los Premios Lo Nuestro (Spanish for "Our Thing") is a Spanish-language awards show honoring the best of Latin music, presented by Univision, a Spanish-language television network based in the United States. Minaj has won two awards out of four nominations.

Year	Nominee / work	Award	Result
2021	"Tusa" (with Karol G)	"Crossover" Collaboration of the Year	Nominated
2021	"Tusa" (with Karol G)	Song of the Year	Won
2021	"Tusa" (with Karol G)	Urban – Collaboration of the Year	Won
2021	"Tusa" (with Karol G)	Urban – Song of the Year	Nominated

== Premios MUSA ==
Los Premios MUSA (Musa Awards) are presented by Ibero Americana Radio Chile to highlight the best of music in Chile. Minaj has received one nomination.

Year	Nominee / work	Award	Result
2020	"Tusa" (with Karol G)	International Latin Song of the Year	Nominated

== Premios Nuestra Tierra ==
The Premios Nuestra Tierra or Our Country Awards is an annual Colombian music award show.

Year	Nominee / work	Award	Result
2020	"Tusa" (with Karol G)	Song of the Year	Won
2020	"Tusa" (with Karol G)	Public's Favorite Song	Won
2020	"Tusa" (with Karol G)	Urban Song	Won
2020	"Tusa" (with Karol G)	Best Video	Nominated

== Premios Tu Música Urbano ==
The Premios Tu Música Urbano is a music industry awards ceremony launched by Telemundo Puerto Rico in 2019 to recognize artists who "transcended and boosted the success of Latin urban music around the world" for the past year. Minaj has received one nomination.

Year	Nominee / work	Award	Result
2019	"Tusa" (with Karol G)	Canción Femenina	Nominated

== Premios Quiero ==
Los Premios Quiero is an awards show created by the music channel Quiero música en mi idioma to honor the best of Spanish-speaking music. Minaj has won one award out of two nominations.

Year	Nominee / work	Award	Result
2020	"Tusa" (with Karol G)	Mejor Video Urbano 2020	Nominated
2020	"Tusa" (with Karol G)	Video Del Año 2020	Won

== Q Awards ==
The Q Awards were the UK's annual music awards run by the music magazine Q. They were one of Britain's biggest and best publicised music awards, helped in no small part by the often boisterous behavior of the celebrities who attend the event. Minaj has received one nomination.

Year	Nominee / work	Award	Result
2012	"Starships"	Best Video	Nominated

== Radio Disney Music Awards ==
The Radio Disney Music Awards (RDMA) is an annual awards show operated and governed by Radio Disney, an American radio network. Minaj has received one nomination.

Year	Nominee / work	Award	Result
2013	"Beauty and a Beat"	Song of the Year	Nominated

== Rolling Loud Awards ==
The Rolling Loud Awards is an annual awards show operated and governed by Rolling Loud, a global hip-hop festival and brand.

Year	Nominee / work	Award	Result
2024	Herself	Best Female Artist	Won

== Shorty Awards ==
The Shorty Awards, also known as the "Shortys", is an annual awards show recognizing the people and organizations that produce real-time short form content across Twitter, Facebook, Tumblr, YouTube, Instagram and the rest of the social web. Minaj has received one nomination.

Year	Nominee / work	Award	Result
2016	Herself	Best Musician	Nominated

== Spotify Awards ==
The Spotify Awards, celebrated in Mexico City, are the first-ever awards organized by Spotify in the world and they are 100% based on user-generated data in Mexico. Minaj has won one award.

Year	Nominee / work	Award	Result
2020	"Tusa" (with Karol G)	The Monday Song	Won

== Steeple Awards ==
The Steeple Awards are an annual gospel music awards ceremony established in 2016 and powered by the gospel radio station Praise 102.5. Minaj has won one award.

Year	Nominee / work	Award	Result
2018	"I'm Getting Ready" (with Tasha Cobbs Leonard)	Collaboration of the Year	Won

== Stellar Awards ==
The Stellar Awards is an awards show presented by SAGMA to recognize achievements in the gospel music industry. They are the first of the Big Two major gospel music awards held annually. Minaj has received one nomination.

Year	Nominee / work	Award	Result
2018	"I'm Getting Ready" (with Tasha Cobbs Leonard)	Urban/Inspirational Single or Performance of the Year	Nominated

== Teen Choice Awards ==
The Teen Choice Awards were established in 1999 to honor the year's biggest achievements in music, movies, sports and television, as voted for by young people aged between 13 and 19 years. Minaj has won four awards out of twenty-two nominations.

Year	Nominee / work	Award	Result
2010	Herself	Choice Breakout Artist: Female	Nominated
2010	Young Money	Choice Music: Group	Nominated
2011	Herself	Choice R&B/Hip-Hop Artist	Nominated
2011	"Super Bass"	Choice Summer Song	Nominated
2012	Herself	Choice R&B/Hip-Hop Artist	Won
2012	Herself	Choice Fashion Icon: Female	Nominated
2012	"Starships"	Choice R&B/Hip-Hop Song	Won
2013	Herself	Choice R&B/Hip-Hop Artist	Nominated
2013	"Beauty and a Beat" (Justin Bieber featuring Nicki Minaj)	Choice Single: Male	Won
2014	Herself	Choice R&B/Hip-Hop Artist	Nominated
2014	Herself	Choice Summer Music Star: Female	Nominated
2014	"Pills n Potions"	Choice R&B/Hip-Hop Song	Nominated
2015	Herself	Choice R&B/Hip-Hop Artist	Won
2015	Herself	Choice Summer Music Star: Female	Nominated
2015	Herself	Choice Social Media Queen	Nominated
2015	"Bang Bang" (with Jessie J and Ariana Grande)	Choice Single: Female	Nominated
2015	"Hey Mama" (David Guetta featuring Nicki Minaj, Bebe; Rexha and Afrojack)	Choice Music Collaboration	Nominated
2016	Herself	Choice R&B/Hip-Hop Artist	Nominated
2016	"Barbershop: The Next Cut"	Choice Movie Actress: Comedy	Nominated
2017	Herself	Choice R&B/Hip-Hop Artist	Nominated
2018	Herself	Choice R&B/Hip-Hop Artist	Nominated
2019	Herself	Choice R&B/Hip-Hop Artist	Nominated

== Telehit Awards ==
The Telehit Awards (Spanish: Premios Telehit) are annual award show run by the Mexican music channel Telehit. Minaj has won two awards out of three nominations.

Year	Nominee / work	Award	Result
2013	"Beauty and a Beat" (ft Nicki Minaj)	Song of the Public	Won
2014	Herself	The Golden Butt	Won
2017	"Swalla"	Song of the Year	Nominated

== The Source ==
The Source is an American hip hop and entertainment website, and a magazine that publishes annually or semiannually. Minaj has been honoured as the Woman of the Year in 2012.

Year	Nominee / work	Award	Result
2012	Herself	Woman of the Year	Won

== The Boombox Fan Choice Awards ==
The Boombox Fan Choice Awards are presented by American hip-hop online publication The Boombox since 2014. Minaj has received six nominations and won once.

Year	Nominee / work	Award	Result
2015	Anaconda	Hip-Hop Video of the Year	Won
2015	Anaconda	Hip-Hop Song of the Year	Nominated
2015	Yasss Bish	Hip-Hop Song of the Year	Nominated
2015	Danny Glover (Remix)	Hip-Hop Song of the Year	Nominated
2015	No Love	R&B Song of the Year	Nominated
2015	Flawless (Remix)	R&B Song of the Year	Nominated

== TheDrop.fm Music Awards ==
TheDrop.fm Music Awards were an annual online accolade presented by the digital music platform TheDrop.fm, celebrating achievements in mainstream and underground hip-hop and R&B. Minaj has won two award

Year	Nominee / work	Award	Result
2012	Herself	Best Female Rapper	Won
2012	"Beez in the Trap"	Best Hip-Hop Song	Won

== UK Asian Music Awards ==
The UK Asian Music Awards (UK AMA) is an awards show that is held annually in the United Kingdom since 2002. Award winners are decided by public voting, from a list of nominees presented by the event organizers. Minaj has won one award.

Year	Nominee / work	Award	Result
2011	"2012 (It Ain't the End)" (Jay Sean featuring Nicki Minaj)	Best Video	Won

== Urban Music Awards ==
The Urban Music Awards (UMA) is a hip-hop, R&B, dance and soul music awards ceremony launched by Jordan Kensington in 2003 and now held in several countries. Minaj has received two nominations.

Year	Nominee / work	Award	Result
2011	Herself	International Artist of the Year	Nominated
2018	Herself	International Artist of the Year	Nominated

== UB Honors Awards ==
The "UB Honors" are awards presented annually by UrbanBridgez.com to celebrate achievements in urban entertainment. They acknowledge accomplishments in music, TV, film, and other related fields.

Year	Nominee / work	Award	Result
2017	Herself	Best Hip Hop Artist	Won
2017	""Rake It Up""	Best Hip Hop Song	Won
2017	""Rake It Up""	Best Video of the Year	Won
2017	""Do You Mind""	Hottest Collaboration of the Year	Won
2017	Herself	Artist Of the Year	Nominated
2025	Herself	Best Rap Artist	Won

== VH1 ==
=== VH1's Do Something Awards ===
The Do Something Awards is the joint awards show by "Do Something Services" and VH1. It is the national award show honouring people for community service, the nation's best, young world-changers. They also honour awards for style, music artists, social networks and movie stars. Minaj has received one nomination.

Year	Nominee / work	Award	Result
2012	Nicki Minaj and Ricky Martin	Do Something Style	Nominated

=== VH1 Big In 2015 with Entertainment Weekly ===
Year	Nominee / work	Award	Result
2015	Herself	Honorees	Won

=== VH1P Awards ===
The VH1P Awards are the first-ever awards presented by VH1 India to celebrate their 16th birthday, honoring the best moments of music and pop culture from the past sixteen years. Minaj has won three awards out of three nominations.

Year	Nominee / work	Award	Result
2021	"Anaconda"	Best 'Scandalize Your Parents' Song	Won
2021	"Roman's Revenge"	Best Diss Track	Won
2021	"Super Bass"	Best Pump Me Up Track	Won

== Virgin Media Music Awards ==
The Virgin Media Music Awards were an online music awards show run by Virgin Media. Minaj has received two nominations.

Year	Nominee / work	Award	Result
2011	Nicki Minaj & Rihanna	Best Collaboration	Nominated
2012	"Starships"	Best Video	Nominated

== Webby Award ==
A Webby Award is an award for excellence on the Internet presented annually by The International Academy of Digital Arts and Sciences, a judging body composed of over two thousand industry experts and technology innovators. Minaj has received one nomination.

Year	Nominee / work	Award	Result
2016	"Miley, what's good?"	Gif of the Year	Nominated

== World Music Awards ==
The World Music Awards is an international awards show founded in 1989 under the high patronage of Albert II, Prince of Monaco and is based in Monte Carlo. Minaj has received seventeen nominations.

Year	Nominee / work	Award	Result
2014	"Beauty and a Beat"	World's Best Video	Nominated
2014	"Freaks"	World's Best Song	Nominated
2014	"Freaks"	World's Best Video	Nominated
2014	"Give Me All Your Luvin'"	World's Best Song	Nominated
2014	"Give Me All Your Luvin'"	World's Best Video	Nominated
2014	Herself	World's Best Entertainer of the Year	Nominated
2014	Herself	World's Best Female Artist	Nominated
2014	Herself	World's Best Live Act	Nominated
2014	"I'm Out"	World's Best Song	Nominated
2014	"I'm Out"	World's Best Video	Nominated
2014	"Love More"	World's Best Song	Nominated
2014	"Love More"	World's Best Video	Nominated
2014	Pink Friday: Roman Reloaded	World's Best Album	Nominated
2014	"Starships"	World's Best Song	Nominated
2014	"Starships"	World's Best Video	Nominated
2014	"Turn Me On"	World's Best Song	Nominated
2014	"Turn Me On"	World's Best Video	Nominated

== XXL Awards ==
The XXL Awards recognised the best in hip-hop in 2012. The nominees and winners were picked by the XXL staff, excluding the winners in the big five biggest categories which was determined by public vote. Minaj has received eleven nominations. In 2022 and 2024, XXL announced Minaj as the winner of "The Peoples Champ". Minaj has won two awards.

Year	Nominee / work	Award	Result
2013	"Beauty and a Beat"	Best Rapper/Non-Rapper Collaboration	Nominated
2013	"Beauty and a Beat"	Best Rap Verse on a Justin Bieber Record	Nominated
2022	Herself	Female Rapper of the Year	Nominated
2022	Herself	The Peoples Champ	Won
2023	Herself	The Peoples Champ	Nominated
2024	Herself	Artist of the Year	Nominated
2024	Herself	Female Rapper of the Year	Nominated
2024	Herself	The People's Champ	Won
2024	Pink Friday 2	Album of the Year	Nominated
2024	"Barbie World" (with Ice Spice featuring Aqua)	Song of the Year	Nominated
2024	"Barbie World" (with Ice Spice featuring Aqua)	Video of the Year	Nominated
2025	Herself	Artist of the Year	Nominated
2025	Herself	Female Rapper of the Year	Nominated
2025	Herself	The People's Champ	Nominated
2025	Herself	Performer of the Year	Nominated

== YouTube Music Awards ==
The YouTube Music Awards (commonly abbreviated as YTMA) is an awards show presented by YouTube to honor the best in the music video medium. Minaj has won one award out of three nominations.

Year	Nominee / work	Award	Result
2013	"Beauty and a Beat" (with Justin Bieber)	Video of the Year	Nominated
2013	Herself	Artist of the Year	Nominated
2015	Herself	50 Artists to Watch	Won

== YouTube Creator Awards ==
YouTube Creator Awards, commonly known as YouTube Play Buttons or YouTube Plaques, are a series of awards from the American video platform YouTube that aim to recognize its most popular channels. They are based on a channel's subscriber count. Nicki Minaj's channel currently has 27.5 million subscribers as of now.

Year	Nominee / work	Award	Result
2011-2012	Nicki Minaj	Silver Play Buttons for 100k subscribers	Silver
2011-2012	Nicki Minaj	Gold Play Buttons for 1M subscribers	Gold
2011-2012	Nicki Minaj	Diamond Play Buttons 10M subscribers	Diamond

== Z Awards ==
The Z Awards were created by Z100, a commercial contemporary hit radio (CHR) radio broadcasting serving the New York metropolitan area. The votes are submitted by the listeners. The categories include year in music, pop culture, sleaze and others. Minaj has won two awards out of four nominations.

Year	Nominee / work	Award	Result
2011	Pink Friday	Album of the Year	Nominated
2011	Herself	Breakout Star of the Year	Won
2011	Herself	Best New Artist	Won
2012	Mariah Carey vs. Nicki Minaj	Biggest Drama	Nominated

== 4Music Video Honours ==
4Music is a music and entertainment channel in the United Kingdom. They give awards to the best artists or music videos based on votes from the general public. Minaj has won two awards out of ten nominations.

Year	Nominee / work	Award	Result
2011	Herself	Best Girl	Nominated
2011	"Super Bass"	Best Big Beat	Won
2011	"Super Bass"	Best Video	Nominated
2011	"Where Them Girls At"	Best Big Beat	Nominated
2012	Herself	Best Girl	Nominated
2012	"Starships"	Best R&B/Dance	Won
2012	"Starships"	Best Video	Nominated
2012	"Give Me All Your Luvin'" (Madonna featuring Nicki Minaj and M.I.A.)	Best Video	Nominated
2012	"Pound the Alarm"	Best Video	Nominated
2012	"Turn Me On" (David Guetta featuring Nicki Minaj)	Best Video	Nominated

== Other accolades ==
=== Spotify Plaques ===
When an artist's song reaches one billion streams on Spotify, they receive a large black plaque featuring a shiny silver plate with the Spotify logo, as well as their name and the title of the song. Minaj has won seven Spotify Plaques.

Year	Nominee / work	Award	Result
2021	"Tusa" (with Karol G)	One Billion Streams Award	Won
2021	"Side to Side" (with Ariana Grande)	One Billion Streams Award	Won
2022	"Bang Bang" (with Ariana Grande and Jessie J)	One Billion Streams Award	Won
2023	"Swalla" (with Jason Derulo and Ty Dolla $ign)	One Billion Streams Award	Won
2023	"Starships"	One Billion Streams Award	Won
2024	"Beauty And A Beat" (with Justin Bieber)	One Billion Streams Award	Won
2025	"Super Bass"	One Billion Streams Award	Won

=== Listicles ===
Name of publisher, name of listicle, year listed and result
Publisher	Listicle	Year(s)	Result	Ref.
Billboard	The 10 Greatest Pop Stars Never To Be Greatest For A Year	2006	5th	
Billboard	The Greatest Pop Stars By Year (1981–2022)	2010	Rookie of the Year	
Billboard	The Greatest Pop Stars By Year (1981–2022)	2014	Honorable Mention	
Billboard	Year-End Top Artists	2010	35th	
Billboard	Year-End Top Artists	2011	7th	
Billboard	Year-End Top Artists	2012	6th	
Billboard	Year-End Top Artists	2013	33rd	
Billboard	Year-End Top Artists	2014	21st	
Billboard	Year-End Top Artists	2015	10th	
Billboard	Year-End Top Artists	2016	54th	
Billboard	Year-End Top Artists	2017	50th	
Billboard	Year-End Top Artists	2018	26th	
Billboard	Year-End Top Artists	2022	58th	
Billboard	Year-End Top Artists	2023	35th	
Billboard	Year-End Top Artists	2024	33th	
Billboard	Year-End Top R&B/Hip-Hop Artists	2010	47th	
Billboard	Year-End Top R&B/Hip-Hop Artists	2011	2nd	
Billboard	Year-End Top R&B/Hip-Hop Artists	2012	3rd	
Billboard	Year-End Top R&B/Hip-Hop Artists	2013	19th	
Billboard	Year-End Top R&B/Hip-Hop Artists	2014	10th	
Billboard	Year-End Top R&B/Hip-Hop Artists	2015	4th	
Billboard	Year-End Top R&B/Hip-Hop Artists	2016	33rd	
Billboard	Year-End Top R&B/Hip-Hop Artists	2017	38th	
Billboard	Year-End Top R&B/Hip-Hop Artists	2018	13th	
Billboard	Year-End Top R&B/Hip-Hop Artists	2019	49th	
Billboard	Year-End Top R&B/Hip-Hop Artists	2022	24th	
Billboard	Year-End Top R&B/Hip-Hop Artists	2023	15th	
Billboard	Year-End Top R&B/Hip-Hop Artists	2024	10th	
Billboard	Year-End Hot 100 Artists	2024	30th	
Billboard	Year-End Hot 100 Songs	2010	52th (Bottoms Up)	
Billboard	Year-End Hot 100 Songs	2010	56th (My Chick Bad)	
Billboard	Year-End Hot 100 Songs	2010	66th (Your Love)	
Billboard	Year-End Hot 100 Songs	2011	8th (Super Bass)	
Billboard	Year-End Hot 100 Songs	2011	50th (Moment 4 Life)	
Billboard	Year-End Hot 100 Songs	2011	64th (Bottoms Up)	
Billboard	Year-End Hot 100 Songs	2011	88th (Where Them Girls At)	
Billboard	Year-End Hot 100 Songs	2012	9th (Starship)	
Billboard	Year-End Hot 100 Songs	2012	35th (Turn me on)	
Billboard	Year-End Hot 100 Songs	2012	57th (Dance(A$$))	
Billboard	Year-End Hot 100 Songs	2012	75th (Pound the Alarm)	
Billboard	Year-End Hot 100 Songs	2013	42nd (Beauty and a beat)	
Billboard	Year-End Hot 100 Songs	2013	49th (Girl on Fire)	
Billboard	Year-End Hot 100 Songs	2014	27th (Bang Bang)	
Billboard	Year-End Hot 100 Songs	2014	36th (Anaconda)	
Billboard	Year-End Hot 100 Songs	2015	31st (Hey Mama)	
Billboard	Year-End Hot 100 Songs	2015	51st (Only)	
Billboard	Year-End Hot 100 Songs	2015	66th (Truffle Butter)	
Billboard	Year-End Hot 100 Songs	2015	69th (All Eyes on You)	
Billboard	Year-End Hot 100 Songs	2015	80th (Bang Bang)	
Billboard	Year-End Hot 100 Songs	2016	69th (Down in the DM)	
Billboard	Year-End Hot 100 Songs	2016	77th (Side to Side)	
Billboard	Year-End Hot 100 Songs	2017	43rd (Side to Side)	
Billboard	Year-End Hot 100 Songs	2017	53rd (Rake It Up)	
Billboard	Year-End Hot 100 Songs	2017	85th (Swalla)	
Billboard	Year-End Hot 100 Songs	2018	31st (Fefe)	
Billboard	Year-End Hot 100 Songs	2018	34th (Motorsport)	
Billboard	Year-End Hot 100 Songs	2018	63rd (Big Bank)	
Billboard	Year-End Hot 100 Songs	2018	74th (Plain Jane)	
Billboard	Year-End Hot 100 Songs	2019	93rd (Hot Girl Summer)	
Billboard	Year-End Hot 100 Songs	2022	56th (Super Freaky Girl)	
Billboard	Year-End Hot 100 Songs	2023	46th (Barbie World)	
Billboard	Year-End Hot 100 Songs	2023	69th (Princess Diana)	
Billboard	Year-End Hot 100 Songs	2023	79th (Super Freaky Girl)	
Billboard	Year-End Hot 100 Songs	2024	71st (Everybody)	
Billboard	Year-End Hot 100 Songs	2024	88th (FTCU)	
Billboard	Year-End Top R&B/Hip-Hop Artists– Female	2024	3rd	
Billboard	Year-End Top Rap Artists	2024	9th	
Billboard	Year-End Top Rap Artists – Female	2022	3rd	
Billboard	Year-End Top Rap Artists – Female	2023	1st	
Billboard	Year-End Top Rap Artists – Female	2024	2nd	
Billboard	Year-End Top Rap Albums Artists	2024	10th	
Billboard	Year-End Top Rap Albums	2024	8th (Pink Friday 2)	
Billboard	Year-End Billboard 200 artists	2024	36th	
Billboard	Year-End Billboard 200 Albums	2024	30th (Pink Friday 2)	
Billboard	Year-End Billboard Global 200 Artists	2022	79th	
Billboard	Year-End Billboard Global 200 Artists	2023	95th	
Billboard	Year-End Digital Song Sales Artists	2024	14th	
Billboard	Year-End Digital Song Sales	2024	44th (Big Foot)	
Billboard	Year-End Digital Song Sales	2024	49th (FTCU)	
Billboard	Year-End Hot Gospel Songs	2024	9th (Blessings)	
Billboard	The 10 Defining Artists of the 2010s (So Far)	2015	6th	
Billboard	Greatest of All Time Hot 100 Women Artists	2017	44th	
Billboard	Greatest of All Time Pop Songs Artists	2017	50th	
Billboard	Decade-End Top Artists	2019	15th	
Billboard	Decade-End Top R&B/Hip-Hop Artists 2010s	2019	4th	
Billboard	Decade-End Billboard 200	2019	86th	
Billboard	Decade-End Billboard 200	2019	124th	
Billboard	Top Artists of the 2010s	2020	15th	
Billboard	The 100 Greatest Music Video Artists of All Time: Staff List	2020	58th	
Billboard	Billboard's Greatest Pop Stars of 2022	2022	10th	
Billboard	50 Greatest Rappers of All Time	2023	10th	
Billboard	The 500 Best Pop Songs: Staff List	2023	13th (Super Bass)	
Billboard	Artist With 100 or More Billboard Hot 100 Chart Hits	2023	Placed	
Billboard	The 100 Best Songs of 2023: Staff Picks	2023	13th (Princess Diana)	
Billboard	The 100 Best Album Covers of All Time	2023	63rd (The Pinkprint)	
Billboard	Top Tours March 2024	2024	6th (26.9M)	
Billboard	The 100 Greatest Rap Albums of All Time: Staff List	2024	69th (Pink Friday)	
Billboard	Billboard's Greatest Pop Stars of the 21st Century	2024	13th	
Billboard	Highest Grossing Rap Tour for a Woman	2024	Pink Friday 2 World Tour	
Billboard	Top-Grossing Hip-Hop Touring Acts of All Time	2024	11th	
Billboard	Billboard ’s Greatest Pop Stars of the 21st Century	2024	13th	
Billboard	Top Women Artists of the 21st Century	2025	16th	
Billboard	The 25 Best Female Rappers of All Time	2025	1st	
Billboard	Top R&B/Hip-Hop Artists of the 21st Century	2025	17th	
Billboard	Top R&B/Hip-Hop Albums of the 21st Century	2025	46th(Pink Friday)	
Brandwatch	Most Influential Women on Twitter	2016	20th	
Brandwatch	Most Influential People on Twitter	2021	41st	
Brandwatch	Most Influential People on Twitter	2022	47th	
Brandwatch	The Top 20 Most Followed Instagram Accounts	2023	19th	
Bustle	These 10 GOATs Are Paving The Way In Their Respective Fields	2021	7th	
Complex	The Best Rapper Alive, Every Year Since 1979	2010	Honorable Mention	
Complex	The Best Rapper Alive, Every Year Since 1979	2014	1st	
Complex	The Best Rap Verse of the Month	2017	1st (Motorsport)	
Complex	The Best Verses of 2017	2017	16th (Motorsport)	
Complex	The Best Rap Verses of 2021	2021	12th (Fractions)	
Complex	Top 50 Greatest Female Rappers of All Time	2022	1st	
Complex	50 Best New York Rappers of All Time	2023	7th	
Complex	Hip-Hop’s 20 Greatest Diss Tracks	2024	16th (Roman's Revenge)	
Entertainment Weekly	Entertainers of the Year	2015	Placed	
Forbes	Hip Hop Cash Kings 2011	2011	9th	
Forbes	Cash Kings 2012: Hip-Hop's Top Earners	2012	8th	
Forbes	30 Under 30	2012	Placed	
Forbes	2013 Hip-Hop Cash Kings	2013	4th	
Forbes	2014 Hip-Hop Cash Kings	2014	11th	
Forbes	Cash Kings 2015: The World's Highest Paid Hip-Hop Acts	2015	9th	
Forbes	Cash Kings 2016: Hip-Hop's Highest-Earning Acts	2016	6th	
Forbes	Highest-Paid Hip-Hop Acts 2017	2017	16th	
Forbes	Highest-Paid Hip-Hop Acts 2019	2019	12th	
Forbes	Highest Paid Hip-Hop Artists List	2020	16th	
Forbes	The 50 Top Rappers Of All Time	2024	8th	
Google	Most-Searched-For Entertainment	2010	8th	
Google	Top Trending	2010	4th	
Google	Most-Searched-For entertainment	2011	5th (Super Bass Lyrics)	
Google	Most-Searched People	2011	4th	
Google	Most-Searched Image	2012	9th	
Harper's Bazaar	The Best Summer Songs to Add to Your Playlists Now	2021	Placed (Itty Bitty Piggy)	
Harper's Bazaar	65 of the Best Songs from the 2000s	2023	Placed (Itty Bitty Piggy)	
The Hollywood Reporter	25 Platinum Players in Music	2023	Placed	
Insider	The 20 Top Artists of the Decade	2019	Placed	
NME	The 50 Best Songs	2023	39th (Pound Town 2)	
Pitchfork	The Top 30 Artists You Need to Follow on Social Media	2016	26th	
Pitchfork	The 200 Best Songs of the 2010s	2019	175th (Come on a Cone)	
Pitchfork	The 200 Best Songs of the 2010s	2019	150th (Beez in the Trap)	
Pitchfork	The 200 Best Songs of the 2010s	2019	124th (Super Bass)	
Pitchfork	The 200 Best Songs of the 2010s	2019	38th (Monster)	
Pitchfork	The 200 Best Albums of the 2010s	2019	166th (The Pinkprint)	
Pitchfork	The 200 Most Important Artists of Pitchfork's First 25 Years	2021	Placed	
Pitchfork	2021 Song of the Summer	2021	Placed (For the Love of New York)	
Pitchfork	Most Formative Rap Albums	2023	Placed (Beam Me Up Scotty)	
Rolling Stone	King of Hip-Hop	2011	6th	
Rolling Stone	100 Greatest Hip-Hop Songs of All Time	2017	69th (Monster)	
Rolling Stone	The 100 Greatest Songs of the Century	2018	66th (Beez in the Trap)	
Rolling Stone	The 100 Best Songs of the 2010s	2019	44th (Beez in the Trap)	
Rolling Stone	The Biggest Influences on Pop in the 2010s	2019	Named	
Rolling Stone	The 100 Greatest Music Videos	2021	82nd (Anaconda)	
Rolling Stone	The 500 Greatest Songs of All Time	2021	426th (Super Bass)	
Rolling Stone	The 200 Greatest Hip-Hop Albums of All Time	2022	31st (Pink Friday)	
Rolling Stone	Hip-Hop and Rolling Stone: 50 Iconic Covers	2023	Placed	
Rolling Stone	The 150 Greatest Hip-Hop Videos of All Time	2023	77th (Anaconda)	
Rolling Stone	The 250 Greatest Albums of the 21st Century So Far	2025	73rd(Pink Friday)	
Spotify	US Top Female Artists	2018	4th	
Spotify	Biggest debut for a female hip hop album	2023	Pink Friday 2 (28.2 million)	
Spotify	Top 10 most streamed rap albums in 24 hours of all time	2023	5th (Pink Friday 2)	
Spotify	Most streamed female rapper on Spotify in 2023	2023	Herself (5.1 billion)	
Time	The 100 Most Influential People	2016	Placed	
VH1	VH1's 100 Greatest Women In Music	2012	40th	
VH1	VH1 Big In 2015 with Entertainment Weekly	2015	Honored	
Vibe	30 Greatest Women Guest Verses In Hip-Hop History	2025	2nd(Monster)	
Vibe	30 Greatest Women Guest Verses In Hip-Hop History	2025	12th(Hello, Good Morning (Remix))	
XXL	The 20 Best Female Rappers of All Time	2014	Placed	
XXL	Top 50 Greatest Female Rappers of All Time	2022	1st	
YouGov	The Most Famous Rap & Hiphop Music Artists (Q3 2023)	2023	pk. 5th	
YouGov	The Most Famous All-time Music Artists (Q3 2023)	2023	74th	
