= Versus (9ice album) =

Studio album by 9ice
- Released: 7 December 2011
- Recorded: 2009–2011
- Genre: Afrobeats; fuji; hip hop
- Length: 68:59
- Language: Yoruba; English; Nigerian Pidgin
- Label: Alapomeji Ancestral
- Producer: ID Cabasa; Puffy Tee; Red Eye; Tee-Y Mix; Cheepho; Spellz; Duncan Mighty; D'Tunes

9ice chronology
Bashorun Gaa (2011)	Versus (2011)	CNN (2014)

Singles from Versus
- 1. "Loni Ni" / "Safarawe" / "Atamatase" Released: 12 February 2010; 2. "All The Way" Released: 9 November 2010; 3. "Health is Wealth" Released: 6 March 2011; 4. "Insanity" Released: 30 October 2011

Versus is the fifth studio album by Nigerian singer 9ice. It was released on 7 December 2011 by Alapomeji Ancestral Records in conjunction with Bashorun Gaa. The album features a blend of Afrobeats and hip hop. The album was titled Versus because it includes many guest artists, with 9ice framing the collaborations as lyrical face-offs rather than standard features. The artists featured on the album include 2Face Idibia, Banky W., Duncan Mighty, Seriki, Mode 9, V.I.P, Tiwa Savage, Wizkid, Dagrin, M.I, Ajayi Brovas, Kwaw Kese, Timaya, Kwam 1, and Wizboyy. Production was handled by ID Cabasa, Puffy Tee, Tee-Y Mix, Cheepho, Spellz, Duncan Mighty, E.L, and D'Tunes. The fifth track off the album, "Iya Alariya", was supposed to feature King Sunny Adé, but the label failed to make time to get Adé and 9ice in the studio. Versus was nominated for Best R&B/Pop Album at The Headies 2012.

== Background and promotion ==
Versus was delayed three times; it was initially scheduled for release in December 2010, but got pushed back. It got pushed back again to March 2011, but was not released. The album's release was much anticipated due to a publicised feud 9ice had with Nigerian rapper Ruggedman. In an interview with Channels TV, 9ice said that the dual release of Versus (and Bashorun Gaa) was inspired by how Fuji singers released multiple albums in a year. In a separate interview with Showtime Celebrity, he explained the album's delayed release was to allow his previous album, Tradition (2009), time to breathe and gain momentum.

9ice promoted Versus with an album launch concert on 11 March 2012 held at the Eko Hotel in Lagos. The concert featured a stage decorated with native and street themes. Guest performers included Tiwa Savage, P-Square, Wizkid, and members of the Coded Tunes collective, such as Lord of Ajasa, Jahbless, and Reminisce. Other appearances included Wande Coal, Don Jazzy, and Fuji musician Kwam 1. Abimbola Fashola, wife of the Lagos State governor was in attendance at the concert. The concert included performances of tracks from Versus as well as previously released tracks.

=== Singles ===
The album's initial singles, "Loni Ni", "Safarawe", and "Atamatase", were all released on 12 February 2010, with "Loni Ni" featuring a guest appearance from Dagrin, "Safarawe" featuring M.I, and "Atamatase" featuring Mode 9. Following those three singles, "All The Way" featuring P-Square was released on 9 November 2010. The music video for "Loni Ni" premiered on 14 November 2011, and was directed by GINI. "Health is Wealth" featuring fuji musician Kwam 1 was released on 6 March 2011 as another single off the album. The final single, "Insanity" was released on 30 October 2011, featuring Kwaw Kese. The music video for the opening track, "Life Is Beautiful" featuring 2Baba, was released on 5 April 2015 and was directed by HG2 Filmworks.

== Composition ==
Versus is a conceptual album built around the idea of 9ice collaborating with and musically "going against" other Nigerian artists. Each track features a different guest, including 2Face Idibia, Wizkid, M.I, Tiwa Savage, Banky W., Dagrin, and Kwam 1, among others. The songs explore a variety of styles and themes, ranging from soulful introspection ("Life is Beautiful") to energetic dance tracks filled with Yoruba expressions ("On Point") and raunchy pop blends ("Tempo"). 9ice also draws from his Fuji roots on his collaboration with Kwam 1, while tracks with rappers like M.I and Dagrin bring a competitive edge, with lyrics that touch on rivalry and street credibility. While the album highlights 9ice's versatility and ability to hold his own across genres, some critics noted that it occasionally feels more like a collection of individual tracks than a fully cohesive body of work.

== Critical reception ==
Professional ratings
Review scores
Source	Rating
Nigerian Entertainment Today	3.5/5 stars
Jaguda	7/10
Should You Bump This	8.5/10
TayoTV	8.5/10

Ayomide Tayo from Nigerian Entertainment Today rated the album a 3.5 out of 5, saying that Versus "sometimes sounds like a collection of songs and not an album." He then stated that "9ice can go toe to toe with some of the best names in the land even though he isn't ready to beat some of them yet." Sho and Tunde from Should You Bump This rated the album a 2 out of 5. Sho wrote that "he should just get back to making music with ID Cabasa.", while Tunde noted that "9ice fails to deliver any standout hit on this album." Wilfred Okiche of YNaija described the album as uneven and overlong, noting that it "played like a collection of hit singles cobbled together" and ultimately judged that Bashorun Gaa "emerged victor" over it. Ayo Jaguda reviewed the album track-by-track and gave it a rating of 7/10, while Teaponpi of TayoTV did the same and rated Versus 8.5/10.

=== Accolades ===
Awards and nominations for Versus
Organization	Year	Category	Result	Ref.
The Headies	2012	Best R&B/Pop Album	Nominated	

== Track listing ==
Versus track listing
No.	Title	Writer(s)	Producer(s)	Length
1.	"Beautiful" (9ice vs. 2Face Idibia)	Abolore Akande; Innocent Idibia	D'Tunes	5:07
2.	"Good Day" (9ice vs. V.I.P)	Akande; Abdul Ibrahim; Emmanuel Ababio; Joseph Nana Ofori	Puffy Tee; E.L	4:04
3.	"On Point" (9ice vs. Wizkid)	Akande; Ayodeji Balogun	Spellz	3:49
4.	"Tempo" (9ice vs. Banky W)	Akande; Olubankole Wellington	ID Cabasa	4:27
5.	"Iya Alariya"	Akande		3:55
6.	"Safe Journey" (9ice vs. Kayefi)	Akande; Lawal Funmilayo	Cheepho	4:22
7.	"Everything" (9ice vs. Tiwa Savage)	Akande; Tiwatope Savage	Tee-Y Mix	4:44
8.	"All the Way" (9ice vs. P-Square)	Akande; Peter Okoye; Paul Okoye	Cheepho	4:16
9.	"I Matter" (9ice vs. Timaya)	Akande; Inetimi Odon	Puffy Tee	4:40
10.	"GbonGilaGila" (9ice vs. Seriki)	Akande; Ibiyemi Seriki	Cheepho	3:33
11.	"Insanity" (9ice vs. Kwaw Kese)	Akande; Emmanuel Botwe	Red Eye	4:42
12.	"This Life" (9ice vs. Duncan Mighty)	Akande; Duncan Mighty	Duncan Mighty	4:20
13.	"Safarawe" (9ice vs. M.I Abaga)	Akande; Jude Abaga	Cheepho	5:06
14.	"Atamatase" (9ice vs. Mode 9)	Akande; Babatunde Adewale	Cheepho	5:09
15.	"Health Is Wealth" (9ice vs. KWAM 1)	Akande; Wasiu Ayinde	ID Cabasa	3:37
16.	"Loni Ni" (9ice vs. Dagrin)	Akande; Oladapo Olaonipekun	Cheepho	3:48
17.	"Ego" (9ice vs. Wizboyy)	Akande; Isioma Ofuasia	Cheepho	3:44
18.	"Appetizer" (9ice vs. Ajayi Brovas)	Akande; Ajayi Brovas	Cheepho	3:42
Total length:				68:59

== Personnel ==
- 9ice – vocals
- Wizboyy – vocals
- Dagrin – vocals
- KWAM 1 – vocals
- Duncan Mighty – vocals
- Ajayi Brovas – vocals
- 2Face Idibia – vocals
- Mode 9 – vocals
- 2Baba – vocals
- P-Square – vocals
- Wizkid – vocals
- Timaya – vocals
- Seriki – vocals
- V.I.P – vocals
- Kwaw Kese – vocals
- M.I – vocals
- Tiwa Savage – vocals
- Banky W. – vocals
- Kayefi – vocals
- Puffy Tee – production
- E.L – production
- D'Tunes – production
- Tee-Y Mix – production
- ID Cabasa – production
- Cheepho – production
- Spellz – production
- Red Eye – production
- Duncan Mighty – production
- Cheepho – mixing, mastering

== Release history ==
Release history and formats for Versus
Region	Date	Format	Label
Nigeria	7 December 2011	CD; digital download	Alapomeji Ancestral
