= Double Dare (Darey album) =

Double Dare (HeartBeat)

Studio album by Darey
- Released: 28 February 2011
- Recorded: 2009–2011
- Studio: SMS (Abuja)
- Genres: Afrobeat; pop; soul; electronic; R&B
- Length: 38:02 (Heart); 43:38 (Beat)
- Label: Soul Muzik
- Producers: Darey (also exec.); Deola Art Alade (exec.); Cobhams Asuquo; Wayne McNeish; eLDee; Don Jazzy; Del B; Password

Darey chronology
Undareyted (2009)	Double Dare (HeartBeat) (2011)	Naked (2015)

Singles from Double Dare
- 1. "Stroke Me" Released: 7 December 2009; 2. "Don't Let Me Know" Released: 21 October 2010; 3. "The Way You Are" Released: 21 October 2010; 4. "Sisi Eko" Released: 9 December 2010; 5. "Ba Ni Kidi" Released: 9 December 2010; 6. "The Way You Are (Remix)" Released: 19 June 2011

Double Dare (HeartBeat) is the third studio album by Nigerian singer Darey, released on 28 February 2011 by Soul Muzik. It is a double album, with the first disc, Heart, focusing on mid-tempo R&B and highlife songs, and the second disc, Beat, leaning towards up-tempo electronic dance tracks and pop music. Heart has no features, while Beat features guest appearances from Timaya, Mo'Cheddah, Chamillionaire, 9ice, P-Square, Jesse Jagz and Password with production work handled by notable producers such as Del B, eLDee, Wayne McNeish, Don Jazzy, Password and Cobhams Asuquo.

== Singles ==
The album's lead single, "Stroke Me", was released on 7 December 2009 and produced by Don Jazzy and co-produced by Del B and Password. "Don't Let Me Know" and "The Way You Are", were released simultaneously on 21 October 2010 as singles off the album, and were produced by Darey and Cobhams Asuquo. "Sisi Eko" and "Ba Ni Kidi", were also released simultaneously on 9 December 2010 as singles off the album and produced by Cobhams Asuquo and Darey. The seventh single is the remix of "The Way You Are" and features American rapper Chamillionaire. The remix was released on 19 June 2011 in the United Kingdom and produced by Cobhams Asuquo, Del B, and Darey.

== Critical reception ==
Double Dare received generally positive reviews from critics. Ayomide Tayo, writing for The NET praised Double Dare for its creativity and versatility, adding that it "proves that he is the true King of R&B". He described Heart as "an astounding collection of songs that move at an even pace" and Beat as a collection of "dope pop and dance tracks". A writer for 360nobs, going by the pseudonym Jazz, praised the album's lyrical content, as well as Darey's vocal ability and delivery. Rating the project 7.8/10, Jazz concluded, "Darey is without a doubt the 'King of Nigerian R&B'". A reviewer for Jaguda who goes by Taynement, rated Double Dare a 6/10, describing it as "'filler music' where at the moment you enjoy it but you get tired of it quickly".

=== Accolades ===
Awards and nominations for Double Dare
Organization	Year	Category	Result	Ref.
The Headies 2011	2011	Best R&B/Pop Album	Nominated	
2011 Nigeria Entertainment Awards	2011	Best Album of the Year	Nominated	

== Track listing ==
Disc 1 (Heart)
No.	Title	Writer(s)	Producer(s)	Length
1.	"Sisi Eko"	Dare Art Alade; Cobhams Asuquo	Cobhams Asuquo	4:13
2.	"Sweet Mother"	Prince Nico Mbarga	Don Jazzy	3:41
3.	"Stroke Me"	Alade; Keno Kenneth; Michael Ajereh	Don Jazzy; Del B; Password	3:37
4.	"Close"	Alade; Patrick Mathias	Password	4:28
5.	"The Way You Are (Acoustic)"	Alade	Darey	4:20
6.	"Don't Let Me Know"	Alade; Asuquo	Darey; Cobhams Asuquo	4:52
7.	"Never Say Never"	Alade	Cobhams Asuquo	4:31
8.	"Maybe Baby"	Alade	Password	4:20
9.	"Cure The World"	Alade; Mathias	Password	3:56
Total length:				38:02

Disc 2 (Beat)
No.	Title	Writer(s)	Producer(s)	Length
1.	"The Way You Are"	Dare Art Alade; Cobhams Asuquo	Darey; Cobhams Asuquo	3:52
2.	"Provider" (featuring P-Square)	Alade; Peter Okoye; Paul Okoye	Del B	3:55
3.	"Elevate Ya"	Alade	Cobhams Asuquo	3:51
4.	"Turn Me On" (featuring Mo'Cheddah)	Alade; Modupe-Oreoluwa Oyeyemi	Cobhams Asuquo	3:32
5.	"Pillow"	Alade	Cobhams Asuquo	4:04
6.	"Like A Movie"	Alade	Cobhams Asuquo	4:05
7.	"Ba Ni Kidi"	Alade; Asuquo	Darey; Cobhams Asuquo	3:20
8.	"Back To Sender" (featuring Timaya)	Alade; Inetimi Odon	Wayne McNeish	4:20
9.	"The Way You Are (Remix)" (featuring Chamillionaire)	Alade; Asuquo; Hakeem Seriki	Darey; Cobhams Asuquo; Del B	3:52
10.	"Belly"	Alade; Wayne McNeish	Wayne McNeish	3:58

Bonus tracks
No.	Title	Writer(s)	Producer(s)	Length
11.	"Style Na Style (Remix)" (featuring 9ice, Jesse Jagz and Password)	Dare Art Alade; Abolore Akande; Jesse Abaga; Patrick Mathias	Password	4:45
Total length:				43:38

== Personnel ==
- Dare Art Alade – vocals, writing, production, executive production
- Inetimi Timaya Odon – vocals, writing
- Abolore Adegbola Akande – vocals, writing
- Modupe-Oreoluwa Oyeyemi Ola - vocals, writing
- Patrick Mathias – vocals, writing
- Jesse Garba Abaga - vocals, writing
- Paul and Peter Okoye - vocals, writing
- Hakeem Temidayo Seriki - vocals, writing
- Keno Kenneth - writing
- Olanrewaju "eLDee" Dabiri - writing, production
- Cobhams Asuquo – production, writing
- Michael "Don Jazzy" Ajereh - production
- Ayodele Joseph Basil - production
- Tobi Akinbiyi - mixing mastering
- Wayne McNeish - production, mixing
- Osiki Escoffery Ojo - mixing
- TY Bello - photography
- Segun Fasika - graphics
- Deola Art Alade - graphics, executive production, A&R
