= The Way You Are =

The Way You Are may refer to:

- "The Way You Are" (Fältskog and Håkansson song), a 1986 song by Agnetha Fältskog and Ola Håkansson
- "The Way You Are" (Tears for Fears song), a 1983 song by Tears for Fears
- "The Way You Are" (Darey song), a 2010 song by Darey
- "The Way You Are" (Anti Social Media song), a 2015 song by Anti Social Media
- "The Way You Are", a 1995 song by Lighthouse Family from Ocean Drive

== See also ==
- Just the Way You Are (disambiguation)
- The Way I Are
- The Way I Are (Dance with Somebody)
