= Double Dare =

Double Dare may refer to:

== Television ==
- Double Dare (1976 game show), a CBS game show hosted by Alex Trebek, 1976–1977
- Double Dare (franchise), a Nickelodeon game show, 1986–1993, revived in 2000 and 2018
- Double Dare (TV series), starring Billy Dee Williams and Ken Wahl, 1985
- Double Dare (play), a television play by Dennis Potter, 1976

== Other entertainment ==
- Double Dare (Waterparks album), 2016
- Double Dare (Darey album), 2011
- Double Dare (film), a 2004 film by Amanda Micheli
- Double Dare (video game), a based on the game show Double Dare, 1988, 1990
- "Double Dare", a song by rock band Bauhaus from their album In the Flat Field, 1980
- Double Dare (DC Comics), joint name of two henchwomen sisters from DC Comics
- Doubledare, an alias of the Lev Gleason Publications and Image Comics superhero Daredevil
