= Jussoul =

Nigerian soul and Afropop musician

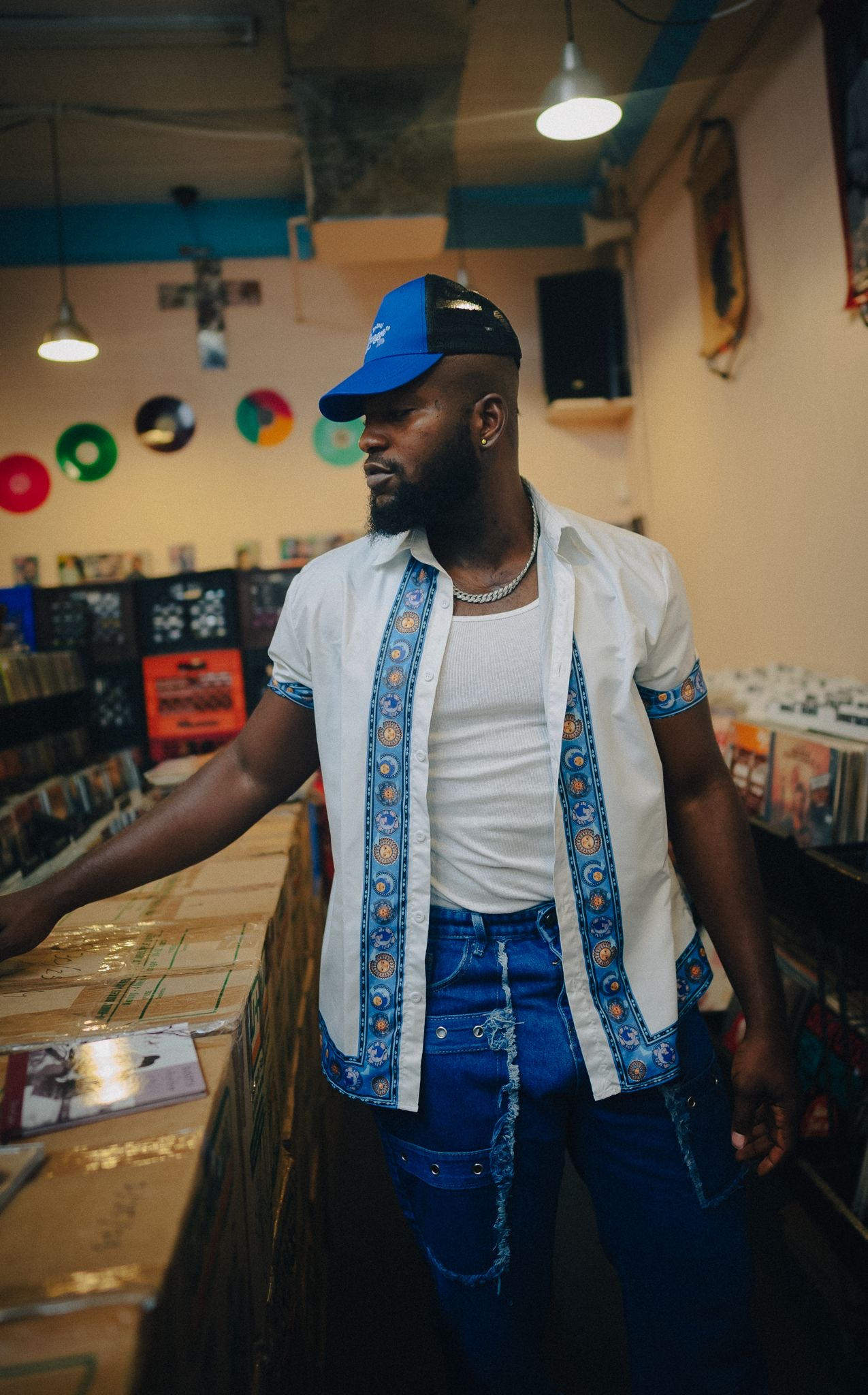

Background information
- Born: Chukwuka John Okafo; Imo State, Nigeria
- Genres: Soul; Pop; R&B
- Occupations: Singer; songwriter; performer
- Instrument: Vocals
- Years active: 2021-present
- Label: StarLink Entertainment

Chukwuka John Okafo, professionally known as Jussoul, formerly as Dr Soul is a United States-based Nigerian soul and Afropop musician.

== Early life and education ==
Music has always been a source of solace for me. As a child, whenever I was upset with my parents, I would go into the corner and write songs.

— GQ

Jussoul was born in Imo State. Jussoul attended his primary school from 1999 to 2005 at Ogba Primary School and Command Day Secondary School for his secondary education graduating in 2011. He was admitted to Avalon University School of Medicine in Curaçao Island but later transferred to a Caribbean Medical University where he graduated in 2020.

== Career ==
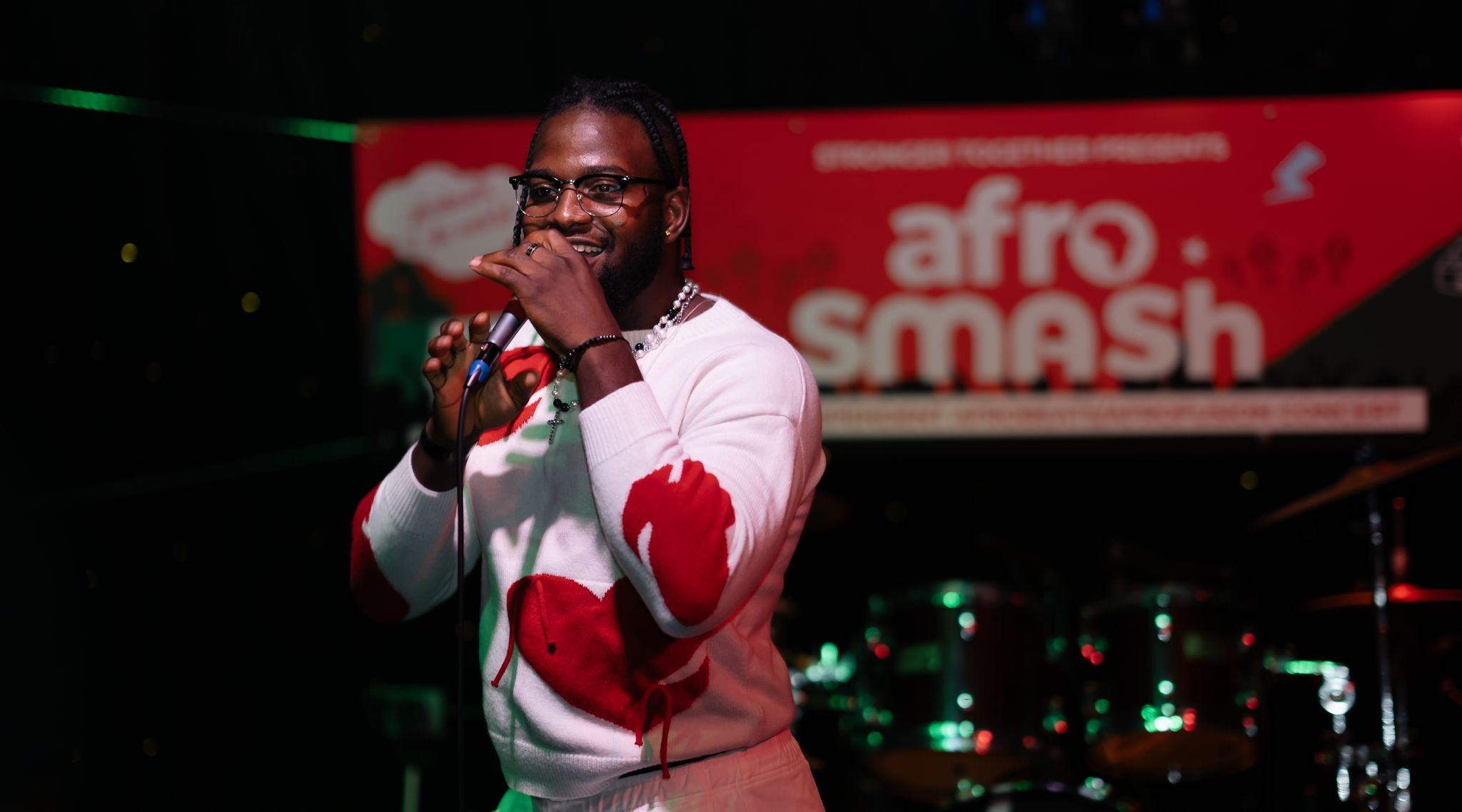
Dr Soul performing in Chicago (2024)

Jussoul whose father was not in support of his musical aspirations began his musical career at age 14 by sneaking out of the house to record studios. In 2021, Jussoul appeared on American Idol rising to the top 40 of 15,000 auditions. Prior his appearance on the American Idol, he released his debut single “Lucid Dreams” that same year. He followed “Lucid Dreams” with “Soul Fire” and “Under The Mistletoe” released in 2022. The following year he released “Hard Love”.

In February 2024, he released "Love in the 90s," a song inspired by a couple he met at the airport who had shared their marital journey which began in the early 90s with him. As of July 2024, “Love in the 90s” has accumulated over 200,000 streams in music streaming services and reached number 1 in Nigeria.

In August, Jussoul released his debut extended play, a 7-track EP that explores themes of pain, healing, and triumph. “Love in the 90s” serves as the lead single from the EP. Afrocritik praises the EP's universal appeal, noting that its relatable themes resonates with a broad audience, making it a compelling listen for many. At concerts, Jussoul has opened for major artists such as P-Square, 9ice, Omah Lay, and Bella Shmurda, among others.

== Style ==
Jussoul sings soul and Afropop. He cites Tiwa Savage, Sam Smith, The Weeknd, Bruno Mars, and Giveon as his inspirations.

== Discography ==
EPs

- The Younger Me (2024)

Singles

- “Lucid Dreams”
- “Soul Fire”
- “Under The Mistletoe”
- “Hard Love”
- “Love in the 90s”
