= Just the Way You Are =

Just the Way You Are may refer to:

== Film and television ==
- Just the Way You Are (1984 film), a 1984 American comedy-drama
- Just the Way You Are (2015 Hallmark TV film), starring Candace Cameron Bure, featuring the Billy Joel song in the soundtrack
- Just the Way You Are (2015 film), a 2015 Filipino teen romantic comedy-drama
- "Just the Way You Are" (She-Ra: Princess of Power), an episode of She-Ra: Princess of Power

== Music ==
=== Albums ===
- Just the Way You Are EP, a 1991 EP by the Goo Goo Dolls, or the title song

=== Songs ===
- "Just the Way You Are" (Billy Joel song), from the 1977 album The Stranger
  - recorded by Barry White on the 1978 Album The Man
- "Just the Way You Are" (Bruno Mars song), 2010, also known as "Just the Way You Are (Amazing)"
- "Just the Way You Are" (Milky song), 2002
- "Just the Way You Are (Drunk at the Bar)", a 2011 song by Brian McFadden
- "Just the Way You Are", 2008 song by Kindred the Family Soul
- "Just the Way You Are", 2011 song by Johnny Gill
- "Just the Way You Are", a song by Kumi Koda from Trick
- "Just the Way You Are", a song by William Shakespeare
- "Just the Way You Are", a song by Ralph Freed

== See also ==
- The Way You Are (disambiguation)
- "The Way I Are", a 2007 song by Timbaland
