= NEC Live =

Nigerian Entertainment Conference

- Status: Active
- Frequency: Annually
- Venue: Landmark Centre, Lagos
- Location: Lagos
- Country: Nigeria
- Years active: 2013 - present
- Established: 2013
- Founders: Adekunle Ayeni
- Previous event: April 24, 2019
- Next event: Pending due to COVID-19 pandemic
- Participants: Nigerian entertainers
- Attendance: Free
- Capacity: 100,000
- Major events: Master Classes, Panel Discussions, Product Exhibition & Live performance
- Organizer: ID Africa
- Website: https://nec.ng/

NEC Live is Nigerian Entertainment Conference (NEC) with a hashtag (#Live) and often written as NECLive. It is an annual deliberative conference of Nigerian entertainers.

NECLive was founded in 2013 by Ayeni Adekunle, a media and PR expert who conceived the idea while waiting to board a flight to London. The annual conference brings together music artists, comedians, Nollywood artists and other stakeholders in the entertainment industry such as producers, marketers, creative arts and media professionals for a full day of conversations, workshops, exhibitions and master classes. The conference encourages establishment of connections and professional relationships between big names in the industry and developing or upcoming talents for mentoring.

The agenda or topics for discussion for each session of NECLive are planned at least three months in advance and announced to the public at preliminary press conferences. NECLive session holds often in the month of April. Participation is free but participants are required to pre-register on a designated portal ahead of the session.

NECLive maiden session held April 26, 2013 at Eko Hotel and Suites in the city of Lagos. Comedian, Tee-A hosted all the seven editions between 2013 and 2019 with about 3000 participants attending annually and millions of audience watching on cable TV and online streaming. In 2019, there were reports that the host, Tee-A had left the program but days before the 7th edition the organizers announced his return to the show. The Current organisers of NECLive are ID Africa, theNETng, African Creative Foundation, MultiChoice, Livespot, Huce Valeris, and Black House Media. Leo DaSilva was one of the speakers of the 2022 event.

== Sessions ==
=== NECLive1 (2013) ===
The maiden edition in 2013 tagged NECLive 1 discussed several topics including, “Building the future of our dream, “Are record labels endangered species?”, “Relationship between corporate Nigeria and entertainment: Parasitism or symbiosis” among other topics. Former Director General of Nigerian Economic Summit Group, Frank Nweke opened the inaugural session. Nollywood actress and broadcaster, Amaka Igwe delivered a speech titled "The Nollywood Paradigm - Reflections From an Unapologetic Commercial Nollywood Filmmaker". Igwe left a classic advise for the Nigerian creative industry: “The industry should use the power and skills inherent to promote and project modern and historical documentation, education and preservation of cultures in Nigeria. The industry has the potential of shaping a positive image for Nigeria. ‘What we are putting out is what the world thinks about Nigeria”. There was a panel session which featured producer, director and actor - Kunle Afolayan, actress- Nse Ekpe Etim, Group Entertainment Editor for The Nation Newspaper - Victor Akande; and President of Actors’ Guild of Nigeria - Ibinabo Fiberesima. Kola Oyeyemi gave a keynote speech titled "Relationship between Corporate Nigeria and Entertainment: Parasitism or Symbiosis". Chris Ubosi spoke on the "Role of the Media in Developing The Industry of Our Dreams".

=== NECLive2 (2014) ===
Lead topics discussed at NECLive2 were “Creating Pathways to the Future”, “Solving The Distribution Problem Once And For All in Nigeria’s Entertainment Industry” “Slaying The Collective Rights Monster”, and “Building A Sustainable Film Industry”. Pat Utomi, a professor of political economy delivered keynote speech at this session. The Panellists at this session were BasketMouth, TuFace - Innocent Idibia, Ramsey Nouah, Uche Jombo, Omotola Jalade-Ekeinde, Gbenga George, Obi Asika, Aina Kusoro, Seyi Taylor, Dr. Sid Esiri. Lara George, a gospel artist gave a quote which reflects the theme of NecLive 2 and underscores piracy activities in the Nigeria entertainment industry: “I spend months in the studio record, you take my music and distribute it whatever way you do and take 80% of the profits. The middle man between will take another 50% from the remaining 20% and leave me with almost nothing. That has to stop, we need a law that will stipulate the percentages these middle men get “.

=== NECLive3 (2015) ===
NecLive 3 theme was "Buying and Selling Nigerian Entertainment…And Everything In Between". Panel discussions focused on topics as "The Future of Music and Fans (The Science of Tracking and Monetizing Airplay)", "How to Sell Nigerian Contents", "Teaching and Training Tomorrow's Talents", 'Finance and Investment Opportunities" and 'Why Image Matters'. Davido and Shizzi worked together to create beats live to demonstrate how they create the hit songs that they release. Panellists at this edition include M.I Abaga, Davido, Segun Arinze, Femi Falodun, DJ Jimmy Jatt, Bez Idakula, Wunmi Obe, Kemi Lala-Akindoju and Nollywood actress Ini Edo and dancer Kaffy were speakers and panellists.

At NecLive 3, the NET Honours honoured a number of prominent Nigerian entertainment personalities including OAP, J.A.J; broadcaster and music critic, Benson Idonije; award-winning music producer, Cobhams Asuquo; media executive, Alex Okosi; Nigeria's National Broadcasting Commission (NBC) Director General, Emeka Mba and respected entertainment writer, Jahman Anikulapo received Net Honours awards. Net Honours is awarded by Nigerian Entertainment Today.

NECLive3 held on April 22, 2015, at Eko Hotel and Suites, Victoria Island, Lagos. This session observed a minute silence in honour of rapper, Dagrin whose death anniversary coincided with the session.

=== NECLive4 (2016) ===
At NecLive 4 discussions centred on how entertainment and creative industry could contribute to the growth of Nigeria economy as an alternative to oil. Nigeria was at the time in its first deep economic recession in decades resulting from low oil prices in the international market, low demand and production cut back at home due to the agitations in the Niger Delta. Nigeria government shifted attention to creative industry that contributes billions of dollars to the economy annually as part of its diversification efforts from oil.

This edition of the conference held on April 20, 2016, themed “Entertainment Industry As ‘Last Hope’ For Africa's Largest Economy”. Lead organiser Ayeni Adekunle had said the speakers at NECLive 4 were selected based on their personal experiences and success stories to prove to the world how entertainment and creative industry could be harnessed to drive a non-oil economy. Panel discussions focused on such topics as “Restructuring the Entertainment Industry as Last Hope”, “Content Marketing: The Power of Music, Comedy and More”, “Embracing Technology in Fashion, Events and Lifestyle”, “Economy of Talents: Using The Entertainment Industry to Rebuild Nigeria” “Making Sense of ‘Nonsense’ in Data and Analytics’ Content is the New Crude” and other topics. The panellists at this edition were Multiple award-winning R&B superstar Banky W, popular musician D’banj, Kaffy, West African Idols winner and singer Timi Dakolo, multi-talented entertainer Falz, Funke Akindele, Femi ‘Falz’ Falana, Julius Agwu singer Simi, Project fame winner, Praiz, and Adekunle Gold Lil’ Kesh TY Bello and several other speakers.

=== NECLive5 (2017) ===
This session of NECLive held on Wednesday, 26 April 2017 at Landmark Center, Lagos. Conversations were on topics such as “How Nigeria’s comedy industry is saving lives and creating jobs”, “Why the rest of the world needs African entertainment”, “How to create entertainment for global audiences - the MTV story”, "How Nollywood is Reclaiming the Market from Hollywood", "Looking Back, To Plot The Future of Music". Speakers at this session include Alibaba Akpobome, Opa Williams, Basketmouth- Bright Okpocha, Daddy Showkey, Iyanya, Teju Babyface, Tonto Dikeh, Seun Okinbaloye, Toyin Abraham.

=== NECLive6 (2018) ===
“Understanding Emerging Markets, Trends and Opportunities” was the theme of NECLive 6 held April 25, 2018. Other topics discussed at this edition include “Entertainment Meets Tech”, “DSTV Now: Building Content for a Digital Generation”, “Understanding New Media and Value Based Services”, “The Science of Events, Promotions and How To Harness The Potentials” and “Opportunities and Prospects in Entertainment and Tech”.

Speakers included Jason Njoku, Lasisi Elenu, Dbanj, Muyiwa Faulkner, Cobhams Asuquo, Obi Asika, Martin Mabutho, Ezegozie Eze, Damien Okorafor, Jide Taiwo, Brymo, Simi, Darey Art Alade, Kelvin Orifa, Colette Otusheso, Sam Oyemelukwe, Ubi Franklin, Richard Nnadi, Bizzle Osikoya, Deji Awokoya, Tochukwu Tagbo, Daddy Freeze, Seun Okinbaloye and Sir Shina Peters.

NET Honours recipients were announced at the conference and the winners were: Moji Olaiya, Ali Nuhu, Vera Sidika, Drake, Basketmouth, Banky W and Adesua Etomi, Big Brother Naija, Toke Makinwa, Simi, Wizkid, Bobrisky, and Odunlade Adekola.

=== NECLive7 (2019) ===
This edition opened with a speech by the convener of NECLive, Ayeni Adekunle titled “A Proposal: Let’s Do Things Differently” in which he underscored the objectives of NECLive. This edition was April 24, 2019. NECLive7 featured a video documentary titled “The Nigerian Entertainment Conference: NECLIVE Through The Years” Shown for the first time at NECLive sessions. Panel discussions focused on “The Business of Numbers and Democratizing Payments”, “Understanding Data for the Purpose of Economic Freedom” and “What the World Must Learn from BBNaija”.

NET Honours announced its 2019 winners selected based on statistics obtained from the Nigerian Entertainment Today's website. The list of winners announced by MTV Base's VJs, Ehiz Okoeguale and Sammy Walsh include: Wizkid, Tiwa Savage, Jim Iyke, Mercy Aigbe, Odunlade Adekola, Mercy Aigbe, Davido and Chioma, Tosyn Bucknor, Ebuka Obi-Uchendu, President Muhammadu Buhari, Alibaba, Juliet Ibrahim, Kim Kardashian, Big Brother Naija and Tobi Bakre.

== NECLive 2.0 ==
Neclive 2.0 is an expanded version of Neclive which makes it a two-day event including multiple satellite events at different venues across Lagos, product exhibition and live performance.
