= The Way You Are (Darey song) =

Single by Darey

from the album Double Dare: Beat
- Released: 21 October 2010
- Studio: SMS (Abuja)
- Genre: R&B; EDM; pop
- Length: 3:52
- Label: Soul Muzik
- Songwriters: Dare Art Alade; Cobhams Asuquo; Ayodele Basil
- Producers: Darey; Cobhams Asuquo

Darey singles chronology
| "Stroke Me" (2009) | "The Way You Are" and "Don't Let Me Know" (2010) | "Sisi Eko" and "Ba Ni Kidi" (2010) |

Music video
- "The Way You Are" on YouTube

"The Way You Are" is a song by Nigerian singer Darey. It was released on 21 October 2010, alongside "Don't Let Me Know", as a single from his double album Double Dare (HeartBeat) (2011), being included on the Beat disc. It was jointly produced by Darey and Cobhams Asuquo, and blends R&B with EDM and pop, under Cobhams' guitar work. The song received positive reviews, with critics praising its upbeat tempo and lounge-style groove. Its music video was directed by Mark Hofmeyr and won Best R&B Video at the 2011 Nigerian Music Video Awards. An official remix featuring American rapper Chamillionaire was later released and marked Darey's debut UK single.

== Reception ==
Upon release, "The Way You Are" received positive reactions from contemporary music critics. Oye Akideinde of 360nobs called it an "upbeat, groovy soulful track with enough BPM that’ll bring folks to the dancefloors," listing the single in their "360Recommends" column. Chiagoziem Onyekwena of Nigerian Entertainment Today said listeners could relate the song's theme of reassurance and described Darey as "vocally energetic", adding that Cobhams' guitar gave the song a soft-rock feel. An unnamed writer for Jaguda said "The Way You Are" had a lounge feel to it, and deemed the single, alongside "Don't Let Me Know", "solid".

== Music video ==
The music video for "The Way You Are" was directed by Mark Hofmeyr and produced by Soul Muzik. The video features women dancing in lingerie and boots. Shot in the United Kingdom, it won Best R&B Video at the 2011 Nigerian Music Video Awards, and received a nomination for Video of the Year at the same event.

== Remix ==
The official remix to "The Way You Are" featuring American rapper Chamillionaire was included as the ninth track off the Beat disc of Darey's double album Double Dare (2011). It was produced by Darey, Cobhams Asuquo, and Del B. According to Ladybrille magazine, the collaboration began on Twitter after Chamillionaire heard the original song and asked to be on a remix. Darey said he agreed and added that he was "still amazed" by the result. On 19 June 2011, it was released on UK radio stations and for digital download on iTunes as his debut single in the United Kingdom. In an interview with Blues & Soul, Darey stated that the song was originally slated to be part of an upcoming self-titled UK album.

=== Reception ===
In a review for The Native magazine, Dennis Ade Peter called the remix "one of the best mergers between Darey and an outside voice". An unnamed writer for Vanguard described the remix as a "funky fusion of Darey’s silky R&B vocals against a hard hitting hip hop and electro beat", saying it is "guaranteed to have listeners humming its catchy hook for hours on end".

== Accolades ==
| Year | Awards ceremony | Award description(s) | Results |
|---|---|---|---|
| 2011 | The Headies | Best R&B Single | Won |
| 2011 | The Headies | Best Vocal Performance (Male) | Nominated |
| 2011 | The Headies | Best Recording of the Year | Won |
| 2011 | Nigerian Music Video Awards | Best R&B Video | Won |
| 2011 | Nigerian Music Video Awards | Video of the Year | Nominated |
