= Lanre da Silva =

Nigerian fashion designer (born 1978)

Lanre da Silva Ajayi
- Born: Lanre da Silva; 1978 (age 47–48); Lagos
- Occupation: Fashion designer
- Known for: Use of metallic fabrics and lace
- Relatives: Leo DaSilva
- Website: lanredasilvaajayi.com

Lanre da Silva (born 1978) is a Nigerian fashion designer based in Lagos. She launched her label in 2005, producing couture, ready-to-wear pieces, jewellery, and hair accessories. Her collections often feature metallic fabrics, lace, and African-inspired patterns, drawing from historical fashion elements such as those of the 1940s and 1800s.

== Early life and education ==
She is of Yoruba origin. After completing secondary education in Nigeria, da Silva moved to the United Kingdom to pursue further studies. She earned an undergraduate degree in business administration from Coventry University and a master's degree in finance from the University of Leicester.

Da Silva is married and has children. She has two siblings. Her father, Sir Leo Babarinde Da Silva, served as Secretary to the Lagos State Government.

== Career ==
In 2011, da Silva presented a collection at New York Fashion Week. Her clothing line has been stocked at Dolce & Gabbana's "Concept Spiga 2" store in Milan. In 2012, she took part in the United Nations "Fashion Development Project", which focuses on fashion industry initiatives in Africa. That same year, her label appeared in an issue of L'Uomo Vogue titled "Re-branding Africa".

In 2012, Vogue Italia ran a feature on da Silva, noting media attention surrounding her work. She was mentioned again in 2014, in connection with her collection being stocked on online fashion retailer Yoox. Her work has been covered by Vogue Black and Arise Magazine.

Her designs have been noted for their use of traditional African textile patterns. In 2017, she produced designs for a lookbook by Vlisco, a textile manufacturer.

In 2014, her "Rock Delight" collection was shown at the "Vogue Talents" fashion event in Milan. The collection referenced visual elements associated with Olumo Rock in Nigeria. Her work has been included in events such as the 2008 Thisday Africa Rising Festival in London, the 2009 Arise Africa Fashion Festival in South Africa, the 2009 New York Couture Fashion Week, and the 2011 Arise Magazine Fashion Week in Lagos.

In 2017, she collaborated with artist Ayoola Gbolahan on a collection that incorporated hand-painted elements. That year, she was nominated for an Eloy Award, an event recognizing female professionals in Nigeria. In 2016, she appeared on the cover of Complete Fashion Magazine.

Da Silva has commented on challenges within the Nigerian fashion industry, including lack of production infrastructure. Lagos has since become a growing centre for fashion in West Africa.
