= Leo DaSilva =

Nigerian reality TV star and pundit (born 1992)

- Born: Leo Babarinde Akinola Dasilva; July 10, 1992 (age 34); Surulere, Lagos, Nigeria
- Education: University of Hertfordshire (B.Eng.)
- Occupations: pundit; reality television star; businessman
- Relatives: Lanre da Silva

Leo Babarinde Akinola Dasilva (born 10 July 1992), is a Nigerian reality television star, businessman and pundit.

== Background and education ==
DaSilva comes from a family of two boys and three girls. He was born in Ojuelegba, Surulere, Lagos; and he is from Lagos Island. His both parents are late.

He had his primary education in Pampers private school, Surulere and his secondary education in Christ the King International School and Rainbow college.

== Career ==
He was a participant in the Big Brother Naija Season 3 in 2018, spending six to seven weeks on the show. In an interview with The Punch, he revealed that he was encouraged to audition for the show by his mother.

He has lent his voice to some of the contemporary issues going on in Nigeria ranging from domestic violence and abusive relationships, to the rising cases of missing persons in Nigeria. Other issues he has spoken about includes being open about one's sexuality with their partners before marriage and the rising number out-of-school children cum beggars on the streets of Lagos. He has also shared his thoughts about several other issues, ranging from the high spate of divorces in the Nigerian entertainment industry, to the indecent way ladies expose their bodies at events, also advising youths to write down their wills when they are as young as 25 years old.

Pivoting into public speaking and pastoring, he was one of the guest speakers at the 2022 NEC Live and at the 2022 Bola Tinubu birthday summit.

== Controversy ==
He drew criticism for participating in the Tinubu birthday summit event from the Nigerian youth. He also suffered criticism from nollywood actress Etinosa Idemudia for focusing his punditry too much on relationship matters.
