= Puffy Tee =

Nigerian singer and producer

Temidayo Babatope Joseph, popularly known by his stage name PuffyTee, is a Nigerian singer-songwriter and record producer. from Ekiti state, Nigeria.

He served as a Judge at the MTN Next Afrobeats Stars initiative, leading two members of his renowned team "Team PuffyTee", Ayo Benzi and Dave Cash to take first place and first runner up respectively. He played a key part in producing the theme song of AIT.

In 2016, he was given a special recognition award by the organisers of the City People Entertainment Awards for his contribution to the growth of entertainment in Nigeria

== Selected production discography ==
- Yahooze – Olu Maintain
- Eleko – Mayorkun
- Lorile – X-Project
- Away – VVIP
- Aiye – 9ice
- Kabiyesi – Funmi Shittu
- Back to Back – Funmi Shittu
- Dominate 2.0 – Kolade Dominate ft. Oritsefemi
