= Ayeni Adekunle =

Nigerian writer and entrepreneur

- Education: University of Ibadan
- Occupations: Entrepreneur, Writer
- Website: ayenithegreat.ng

Ayeni Adekunle is a Nigerian entrepreneur, writer, and published author. He is known for founding Black House Media Group, which is headquartered in Ikeja, Lagos, Nigeria.

== Background and early career ==
Adekunle was born in Ondo State, southwestern Nigeria. He received his primary and secondary education in Lagos, and pursued his university education at the University of Ibadan, Ibadan, Oyo State, where he earned a Bachelor of Science (B.Sc.) degree in Microbiology. Following his graduation, he began his career as a showbiz columnist at Encomium Weekly, having previously served as a feature editor for Hip Hop World Magazine. He later joined ThisDay, and subsequently became a columnist for The Punch in July 2008.

== Entrepreneurship ==
Leaving The Punch, Ayeni Adekunle established Nigeria Entertainment Today (NET), a newspaper and web portal dedicated to reporting entertainment news in Nigeria and Africa. The platform has since evolved into TheNETng. He also convenes the annual Nigeria Entertainment Conference (NEC Live), which brings together professionals from various creative sectors, media, and economic policymakers to discuss industry development.

In 2006, Ayeni founded Black House Media, a company specializing in public relations services. Over time, the company expanded and established subsidiaries including ID Africa, Plaqad, Neusroom, 234Star, NET, Orin, NET Shop, and NEC. In 2012, Ayeni led a team of software and content developers in Nigeria to introduce the BHM App, a public relations app designed for experts in the field.

== Awards and honours ==
Described in Forbes Africa Magazine as a key figure in leading Nigeria into the digital-first strategy era of Marketing Communications, Ayeni Adekunle received the title of Nigeria's PR Practitioner of the Year in 2017. In the same year, the Lagos State chapter of the Nigerian Institute of Public Relations (NIPR) honored his company, Black House Media, with two awards: Agency of the Year and Best Agency to Work For. His other company, ID Africa, received recognition as the Best PR Agency for Use of New Media in 2018. In the same year, BHM won the PR Agency of the Year category at the Brandcom Awards. In 2019, Ayeni Adekunle was honored as a Fellow of the Nigerian Institute of Marketing (NIMN) in recognition of his contributions to the marketing profession.
