= Do You Mind =

Do You Mind may refer to:

- "Do You Mind" (Anthony Newley song), 1960
- "Do You Mind" (Badfinger song), 1973
- "Do You Mind" (DJ Khaled song), 2016
- "Do You Mind" (Kyla song), 2008
- "Do You Mind", a song by Robbie Williams from his 2009 album Reality Killed the Video Star
