= Alapomeji Ancestral Records =

Alapomeji Ancestral
- Founded: 2005
- Status: Active
- Genre: Various
- Country of origin: Nigeria

Ancestor (formerly Alapomeji Ancestral Records, Alapomeji Records) is a Nigerian record label founded in 2008, by 9ice after he left Edge Records. In 2013, it was reported that Alapomeji Records artists which included the likes of Seriki Omo-Owo, Kayefi and Wise had left the label citing lack of support for their actions. In 2015, 9ice re-branded the imprint to Alapomeji Ancestral Records.
