= 9ice =

Nigerian singer, songwriter and dancer (born 1980)

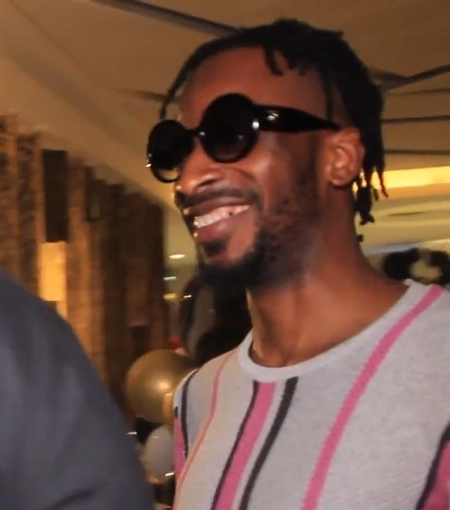

Background information
- Also known as: Adigun; Bashorun Gaa; Alapomeji; Ancestor; Baale
- Born: Abolore Adegbola Akande; 17 January 1980 (age 46)
- Origin: Ogbomosho, Oyo State, Nigeria
- Genres: Hip-hop; Afrobeats; Fuji music
- Occupations: Singer; songwriter; dancer
- Years active: 2000–present
- Label: Alapomeji Ancestral Records

Akande Abolore Adegbola Alexander Ajifolajifaola (born Abolore Adegbola Akande; 17 January 1980) better known as 9ice (pronounced nice), is a Nigerian singer, songwriter and dancer. He is known for his use of the Yoruba language in his music, and for his proverbial lyrics and unique style of delivery.

== Early life ==
Abolore Adegbola Akande was born into a polygamous home of five wives and nine children in Ogbomosho, Oyo State, in Western Nigeria. He grew up in the Shomolu Bariga suburbs of Lagos. Growing up, he dreamed of becoming a musician. His parents discovered his singing talent, and allowed him become a musician.

== Career ==
In 1996, 9ice recorded his first demo, titled "Risi de Alagbaja", but it was not until 2000 that he released his first official solo song, titled "Little Money".

In 2008, 9ice released the single "Gongo Aso". With the song gaining popularity, 9ice was asked to perform at the Nelson Mandela 90th Birthday Tribute concert in London in June 2008. He went on to win the Best Hip Hop Artist of the Year at the MTV Africa Music Awards.

"Gongo Aso" won him four further awards at the 2009 edition of the Hip Hop World Awards, held at the International Conference Centre, Abuja: Album of the Year, Artiste of the Year, Song of the Year and Best Rap in Pop Album.

In 2020, 9ice released another album, titled Tip of the Iceberg: Episode 1.

After a short hiatus from the music scene, 9ice released the second episode of his album, Tip of the Iceberg: Episode II.

9ice is the founder and CEO of Alapomeji Entertainment Limited and the record label Alapomeji Ancestral Record, which is managed by Saliman Badmus DEJI.

== Discography ==
Studio albums

- Certificate (2007)
- Gongo Aso (2008)
- Tradition (2009)
- Bashorun Gaa (2011)
- Versus (2011)
- C.N.N (2014)
- G.R.A (2014)
- Id Cabasa (2017)
- Tip of the Iceberg: Episode 1 (2020)
- Fear of God (2020)
- G.O.A.T (2021)
- Tip of the Iceberg II (2022)
- Afro Juju (2022)
- Election Time (2022)
- Tip of the Iceberg III (2023)
- Lord of Ajasa (2023)
- Observatory (2024)
- Beginning of Wisdom (2025)

== Awards ==
- Nigeria Entertainment Awards Most Indigenous Act 2007
- MOBO Best African Act 2008
- MTV Africa Music Awards Best Hip Hop Artist 2008
- Dynamix Awards Artist of the Year 2008
- Hip Hop Awards Best Vocal Performance 2008
- Hip Awards Revelation of the Year 2008
- Hip Hop Awards Song of the Year 2009
- Hip Hop Awards Best R&B/Pop 2009
- Hip Hop Awards Album of the Year 2009
- The Headies Award for Hip Hop Awards Artist of the Year 2009.

== See also ==
- List of Nigerian musicians
