= The Netng =

Online entertainment news organisation

Nigerian Entertainment Today
- Type: Online publication
- Owner: ID Africa
- Founder: Adekunle Ayeni
- Publisher: ID Africa
- Founded: November 23, 2009
- Headquarters: Lagos, Nigeria
- Sister newspapers: 23Star, Neusroom, Orin
- Website: https://thenet.ng/

Nigerian Entertainment Today, also known as NET or The Netng, is an online entertainment news organisation based in Lagos, Nigeria. It is a source of African entertainment, fashion and lifestyle news. Netng formed part of NET Newspaper Limited (NNL) until 2019 when it was acquired by ID Africa. Netng is the organiser of NECLive (Nigerian Entertainment Conference) and the NET Honours.

== History ==
Nigerian Entertainment Today (NET) was established on November 23, 2009, by Ayeni Adekunle. NET also ran as a print media and its printed copies circulated in about 37 major Nigerian cities and sold 10,000 copies weekly. In 2016, NET gradually phased out its print version as many of its readers moved online in search of entertainment news. In April 2013, a website ranking organisation, Alexa ranked Netng 33rd most visited website in Nigeria. Days after the ranking was announced, NET website (www.thenetng.com) came under a sustained hackers attack believed to be from certain Rocco Mancini who took total control of the site and made it inaccessible to visitors. The hackers initially demanded a ransom of $1,200. Later this amount was reduced but the publisher refused to pay any ransom to the hackers preferring to launch a new domain (www.thenet.ng). By 2014, the new website was ranked among 100 top websites in Nigeria by Alexa. The NET Newspaper Limited (NNL) and all its subsidiaries including Netng was acquired in 2019 by ID Africa. The acquisition ceded total ownership rights to ID Africa.

== Reportage ==
Netng is known for breaking and reporting exclusive entertainment news. For instance, Netng was first to break the news of the birth of Wizkid and Ice Prince's kids. In 2012, Netng reported an exclusive interview granted it by D'Banj in London providing a comprehensive insight into what led to the break up of Don Jazzy and D'banj (co-founders of Mo' Hits Records). This exclusive report laid to rest speculations about the cause of their breakup.

The maiden print edition of the Netng broke the news of the death of a Nigerian rapper, Da Grin with a special tribute. Printed copies of the paper sold out within weeks of its first emergence in news stands across 37 major cities in Nigeria.
