= Nicki Minaj discography =

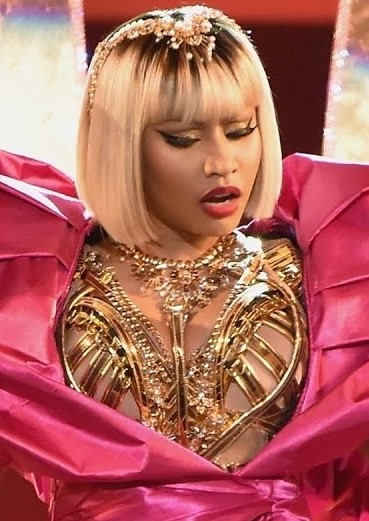
- Minaj performing in 2018
- Studio albums: 5
- Compilation albums: 1
- Singles: 136
- Reissues: 1
- Mixtapes: 3
- Promotional singles: 20

Trinidadian rapper Nicki Minaj has released five studio albums, one compilation album, three mixtapes, 136 singles (including 84 as a featured artist), and 20 promotional singles. After becoming involved with dancing, music and acting in high school in New York City, she eventually pursued her passion for rapping. Minaj was discovered by American rapper Lil Wayne and signed to Young Money Entertainment—a subdivision of Cash Money Records with distribution through Republic Records—in 2009. Her first solo single, "Your Love", peaked at number 14 on the US Billboard Hot 100 and topped the Billboard Hot Rap Songs chart, an achievement that made Minaj the first female artist to top the chart as a solo artist since 2002. Minaj's next three singles, "Check It Out", "Right Thru Me" and "Moment 4 Life", all peaked within the top 40 on the Hot 100. Her debut studio album, Pink Friday, was released in November 2010, topping the US Billboard 200 and has since been certified triple platinum by the Recording Industry Association of America (RIAA). The album's fifth single, "Super Bass", reached the top ten in multiple countries, including the US where it peaked at number three and has since been certified twelve platinum by the RIAA for selling over 12 million units in the country.

Her second studio album, Pink Friday: Roman Reloaded (2012), debuted at number one on the Billboard 200. The album also entered the UK Albums Chart at number one, making Minaj the highest-charting female rapper on the UK charts. The album's lead single, "Starships", peaked at number five on the Hot 100 and reached the top ten in multiple other countries. An expanded version of Pink Friday: Roman Reloaded subtitled, The Re-Up, was released in November 2012. Minaj's third studio album, The Pinkprint (2014), debuted at number two on the Billboard 200. The album's second single, "Anaconda", peaked at number two on the Hot 100 while further singles, "Only" and "Truffle Butter", peaked within the top 20 on the chart. In 2014, Minaj shared lead credit on the single "Bang Bang" with Jessie J and Ariana Grande. The song scored Minaj her first number one in the UK and peaked at number three in the US. Minaj's fourth studio album, Queen (2018), debuted at number two on the Billboard 200 and was certified platinum by the RIAA.

In 2020, Minaj scored her first number-one single on the Hot 100 after featuring on the remix of Doja Cat's "Say So"; marking the first collaboration between two female rap artists to top the chart. That same year, her collaboration with 6ix9ine on the song "Trollz" debuted at number one on the Hot 100; making Minaj the second female rapper to debut atop the Hot 100, and earning Minaj her first number-one single as a lead artist. Minaj's single "Super Freaky Girl" from her fifth studio album Pink Friday 2 (2023) debuted at number one on the Hot 100, becoming the second solo song by a female rap artist to do so since Lauryn Hill in 1998, and earning Minaj her third overall number-one single in the US.

Since 2010, Minaj has accumulated 147 chart entries on the Hot 100 (including featured credits) and has scored 23 top ten singles in her career, giving her the most among female rappers. Minaj has sold over 100 million records worldwide, making her the best-selling female rapper of all time. She was ranked by Billboard as the seventh overall Top Female Artist of any genre for the 2010s decade. According to the RIAA, Minaj has 38 million certified units for her own singles in the US.

== Albums ==
=== Studio albums ===
List of studio albums
Title	Album details	Peak chart positions										Sales	Certifications
Title	Album details	US	US R&B/ HH	US Rap	AUS	CAN	FRA	IRL	NZ	SWE	UK	Sales	Certifications
Pink Friday	Released: November 22, 2010; Label: Young Money, Cash Money, Universal Motown; Formats: CD, LP, digital download, streaming	1	1	1	19	8	116	17	15	—	16	US: 2,000,000; UK: 282,000	RIAA: 3× Platinum; ARIA: Platinum; BPI: Platinum; RMNZ: 2× Platinum
Pink Friday: Roman Reloaded	Released: April 2, 2012; Label: Young Money, Cash Money, Universal Republic; Formats: CD, LP, digital download, streaming	1	1	1	5	1	20	2	3	37	1	US: 905,000; UK: 242,000	RIAA: 4× Platinum; BPI: Platinum; GLF: Gold; IRMA: Platinum
The Pinkprint	Released: December 12, 2014; Label: Young Money, Cash Money, Republic; Formats: CD, LP, digital download, streaming	2	1	1	19	6	70	31	21	9	22	US: 682,000	RIAA: 2× Platinum; ARIA: Platinum; BPI: Platinum; GLF: Gold; MC: 2× Platinum; RMNZ: 2× Platinum
Queen	Released: August 10, 2018; Label: Young Money, Cash Money, Republic; Formats: CD, LP, digital download, streaming	2	2	2	4	2	7	5	8	15	5	US: 147,000	RIAA: Platinum; ARIA: Gold; BPI: Gold; MC: 2× Platinum; RMNZ: Gold; SNEP: Gold
Pink Friday 2	Released: December 8, 2023; Label: Republic; Formats: CD, LP, digital download, streaming	1	1	1	3	2	20	9	3	32	3	US: 92,000	RIAA: Platinum; BPI: Gold; RMNZ: Gold
"—" denotes a recording that did not chart or was not released in that territory.

=== Reissued albums ===
List of reissues
Title	Album details	Certifications
Pink Friday: Roman Reloaded – The Re-Up	Released: November 19, 2012; Label: Young Money, Cash Money, Universal Republic; Formats: CD, DVD, digital download, streaming	ARIA: Platinum; RMNZ: Platinum

=== Compilation albums ===
List of compilation albums
Title	Album details	Peak chart positions								Certifications
Title	Album details	US	US R&B/ HH	US Rap	AUS	CAN	IRL	NZ	UK	Certifications
Queen Radio: Volume 1	Released: August 26, 2022; Label: Young Money, Republic; Formats: CD, LP, digital download, streaming	10	6	4	50	8	88	12	67	BPI: Platinum; RMNZ: 2× Platinum

=== Mixtapes ===
List of mixtapes, with selected chart positions
Title	Album details	Peak chart positions						
Title	Album details	US	US R&B/ HH	US Rap	AUS	CAN	NZ	UK
Playtime Is Over	Released: July 5, 2007; Label: Dirty Money Entertainment; Formats: CD, digital download	—	—	—	—	—	—	—
Sucka Free	Released: April 12, 2008; Label: Young Money, Dirty Money; Formats: CD, digital download	—	95	—	—	—	—	—
Beam Me Up Scotty	Released: April 18, 2009; Re-released: May 14, 2021; Label: Young Money; Formats: CD, digital download, streaming (Note: Using the 2021 reissue.), LP	2	2	2	41	5	32	19
"—" denotes a recording that did not chart or was not released in that territory.

== Singles ==
=== As lead artist ===
List of singles
Title	Year	Peak chart positions										Certifications	Album
Title	Year	US	US R&B/ HH	US Rap	AUS	CAN	FRA	IRL	NZ	SWE	UK	Certifications	Album
"Introlude - Props"	2006	—	—	—	—	—	—	—	—	—	—		data-sort-value="" style="background: var(--background-color-interactive, #ececec); color: var(--color-base, inherit); vertical-align: middle; text-align: center; " class="table-na" | Non-album singles
"Massive Attack" (featuring Sean Garrett)	2010	— (Note: "Massive Attack" did not enter the Billboard Hot 100, but peaked at number 22 on the Bubbling Under Hot 100 Singles chart.)	65	—	—	—	—	—	—	—	—		data-sort-value="" style="background: var(--background-color-interactive, #ececec); color: var(--color-base, inherit); vertical-align: middle; text-align: center; " class="table-na" | Non-album singles
"Your Love"	2010	14	4	1	—	43	—	—	—	—	71	RIAA: Platinum; ARIA: Platinum; BPI: Silver; RMNZ: Platinum	Pink Friday
"Check It Out" (with will.i.am)	2010	24	100	14	21	14	—	14	—	—	11	BPI: Silver	Pink Friday
"Right Thru Me"	2010	26	4	3	—	60	—	—	—	—	71	RIAA: Gold	Pink Friday
"Moment 4 Life" (featuring Drake)	2010	13	1	1	—	27	65	37	—	—	22	RIAA: Platinum; ARIA: 2× Platinum; BPI: Platinum; RMNZ: 2× Platinum	Pink Friday
"Super Bass"	2011	3	6	2	6	6	—	17	3	43	8	RIAA: 12× Platinum; ARIA: 11× Platinum; BPI: 3× Platinum; RMNZ: 5× Platinum	Pink Friday
"Did It On'em"	2011	49	3	4	—	—	—	—	—	—	—	RIAA: Gold; ARIA: Gold; RMNZ: Gold	Pink Friday
"Girls Fall Like Dominoes"	2011	—	—	—	99	—	—	28	13	—	24		Pink Friday
"Fly" (featuring Rihanna)	2011	19	20	9	18	55	—	14	13	—	16	RIAA: Platinum; ARIA: 2× Platinum; BPI: Gold; RMNZ: Platinum	Pink Friday
"Starships"	2012	5	85	10	2	4	5	2	2	3	2	RIAA: Diamond; ARIA: 12× Platinum; BPI: 4× Platinum; GLF: 3× Platinum; RMNZ: 5× Platinum	Pink Friday: Roman Reloaded
"Right by My Side" (featuring Chris Brown)	2012	51	21	—	—	—	122	—	—	—	70	RIAA: 2× Platinum; ARIA: Platinum; BPI: Silver; RMNZ: Gold	Pink Friday: Roman Reloaded
"Beez in the Trap" (featuring 2 Chainz)	2012	48	7	7	—	—	—	74	—	—	131	RIAA: 3× Platinum; ARIA: Gold; BPI: Silver; RMNZ: Gold	Pink Friday: Roman Reloaded
"Pound the Alarm"	2012	15	— (Note: "Pound the Alarm" did not enter the Hot R&B/Hip-Hop Songs chart, but peaked at number 18 on the Bubbling Under R&B/Hip-Hop Singles chart.)	—	10	8	19	8	6	33	8	RIAA: 2× Platinum; ARIA: 3× Platinum; BPI: Platinum; RMNZ: Gold	Pink Friday: Roman Reloaded
"The Boys" (with Cassie)	2012	— (Note: "The Boys" did not enter the Billboard Hot 100, but peaked at number 14 on the Bubbling Under Hot 100 Singles chart.)	41	—	—	—	—	95	—	—	101		Pink Friday: Roman Reloaded – The Re-Up
"Automatic"	2012	—	—	—	—	—	102	—	—	—	199		Pink Friday: Roman Reloaded
"Va Va Voom"	2012	22	—	—	36	18	54	13	20	—	20	RIAA: 2× Platinum; ARIA: 2× Platinum; BPI: Platinum; RMNZ: Platinum	Pink Friday: Roman Reloaded
"Freedom"	2012	— (Note: "Freedom" did not enter the Billboard Hot 100, but peaked at number four on the Bubbling Under Hot 100 Singles chart.)	31	23	—	—	—	—	—	—	107		Pink Friday: Roman Reloaded – The Re-Up
"High School" (featuring Lil Wayne)	2013	64	20	15	57	81	91	47	—	—	31	RIAA: 2× Platinum; ARIA: Platinum; BPI: Gold; RMNZ: Platinum	Pink Friday: Roman Reloaded – The Re-Up
"Pills n Potions"	2014	24	7	2	14	53	71	29	17	—	31	ARIA: 2× Platinum; BPI: Gold; RMNZ: Platinum	The Pinkprint
"Bang Bang" (with Jessie J and Ariana Grande)	2014	3	—	—	4	3	47	3	4	15	1	RIAA: Diamond; ARIA: 5× Platinum; BPI: 4× Platinum; GLF: 4× Platinum; MC: 6× Platinum; RMNZ: 5× Platinum	Sweet Talker and My Everything
"Anaconda"	2014	2	1	1	8	3	38	10	9	30	3	RIAA: 2× Platinum; ARIA: 4× Platinum; BPI: Platinum; GLF: Gold; RMNZ: Platinum	The Pinkprint
"Only" (featuring Drake, Lil Wayne, and Chris Brown)	2014	12	1	1	62	20	102	—	—	—	35	RIAA: 3× Platinum; ARIA: 3× Platinum; BPI: Platinum; RMNZ: 2× Platinum	The Pinkprint
"Bed of Lies" (featuring Skylar Grey)	2014	62	19	13	7	41	134	56	13	11	73	ARIA: 2× Platinum; GLF: 2× Platinum; RMNZ: Platinum	The Pinkprint
"Truffle Butter" (featuring Drake and Lil Wayne)	2015	14	4	2	—	43	—	—	—	—	188	ARIA: Platinum; BPI: Gold; RMNZ: Platinum	The Pinkprint
"The Night Is Still Young"	2015	31	—	6	—	40	—	98	—	93	—	RIAA: Platinum; ARIA: Platinum; BPI: Gold; GLF: Gold; RMNZ: Platinum	The Pinkprint
"Make Love" (with Gucci Mane)	2017	78	33	22	—	—	—	—	—	—	—	RIAA: Gold	Mr. Davis
"Changed It" (with Lil Wayne)	2017	71	29	18	—	—	—	—	—	—	—		Non-album singles
"No Frauds" (with Drake and Lil Wayne)	2017	14	8	5	58	25	148	71	— (Note: "No Frauds" did not enter the NZ Top 40 Singles Chart, but peaked at number three on the NZ Heatseeker Singles Chart.)	94	49	ARIA: Platinum; BPI: Silver; MC: Gold; RMNZ: Gold	Non-album singles
"Regret in Your Tears"	2017	61	26	—	—	84	—	—	—	—	69		Non-album singles
"MotorSport" (with Migos and Cardi B)	2017	6	3	3	74	12	123	79	— (Note: "MotorSport" did not enter the NZ Top 40 Singles Chart, but peaked at number two on the NZ Heatseeker Singles Chart.)	— (Note: "MotorSport" did not enter the Sverigetopplistan Top 100 Singles chart, but peaked at number four on the Sverigetopplistan Heatseekers chart.)	49	RIAA: 6× Platinum; ARIA: Platinum; BPI: Platinum; MC: 3× Platinum; RMNZ: Platinum; SNEP: Gold	Culture II
"Barbie Tingz"	2018	25	17	13	41	21	—	58	— (Note: "Barbie Tingz" did not enter the NZ Top 40 Singles Chart, but peaked at number one on the NZ Heatseeker Singles Chart.)	90	31	RIAA: Gold; ARIA: Platinum; BPI: Silver; RMNZ: Gold	Queen
"Chun-Li"	2018	10	7	6	54	18	—	65	— (Note: "Chun-Li" did not enter the NZ Top 40 Singles Chart, but peaked at number two on the NZ Heatseeker Singles Chart.)	— (Note: "Chun-Li" did not enter the Swedish Singellista Chart, but peaked at number nine on the Swedish Heatseeker Chart.)	26	RIAA: Platinum; ARIA: 2× Platinum; BPI: Gold; MC: Gold; RMNZ: Platinum	Queen
"Bed" (featuring Ariana Grande)	2018	42	19	17	17	30	105	22	25	44	20	RIAA: Gold; ARIA: Platinum; BPI: Gold; MC: Platinum; RMNZ: Platinum	Queen
"Barbie Dreams"	2018	18	13	11	57	43	—	41	— (Note: "Barbie Dreams" did not enter the NZ Top 40 Singles Chart, but peaked at number three on the NZ Hot Singles Chart.)	— (Note: "Barbie Dreams" did not enter the Swedish Singellista Chart, but peaked at number seven on the Swedish Heatseeker Chart.)	36	RIAA: Gold; ARIA: Platinum; BPI: Silver; RMNZ: Platinum	Queen
"Good Form" (solo or featuring Lil Wayne)	2018	60	29	—	—	46	—	96	— (Note: "Good Form" did not enter the NZ Top 40 Singles Chart, but peaked at number 28 on the NZ Hot Singles Chart.)	—	—	ARIA: Platinum; BPI: Silver; RMNZ: Gold	Queen
"Megatron"	2019	20	11	9	89	25	—	56	— (Note: "Megatron" did not enter the NZ Top 40 Singles Chart, but peaked at number 10 on the NZ Hot Singles Chart.)	—	34	RIAA: Platinum; ARIA: Gold; BPI: Silver; MC: Gold; RMNZ: Gold	Non-album single
"Tusa" (with Karol G)	2019	42	—	—	—	98	6	—	—	— (Note: "Tusa" did not enter the Swedish Singellista Chart, but peaked at number six on the Swedish Heatseeker Chart.)	—	RIAA: 41× Platinum (Latin); BPI: Silver; MC: 2× Platinum; RMNZ: Gold; SNEP: Diamond	KG0516
"Trollz" (with 6ix9ine)	2020	1	1	1	45	4	45	12	— (Note: "Trollz" did not enter the NZ Top 40 Singles Chart, but peaked at number 3 on the NZ Hot Singles Chart.)	51	12	RIAA: Platinum	TattleTales
"What That Speed Bout!?" (with Mike Will Made It and YoungBoy Never Broke Again)	2020	35	11	10	—	76	—	—	—	—	—		Michael
"Do We Have a Problem?" (with Lil Baby)	2022	2	1	1	64	14	193	48	— (Note: "Do We Have a Problem?" did not enter the NZ Top 40 Singles Chart, but peaked at number six on the NZ Hot Singles Chart.)	—	31	RIAA: Gold	Queen Radio: Volume 1
"Bussin" (with Lil Baby)	2022	20	5	4	—	40	—	89	— (Note: "Bussin" did not enter the NZ Top 40 Singles Chart, but peaked at number nine on the NZ Hot Singles Chart.)	—	70		Queen Radio: Volume 1
"Blick Blick" (with Coi Leray)	2022	37	10	8	—	68	—	—	— (Note: "Blick Blick" did not enter the NZ Top 40 Singles Chart, but peaked at number 10 on the NZ Hot Singles Chart.)	—	—	RIAA: Gold	Trendsetter
"We Go Up" (featuring Fivio Foreign)	2022	58	15	11	—	—	—	—	—	—	—		Queen Radio: Volume 1
"Super Freaky Girl"	2022	1	1	1	1	8	—	6	1	28	5	RIAA: 2× Platinum; ARIA: 4× Platinum; BPI: Platinum; RMNZ: 2× Platinum	Pink Friday 2
"Love in the Way" (with Yung Bleu)	2022	93	25	—	—	—	—	—	— (Note: "Love in the Way" did not enter the NZ Top 40 Singles Chart, but peaked at number 24 on the NZ Hot Singles Chart.)	—	—		Tantra
"Tukoh Taka" (with Maluma and Myriam Fares)	2022	—	—	—	—	—	—	—	— (Note: "Tukoh Taka" did not enter the NZ Top 40 Singles Chart, but peaked at number 15 on the NZ Hot Singles Chart.)	—	—		FIFA World Cup Qatar 2022 Official Soundtrack
"Princess Diana" (with Ice Spice)	2023	4	2	1	—	21	158	—	31	—	—	RIAA: Platinum; BPI: Silver; MC: Platinum; RMNZ: Gold	Like..?
"Red Ruby da Sleeze"	2023	13	4	1	—	46	—	28	— (Note: "Red Ruby da Sleeze" did not enter the NZ Top 40 Singles Chart, but peaked at number five on the NZ Hot Singles Chart.)	—	28	RIAA: Platinum; ARIA: Gold; BPI: Silver	Pink Friday 2
"Alone" (with Kim Petras)	2023	55	—	—	—	72	—	35	— (Note: "Alone" did not enter the NZ Top 40 Singles Chart, but peaked at number four on the NZ Hot Singles Chart.)	— (Note: "Alone" did not enter the Swedish Singellista Chart, but peaked at number 17 on the Swedish Heatseeker Chart.)	37	MC: Gold	Feed the Beast
"Barbie World" (with Ice Spice and Aqua)	2023	7	2	2	3	7	16	6	3	9	4	ARIA: Platinum; BPI: Gold; MC: Platinum; RMNZ: Platinum; SNEP: Gold	Barbie the Album
"Last Time I Saw You"	2023	23	6	—	—	48	—	67	— (Note: "Last Time I Saw You" did not enter the NZ Top 40 Singles Chart, but peaked at number three on the NZ Hot Singles Chart.)	—	46		Pink Friday 2
"Everybody" (featuring Lil Uzi Vert)	2024	24	5	3	—	46	—	30	— (Note: "Everybody" did not enter the NZ Top 40 Singles Chart, but peaked at number four on the NZ Hot Singles Chart.)	—	26	RMNZ: Gold	Pink Friday 2
"FTCU"	2024	15	6	5	58	23	—	44	26	—	40	RIAA: Platinum; RMNZ: Gold	Pink Friday 2
"Big Foot"	2024	23	10	8	—	62	—	—	— (Note: "Big Foot" did not enter the NZ Top 40 Singles Chart, but peaked at number 11 on the NZ Hot Singles Chart.)	—	56		Non-album single
"AGATS2 (Insecure)" (with Juice Wrld)	2024	68	16	11	—	100	—	—	— (Note: "AGATS2 (Insecure)" did not enter the NZ Top 40 Singles Chart, but peaked at number 15 on the NZ Hot Singles Chart.)	—	89		The Party Never Ends
"—" denotes a recording that did not chart or was not released in that territory.

=== As featured artist ===
List of singles as featured artist
Title	Year	Peak chart positions										Certifications	Album
Title	Year	US	US R&B/ HH	US Rap	AUS	CAN	FRA	IRL	NZ	SWE	UK	Certifications	Album
"Lollipop Luxury" (Jeffree Star featuring Nicki Minaj)	2009	—	—	—	—	—	—	—	—	—	—		Beauty Killer
"Up Out My Face" (Mariah Carey featuring Nicki Minaj)	2010	100	39	—	—	—	—	—	—	—	—		Memoirs of an Imperfect Angel
"Knockout" (Lil Wayne featuring Nicki Minaj)	2010	44	—	—	—	—	—	—	—	—	—	RIAA: Platinum	Rebirth
"My Chick Bad" (Ludacris featuring Nicki Minaj)	2010	11	2	2	—	—	—	—	—	—	—	RIAA: 3× Platinum; RMNZ: Gold	Battle of the Sexes
"Lil Freak" (Usher featuring Nicki Minaj)	2010	40	8	—	—	—	—	—	—	—	109	RIAA: Platinum	Raymond v. Raymond
"Get It All" (Sean Garrett featuring Nicki Minaj)	2010	—	83	—	—	—	—	—	—	—	—		The Inkwell
"Woohoo" (Christina Aguilera featuring Nicki Minaj)	2010	79	—	—	—	46	—	—	—	—	148		Bionic
"Bottoms Up" (Trey Songz featuring Nicki Minaj)	2010	6	2	—	74	34	—	—	—	—	71	RIAA: 4× Platinum; BPI: Silver; RMNZ: Platinum	Passion, Pain & Pleasure
"2012 (It Ain't the End)" (Jay Sean featuring Nicki Minaj)	2010	31	—	—	40	23	—	44	9	—	9	RIAA: Gold; BPI: Silver; RMNZ: Gold	Hit the Lights
"Letting Go (Dutty Love)" (Sean Kingston featuring Nicki Minaj)	2010	36	51	—	73	35	—	—	23	—	—	RIAA: Platinum; RMNZ: Platinum	Non-album single
"Monster" (Kanye West featuring Jay-Z, Rick Ross, Bon Iver, and Nicki Minaj)	2010	18	30	15	91	43	—	—	—	—	146	RIAA: 3× Platinum; BPI: Platinum; RMNZ: Platinum	My Beautiful Dark Twisted Fantasy
"I Ain't Thru" (Keyshia Cole featuring Nicki Minaj)	2010	— (Note: "I Ain't Thru" did not enter the Billboard Hot 100, but peaked at number 19 on the Bubbling Under Hot 100 Singles chart.)	54	—	—	—	—	—	—	—	—		Calling All Hearts
"Raining Men" (Rihanna featuring Nicki Minaj)	2010	— (Note: "Raining Men" did not enter the Billboard Hot 100, but peaked at number 11 on the Bubbling Under Hot 100 Singles chart.)	48	—	—	—	—	—	—	—	142		Loud
"The Creep" (The Lonely Island featuring Nicki Minaj)	2011	82	—	—	—	90	—	—	—	—	—		Turtleneck & Chain
"Where Them Girls At" (David Guetta featuring Flo Rida and Nicki Minaj)	2011	14	—	24	6	3	4	5	6	7	3	RIAA: Platinum; ARIA: 2× Platinum; BPI: 2× Platinum; GLF: Gold; RMNZ: 2× Platinum	Nothing but the Beat
"Y.U. Mad" (Birdman featuring Nicki Minaj and Lil Wayne)	2011	68	46	25	—	—	—	—	—	—	—		Non-album singles
"You the Boss" (Rick Ross featuring Nicki Minaj)	2011	62	5	10	—	—	—	—	—	—	—	RIAA: Gold	Non-album singles
"Fireball" (Willow featuring Nicki Minaj)	2011	—	— (Note: "Fireball" did not enter the Hot R&B/Hip-Hop Songs chart, but peaked at number 21 on the Bubbling Under R&B/Hip-Hop Singles chart.)	—	—	—	—	—	—	—	—		Non-album singles
"Make Me Proud" (Drake featuring Nicki Minaj)	2011	9	1	1	95	25	—	—	—	—	49	RIAA: Platinum; ARIA: Platinum; BPI: Gold; RMNZ: Gold	Take Care
"Dance (A$$) (Remix)" (Big Sean featuring Nicki Minaj)	2011	10	3	2	—	69	—	—	—	—	—	RIAA: 5× Platinum; RMNZ: Gold	Finally Famous
"Turn Me On" (David Guetta featuring Nicki Minaj)	2011	4	92	—	3	3	10	4	2	29	8	RIAA: 2× Platinum; ARIA: 3× Platinum; BPI: Platinum; MC: 3× Platinum; RMNZ: Platinum	Nothing but the Beat and Pink Friday: Roman Reloaded
"Give Me All Your Luvin'" (Madonna featuring Nicki Minaj and M.I.A.)	2012	10	—	—	25	1	3	11	29	60	37	RIAA: Gold	MDNA
"Take It to the Head" (DJ Khaled featuring Chris Brown, Rick Ross, Nicki Minaj, and Lil Wayne)	2012	58	6	6	—	—	—	—	—	—	102	RIAA: Platinum	Kiss the Ring
"Get Low" (Waka Flocka Flame featuring Nicki Minaj, Tyga, and Flo Rida)	2012	72	67	22	—	58	—	—	—	—	—		Triple F Life: Friends, Fans & Family
"Girl on Fire (Inferno Version)" (Alicia Keys featuring Nicki Minaj)	2012	11	2	—	12	6	5	11	7	29	5	ARIA: 6× Platinum; GLF: Platinum; RMNZ: 4× Platinum	Girl on Fire
"Out of My Mind" (B.o.B featuring Nicki Minaj)	2012	—	—	—	—	—	—	—	—	—	166	RIAA: Gold	Strange Clouds
"Beauty and a Beat" (Justin Bieber featuring Nicki Minaj)	2012	5	—	—	5	4	28	2	6	1	3	RIAA: 8× Platinum; ARIA: 7× Platinum; BPI: 3× Platinum; MC: 3× Platinum; RMNZ: 5× Platinum	Believe
"Freaks" (French Montana featuring Nicki Minaj)	2013	77	25	18	—	—	140	—	—	—	161	RIAA: Gold	Excuse My French
"Tapout" (Rich Gang featuring Lil Wayne, Birdman, Mack Maine, Nicki Minaj, and Future)	2013	44	10	8	—	—	134	—	—	—	—	RIAA: Gold	Rich Gang
"Tonight I'm Getting Over You (Remix)" (Carly Rae Jepsen featuring Nicki Minaj)	2013	90	—	—	38	88	82	32	40	—	33		Non-album singles
"Somebody Else" (Mario featuring Nicki Minaj)	2013	— (Note: "Somebody Else" did not enter the Billboard Hot 100, but peaked at number four on the Bubbling Under Hot 100 Singles chart.)	36	—	—	—	—	—	—	—	—		Non-album singles
"I'm Out" (Ciara featuring Nicki Minaj)	2013	44	13	—	41	86	159	—	—	—	54	RIAA: Gold	Ciara
"Twerk It" (Busta Rhymes featuring Nicki Minaj)	2013	—	— (Note: "Twerk It" did not enter the Hot R&B/Hip-Hop Songs chart, but peaked at number four on the Bubbling Under R&B/Hip-Hop Singles chart.)	—	—	—	—	—	—	—	—		Non-album single
"Get Like Me" (Nelly featuring Nicki Minaj and Pharrell)	2013	— (Note: "Get Like Me" did not enter the Billboard Hot 100, but peaked at number eight on the Bubbling Under Hot 100 Singles chart.)	36	—	—	—	—	96	—	—	19		M.O.
"Love More" (Chris Brown featuring Nicki Minaj)	2013	23	7	—	29	—	118	—	—	—	32	RIAA: 2× Platinum; ARIA: Platinum; BPI: Silver; RMNZ: Gold	X
"I Wanna Be with You" (DJ Khaled featuring Nicki Minaj, Future, and Rick Ross)	2013	— (Note: "I Wanna Be With You" did not enter the Billboard Hot 100, but peaked at number one on the Bubbling Under Hot 100 Singles chart.)	30	22	—	—	—	—	—	—	—	RIAA: Gold	Suffering from Success
"Clappers" (Wale featuring Nicki Minaj and Juicy J)	2013	— (Note: "Clappers" did not enter the Billboard Hot 100, but peaked at number eight on the Bubbling Under Hot 100 Singles chart.)	37	—	—	—	—	—	—	—	—		The Gifted
"Lookin Ass" (Young Money featuring Nicki Minaj)	2014	— (Note: "Lookin Ass" did not enter the Billboard Hot 100, but peaked at number four on the Bubbling Under Hot 100 Singles chart.)	28	16	—	—	—	—	—	—	—		Rise of an Empire
"She Came to Give It to You" (Usher featuring Nicki Minaj)	2014	89	27	—	32	56	38	76	—	—	16	ARIA: Platinum	Hard II Love
"No Love (Remix)" (August Alsina featuring Nicki Minaj)	2014	69	—	—	—	—	—	—	—	—	—	BPI: Silver	Testimony
"Low" (Juicy J featuring Nicki Minaj, Lil Bibby, and Young Thug)	2014	—	46	—	—	—	—	—	—	—	—		Non-album single
"Flawless (Remix)" (Beyoncé featuring Nicki Minaj)	2014	41	12	—	—	88	83	77	—	—	65	ARIA: Gold; BPI: Silver	Beyoncé: Platinum Edition
"Touchin', Lovin'" (Trey Songz featuring Nicki Minaj)	2014	43	12	—	88	—	—	—	—	—	79	RIAA: Platinum; BPI: Silver; RMNZ: Platinum	Trigga
"Throw Sum Mo" (Rae Sremmurd featuring Nicki Minaj and Young Thug)	2014	30	12	6	—	—	—	—	—	—	—	RIAA: 3× Platinum; RMNZ: Gold	SremmLife
"Hey Mama" (David Guetta featuring Nicki Minaj, Bebe Rexha, and Afrojack)	2015	8	—	—	5	9	6	5	5	6	9	RIAA: 4× Platinum; ARIA: 2× Platinum; BPI: Platinum; GLF: 2× Platinum; MC: 3× Platinum; RMNZ: 2× Platinum	Listen
"Bitch I'm Madonna" (Madonna featuring Nicki Minaj)	2015	84	—	—	—	58	90	—	—	—	—		Rebel Heart
"All Eyes on You" (Meek Mill featuring Chris Brown and Nicki Minaj)	2015	21	8	5	51	40	186	76	— (Note: "All Eyes on You" did not enter the NZ Top 40 Singles Chart, but peaked at number nine on the NZ Heatseeker Singles Chart.)	89	55	RIAA: 2× Platinum; BPI: Platinum; RMNZ: 2× Platinum	Dreams Worth More Than Money
"Back Together" (Robin Thicke featuring Nicki Minaj)	2015	— (Note: "Back Together" did not enter the Billboard Hot 100, but peaked at number 25 on the Bubbling Under Hot 100 Singles chart.)	41	—	—	—	144	—	—	—	—		Non-album single
"Down in the DM (Remix)" (Yo Gotti featuring Nicki Minaj)	2016	13	3	2	—	59	—	—	—	—	—		The Art of Hustle
"No Broken Hearts" (Bebe Rexha featuring Nicki Minaj)	2016	— (Note: "No Broken Hearts" did not enter the Billboard Hot 100, but peaked at number nine on the Bubbling Under Hot 100 Singles chart.)	—	—	—	97	—	—	—	—	—		Non-album single
"Don't Hurt Me" (DJ Mustard featuring Nicki Minaj and Jeremih)	2016	—	— (Note: "Don't Hurt Me" did not enter the Hot R&B/Hip-Hop Songs chart, but peaked at number nine on the Bubbling Under R&B/Hip-Hop Singles chart.)	—	20	—	—	—	—	—	—	RIAA: Gold; ARIA: Gold; RMNZ: Platinum	Cold Summer
"Do You Mind" (DJ Khaled featuring Nicki Minaj, Chris Brown, August Alsina, Jeremih, Future, and Rick Ross)	2016	27	9	7	65	93	162	—	— (Note: "Do You Mind" did not enter the NZ Top 40 Singles Chart, but peaked at number five on the NZ Heatseeker Singles Chart.)	—	—	RIAA: 4× Platinum; ARIA: 2× Platinum; BPI: Silver; RMNZ: 2× Platinum	Major Key
"Side to Side" (Ariana Grande featuring Nicki Minaj)	2016	4	—	—	3	4	66	5	2	13	4	RIAA: 8× Platinum; ARIA: 7× Platinum; BPI: 3× Platinum; GLF: 3× Platinum; MC: 8× Platinum; RMNZ: 5× Platinum; SNEP: Platinum	Dangerous Woman
"Run Up" (Major Lazer featuring PartyNextDoor and Nicki Minaj)	2017	66	26	—	27	20	16	25	14	23	20	ARIA: Platinum; BPI: Platinum; RMNZ: Platinum; SNEP: Platinum	Major Lazer Essentials
"Swalla" (Jason Derulo featuring Nicki Minaj and Ty Dolla Sign)	2017	29	—	—	17	15	6	9	7	8	6	RIAA: 2× Platinum; ARIA: 3× Platinum; BPI: 2× Platinum; MC: 6× Platinum; RMNZ: 4× Platinum; SNEP: Diamond	Nu King
"Light My Body Up" (David Guetta featuring Nicki Minaj and Lil Wayne)	2017	— (Note: "Light My Body Up" did not enter the Billboard Hot 100, but peaked at number six on the Bubbling Under Hot 100 Singles chart.)	—	—	29	62	92	85	— (Note: "Light My Body Up" did not enter the NZ Top 40 Singles Chart, but peaked at number three on the NZ Heatseeker Singles Chart.)	55	64		Non-album single
"Kissing Strangers" (DNCE featuring Nicki Minaj)	2017	— (Note: "Kissing Strangers" did not enter the Billboard Hot 100, but peaked at number three on the Bubbling Under Hot 100 Singles chart.)	—	—	96	73	—	—	—	—	—		DNCE
"Swish Swish" (Katy Perry featuring Nicki Minaj)	2017	46	—	—	22	13	117	28	—	53	19	RIAA: Platinum; ARIA: 2× Platinum; BPI: Platinum; MC: Platinum; RMNZ: Platinum; SNEP: Gold	Witness
"Rake It Up" (Yo Gotti and Mike Will Made It featuring Nicki Minaj)	2017	8	5	3	—	52	—	—	—	—	—	RIAA: 5× Platinum; MC: 2× Platinum; RMNZ: Platinum	Gotti Made-It
"You da Baddest" (Future featuring Nicki Minaj)	2017	38	19	14	—	53	—	—	—	—	—	RIAA: Platinum; MC: Gold	Hndrxx
"You Already Know" (Fergie featuring Nicki Minaj)	2017	—	—	—	95	—	—	—	—	—	96		Double Dutchess
"The Way Life Goes (Remix)" (Lil Uzi Vert featuring Nicki Minaj)	2017	24	11	11	—	44	—	—	—	—	87	BPI: Platinum	Non-album single
"Ball for Me" (Post Malone featuring Nicki Minaj)	2018	16	11	8	14	7	—	23	—	47	70	RIAA: 3× Platinum; ARIA: 2× Platinum; BPI: Gold; MC: 4× Platinum; RMNZ: Platinum	Beerbongs & Bentleys
"Big Bank" (YG featuring 2 Chainz, Big Sean, and Nicki Minaj)	2018	16	13	10	—	51	—	—	—	—	—	RIAA: 5× Platinum; MC: Gold; RMNZ: Platinum	Stay Dangerous
"Fefe" (6ix9ine featuring Nicki Minaj and Murda Beatz)	2018	3	3	3	8	3	16	21	3	6	17	RIAA: 5× Platinum; BPI: Gold; GLF: Platinum; MC: Platinum; RMNZ: 2× Platinum; SNEP: Platinum	Dummy Boy and Queen
"Goodbye" (Jason Derulo and David Guetta featuring Nicki Minaj and Willy William)	2018	— (Note: "Goodbye" did not enter the Billboard Hot 100, but peaked at number seven on the Bubbling Under Hot 100 Singles chart.)	—	—	33	68	—	21	— (Note: "Goodbye" did not enter the NZ Top 40 Singles Chart, but peaked at number seven on the NZ Hot Singles Chart.)	16	26	RIAA: Gold; ARIA: Platinum; BPI: Gold; MC: Platinum; RMNZ: Gold; SNEP: Gold	7
"Idol" (BTS featuring Nicki Minaj)	2018	11	—	—	—	5	103	—	—	—	—		Love Yourself: Answer
"Woman Like Me" (Little Mix featuring Nicki Minaj)	2018	— (Note: "Woman Like Me" did not enter the Billboard Hot 100, but peaked at number four on the Bubbling Under Hot 100 Singles chart.)	—	—	23	60	—	3	23	65	2	ARIA: Platinum; BPI: 2× Platinum; MC: Gold; RMNZ: Platinum	LM5
"Dip" (Tyga featuring Nicki Minaj)	2018	63	31	—	—	51	—	—	—	—	62	RMNZ: Platinum	Legendary
"No Candle No Light" (Zayn featuring Nicki Minaj)	2018	—	—	—	95	—	—	—	— (Note: "No Candle No Light" did not enter the NZ Top 40 Singles Chart, but peaked at number six on the NZ Hot Singles Chart.)	—	—		Icarus Falls
"Dumb Blonde" (Avril Lavigne featuring Nicki Minaj)	2019	—	—	—	—	92	—	—	—	—	—		Head Above Water
"Wobble Up" (Chris Brown featuring Nicki Minaj and G-Eazy)	2019	— (Note: "Wobble Up" did not enter the Billboard Hot 100, but peaked at number three on the Bubbling Under Hot 100 Singles chart.)	46	—	—	—	—	—	—	—	—	RIAA: Gold; RMNZ: Gold	Indigo
"BAPS" (Trina featuring Nicki Minaj)	2019	—	—	—	—	—	—	—	—	—	—		The One
"Hot Girl Summer" (Megan Thee Stallion featuring Nicki Minaj and Ty Dolla Sign)	2019	11	7	5	64	38	—	51	— (Note: "Hot Girl Summer" did not enter the NZ Top 40 Singles Chart, but peaked at number two on the NZ Hot Singles Chart.)	—	40	RIAA: 2× Platinum; BPI: Silver; MC: 2× Platinum; RMNZ: Platinum	Non-album single
"Welcome to the Party (Remix)" (Pop Smoke featuring Nicki Minaj)	2019	— (Note: "Welcome to the Party" did not enter the Billboard Hot 100, but peaked at number five on the Bubbling Under Hot 100 Singles chart.)	48	—	—	—	—	—	—	—	—	RMNZ: Platinum	Meet the Woo (Deluxe)
"Ya Lil" (Ramage featuring Nicki Minaj)	2019	—	—	—	—	—	—	—	—	—	—		Al Anesa Farah – Music from the Original TV Series
"Nice to Meet Ya" (Meghan Trainor featuring Nicki Minaj)	2020	89	—	—	—	—	—	88	— (Note: "Nice to Meet Ya" did not enter the NZ Top 40 Singles Chart, but peaked at number 13 on the NZ Hot Singles Chart.)	—	88		Treat Myself
"Say So (Remix)" (Doja Cat featuring Nicki Minaj)	2020	1	1	—	—	3	—	—	—	—	—		Hot Pink (Deluxe)
"Move Ya Hips" (ASAP Ferg featuring Nicki Minaj and MadeinTYO)	2020	19	8	6	—	73	—	—	—	—	—		Floor Seats II
"Expensive" (Ty Dolla Sign featuring Nicki Minaj)	2020	83	27	—	—	—	—	—	—	—	—		Featuring Ty Dolla Sign
"Oh My Gawd" (Mr Eazi and Major Lazer featuring Nicki Minaj and K4mo)	2020	—	—	—	—	—	—	—	—	—	—		Music Is the Weapon
"Whole Lotta Choppas (Remix)" (Sada Baby featuring Nicki Minaj)	2020	35	12	11	—	91	—	—	—	—	—		Non-album single
"Whole Lotta Money (Remix)" (Bia featuring Nicki Minaj)	2021	16	6	4	—	42	—	—	—	—	—		For Certain (Deluxe)
"Boyz" (Jesy Nelson featuring Nicki Minaj)	2021	― (Note: "Boyz" did not enter the Billboard Hot 100, but peaked at number 13 on the Bubbling Under Hot 100 Singles chart.)	―	―	—	―	—	16	— (Note: "Boyz" did not enter the NZ Top 40 Singles Chart, but peaked at number four on the NZ Hot Singles Chart.)	—	4	BPI: Silver	Non-album single
"WTF" (YoungBoy Never Broke Again featuring Nicki Minaj)	2023	99	32	23	—	—	—	—	—	—	—		Don't Try This at Home
"Pound Town 2" (Sexyy Red featuring Nicki Minaj and Tay Keith)	2023	66	21	14	—	—	—	—	—	—	—		Hood Hottest Princess
"Endless Fashion" (Lil Uzi Vert featuring Nicki Minaj)	2023	20	9	5	—	39	—	—	— (Note: "Endless Fashion" did not enter the NZ Top 40 Singles Chart, but peaked at number 3 on the NZ Hot Singles Chart.)	—	75		Pink Tape
"—" denotes a recording that did not chart or was not released in that territory.

=== Promotional singles ===
List of promotional singles
Title	Year	Peak chart positions						Certifications	Album
Title	Year	US	US R&B/ HH	US Rap	AUS	CAN	UK	Certifications	Album
"5 Star" (Remix) (Yo Gotti featuring Gucci Mane, Trina and Nicki Minaj)	2009	—	—	—	—	—	—		Live from the Kitchen
"All I Do Is Win" (Remix) (DJ Khaled featuring T-Pain, Diddy, Nicki Minaj, Rick Ross, Busta Rhymes, Fabolous, Jadakiss, Fat Joe and Swizz Beatz)	2010	—	—	—	—	—	—		Non-album promotional singles
"Hello Good Morning" (Remix) (Diddy – Dirty Money featuring Nicki Minaj and Rick Ross)	2010	—	—	—	—	—	—		Non-album promotional singles
"Roman's Revenge" (featuring Eminem)	2010	56	85	23	—	—	125	ARIA: Gold	Pink Friday
"Till the World Ends" (The Femme Fatale Remix) (Britney Spears featuring Nicki Minaj and Kesha)	2011	3	—	—	—	4	—		Non-album promotional singles
"Roman in Moscow"	2011	64	— (Note: "Roman in Moscow" did not enter the Hot R&B/Hip-Hop Songs chart, but peaked at number eight on the Bubbling Under R&B/Hip-Hop Singles chart.)	—	—	88	84		Non-album promotional singles
"Stupid Hoe"	2011	59	53	—	—	87	63	RIAA: Platinum; ARIA: Gold	Pink Friday: Roman Reloaded
"Roman Reloaded" (featuring Lil Wayne)	2012	70	57	—	—	—	143		Pink Friday: Roman Reloaded
"Born Stunna" (Remix) (Birdman featuring Rick Ross, Nicki Minaj and Lil Wayne)	2012	—	—	—	—	—	—		Bigga Than Life
"Senile" (Young Money featuring Tyga, Nicki Minaj and Lil Wayne)	2014	—	50	—	—	—	—		Rise of an Empire
"All Things Go"	2014	— (Note: "All Things Go" did not enter the Billboard Hot 100, but peaked at number 15 on the Bubbling Under Hot 100 Singles chart.)	38	—	—	—	—		The Pinkprint
"Trini Dem Girls" (featuring LunchMoney Lewis)	2015	—	— (Note: "Trini Dem Girls" did not enter the Hot R&B/Hip-Hop Songs chart, but peaked at number one on the Bubbling Under R&B/Hip-Hop Singles chart.)	—	—	—	—		The Pinkprint
"Black Barbies" (with Mike Will Made It)	2016	65	30	20	47	78	—	ARIA: Gold	Non-album promotional single
"Anybody" (Young Thug featuring Nicki Minaj)	2018	89	43	—	—	—	—	RIAA: Gold	Hear No Evil
"Rich Sex" (featuring Lil Wayne)	2018	56	24	22	—	86	—	ARIA: Gold	Queen
"The Light Is Coming" (Ariana Grande featuring Nicki Minaj)	2018	89	—	—	60	63	57	ARIA: Gold; BPI: Silver	Sweetener
"Fendi" (PnB Rock featuring Nicki Minaj and Murda Beatz)	2019	—	—	—	—	—	—		Non-album promotional singles
"Yikes"	2020	23	13	8	—	54	69	RIAA: Platinum; ARIA: Gold; RMNZ: Gold	Non-album promotional singles
"Likkle Miss" (Remix) (with Skeng)	2022	—	—	—	—	—	—		Queen Radio: Volume 1
"For All the Barbz" (featuring Drake and Chief Keef)	2023	—	—	—	—	—	—		Non-album promotional single
"—" denotes a recording that did not chart or was not released in that territory.

== Other charted songs ==
List of songs
Title	Year	Peak chart positions										Certifications	Album
Title	Year	US	US R&B/ HH	US Rap	AUS	CAN	FRA	NZ Hot	UK	UK R&B	WW	Certifications	Album
"I Get Crazy" (featuring Lil Wayne)	2009	—	37	20	—	—	—	—	—	—	—		Beam Me Up Scotty
"Itty Bitty Piggy"	2009	82	41	—	—	—	—	40	—	—	—		Beam Me Up Scotty
"Sex in Crazy Places" (Gucci Mane featuring Bobby V, Nicki Minaj and Trina)	2009	—	— (Note: "Sex in Crazy Places" did not enter the Hot R&B/Hip-Hop Songs chart, but peaked at number 22 on the Bubbling Under R&B/Hip-Hop Singles chart.)	—	—	—	—	—	—	—	—		The State vs. Radric Davis
"Shakin' It 4 Daddy" (Robin Thicke featuring Nicki Minaj)	2009	—	— (Note: "Shakin' It 4 Daddy" did not enter the Hot R&B/Hip-Hop Songs chart, but peaked at number 16 on the Bubbling Under R&B/Hip-Hop Singles chart.)	—	—	—	—	—	—	—	—		Sex Therapy
"Girlfriend"	2010	—	— (Note: "Girlfriend" did not enter the Hot R&B/Hip-Hop Songs chart, but peaked at number 13 on the Bubbling Under R&B/Hip-Hop Singles chart.)	—	—	—	—	—	—	—	—		None
"Up All Night" (Drake featuring Nicki Minaj)	2010	49	59	20	—	80	—	—	—	—	—	RIAA: Platinum; ARIA: Gold; BPI: Silver	Thank Me Later
"What's Wrong with Them" (Lil Wayne featuring Nicki Minaj)	2010	42	—	—	—	45	—	—	83	—	—		I Am Not a Human Being
"Haterade" (Gucci Mane featuring Pharrell and Nicki Minaj)	2010	—	— (Note: "Haterade" did not enter the Hot R&B/Hip-Hop Songs chart, but peaked at number 22 on the Bubbling Under R&B/Hip-Hop Singles chart.)	—	—	—	—	—	—	—	—		The Appeal: Georgia's Most Wanted
"Blazin'" (featuring Kanye West)	2010	—	— (Note: "Blazin'" did not enter the Hot R&B/Hip-Hop Songs chart, but peaked at number four on the Bubbling Under R&B/Hip-Hop Singles chart.)	—	—	—	—	—	—	—	—		Pink Friday
"Bought the Bar" (DJ Webstar featuring Nicki Minaj)	2011	—	— (Note: "Bought the Bar" did not enter the Hot R&B/Hip-Hop Songs chart, but peaked at number six on the Bubbling Under R&B/Hip-Hop Singles chart.)	—	—	—	—	—	—	—	—		None
"Feel Inside" (Mary J. Blige featuring Nicki Minaj)	2011	—	— (Note: "Feel Inside" did not enter the Hot R&B/Hip-Hop Songs chart, but peaked at number 11 on the Bubbling Under R&B/Hip-Hop Singles chart.)	—	—	—	—	—	—	—	—		None
"Muthafucka Up" (Tyga featuring Nicki Minaj)	2012	74	—	—	—	—	—	—	—	—	—		Careless World: Rise of the Last King
"Roman Holiday"	2012	— (Note: "Roman Holiday" did not enter the Billboard Hot 100, but peaked at number 13 on the Bubbling Under Hot 100 Singles chart.)	—	—	—	—	—	—	—	—	—		Pink Friday: Roman Reloaded
"I Am Your Leader" (featuring Cam'ron and Rick Ross)	2012	—	71	—	—	—	—	—	—	—	—		Pink Friday: Roman Reloaded
"Whip It"	2012	— (Note: "Whip It" did not enter the Billboard Hot 100, but peaked at number 23 on the Bubbling Under Hot 100 Singles chart.)	—	—	63	85	—	—	98	26	—		Pink Friday: Roman Reloaded
"Marilyn Monroe"	2012	— (Note: "Marilyn Monroe" did not enter the Billboard Hot 100, but peaked at number four on the Bubbling Under Hot 100 Singles chart.)	—	—	—	—	—	—	121	—	—		Pink Friday: Roman Reloaded
"Masquerade"	2012	—	—	—	—	—	89	—	—	—	—		Pink Friday: Roman Reloaded
"Up in Flames"	2012	—	—	—	—	—	—	—	134	25	—		Pink Friday: Roman Reloaded – The Re-Up
"Hell Yeah" (featuring Parker)	2012	—	— (Note: "Hell Yeah" did not enter the Hot R&B/Hip-Hop Songs chart, but peaked at number seven on the Bubbling Under R&B/Hip-Hop Singles chart.)	—	—	—	—	—	122	22	—		Pink Friday: Roman Reloaded – The Re-Up
"I'm Legit" (featuring Ciara)	2012	—	40	—	—	—	—	—	97	14	—		Pink Friday: Roman Reloaded – The Re-Up
"I Endorse These Strippers" (featuring Tyga and Brinx)	2012	—	— (Note: "I Endorse These Strippers" did not enter the Hot R&B/Hip-Hop Songs chart, but peaked at number four on the Bubbling Under R&B/Hip-Hop Singles chart.)	—	—	—	—	—	143	28	—		Pink Friday: Roman Reloaded – The Re-Up
"I Luv Dem Strippers" (2 Chainz featuring Nicki Minaj)	2012	— (Note: "I Luv Dem Strippers" did not enter the Billboard Hot 100, but peaked at number 21 on the Bubbling Under Hot 100 Singles chart.)	41	—	—	—	—	—	—	—	—	RIAA: Gold	Based on a T.R.U. Story
"Lay It Down" (Lil Wayne featuring Nicki Minaj and Cory Gunz)	2013	—	— (Note: "Lay It Down" did not enter the Hot R&B/Hip-Hop Songs chart, but peaked at number eight on the Bubbling Under R&B/Hip-Hop Singles chart.)	—	—	—	—	—	—	—	—		I Am Not a Human Being II
"I Lied"	2014	— (Note: "I Lied" did not enter the Billboard Hot 100, but peaked at number 14 on the Bubbling Under Hot 100 Singles chart.)	37	—	—	—	—	—	—	39	—		The Pinkprint
"The Crying Game" (featuring Jessie Ware)	2014	— (Note: "The Crying Game" did not enter the Billboard Hot 100, but peaked at number 13 on the Bubbling Under Hot 100 Singles chart.)	39	—	—	—	—	—	—	—	—		The Pinkprint
"Get On Your Knees" (featuring Ariana Grande)	2014	88	26	18	80	98	181	—	86	7	—		The Pinkprint
"Feeling Myself" (featuring Beyoncé)	2014	39	11	6	52	67	53	—	64	12	—	RIAA: 2× Platinum; ARIA: 2× Platinum; BPI: Gold; RMNZ: Platinum	The Pinkprint
"Want Some More"	2014	—	— (Note: "Want Some More" did not enter the Hot R&B/Hip-Hop Songs chart, but peaked at number one on the Bubbling Under R&B/Hip-Hop Singles chart.)	—	—	—	—	—	—	—	—		The Pinkprint
"Four Door Aventador"	2014	—	— (Note: "Four Door Aventador" did not enter the Hot R&B/Hip-Hop Songs chart, but peaked at number eight on the Bubbling Under R&B/Hip-Hop Singles chart.)	—	—	—	—	—	—	—	—		The Pinkprint
"Favorite" (featuring Jeremih)	2014	—	44	—	—	—	—	—	—	—	—		The Pinkprint
"Buy a Heart" (featuring Meek Mill)	2014	—	48	—	—	—	—	—	—	—	—		The Pinkprint
"Grand Piano"	2014	— (Note: "Grand Piano" did not enter the Billboard Hot 100, but peaked at number 23 on the Bubbling Under Hot 100 Singles chart.)	—	—	—	—	—	—	—	—	—		The Pinkprint
"Big Daddy" (featuring Meek Mill)	2014	—	— (Note: "Big Daddy" did not enter the Hot R&B/Hip-Hop Songs chart, but peaked at number two on the Bubbling Under R&B/Hip-Hop Singles chart.)	—	—	—	—	—	—	—	—		The Pinkprint
"Shanghai"	2014	—	— (Note: "Shanghai" did not enter the Hot R&B/Hip-Hop Songs chart, but peaked at number six on the Bubbling Under R&B/Hip-Hop Singles chart.)	—	—	—	—	—	—	—	—		The Pinkprint
"Bad for You" (Meek Mill featuring Nicki Minaj)	2015	78	23	19	—	—	—	—	—	—	—	RIAA: Gold	Dreams Worth More Than Money
"Froze" (Meek Mill featuring Lil Uzi Vert and Nicki Minaj)	2016	68	28	21	—	—	—	—	—	—	—		DC4
"Bom Bidi Bom" (with Nick Jonas)	2017	54	—	—	—	69	58	—	87	—	—		Fifty Shades Darker
"Krippy Kush" (Remix) (with Farruko, Bad Bunny, 21 Savage and Rvssian)	2017	75	—	—	—	—	—	—	—	—	—		None
"Plain Jane" (Remix) (ASAP Ferg featuring Nicki Minaj)	2017	26	13	12	—	—	—	—	—	—	—		None
"Poke It Out" (Playboi Carti with Nicki Minaj)	2018	— (Note: "Poke It Out" did not enter the Billboard Hot 100, but peaked at number 13 on the Bubbling Under Hot 100 Singles chart.)	— (Note: "Poke It Out" did not enter the Hot R&B/Hip-Hop Songs chart, but peaked at number six on the Bubbling Under R&B/Hip-Hop Singles chart.)	—	—	—	—	—	—	—	—		Die Lit
"Ganja Burn"	2018	60	27	25	—	47	—	13	—	—	—		Queen
"Majesty" (with Labrinth featuring Eminem)	2018	58	25	23	60	44	—	6	41	—	—	ARIA: Gold	Queen
"Hard White"	2018	— (Note: "Hard White" did not enter the Billboard Hot 100, but peaked at number six on the Bubbling Under Hot 100 Singles chart.)	— (Note: "Hard White" did not enter the Hot R&B/Hip-Hop Songs chart, but peaked at number three on the Bubbling Under R&B/Hip-Hop Singles chart.)	—	—	—	—	—	—	—	—		Queen
"Thought I Knew You" (featuring The Weeknd)	2018	98	49	—	—	69	—	19	—	—	—		Queen
"Chun Swae" (featuring Swae Lee)	2018	— (Note: "Chun Swae" did not enter the Billboard Hot 100, but peaked at number seven on the Bubbling Under Hot 100 Singles chart.)	— (Note: "Chun Swae" did not enter the Hot R&B/Hip-Hop Songs chart, but peaked at number four on the Bubbling Under R&B/Hip-Hop Singles chart.)	—	—	—	—	—	—	—	—		Queen
"LLC"	2018	— (Note: "LLC" did not enter the Billboard Hot 100, but peaked at number eight on the Bubbling Under Hot 100 Singles chart.)	— (Note: "LLC" did not enter the Hot R&B/Hip-Hop Songs chart, but peaked at number five on the Bubbling Under R&B/Hip-Hop Singles chart.)	—	—	—	—	—	—	—	—		Queen
"Dark Side of the Moon" (Lil Wayne featuring Nicki Minaj)	2018	26	19	—	—	55	—	—	—	—	—		Tha Carter V
"Mama" (6ix9ine featuring Nicki Minaj and Kanye West)	2018	43	18	17	22	16	—	—	29	—	—	RIAA: Gold	Dummy Boy
"Familia" (with Anuel AA featuring Bantu)	2018	—	—	—	—	—	—	13	—	—	—		Spider-Man: Into the Spider-Verse
"iPhone" (with DaBaby)	2019	43	22	—	—	—	—	—	—	—	—		Kirk
"Bad to You" (with Ariana Grande and Normani)	2019	— (Note: "Bad to You" did not enter the Billboard Hot 100, but peaked at number four on the Bubbling Under Hot 100 chart.)	—	—	63	82	—	—	51	—	—		Charlie's Angels
"Seeing Green" (with Drake and Lil Wayne)	2021	12	8	6	—	27	—	7	42	—	—		Beam Me Up Scotty
"Fractions"	2021	52	29	—	—	—	—	24	—	—	—		Beam Me Up Scotty
"Crocodile Teeth" (with Skillibeng)	2021	100	—	—	—	—	—	—	—	—	—		Beam Me Up Scotty
"Chi-Raq" (with G Herbo)	2021	— (Note: "Chi-Raq" did not enter the Billboard Hot 100, but peaked at number five on the Bubbling Under Hot 100 chart.)	—	—	—	—	—	—	—	—	—		Beam Me Up Scotty
"Boss Ass Bitch" (with PTAF)	2021	— (Note: "Boss Ass Bitch" did not enter the Billboard Hot 100, but peaked at number 16 on the Bubbling Under Hot 100 chart.)	—	—	—	—	—	—	—	—	—		Beam Me Up Scotty
"For the Love of New York" (with Polo G)	2021	— (Note: "For the Love of New York" did not enter the Billboard Hot 100, but peaked at number one on the Bubbling Under Hot 100 chart.)	45	—	—	—	—	—	—	—	—		Hall of Fame
"I Admit" (YoungBoy Never Broke Again featuring Nicki Minaj)	2022	— (Note: "I Admit" did not enter the Billboard Hot 100, but peaked at number eight on the Bubbling Under Hot 100 chart.)	42	—	—	—	—	—	—	—	—		Ma' I Got a Family
"Are You Gone Already"	2023	60	—	—	—	67	—	2	—	—	90		Pink Friday 2
"Barbie Dangerous"	2023	58	13	10	—	73	—	—	—	—	110		Pink Friday 2
"Beep Beep" (solo or featuring 50 Cent)	2023	64	15	12	—	79	—	28	—	—	115		Pink Friday 2
"Fallin 4 U"	2023	74	21	17	—	100	—	—	—	—	156		Pink Friday 2
"Let Me Calm Down" (featuring J. Cole)	2023	63	14	11	—	68	—	—	—	—	121		Pink Friday 2
"RNB" (featuring Lil Wayne and Tate Kobang)	2023	80	22	18	—	—	—	—	—	—	—		Pink Friday 2
"Pink Birthday"	2023	89	26	24	—	—	—	—	—	—	—		Pink Friday 2
"Needle" (featuring Drake)	2023	34	7	—	—	32	—	6	58	—	43		Pink Friday 2
"Cowgirl" (featuring Lourdiz)	2023	87	—	23	—	—	—	—	—	—	—		Pink Friday 2
"Big Difference"	2023	73	20	16	—	91	—	—	—	—	136		Pink Friday 2
"Forward from Trini" (featuring Skillibeng and Skeng)	2023	— (Note: "Forward from Trini" did not enter the Billboard Hot 100, but peaked at number 13 on the Bubbling Under Hot 100 Singles chart.)	—	—	—	—	—	—	—	—	—		Pink Friday 2
"Pink Friday Girls"	2023	82	—	20	—	69	—	20	30	—	181	RMNZ: Gold	Pink Friday 2
"Bahm Bahm"	2023	95	27	25	—	—	—	—	—	—	—		Pink Friday 2
"My Life"	2023	— (Note: "My Life" did not enter the Billboard Hot 100, but peaked at number eight on the Bubbling Under Hot 100 Singles chart.)	34	—	—	—	—	—	—	—	—		Pink Friday 2
"Nicki Hendrix" (featuring Future)	2023	— (Note: "Nicki Hendrix" did not enter the Billboard Hot 100, but peaked at number seven on the Bubbling Under Hot 100 Singles chart.)	33	—	—	—	—	—	—	—	—		Pink Friday 2
"Blessings" (featuring Tasha Cobbs Leonard)	2023	— (Note: "Blessings" did not enter the Billboard Hot 100, but peaked at number 22 on the Bubbling Under Hot 100 Singles chart.)	—	—	—	—	—	—	—	—	—		Pink Friday 2
"Just the Memories"	2023	— (Note: "Just the Memories" did not enter the Billboard Hot 100, but peaked at number 23 on the Bubbling Under Hot 100 Singles chart.)	—	—	—	—	—	—	—	—	—		Pink Friday 2
"Love Me Enough" (featuring Keyshia Cole and Monica)	2023	—	— (Note: "Love Me Enough" did not enter the Billboard Hot R&B/Hip-Hop Songs, but peaked at number six on the R&B/Hip-Hop Digital Songs chart.)	— (Note: "Love Me Enough" did not enter the Billboard Hot Rap Songs, but peaked at number five on the Rap Digital Song Sales chart.)	—	—	—	—	—	—	—		Pink Friday 2
"—" denotes a recording that did not chart or was not released in that territory.

== Guest appearances ==
List of non-single guest appearances, with other performing artists, showing year released and album name
Title	Year	Other artist(s)	Album
"Don't Mess With"	2004	Jim Johnston	ThemeAddict: WWE The Music, Vol. 6
"I Might"	2004	Angel Demar	None
"Who Runs This?"	2004	Angel Demar	None
"Affirmative Action"	2006	Gravy	Mayor Goonberg Visits Africa
"Can't Stop, Won't Stop"	2007	Lil Wayne	Da Drought 3
"Monstar Biz"	2007	Gravy	N.Y. Target
"I Just Borrow"	2007	Ru Spits	Feature Presentation: Ru Spits
"Do You Like It"	2007	Ransom	The Ransom Note
"Not At All"	2007	Ru Spits	Ghetto Entertainer
"Minaj Et Trois"	2008	SAS	Where Is SAS
"*Ucci *Ucci"	2008	Enur	Raggatronic
"Still I Rise"	2008	Lil Wayne	Dedication 3
"Big Bidness"	2008	Ransom	Pain & Glory 2
"Million Dolla Baby" (Remix)	2008	Max B, Knocka	Wavie Crockett
"Make It Last Forever" (Remix)	2008	Ciara	None
"Miss Independent" (Remix)	2008	Ne-Yo	None
"One Night Only" (Remix)	2008	Jason Kay	None
"Pamper Me"	2008	Angel Demar	None
"Ponytail"	2009	Mýa	Beauty & the Streets Vol. 1
"Lookin' at Me"	2009	Pearl Future	Play Date
"Automatic"	2009	Teairra Marí	Don't Make Me Cause a Scene
"Grindin' Making Money"	2009	Birdman, Lil' Kim	Priceless
"Take It Off"	2009	Lloyd, J. Holiday	Like Me: The Young Goldie EP
"I Bought That"	2009	Yung Ralph, DJ Scream	The Juug Man
"Where's Wayne"	2009	Lil Chuckee, Gudda Gudda, Jae Millz, Lil Twist	Charles Lee Ray
"New York Minute" (Remix)	2009	French Montana, Jadakiss	The French Connection
"Sweet Dreams"	2009	Lil Wayne	No Ceilings
"Girls Kissing Girls"	2009	Gucci Mane	Writing on the Wall
"All About the Benjamins"	2009	Stack Bundles, The Riot Squad	Jackin' 4 Beats
"20 Dollars" (Remix)	2009	Ron Browz, Mase, Shawty Lo, OJ Da Juiceman	Timeless EP
"Old Enough" (Remix)	2009	Lil Twist	Class President
"Sex in Crazy Places"	2009	Gucci Mane, Trina, Bobby V	The State vs. Radric Davis
"Always Love You"	2009	Gudda Gudda	Guddaville
"1234"	2009	Randall Rock	#LivingTheLife
"Birds"	2009	Yung Joc, Gucci Mane, OJ Da Juiceman	The Grind Flu
"Shakin' It 4 Daddy"	2009	Robin Thicke	Sex Therapy: The Session
"Get wit It"	2009	DJ E.Sudd, Smiley	Frontline
"Dopeman"	2009	Jabari, Pusha T	Famous on the Internet
"Diamonds on My Neck"	2009	Supplya, Gucci Mane	Supplya
"Failure (Pussy Nigga)"	2009	Gucci Mane	Kitchen Talk
"Strippin' in the Club"	2009	DJ Diamonds Kuts, Ron Browz, Latif	Herstory in the Making
"Supa Hot" (Remix)	2009	Sonny Rich, Jim Jones	Loud Pack
"Wanna Balla"	2009	Soulja Boy, Chingy	Live & Direct
"Lollipop Luxury" (Remix)	2009	Jeffree Star	Beauty Killer
"Break Up" (Remix)	2009	Mario, Gucci Mane	None
"Chocolate Legs" (Remix)	2009	Eric Benét	None
"T.E.M.P.O."	2009	Ashley	None
"Xcellent"	2009	Pritty Boy	None
"Nicki Minaj Speaks"	2010	Jae Millz	The Flood Warning
"Coca Coca"	2010	Gucci Mane, Waka Flocka Flame, Yo Gotti, DJ Holiday, OJ Da Juiceman, Shawty Lo, Rocko	Burrrprint (2) HD
"For the Money"	2010	Fabolous	There Is No Competition 2: The Grieving Music EP
"Dang a Lang"	2010	Trina, Lady Saw	Amazin'
"In My Head" (Remix)	2010	Jason Derulo	In My Head
"She Likes Me"	2010	Jadakiss	The Champ Is Here, Pt. 3
"Stilettos and T-Shirt"	2010	Bobby V	60 Minutes
"Hold Yuh" (Remix)	2010	Gyptian	None
"Up All Night"	2010	Drake	Thank Me Later
"What's Wrong with Them"	2010	Lil Wayne	I Am Not a Human Being
"YM Salute"	2010	Lil Wayne, Lil Chuckee, Gudda Gudda, Jae Millz, Lil Twist	I Am Not a Human Being
"Haterade"	2010	Gucci Mane, Pharrell	The Appeal: Georgia's Most Wanted
"Kiss My Ass"	2010	Bow Wow	Half Man, Half Dog, Part 2
"Mean Walk"	2010	Miss Daja	None
"Change Change"	2011	Verbal	Visionair
"Bought the Bar"	2011	DJ Webstar	None
"Get Low 4 Me" (Remix)	2011		None
"I Love You"	2011	Soulja Boy, Bobby V	None
"Feel Inside"	2011	Mary J. Blige	None
"La La Means I Love You"	2011	Hoodstars	None
"Born to be Wild"	2011	Sean Kingston	None
"Muthafucka Up"	2012	Tyga	Careless World: Rise of the Last King
"I Don't Give A"	2012	Madonna	MDNA
"I Luv Dem Strippers"	2012	2 Chainz	Based on a T.R.U. Story
"Mercy"	2012	Lil Wayne	Dedication 4
"Lay It Down"	2013	Lil Wayne, Cory Gunz	I Am Not a Human Being II
"Livin' It Up"	2013	Ciara	Ciara
"Rich Friday"	2013	DJ Clue, Future, French Montana, Juelz Santana	None
"MILF"	2013	Big Sean, Juicy J	Hall of Fame
"Entertainment 2.0"	2013	Sean Paul, Juicy J, 2 Chainz	Full Frequency
"Hands Up"	2013	Swizz Beatz, Lil Wayne, Rick Ross, 2 Chainz	None
"Give It All to Me"	2013	Mavado	Suffering from Success
"I B on Dat"	2013	Meek Mill, Fabolous, French Montana	Dreamchasers 3
"Dope Dealer"	2013	Meek Mill, Rick Ross	Dreamchasers 3
"My Nigga" (Remix)	2014	YG, Lil Wayne, Rich Homie Quan, Meek Mill	My Krazy Life
"Danny Glover" (Remix)	2014	Young Thug	None
"Animales"	2014	Romeo Santos	Formula, Vol. 2
"Rock Star"	2014	Future	None
"So Bad"	2014	Cam'ron, Yummy Bingham	1st of the Month Vol. 2
"No Flex Zone" (Remix)	2014	Rae Sremmurd, Pusha T	None
"True Colors"	2014	Wiz Khalifa	Blacc Hollywood
"Sugar" (Remix)	2015	Maroon 5	V
"Bad for You"	2015	Meek Mill	Dreams Worth More Than Money
"Angel"	2015	DJ Prostyle, Jeremih	None
"The Hills" (Remix)	2015	The Weeknd	None
"Doin' It Well"	2015	Fabolous, Trey Songz	Summertime Shootout
"Froze"	2016	Meek Mill, Lil Uzi Vert	DC4
"Like a Star"	2016	Fetty Wap	King Zoo
"Bom Bidi Bom"	2017	Nick Jonas	Fifty Shades Darker: Original Motion Picture Soundtrack
"Realize"	2017	2 Chainz	Pretty Girls Like Trap Music
"Nobody"	2017	DJ Khaled, Alicia Keys	Grateful
"I Can't Even Lie"	2017	DJ Khaled, Future	Grateful
"Skrt On Me"	2017	Calvin Harris	Funk Wav Bounces Vol. 1
"I'm Getting Ready"	2017	Tasha Cobbs	Heart. Passion. Pursuit.
"No Flag"	2017	London on da Track, 21 Savage, Offset	None
"She for Keeps"	2017	Quavo	Quality Control: Control the Streets Volume 1
"Plain Jane" (Remix)	2017	ASAP Ferg	None
"5 Star"	2017	Lil Wayne	Dedication 6
"Poke It Out"	2018	Playboi Carti	Die Lit
"Dark Side of the Moon"	2018	Lil Wayne	Tha Carter V
"Transformer"	2018	Future	Wrld on Drugs
"Runnin'"	2018	ASAP Rocky, ASAP Ferg	Creed II: The Album
"Mama"	2018	6ix9ine, Kanye West	Dummy Boy
"Touch Down" (Remix)	2018	Stylo G, The Fanatix, Vybz Kartel	None
"Familia"	2018	Anuel AA, Bantu	Spider-Man: Into the Spider-Verse
"Slide Around"	2019	Chance the Rapper, Lil Durk	The Big Day
"Zanies and Fools"	2019	Chance the Rapper	The Big Day
"Extravagant"	2019	Lil Durk	Love Songs 4 the Streets 2
"iPhone"	2019	DaBaby	Kirk
"Bad to You"	2019	Ariana Grande, Normani	Charlie's Angels
"Not Sorry"	2020	Rich the Kid	Boss Man
"Holy Ground"	2020	Davido	A Better Time
"For the Love of New York"	2021	Polo G	Hall of Fame
"Papi's Home"	2021	Drake	Certified Lover Boy
"Always Love You"	2021	Elton John, Young Thug	The Lockdown Sessions
"I Admit"	2022	YoungBoy Never Broke Again	Ma' I Got a Family
"Bad Like We" (Remix)	2022	Wiley, Popcaan, Dyo	None
"Shake The Place (Remix)"	2023	Destra, Machel Montano	None
"Money"	2023	Young Thug, Juice WRLD	Business Is Business (Metro's Version)

== See also ==
- Nicki Minaj videography
- List of songs recorded by Nicki Minaj
- List of artists who reached number one on the UK Singles Chart
- List of artists who reached number one in the United States
