= Automatic (Nicki Minaj song) =

Single by Nicki Minaj

from the album Pink Friday: Roman Reloaded
- Released: October 18, 2012
- Studio: Conway Recording Studios (Los Angeles, CA)
- Genre: Europop
- Length: 3:18
- Label: Young Money Entertainment; Cash Money Records
- Songwriters: Onika Maraj; Nader Khayat; Jimmy Thornfield; Geraldo Sandell
- Producers: RedOne; Jimmy Joker

Nicki Minaj singles chronology
"The Boys" (2012)	"Automatic" (2012)	"Va Va Voom" (2012)

"Automatic" is a song recorded by rapper Nicki Minaj, from her second album Pink Friday: Roman Reloaded (2012). It was written by Minaj, along with Nadir Khayat, Jimmy Thornfeldt and Geraldo Sandell, while production was handled by Khayat and Jimmy Joker. A Europop influenced song, "Automatic" features strong elements of dance and electronic music with instrumentation of synthesizers.

On October 18, 2012, it impacted French contemporary hit radio as the fifth single from the album, charting at number 102 on France's SNEP charts. It also charted at number 198 in the UK singles chart. It received mixed reviews from music critics, with most of them rather dismissing the production, lyrical content and composition. The song generated controversy when Lil' Kim accused Nicki of stealing her song of the same name, which was left unreleased.

== Background and composition ==
"Automatic" was written by Maraj, along with RedOne, Jimmy Thornfeldt and Geraldo Sandell, while production was handled by Khayat and Jimmy Joker. The Boston Globe stated that the song "has a spoken-word interlude that sounds suspiciously like the breakdown on 'Vogue' by Minaj's latest cheerleader, Madonna."

Adam Graham of The Detroit News said the song made Minaj sound like a "generic dance-club diva, lost in a sea of pounding bass and EDM flourishes." Slant Magazine said that "Automatic", along with "Starships", "Pound the Alarm", and "Whip It", are "retro-techno-pop earsores comprised of indiscriminately arranged bits of LMFAO's 'Sexy and I Know It', Rihanna's 'We Found Love', and pretty much any recent Britney Spears or Katy Perry song you can name."

== Critical reception ==
"Automatic" received mixed reviews from many music critics. Billboard gave a mixed review, calling it "The musical equivalent to a Prada bag from Chinatown... Minaj sounds so anonymous on this track that if she didn't name-check herself at several points you'd forget it was her song." Spin magazine stated that "The upside is that even when Minaj is dialed to 'mediocre', she's never close to terrible; [Like] on 'Automatic', she does a better (or at least more nuanced) Rihanna than Ri-Ri herself." Fact also commented on the same subject, stating the song sounds "anonymous" and not necessarily like Minaj. Adam Bychawski from Drowned in Sound was negative, stating the song "will make you wish someone would find her darn reset button." Randall Roberts from the Los Angeles Times said the song "could be mistaken for a 15-year-old's first stab at making a dance track on Ableton software, a cynically simple run with clumsy synth chord progressions that were already tired when invented at cheesy 1998 raves." Chris Coplan from Consequence of Sound called the song, along with other songs from the album, "the most utterly useless ballads and club anthems in recent history."

Kyle Anderson from Entertainment Weekly was positive towards the song, but was critical towards its inclusion on the album due to its length. He also stated that along with "Beautiful Sinner"; "It isn't that its bad, it's just that they could have been done by any lesser talent with a tolerance for Auto-Tune." Laurence Green from MusicOMH was more positive, comparing the song to Madonna's MDNA with "fizzy synths contributing to a revved-up Ibiza nights vibe." Kitty Empire from The Observer pointed to "Automatic" as an example of a common "pop-oriented" song in mainstream music, stating that "[Automatic] is an off-the-peg, chart-seeking missile full of rave dynamics." Newsday praised the song and "Fire Burns", but opined that the album consisted of "way too many anonymous dance numbers that could have come from a dozen singers."

== Release and commercial performance ==
In October 2012 it was announced that "Automatic" would be released in France as the single from Pink Friday: Roman Reloaded, alongside another song from the album, "Va Va Voom", as fifth and sixth singles respectively. It entered French national singles chart on week ending on December 22, 2012, at number 200. On week ending on January 26, 2013, it peaked at number 102. It left the chart after sixth week.

Despite not being released as single in the United Kingdom, it peaked at number 198 on Official Singles Company chart following Pink Friday: Roman Reloaded release week.

== Controversy ==
During the interview on Power 105.1 in March 2012, American hip hop artist Lil Kim claimed that an unreleased song, also entitled "Automatic", was recorded three years ago while she was with Cash Money Records, but did not make the final release. Described as a "dance-type of record", she stated "On her [Minaj's] new album Pink Friday: Roman Reloaded, she has a song called ['Automatic'], and the song is so similar to the song that I played for Slim." She felt that her "new sound she brought to the table" was taken by Minaj, and stated that "whether my fans liked that or not, it was my sound." Following Minaj taking her sound, Kim found Minaj "catty" and "obnoxious", but said that she never had a problem with her.

== Live performances ==
The song was included on the setlist of Minaj's Pink Friday: Reloaded Tour.

== Charts ==
Chart (2012–2013)	Peak position
France (SNEP)	102
UK Singles (Official Charts Company)	198

== Release history ==
Release dates for "Automatic"
Country	Date	Format	Ref.
France	October 18, 2012	Contemporary hit radio	
