= Va Va Voom =

2012 song by Nicki Minaj

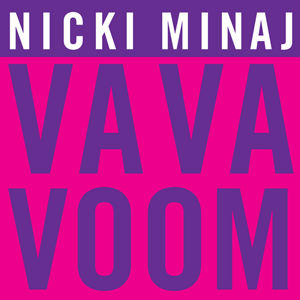

Single by Nicki Minaj

from the album Pink Friday: Roman Reloaded
- Released: October 23, 2012
- Recorded: 2011
- Genre: Dance-pop; electropop
- Length: 3:03
- Label: Young Money; Cash Money; Universal
- Songwriters: Onika Maraj; Lukasz Gottwald; Allan Grigg; Max Martin; Henry Walter
- Producers: Dr. Luke; Kool Kojak; Cirkut

Nicki Minaj singles chronology
"Automatic" (2012)	"Va Va Voom" (2012)	"Beauty and a Beat" (2012)

Music video
- "Va Va Voom (Explicit)" on YouTube

"Va Va Voom" is a song by rapper Nicki Minaj from the deluxe edition of her second studio album, Pink Friday: Roman Reloaded (2012). It was released on October 23, 2012 by Young Money, Cash Money, and Universal Republic as the sixth and final single from the album.

The song was written by Minaj, producers Lukasz Gottwald, Allan Grigg and Henry Walter, and Max Martin. It was planned to serve as the album's lead single, but its release was postponed at the last minute in favor of "Starships". It was sent to UK radio stations on September 15, 2012 and later sent to Top 40 mainstream radio on October 23, 2012. The song is on the deluxe edition of Pink Friday: Roman Reloaded and was later included in the album's reissue, Pink Friday: Roman Reloaded – The Re-Up.

"Va Va Voom" is a dance-pop and electropop song with lyrics about seduction. Upon release, the song received positive reviews from critics. Commercially, it entered the top twenty in several countries including Ireland, Slovakia, New Zealand and the United Kingdom. An accompanying music video was shot in December 2011, but was initially shelved after Minaj decided not to release "Va Va Voom" as the album's lead single, because she was not happy with the video's end result.

== Background ==
"Va Va Voom" was written by Minaj, Lukasz Gottwald, Allan Grigg, Max Martin and Henry Walter, with production by Dr. Luke, Kool Kojak and Cirkut. It was intended to be the lead single from Pink Friday: Roman Reloaded. It was to be solicited to rhythmic contemporary radio stations on February 7, 2012. It was later postponed a week to February 14, 2012, with a release to contemporary hit radio scheduled for the same date. However, Minaj announced that "Starships" would instead be released as the lead single.

On May 24, 2012, a poll was posted on Minaj's website, asking fans to help select the next singles, the poll is divided into three categories, the third category asks to choose the second worldwide pop single, the choices were: "Pound the Alarm", "Whip It", and "Va Va Voom". "Va Va Voom" had the most votes and won the poll. "Whip It" came in second place and "Pound The Alarm" came in third. However, after several radio stations in the UK, France, and Australia started heavily playing "Pound the Alarm", Minaj announced on June 6, 2012, that "Pound The Alarm" has been chosen instead. "Va Va Voom" was eventually solicited to contemporary hit radio in the United States on October 23, 2012.

== Composition ==
Musically, "Va Va Voom" was described as "a sultry, electro-pop thumper" by Digital Spy. Lyrically, the song talks about "seduction finds Minaj playing the temptress atop some delicious dub-lite pulsations." It contains the lyrics "I know that he got a wife at home, but I need just one night alone." The verses of the song are rapped, while the bridge and chorus are sung. "Va Va Voom" is set in common time with a tempo of 127 beats per minute. Written in the key of C minor, it follows the chord progression Cm–E♭–B♭–A♭; Minaj's voice spans from A♭_{3} to B♭_{4}.

== Reception ==
According to MTV's Kara Klenk, "Va Va Voom" remains a "stand out track" on the album, along with "Beautiful Sinner," "Come on a Cone" and "Beez in the Trap." Sarah Crafford of The Sun Chronicle recommended the song to listeners who favored Minaj's pop tracks, complimenting the song as a "catchy, sing-along and soon-to-be hit." Bradley Stern from MuuMuse was said the song was "insanely infectious" and "an unbelievably sickening (in the good way!) pop tune". Sal Cinquemani of Slant Magazine described the song as "the most obvious successor to Minaj's crossover hit "Super Bass"." David Jeffries from AllMusic chose "Va Va Voom" as a standout track on the album.

== Chart performance ==
Following the album's release, "Va Va Voom" sold 46,000 downloads, prompting it to debut at number seventy-nine on the Billboard Hot 100, eventually peaking at number twenty-two. It also debuted on the Canadian Hot 100 at number seventy-four. The song also garnered success across American Billboard charts, charting at number fifty on the Hot Digital Songs chart, 45 on the Hot Canadian Digital Songs chart, fifteen on the Rap Digital Songs, and twenty-one on the Pop Digital Songs. As of December 2014, "Va Va Voom" has sold 1.1 million copies in the United States.

The song debuted at thirty-six on the Australian Singles Chart, where it eventually peaked. It stayed there for two non-consecutive weeks, and stayed in the charts for seven weeks altogether. The song then charted at twenty-nine on the New Zealand Singles Chart and peaked at number twenty, continuing her top twenty peaking success. It stayed in for only eight weeks. The song peaked at six and one on the Belgium Singles Chart (Flanders and Wallonia), respectively and number 34 on the German Singles Chart. In France, the song reached the top ten in French Airplay, at number 8, on November 24, 2012, becoming Minaj's ninth top ten hit in airplay, whom the fourth in solo, after "Super Bass", "Starships" and "Pound The Alarm". Later, "Va Va Voom" peaked at number 54 equally on French Singles Chart, becoming Minaj's twelfth entry in the country. In the UK Singles Chart, the song debuted at number 43, before climbing to number 20 a week later where it stayed there for two consecutive weeks. It spent a total of eight weeks in the top 40. The song debuted at number 37 in the Scottish Singles Chart, before climbing to 20 a week later, spending a total of eight weeks in the top 40. In the Irish Singles Chart, "Va Va Voom" debuted at number 31, before going on to peak at number 13 in its fifth week in the top 40. The song spent nine consecutive weeks in the top 40.

== Music video ==
Minaj's mythical persona is shown in the video.

The music video was filmed on December 21, 2011 in Los Angeles and was directed by Hype Williams. Although during filming Minaj tweeted: "The look were about to shoot, your gonna Spazz", she later expressed her disliking of the end product, but eventually stated that it will be released as a result of the song becoming a single. The music video premiered on October 26, 2012 on E! News.

Gina Serpe from E! News gave the video a positive review, stating: "It's safe to say this video has something for everyone. Starting with Nicki herself looking damn good".

== Live performances ==
Minaj performed "Va Va Voom" live for the first time on television on January 25, 2013 on Jimmy Kimmel Live!.

== Charts ==
=== Weekly charts ===
Chart (2012–2013)	Peak position
Australia (ARIA)	36
Austria (Ö3 Austria Top 40)	53
Belgium (Ultratop 50 Flanders)	6
Belgium (Ultratop Flanders Dance)	32
Belgium (Ultratop Flanders Urban)	21
Belgium (Ultratop 50 Wallonia)	12
Canada Hot 100 (Billboard)	18
Canada CHR/Top 40 (Billboard)	9
Canada Hot AC (Billboard)	33
Czech Republic Airplay (ČNS IFPI)	32
Finland Download (Latauslista)	17
France (SNEP)	54
France Airplay (SNEP)	8
Germany (GfK)	34
Hungary (Rádiós Top 40)	28
Ireland (IRMA)	13
New Zealand (Recorded Music NZ)	20
Scottish Singles Sales (Official Charts)	20
Slovakia Airplay (ČNS IFPI)	19
Switzerland (Schweizer Hitparade)	47
UK Hip Hop/R&B (Official Charts)	3
UK Singles (Official Charts)	20
US Billboard Hot 100	22
US Dance Club Songs (Billboard)	3
US Pop Airplay (Billboard)	13
US Rhythmic Airplay (Billboard)	8

=== Year-end charts ===
Chart (2012)	Position
UK Singles (Official Charts Company)	160

Chart (2013)	Position
Canada (Canadian Hot 100)	92
US Rhythmic (Billboard)	44

== Certifications ==
Certifications for "Va Va Voom"
Region	Certification	Certified units/sales
Australia (ARIA)	2× Platinum	140,000^{‡}
Brazil (Pro-Música Brasil)	Gold	30,000^{‡}
New Zealand (RMNZ)	Platinum	30,000^{‡}
United Kingdom (BPI)	Platinum	600,000^{‡}
United States (RIAA)	2× Platinum	2,000,000^{‡}
^{‡} Sales+streaming figures based on certification alone.

== Radio history ==
Country	Date	Format
United States	October 23, 2012	Mainstream radio
France	November 9, 2012	Mainstream radio
