= Pink Friday: Roman Reloaded =

2012 studio album by Nicki Minaj

- Standard edition cover

Studio album by Nicki Minaj
- Released: April 2, 2012
- Recorded: 2011–March 2012
- Studios: Conway Recording Studios (Los Angeles, CA); Jungle City Studios (New York, NY); The Hit Factory Criteria (Miami, FL); Glenwood Place Studios (Burbank, CA); Kinglet Studios (Stockholm, Sweden); Chalice Studios (Los Angeles, CA); Beluga Heights Studios (Los Angeles, CA); Anchor Recording (Kingston, Jamaica)
- Genres: Hip-hop; dance-pop
- Length: 69:00
- Labels: Cash Money; Universal Republic; Young Money
- Producers: Alex da Kid; Alex P; Pop & Oak; Benny Blanco; BlackOut Movement; Carl Falk; Cirkut; David Guetta; DJ Diamond Kuts; Dreamlab; Dr. Luke; Flip; Hit-Boy; Nikhil S.; RedOne; T-Minus; Jimmy Joker; Kool Kojak

Nicki Minaj album chronology
Pink Friday (2010)	Pink Friday: Roman Reloaded (2012)	Pink Friday: Roman Reloaded – The Re-Up (2012)

Alternative cover
- Deluxe edition cover

Singles from Pink Friday: Roman Reloaded
- 1. "Starships" Released: February 14, 2012; 2. "Right by My Side" Released: March 27, 2012; 3. "Beez in the Trap" Released: May 29, 2012; 4. "Pound the Alarm" Released: June 12, 2012; 5. "Automatic" Released: October 18, 2012; 6. "Va Va Voom" Released: October 23, 2012

Pink Friday: Roman Reloaded (Note: also stylized as Pink Friday ... Roman Reloaded and known as Roman Reloaded) is the second studio album by rapper and singer Nicki Minaj. It was released on April 2, 2012, by Cash Money Records, Universal Republic Records and Young Money Entertainment. Looking to transition from her debut album, Pink Friday (2010), Minaj wanted to make a follow-up record about "just having fun". Stylistically, the album is divided by a first half of hip-hop tracks and a second half of dance-pop songs. As executive producer, Minaj enlisted a variety of collaborators.

Upon its release, Pink Friday: Roman Reloaded received generally mixed reviews from critics, who were ambivalent towards Minaj's exploration of dance-pop. It debuted at number one on the US Billboard 200 selling 253,000 copies in its first week, making it Minaj's second number-one album in the country, and her first to debut at the top of the chart. In November 2024, the album was certified quadruple platinum by the Recording Industry Association of America (RIAA) for moving four million album-equivalent units, becoming Minaj's highest-certified album in the US yet. Internationally, the album peaked at number one in Canada and the United Kingdom, and reached the top five in Australia, Ireland, and New Zealand.

The album was promoted with six singles. Its lead single "Starships" peaked at number five on the US Billboard Hot 100 and was later certified Diamond by the RIAA. Follow-up singles "Right by My Side" and "Beez in the Trap" experienced moderate success on the Hot R&B/Hip-Hop Songs chart. "Pound the Alarm" and "Va Va Voom" peaked at numbers fifteen and twenty-two on the Billboard Hot 100, respectively. "Automatic" was released as a single only in France, where it peaked at number 102 on the SNEP chart. The album was additionally promoted through the Pink Friday Tour and the Pink Friday: Reloaded Tour, which visited North America, Asia, Europe, and Oceania throughout 2012 following the album's release.

The album was reissued in November 2012, as Pink Friday: Roman Reloaded – The Re-Up. In addition to the original album, the reissue includes seven new songs and an additional DVD, which was filmed during the Pink Friday Tour.

== Background and development ==
"April 3 is gonna be a doozy. It's gonna be crazy, it's gonna be important for hip-hop and pop culture. It's gonna be very big."

— Minaj describing the impact she expected the then-forthcoming album to have on the music industry.

Following the success of Minaj's debut studio album, Pink Friday (2010), Cash Money CEO, Brian "Birdman" Williams announced to Billboard that Minaj was aiming for a first quarter release in 2012. In November 2011, Minaj announced on Twitter that the album would be released on February 14, 2012, though it was later rescheduled for release on April 3. The album primarily focuses on Roman Zolanski, one of Minaj's alter egos that was first featured on Pink Friday. The standard artwork was released on March 1, 2012, and the deluxe artwork was revealed on March 8, both through Twitter.

When Minaj was asked on Twitter to describe the album in one word, she tweeted "freedom". In an interview following the premiere of the album's lead single, "Starships", Minaj told Ryan Seacrest, "I've never had this much fun recording music in my life. My first album I was very guarded. I felt like I was making music to please everyone else. I had to be politically correct, but this album I am just creating music, and there's such a big difference. Literally in the studio we were cracking up laughing, having fun, and enjoying ourselves. The music itself you're going to get every side that I've ever shown and then a little bit extra. I've tried to make it very, very balanced, because I don't ever want to be boxed in, and that's always what drives me. So I made a very diverse album." She added that with her first album, "I was a too open Nicki Minaj. It felt more to me like a diary, the songs were more introspective and stuff like that...with this particular album I felt that it was time to give people a moment to enjoy the lyrics, and enjoy the beats, and enjoy the voices. When I was going to do my first album people would say, 'What is she going to talk about? Is she just going to talk about sex?' So I made it my business to make an album that did not talk about sex at all. I made it my business to make an album that wasn't a vulgar album, because [on] my mixtapes I was very, very...outlandish on my mixtapes. With this album I'm going back to not necessarily to that sound, but that feeling. The feeling of 'I don't care what you think!' That's what it is." Minaj also spoke on the concept behind her first two albums, saying: "Sometimes I felt the first album was a little too revealing, too emotional at times, and the other thing about your first album is that you've had all these emotions pent up inside to release and that's what you do on your debut. On the second album I was more concerned about just having fun".

As executive producer, Minaj enlisted a variety of producers, including Alex da Kid, Alex P, Pop & Oak, Benny Blanco, Blackout, Carl Falk, Cirkut, David Guetta, DJ Diamond Kuts, Dreamlab, Dr. Luke, Flip, Hit-Boy, Jimmy Joker, J. R. Rotem, Kane Beatz, Kenoe, KoOol Kojak, M.E. Productions, Pink Friday Productions, Rami Yacoub, RedOne, Rico Beats, Ryan & Smitty, Nikhil S. and T-Minus. Minaj also collaborated with different artists for the album, which includes: Cam'ron, Rick Ross, 2 Chainz, Lil Wayne, Nas, Drake, Young Jeezy, Chris Brown, Bobby V, and Beenie Man.

== Composition ==
Stylistically, Pink Friday: Roman Reloaded is divided into two parts, the first of which focuses mainly on hip-hop tracks while the second contains dance-pop. Minaj raps in her alter ego "Roman Zolanski" in a number of the former's tracks over hard-edged beats and mostly sings on the latter half. The pop songs, categorized Pitchfork's Ryan Dombal, "range from brittle Euro-trance to milquetoast R&B to washed-out balladry". Music critic Kitty Empire cites the song "Pound the Alarm" as a "compromise" between the album's two stylistic halves.

== Promotion ==
=== Singles ===
"Starships" was released as the lead single from the album on February 14, 2012. The song was an international hit, peaking inside the top ten in over fifteen countries. In the United States, the song charted at number five on the Billboard Hot 100. The song is also Minaj's second most certified single to date. "Right by My Side" was sent to US rhythmic radio and US urban radio on March 27, 2012, as the album's second single. The song, which features additional vocals from Chris Brown, has since peaked at number 51 on the Billboard Hot 100. "Beez in the Trap", which features 2 Chainz, was sent to US rhythmic radio on May 29, 2012, as the third single from the album. The song peaked at number 48 on the Billboard Hot 100.

"Pound the Alarm" was released as the fourth single from the album. It was sent to US Top 40/Mainstream radio on July 17, 2012. The song peaked at number 15 on the Billboard Hot 100 as well as in the top ten in other countries including Australia, Canada and the UK. "Automatic" impacted French contemporary hit radio on October 18, 2012 as the fifth single from the album. It peaked at number 102 on France's SNEP chart. "Va Va Voom" was released as the sixth and final single from the album. It was sent to US Top 40/Mainstream radio on October 23, 2012. The song peaked at number 22 on Billboard Hot 100 and in the top 20 in Canada and the UK.

=== Live performances ===
Minaj performed "Roman Holiday" at the 54th Grammy Awards on February 12, 2012, making Minaj the first solo female rapper to perform at the award show. The controversial performance borrowed elements of the classic horror film, The Exorcist (1973). Minaj said in an interview with Rap-Up, "I had this vision for [alter-ego, Roman Zolanski] to be sort of exorcised—or actually he never gets exorcised—but people around him tell him he's not good enough because he's not normal, he's not blending in with the average Joe. And so his mother is scared and the people around him are afraid because they've never seen anything like him. He wanted to show that not only is he amazing and he's sure of himself and confident, but he's never gonna change, he's never gonna be exorcised. Even when they throw the holy water on him, he still rises above." MTV said the performance "was the most elaborate of the night's Grammy performances and had everyone talking."

On February 26, 2012, Minaj performed "Starships" live for the first time along with "Moment 4 Life", "Turn Me On" and "Super Bass" at the 2012 NBA All-Star Game. She also performed "Starships" on the eleventh season of American Idol on March 29, 2012. In April 2012, Minaj held album signings in New York City, Los Angeles, Philadelphia, and London. That month, she traveled to the UK for a week of promotion. On April 4, 2012, she performed a 40-minute mini-concert for BET's 106 & Park. She performed "Starships", "Right by My Side", and "Super Bass" in Times Square, hosted by Nokia, on April 7, 2012. On April 19, 2012, HMV held a competition for fans, where 500 winners would get the chance to meet Minaj in one of their stores in Bayswater, London, where she would sign their albums. Minaj also made an appearance on The Graham Norton Show, which was aired on April 20, 2012, and on that same day, she visited BBC Radio 1 for an interview with Nick Grimshaw.

To further promote Pink Friday: Roman Reloaded, Minaj embarked on her first concert tour, entitled the Pink Friday Tour. The tour comprised 41 show dates, including, 19 in North America, 15 in Europe, 4 in Asia, and 3 in Oceania. The tour began in May 2012 with shows in Australia and Asia. The tour then continued on to Europe and North America in June, July, and August 2012. The tour came to a close on August 14, 2012, in New York City at the Roseland Ballroom. The final show was a part of a free Pepsi promotional concert. The tour was officially announced by Minaj on May 1, 2012, featuring a stage resembling Barbie's Dreamhouse. Minaj stated that she will play radio and outdoor festivals in conduction with arenas and theaters. She described the tour as being "intimate yet big". Laurieann Gibson served as creative director and choreographer for the tour. Minaj also embarked on the Pink Friday: Reloaded Tour, which visited arenas throughout October and December 2012.

=== Reissue ===
On September 6, at the 2012 MTV Video Music Awards, Minaj announced the reissue of Pink Friday: Roman Reloaded. In November, she added that the expanded album would contain an additional disc with seven newly recorded songs and an exclusive behind-the-scenes DVD to supplement the standard edition of the original album. Project, titled Pink Friday: Roman Reloaded - The Re-Up, was released on November 19, seven months after the original record. The new material incorporates hip hop and R&B styles. Upon its release, The Re-Up received generally positive reviews from music critics. Commercially, it helped the original album to return to the top-100 of the Billboard 200 chart, reaching the 27 spot.

== Critical reception ==
Professional ratings
Aggregate scores
Source	Rating
AnyDecentMusic?	5.4/10
Metacritic	60/100
Review scores
Source	Rating
AllMusic	3/5 stars
Entertainment Weekly	B
The Guardian	4/5 stars
The Independent	3/5 stars
MSN Music (Expert Witness)	A−
NME	2.5/5 stars
Pitchfork	6.7/10
Rolling Stone	4/5 stars
Spin	8/10
The Times	2/5 stars

Pink Friday: Roman Reloaded received mixed reviews from critics upon its release. At Metacritic, which assigns a normalized rating out of 100 to reviews from mainstream publications, the album received an average score of 60, based on 30 reviews. Although he complimented its first half as "an amusement park for production lovers", AllMusic editor David Jeffries criticized the album's "iffy pop" and called it "a frustrating mix of significant and skippable." Randall Roberts of the Los Angeles Times complimented its "minimal and bouncy hip-hop tracks" for highlighting Minaj's "charm and achievement", but wrote that the "disjointed, artistically confused" album "drives off a cliff" with "dance pop songs as simple as they are generic". Emily Mackay of NME found its disparate music "just baffling" and "zany for the sake of it". Kitty Empire, writing in The Observer, interpreted Minaj's pop songs as "an aggressive bid for Gaga's territory." David Amidon of PopMatters accused Minaj of "doubling down on her cartoonish elements" and criticized its first half as "very poorly thought out rap music masquerading as pop". John Calvert of The Quietus described the album as "pop postmodernity in an advanced state of hollow, banal meaningless[ness]" and felt that the pop songs have "absolutely nothing to do with Minaj's art". Slant Magazine's Matthew Cole panned it as a "mediocre rap album" and felt that "Minaj conveys no personality" when she does not rap. "Too many of its 19 tracks leave Minaj simply treading the territory of other radio divas", wrote Kyle Anderson in Entertainment Weekly.

In a positive review for Rolling Stone, journalist Jody Rosen called it a "filler-free mega-pop album" and stated that "the energy never flags". Jessica Hopper of Spin praised Minaj's "rap offerings" as "nearly flawless" and wrote of the album's portion of pop tracks, "Her artistic potency dissolves, and she's just another well-finessed quirky diva". Tom Ewing of The Guardian said that it "doesn't matter" that the album is inconsistent and "makes no attempt to marry its rap and pop impulses ... at their best the styles are wedded anyway by a particular frenzy, a sense that Minaj comes with no off switch or lower gear." Robert Christgau said in his review for MSN Music that Minaj "raps exceptionally well, sings quite well, rhymes inconsistently but sometimes superbly", and that the album's deluxe edition starts and ends "strong", with a "fun" middle that veers between "mawkish and loud". Christgau recommended it to listeners who "enjoy contemporary pop whose market-tested blare offends both rockist philistines and IDM aesthetes".

== Accolades ==
Awards
Year	Ceremony	Category	Result	Ref.
2013	Billboard Music Awards	Top Rap Album	Won	

== Commercial performance ==
Pink Friday: Roman Reloaded debuted at number one on the US Billboard 200 chart, selling 253,000 copies in its first week, ending April 8, 2012. This marked Minaj's second number-one album in that country following her previous studio album, Pink Friday (2010), which peaked at number one in February 2011. On June 22, 2012, Pink Friday: Roman Reloaded was certified platinum by the Recording Industry Association of America (RIAA), for shipments of one million copies in the US. The album sold 785,000 copies throughout 2012 in the US. Pink Friday: Roman Reloaded was the best-selling rap album released in 2012 in the US, and overall the album was the third highest-selling R&B/Hip-Hop album of 2012 in the US. According to the International Federation of the Phonographic Industry (IFPI), Pink Friday: Roman Reloaded was the 25th best-selling album globally of 2012, with sales of 1.4 million copies worldwide during that year. As of February 2015, Pink Friday: Roman Reloaded has sold over 905,000 copies in the US. On November 18, 2024, the album was certified quadruple platinum by the RIAA for combined album sales, track sales, on-demand audio, and video streams equivalent of four million album-equivalent units.

Pink Friday: Roman Reloaded debuted at number one on the UK Albums Chart and the UK R&B Albums Chart, with first week sales of 47,000 copies. In doing so, Pink Friday: Roman Reloaded became the first album by a female rap artist to chart at number one in the United Kingdom. Additionally, the album sold 242,000 copies in the UK throughout 2012, making it the thirty-seventh best selling album of that year. Pink Friday: Roman Reloaded also debuted at number one on the Canadian Albums Chart, and debuted at number five on the Australian Albums Chart. In Mexico, the album reached the top 40 in its first week of release.

== Track listing ==
Pink Friday: Roman Reloaded track listing
No.	Title	Writer(s)	Producer(s)	Length
1.	"Roman Holiday"	Onika Maraj; Winston Thomas; L. Nacht; Safaree Samuels	Blackout Movement	4:05
2.	"Come on a Cone"	Maraj; Chauncey Hollis	Hit-Boy	3:05
3.	"I Am Your Leader" (featuring Cam'ron and Rick Ross)	Maraj; Hollis; William Roberts; Cameron Giles	Hit-Boy	3:33
4.	"Beez in the Trap" (featuring 2 Chainz)	Maraj; M. Jordan; Tauheed Epps	Kenoe	4:28
5.	"HOV Lane"	Maraj; Ryan Marrone	Ryan & Smitty	3:13
6.	"Roman Reloaded" (featuring Lil Wayne)	Maraj; Dwayne Carter, Jr.; Ricardo LaMarre; Samuels	Rico Beats	3:16
7.	"Champion" (featuring Nas, Drake and Young Jeezy)	Maraj; Tyler Williams; Nikhil Seetharam; Aubrey Graham; Jay Jenkins; Nasir Jones	T-Minus	4:56
8.	"Right by My Side" (featuring Chris Brown)	Maraj; Warren "Oak" Felder; Andrew "Pop" Wansel; Ester Dean; J. Roberts; J. Thomas; Ronald Colson	Pop & Oak	4:25
9.	"Sex in the Lounge" (featuring Lil Wayne and Bobby V)	Maraj; Ernest Wilson; Matthew Hall; Carter; Bobby Wilson; Samuels	M.E. Productions	3:27
10.	"Starships"	Maraj; Nadir Khayat; Carl Falk; Rami Yacoub; Wayne Hector	RedOne; Rami; Falk	3:30
11.	"Pound the Alarm"	Maraj; Khayat; Falk; Yacoub; Bilal Hajji; Achraf Jannusi	RedOne; Falk; Rami	3:25
12.	"Whip It"	Maraj; Khayat; Alex Papaconstantinou; Björn Djupström; Hajji; Hector	RedOne; Alex P	3:15
13.	"Automatic"	Maraj; Khayat; Jimmy Thornfeldt; Geraldo Sandell	RedOne; Jimmy Joker	3:18
14.	"Beautiful Sinner"	Maraj; Alexander Grant; Ester Dean	Alex da Kid	3:47
15.	"Marilyn Monroe"	Maraj; Daniel James; Leah Haywood; Ross Golan; J.R. Rotem	J.R. Rotem; Dreamlab	3:16
16.	"Young Forever"	Maraj; Lukasz Gottwald; Kelly Sheehan; Henry Walter	Dr. Luke; Cirkut	3:06
17.	"Fire Burns"	Maraj; Wansel; Felder	Pop & Oak	3:00
18.	"Gun Shot" (featuring Beenie Man)	Maraj; D. Johnson; M. Davis; C. Grossett	Kane Beatz	4:39
19.	"Stupid Hoe"	Maraj; Tina Dunham; Samuels	DJ Diamond Kuts	3:16
Total length:				69:00

Deluxe edition bonus tracks
No.	Title	Writer(s)	Producer(s)	Length
20.	"Turn Me On" (David Guetta featuring Nicki Minaj)	Maraj; David Guetta; Giorgio Tuinfort; Dean	David Guetta; Tuinfort; Black Raw	3:19
21.	"Va Va Voom"	Maraj; Gottwald; Allan Grigg; Max Martin; Walter	Dr. Luke; Kool Kojak; Cirkut	3:03
22.	"Masquerade"	Maraj; Gottwald; Benjamin Levin; Martin; Walter	Dr. Luke; Benny Blanco; Cirkut	3:48
Total length:				79:10

2023 LP deluxe edition reissue bonus tracks
No.	Title	Writer(s)	Producer(s)	Length
20.	"Va Va Voom"	Maraj; Gottwald; Grigg; Martin; Walter	Dr. Luke; Kool Kojak; Cirkut	3:03
21.	"Masquerade"	Maraj; Gottwald; Levin; Martin; Walter	Dr. Luke; Benny Blanco; Cirkut	3:48
22.	"Up in Flames"	Maraj; Matthew Samuels; Zale Epstein; Stephen Kozmeniuk; Brett Kruger	Boi-1da; The Maven Boys	5:05
23.	"Freedom"	Maraj; Samuels; Matthew Burnett	Boi-1da; Burnett	4:47
24.	"Hell Yeah" (featuring Parker)	Maraj; Parker Ighile	Parker Ighile	4:11
25.	"High School" (featuring Lil Wayne)	Maraj; Carter, Jr.	Boi-1da; T-Minus	3:37
26.	"I'm Legit" (featuring Ciara)	Maraj; Dean; Melvin Hough II; Keith Thomas; Rivelino Wouter	Mel & Mus	3:18
27.	"I Endorse These Strippers" (featuring Tyga and Brinx)	Maraj; Michael "Crazy Mike" Foster; Jawara Headley; Jordan Houston; Michael Stevenson	Juicy J; Crazy Mike	4:22
28.	"The Boys" (with Cassie)	Maraj; Jonas Jeberg; Jean Baptiste; Lillianna Saldaña; Anjulie Persaud	Jeberg; Baptiste	4:08
Total length:				105:18

Notes

- The iTunes Store and Apple Music editions of Pink Friday: Roman Reloaded include a twenty-one minute three second recorded interview titled "Press Conference" with Minaj, Charlamagne the God and Safaree "SB" Samuels as a bonus track.
- The Australasian, UK, Japanese and Latin American editions include the bonus tracks "Va Va Voom", and "Masquerade".
- All tracks, except "Masquerade", of the 2023 deluxe edition reissue are also part of The Re-Up edition.

== Personnel ==
Credits adapted from the liner notes of Pink Friday: Roman Reloaded.

- Nicki Minaj – executive producer
- Martin Sandberg – vocals
- Carl Falk – guitar, producer, vocals, mixing, instrumentation
- Wayne Hector – vocals
- Jeanette Olsson – background vocals
- Ariel Chobaz – engineer, vocal editing, vocal producer, mixing
- RedOne – background vocals, producer, instrumentation, vocal editing
- Marissa Bregman – vocals
- Rachael Findlen – vocals
- Patrizia Valentina – vocals
- Eve Boase – vocals
- Kalenna Harper – vocals
- Kelly Sheehan – vocals
- Teddy Sky – vocals (Background)
- Rutger "Ruffi" Kroese – vocal mixing
- Bilal "The Chef" Hajji – background vocals
- AJ Junior – background vocals
- Mohombi – vocals
- Joshua Berkman – A&R coordinator
- Dwayne "Tha President" Carter – executive producer
- David Levy – engineer
- Finis "KY" – white engineer
- Koool – Kojak programming, producer, instrumentation
- Rami – producer, mixing, instrumentation, vocal editing
- Noah Shebib – engineer
- Alex da Kid – producer
- Gelly Kusuma – engineer
- Alex P – producer, engineer, vocal editing, instrumentation
- Brian "Big Bass" Gardner – mastering
- Donald "Tixie" Dixon – engineer
- Stuart White – engineer
- T-Minus – producer
- Ronald "Slim Tha Don" Williams – executive producer
- Donnie Meadows – production coordination
- Michael "Banger" Cadahia – engineer
- Elizabeth Gallardo – recording assistant
- Bryan "Baby Birdman" Williams – executive producer
- Trevor Muzzy – engineer, mixing, vocal editing
- Noel Cadastre – recording assistant
- Cortez Bryant – executive producer
- Josh Thomas – producer, writer
- Black Raw – mastering, mixing, additional production
- Safaree "SB" Samuels – executive producer, A&R coordinator
- Pop Wansel – producer
- Rico Beats – producer
- Clint Gibbs – recording assistant
- Smitty – producer
- Kidus "K Duece" Henok – A&R coordinator
- Lukasz Gottwald – vocals
- Jimmy Joker – producer, instrumentation
- Katie Mitzell – production coordination
- Cirkut – programming, instrumentation, producer
- Scott "Yarmov" Yarmovsky – production coordination
- Jermaine Preyan – executive producer
- Ryan – producer
- Jon Sher – mixing assistant, recording assistant
- Jahshari Wilson – cover design
- JusIce Beatz – producer
- Nikhil Seethram – producer
- JProof – producer
- Flippa123 – producer
- DJ Diamond Kuts – producer
- Tim Roberts – mixing assistant
- Serban Ghenea – mixing
- John Rivers – engineer
- Kane – producer
- Benny Blanco – programming, producer, instrumentation
- Blackout – producer
- Hype Williams – photography
- Ke'Noe – producer
- Dr. Luke – programming, producer, instrumentation
- David Guetta – producer
- Phil Seaford – mixing assistant
- Nicholas Cooper – vocal producer
- Tanisha Broadwater – production coordination
- J.R. Rotem – producer
- Irene Richter – production coordination
- Giorgio Tuinfort – producer
- Dream – lab producer
- Hit Boy – producer

== Charts ==
=== Weekly charts ===
Weekly chart performance for Pink Friday: Roman Reloaded
Chart (2012)	Peak position
Australian Albums (ARIA)	5
Australian Urban Albums (ARIA)	2
Austrian Albums (Ö3 Austria)	49
Belgian Albums (Ultratop Flanders)	23
Belgian Albums (Ultratop Wallonia)	35
Canadian Albums (Billboard)	1
Danish Albums (Hitlisten)	25
Dutch Albums (Album Top 100)	24
Finnish Albums (Suomen virallinen lista)	48
French Albums (SNEP)	20
German Albums (Offizielle Top 100)	44
Greek Albums (IFPI)	32
Irish Albums (IRMA)	2
Italian Albums (FIMI)	66
Japanese Albums (Oricon)	6
Mexican Albums (AMPROFON)	39
New Zealand Albums (RMNZ)	3
Norwegian Albums (VG-lista)	9
Scottish Albums (OCC)	1
South Korean Albums (Circle)	78
South Korean International Albums (Circle)	14
Spanish Albums (PROMUSICAE)	60
Swedish Albums (Sverigetopplistan)	37
Swiss Albums (Schweizer Hitparade)	24
Taiwan International Albums (G-Music)	3
UK Albums (Official Charts)	1
UK R&B Albums (Official Charts)	1
US Billboard 200	1
US Top Rap Albums (Billboard)	1
US Top R&B/Hip-Hop Albums (Billboard)	1

=== Year-end charts ===
2012 year-end chart performance for Pink Friday: Roman Reloaded
Chart (2012)	Position
Australian Albums (ARIA) Pink Friday: Roman Reloaded – The Re-Up	48
Australian Hip Hop/R&B Albums (ARIA) Pink Friday: Roman Reloaded – The Re-Up	4
Canadian Albums (Billboard)	45
French Albums (SNEP)	132
New Zealand Albums (RMNZ) Pink Friday: Roman Reloaded – The Re-Up	42
UK Albums (Official Charts)	37
US Billboard 200	26
US Top R&B/Hip-Hop Albums (Billboard)	3
Worldwide Albums (IFPI)	25

2013 year-end chart performance for Pink Friday: Roman Reloaded
Chart (2013)	Position
US Billboard 200	185
US Top R&B/Hip-Hop Albums (Billboard)	32

== Certifications and sales ==
Certifications and sales for Pink Friday: Roman Reloaded
Region	Certification	Certified units/sales
Australia (ARIA) for Pink Friday: Roman Reloaded – The Re-Up	Gold	35,000^{^}
Denmark (IFPI Danmark)	Gold	10,000^{‡}
Ireland (IRMA)	Platinum	15,000^{^}
New Zealand (RMNZ) for Pink Friday: Roman Reloaded – The Re-Up	Platinum	15,000^{‡}
Poland (ZPAV)	Gold	10,000^{*}
Sweden (GLF)	Gold	20,000^{‡}
United Kingdom (BPI)	Platinum	300,000^{‡}
United States (RIAA)	4× Platinum	4,000,000^{‡}
Summaries
Worldwide	—	1,400,000
^{*} Sales figures based on certification alone.^{^} Shipments figures based on certification alone.^{‡} Sales+streaming figures based on certification alone.

== Release history ==
Regions	Dates	Format(s)	Label(s)
Germany	April 2, 2012	CD, digital download, LP	Universal Music, Cash Money
United Kingdom	April 2, 2012	CD, digital download, LP	Universal Island, Cash Money
France	April 2, 2012	CD, digital download, LP	Universal Music, Cash Money
Australia	April 2, 2012	CD, digital download, LP	Universal Music, Cash Money
United States	April 3, 2012	CD, digital download, LP	Universal Music, Young Money, Cash Money
Canada	April 3, 2012	CD, digital download, LP	Universal Music, Young Money, Cash Money
Japan	April 11, 2012	CD, digital download, LP	Universal Music Japan, Cash Money
Brazil	April 23, 2012	CD, digital download, LP	Universal Music, Cash Money
China	April 23, 2012	CD, digital download, LP	Universal Music, Cash Money
Denmark	April 23, 2012	CD, digital download, LP	Universal Music, Cash Money
New Zealand	April 23, 2012	CD, digital download, LP	Universal Music, Cash Money
Netherlands	April 23, 2012	CD, digital download, LP	Universal Music, Cash Money
