= Pound the Alarm =

2012 single by Nicki Minaj

Single by Nicki Minaj

from the album Pink Friday: Roman Reloaded
- Released: June 12, 2012
- Recorded: 2011
- Studio: Conway Recording Studios (Los Angeles, CA)
- Genre: EDM; electropop; Eurodance; techno
- Length: 3:25
- Label: Young Money; Cash Money; Universal Republic
- Songwriters: Onika Maraj; RedOne; Carl Falk; Rami Yacoub; Bilal Hajji; Achraf Jannusi
- Lyricists: Onika Maraj, Bilal Hajji, Achraf "AJ Junior" Janussi, Rami Yacoub, Carl Falk, RedOne
- Producers: RedOne; Falk; Yacoub

Nicki Minaj singles chronology
"Get Low" (2012)	"Pound the Alarm" (2012)	"Out of My Mind" (2012)

Music video
- "Pound the Alarm (Explicit)" on YouTube

"Pound the Alarm" is a song by rapper and singer Nicki Minaj. It was released on June 12, 2012, by Young Money, Cash Money, and Universal Republic as the fourth single from her second album, Pink Friday: Roman Reloaded (2012). The song was written by RedOne, Carl Falk, Rami Yacoub, Bilal Hajji, and Achraf Jannusi, with co-writing credits from Minaj, and production was handled by RedOne, Falk, and Yacoub. Despite the song not winning the poll where Minaj and her label asked fans to pick the next single from her album, the label went ahead and released "Pound the Alarm" due to a large number of airplay requests for the song.

Musically, "Pound the Alarm" is a techno song that talks about having a good time and partying all night, as well as going to festivals/carnivals as the music video portrays. The song reached the top ten in Australia, Canada, Finland, Ireland, Israel, New Zealand, and the United Kingdom and in top twenty in Mexico and France. In the United States, the song peaked at number 15 on the Billboard Hot 100, and number one on the US Hot Dance Club Songs chart.

The accompanying music video was shot in her native birth country, Trinidad and Tobago, and features Minaj performing at a national Trinidad and Tobago Carnival as well as dancing from locals of the country. The music video received positive reviews, with many enjoying the fun atmosphere. The song was featured on Minaj's Pink Friday: Reloaded Tour. The song is included in the game Just Dance 2014. It is also one of the select songs available on the demo version.

== Background ==
On May 24, 2012, a poll was posted on Minaj's official website asking the fans to choose the next single(s). The poll is divided into three categories. The third and final category asks to choose between "Pound the Alarm", "Whip It", and "Va Va Voom". "Va Va Voom" had the most votes and won the poll. "Whip It" came in second and "Pound the Alarm" came in third. After the poll results were finalized, a fan then told Minaj; "ΝΟΟΟ!! Pound The Alarm is way more energetic!!!", where Minaj replied: "I agree!!!! Fun2perform. But the polls don't lie do they?"." The song was eventually trending on Twitter for the choice of the songs. Moments later she tweeted: "Oop. Just got word that radio 1 in the uk and nova & 2day fm in australia are runnin w/ #poundthealarm due to the amount of requests" and later added after "Sorry va va voomers...Looks like France has chosen #poundthealarm for the win as well barbz."

Minaj confirmed on Twitter on June 6, 2012, that she chose "Pound the Alarm" as the next single instead of "Va Va Voom" owing to the number of radio requests "Pound the Alarm" was getting in the UK, Australia, and France. It officially impacted Australian radio on June 12, 2012, where it was the most added track of the week. It also impacted UK radio on June 15, 2012. In the United States, the song was released as the second mainstream single and fourth single overall from the album on July 17, 2012.

== Composition ==
"Pound the Alarm" is a Techno song produced by RedOne, Falk, and Rami. It is composed in common time in the key of C♯ minor with a tempo of 125 beats per minute. It moves in common time and follows a chord progression of C♯m–G♯m–A–B, and Nicki's vocals span from B_{3} to A_{4}. The song makes use of EDM, techno and electro in its composition, while also being influenced by rave. After each chorus there is a "frantic" Eurodance and dubstep breakdown, and also features the sounds of alarms, which were sampled from American artist Britney Spears from her 2000 single "Stronger", weaving beats, and "seize-the-night" lyrics.

Lyrically, it talks about having a good time and partying. However, in one of the verses, she warns her lover by saying, "I'm a bad bitch, no muzzle", meaning that whilst muzzles prevent dogs from barking, nobody can stop her from saying what she wants to say, as she is a 'bad bitch'. When the song received mixed reception from critics with it being too similar, RedOne, who produced both the song and "Starships" told MTV News that "Pound the Alarm" is sonically edgier. "It's got the pop element, but it's got some hard-core elements, some dance underground elements." Laurence Green from MusicOMH compared the song to 2 Unlimited by saying "The techno push of 'Pound the Alarm' comes on like [2 Unlimited] set loose in the studio [...]". Kitty Empire from The Observer described the song as firmly a "half-rap, half-pop" song.

== Critical reception ==
Entertainment Weekly gave a positive review by describing the song as "The perfect trunk rattler to blast from your pink Barbie Bentley, with booming synths that build to a brain-numbing epiphany: 'Music. Makes Me. High.'" Slant Magazine stated that "Pound the Alarm", along with "Starships", "Whip It", and "Automatic", are "retro-techno-pop earsores comprised of indiscriminately arranged bits of LMFAO's 'Sexy and I Know It', Rihanna's 'We Found Love', and pretty much any recent Britney Spears or Katy Perry song you can name", adding that "Her repeated exhortation on 'Pound the Alarm' to get things 'hotter and hotter and sexy and hotter' is about as weak as club-jam come-ons get." Fact gave it a positive review, saying "its avalanche-force hoover noises are so over-the-top and its hooks so catchy that you may as well save time and cave into it now."

Kitty Empire from The Observer said the song makes the album "a persuasive compromise between this album's chart fodder and its rap turf." Andrew Unterberger of Popdust gave the song a mixed review, and compared it to the works of Jennifer Lopez, Taio Cruz, The Black Eyed Peas, and Beyoncé. Billboard editor Andrew Hampp gave the song a negative review, stating that it is a "'Starships' sound-alike" and saying the only difference is that "Nicki does a little bit more singing than she does on her current single, but otherwise the two tracks are virtually indistinguishable. Even the chorus is a rewrite." Emily Mackay from NME said the song was a "charmless trancey ba[n]ger" and categorised it as a part of the album that "flipflops". Drowned in Sound called the song "trashy electro [music]", opining that when it "commands you in its over-the-top robo-female voice to do as the song title asks, you almost feel obliged to comply."

== Commercial performance ==
"Pound the Alarm" debuted at 92 and peaked at number 15 on the US Billboard Hot 100 and peaked at number fourteen on the US Pop Songs. The song also peaked at number one on Hot Dance Club Songs. The song managed to peak inside the top ten in Canada, peaking at number nine on the charts.

The song also managed to have success in the Oceanic regions. In Australia, the song debuted at number thirty-three, until the next week it peaked at number ten for two non-consecutive weeks. It was eventually certified 2× Platinum by Australian Recording Industry Association (ARIA) for sales of 70,000. In New Zealand, the song debuted at twelve, until the next week it peaked at number six for two consecutive weeks. The song was then certified Gold by Recording Industry Association of New Zealand for sales of 7,500.

The song was also very successful in European regions. In the United Kingdom, the song debuted at seventy-nine until it fell out; it later re-entered at number sixty-one and peaked at number eight. The song also marks Minaj's third solo top ten entry in the UK, following "Super Bass" and "Starships". In France, the song debuted at 137, until it rose to number 52. "Pound the Alarm" later re-entered at 59, peaking at nineteen. In Finland, the song debuted at fourteen and peaked at number four. In Belgium (Flanders and Wallonia), the song debuted at 41 and 43, reaching numbers fourteen and thirty-one, respectively (for two consecutive weeks). The song debuted at 86 on the Dutch Top 40 and peaked at number 30 on the chart; it further debuted and peaked at number 23 in Denmark. In Switzerland, the song debuted at number 52 and peaked at number 44. It peaked at number eight in Scotland as well.

== Music video ==
The video was shot in Trinidad at Queen's Park Savannah on July 4, 2012, and had what was seen to be a carnival theme. Open auditions were held for the video on-set. 500 people were scheduled to appear in the music video and were asked to come wearing carnival attire. Director Benny Boom, who filmed Minaj's "Beez in the Trap" and "Right by My Side" videos, also directed the "Pound the Alarm" video. Minaj released a 'behind the scenes' video of the shoot on July 13, 2012. It premiered on Minaj's VEVO account on Tuesday, July 31, 2012.

=== Synopsis ===
Minaj dresses in carnival attire throughout the video.

The video for "Pound the Alarm" begins with Minaj on a building, singing and looking over the city. She pays tribute to Trinidad and Tobago, her birthplace, and the Trinidad and Tobago Carnival. The video opens with a steelpan version of the song, and shots of different locations in Port of Spain. Then the flag of Trinidad and Tobago appears before Minaj is shown standing in a bird eye view of Port of Spain. Minaj is wearing a custom-made Trinidadian flag-themed bra and high-rise panties. She then is seen walking down an alleyway in a red carnival costume, joined by other women in the same Trinbagonian carnival attire, they are seen partying and dancing to the song. In this scene, Minaj has a large feathered headdress on. Minaj is then seen onstage holding a concert with Trinidadian artistes: Machel Montano, Bunji Garlin and Fay-Ann Lyons, while confetti comes down and the audience throw up the Trinidadian flag. Many Trinidadian carnival characters appear in the video such as Dame Lorraine, Blue Devil, Jab Jab, Moko Jumbies (people walking on stilts), and others. Towards the end of the video, Minaj is sitting on top of a stereo speaker, while fireworks appear in the night sky. Minaj forms a conga line and does some choreography with her backup dancers. Minaj and other women are dancing sensually on each other; the local term for this dance is called "wining". Towards the end of the video Minaj is seen in front of her cousins from Trinidad, and wrapping a Trinidadian bandanna around her mouth. The video ends with Minaj walking towards a bright light still dressed in Carnival attire.

Of the video, Romeo's Corner said "Other than being a very colorful video and the beautiful Trinidad as its backdrop, I don't see how this video could do anything with 'Pound the Alarm' other than having fun."

== Live performances and other usages ==
Minaj performed "Pound the Alarm" live during Radio 1's Hackney Weekend on June 23, 2012, as part of the line-up on the main stage. Minaj performed the song on The Tonight Show with Jay Leno on July 13, 2012. The song was also included on Minaj's Pink Friday Tour and her Pink Friday: Reloaded Tour. She also performed the song on Today, along with "Starships" and "I Am Your Leader".

The song is featured in the fourth episode of the tenth season of RuPaul's Drag Race. At the end of the episode, the bottom two contestants, Dusty Ray Bottoms and Monét X Change, had to lip sync to the song to avoid elimination, with Bottoms being the loser. The song is also sampled in the song "Sissy That Walk" by RuPaul.

== Track listing ==
- Digital download
1. "Pound the Alarm" – 3:21
2. "Pound the Alarm" (music video) – 4:05
- Digital download EP
1. "Pound the Alarm" (Liam Keegan Mix) – 4:42
2. "Pound the Alarm" (Nicole Chen Mix) – 5:43
3. "Pound the Alarm" (Nick Lees Mix) – 5:51
4. "Pound the Alarm" (Jelfa Mix) – 5:27
5. "Pound the Alarm" (Kitz Looper Mix) – 5:25
- US CD single
1. "Pound the Alarm" (Liam Keegan Mix) – 4:42
2. "Pound the Alarm" (Nicole Chen Mix) – 5:43
3. "Pound the Alarm" (Nick Lees Mix) – 5:51
4. "Pound the Alarm" (Jelfa Mix) – 5:27
5. "Pound the Alarm" (Kitz Looper Mix) – 5:25

== Credits and personnel ==
Recording

- Recorded at Conway Recording Studios, Hollywood, California, United States
- Mixed at Conway Recording Studios

Personnel

- Nicki Minaj – songwriter, vocals
- RedOne – songwriter, producer, backing vocals, instruments
- Carl Falk – songwriter, producer, mixing, instruments
- Rami Yacoub – songwriter, producer, mixing, instruments
- Bilal Hajji – songwriter, backing vocals
- Achraf Jannusi – songwriter, backing vocals
- Trevor Muzzy – recording, mixing, vocal editing
- Ariel Chobaz – recording
- Jon Sher – recording assistant
- Jeanette Olsson – backing vocals

== Charts and certifications ==
=== Weekly charts ===
Chart (2012)	Peak position
Australia (ARIA)	10
Belgium (Ultratop 50 Flanders)	14
Belgium Dance (Ultratop Flanders)	15
Belgium Urban (Ultratop Flanders)	3
Belgium (Ultratop 50 Wallonia)	30
Belgium Dance (Ultratop Wallonia)	3
Canada (Canadian Hot 100)	8
Canada CHR/Top 40 (Billboard)	6
Canada Hot AC (Billboard)	33
Denmark (Tracklisten)	23
Finland (Suomen virallinen lista)	4
France (SNEP)	19
Germany (GfK)	82
Hungary (Rádiós Top 40)	35
Ireland (IRMA)	8
Israel International Airplay (Media Forest)	10
Italy (FIMI)	82
Japan Hot 100 (Billboard)	62
Mexico (Billboard Mexican Airplay)	17
Netherlands (Single Top 100)	30
Netherlands (Dutch Top 40)	34
New Zealand (Recorded Music NZ)	6
Scottish Singles Sales (Official Charts)	5
Sweden (Sverigetopplistan)	33
Switzerland (Schweizer Hitparade)	44
UK Singles (Official Charts)	8
US Billboard Hot 100	15
US Dance Club Songs (Billboard)	1
US Dance Airplay (Billboard)	4
US Pop Airplay (Billboard)	13
US Rhythmic Airplay (Billboard)	3

=== Year-end charts ===
Chart (2012)	Position
Australia (ARIA)	87
Australia Urban (ARIA)	27
Belgium Urban (Ultratop Flanders)	33
Belgium Dance (Ultratop Wallonia)	38
Canada (Canadian Hot 100)	58
France (SNEP)	118
UK Singles (OCC)	62
US Billboard Hot 100	75
US Dance Club Songs (Billboard)	4
US Dance/Mix Show Airplay (Billboard)	35
US Rhythmic (Billboard)	36

=== Certifications ===
Region	Certification	Certified units/sales
Australia (ARIA)	3× Platinum	210,000^{‡}
Brazil (Pro-Música Brasil)	Platinum	60,000^{‡}
New Zealand (RMNZ)	Gold	7,500^{*}
Norway (IFPI Norway)	Platinum	10,000^{‡}
United Kingdom (BPI)	Platinum	600,000^{‡}
United States (RIAA)	2× Platinum	2,000,000^{‡}
Streaming
Denmark (IFPI Danmark)	Gold	900,000^{†}
^{*} Sales figures based on certification alone.^{‡} Sales+streaming figures based on certification alone.^{†} Streaming-only figures based on certification alone.

== Release history ==
Region	Date	Format
Australia	June 12, 2012	Mainstream radio
United Kingdom	June 15, 2012	Mainstream radio
United States	July 17, 2012	Top 40/Mainstream radio
United States	July 31, 2012	Rhythmic radio

== See also ==
- List of number-one dance singles of 2012 (U.S.)
