= Starships (song) =

2012 single by Nicki Minaj

Single by Nicki Minaj

from the album Pink Friday: Roman Reloaded
- B-side: "Stupid Hoe"
- Released: February 14, 2012
- Recorded: November 2011
- Studio: Conway; Kinglet
- Genre: Dance-pop; techno-pop; Europop; trance rap; electropop
- Length: 3:31
- Label: Young Money; Cash Money; Universal Republic
- Songwriters: Onika Maraj; Nadir Khayat; Carl Falk; Rami Yacoub; Wayne Hector
- Producers: RedOne; Rami Yacoub; Carl Falk

Nicki Minaj singles chronology
| "Give Me All Your Luvin'" (2012) | "Starships" (2012) | "Right by My Side" (2012) |

Music video
- "Starships" on YouTube

"Starships" is a song by Trinidadian rapper Nicki Minaj from her second studio album, Pink Friday: Roman Reloaded (2012). It was released as the album's lead single on February 14, 2012, by Young Money, Cash Money, and Universal Republic. The song was written by Minaj and RedOne Productions' producers RedOne, Carl Falk, and Rami Yacoub, with additional writing by Wayne Hector. Reception to "Starships" was mixed; some music critics praised the catchy production, while others deemed the song itself generic.

"Starships" reached number one in Honduras and the top ten in fourteen other countries. It also reached number five on the U.S. Billboard Hot 100 and spent a total of 21 consecutive weeks in the top ten. As of 2014, the song has sold 4.5 million digital downloads in the U.S. It is certified diamond by the RIAA, becoming her second-highest certified solo single in the U.S. It is also certified diamond in Australia. The song is among the best-selling singles of all time worldwide, with 7.2 million copies sold as of 2012.

The music video was shot on the island of Oahu in Hawaii and was directed by Anthony Mandler. It won Best Female Video at the 2012 MTV Video Music Awards. The song was included in the 2012 video game Dance Central 3 and the best-selling video game Just Dance 2014. Minaj later expressed disliking the song, and even regretted releasing it.

== Composition and musical style ==
Nicki Minaj co-wrote "Starships" with its producers Nadir "RedOne" Khayat, Carl Falk, and Rami Yacoub, with additional writing from Wayne Hector and Bilal "The Chef" Hajji. In 2011, a demo version of "Starships", sung by Mohombi, was given to Minaj, who personalized the verses to make it sound "more her style", while keeping the chorus. Minaj's vocals were recorded at Conway Studios in Los Angeles. Trevor Muzzy described the vocal recording process:

"All Nicki's vocal tracking was done at Conway Studios in LA, where she had a lockout and was working with her engineer, Ariel Chobaz. I did not want to assume that how he was recording her wasn't working, so I asked him what he had set up, and he told me that there were two vocal signal chains, one being a Telefunken ELAM 251 going into a Chandler TG2 mic pre and then through an Urei 1176 [compressor]. The other was a more traditional Neumann-Neve chain. The 251 chain sounded amazing and worked really well with the 1176, which I don't typically use for cutting vocals. It gave her voice a unique character with a cool edge that wasn't there with the other chain. We cut Nicki's vocals in a day, and I came back and we redid a few things, so you could say it was a two-day process."

The song was mixed in only a day, and Muzzy went to Conway to see what minor adjustments Minaj wanted to do to the mix.

"Starships"
A 21 second sample of the song's chorus.

"Starships" is a dance-pop, Europop, trance rap, electropop and techno-pop song that features Minaj rapping in the verses, after the song opens with an electric guitar. According to MTV, the song shows Minaj's "pop side". During the final breakdown, a stadium football chant can be heard chanting the lead notes of the song. Jocelyn Vena of MTV said that "it's hard not to see [Britney] Spears' influence on the rapper/singer when listening to the song." Billboard compared "Starships" to the work of Lady Gaga and Jennifer Lopez, other artists produced by RedOne. Musically, "Starships" is written in the key of D major and follows a moderate tempo of 125 beats per minute. Written in common time, the song follows a chord progression of D−A−G−Bm−F♯m−G. The song contains a brief interpolation of "Twinkle Twinkle Little Star" as written by Jane Taylor. Hector and Mohombi provide backing vocals during the final chorus.

In September 2013, electronic artist Clive Tanaka filed a lawsuit against the song's writers, claiming it infringed on his composition and recording "Neu Chicago". The lawsuit was dismissed.

== Critical reception ==
The Los Angeles Times wrote that "The new single will undoubtedly divide Minaj's fan base. Longtime fans may want the cypher queen they fell in love with when she was young and hungry on the mixtape circuit, while her newer, sugar pop-loving delegation will likely crave the quirkier verses – and cotton candy-colored wigs – of today's Minaj." Jocelyn Vena from MTV stated that "The song not only is pure pop perfection, but RedOne's influence is evident, thanks to its grinding Euro dance beats", adding that "It is certainly the perfect song for those who enjoyed shaking their groove thang to 'Super Bass'. The lighthearted, feel-good vibe of the song is perfect for casual Barbz to blast. It's hard not to see Britney Spears' influence on the rapper/singer when listening to the song, and given that the two toured together last year, Minaj may be trying to remind her pop fans that she has an ear for what they want." Entertainment Weekly gave a negative review, stating the song is, "super clubby and contains almost no rapping, which continues Minaj's push into the complete opposite direction she should be heading."

Bill Lamb from About.com gave a mixed review, stating: "'Starships' is a solid outing for Nicki Minaj. However, the day-glo pop-rap success of 'Super Bass', emotional power of 'Fly', and experimentation of her Grammy Awards performance has left us expecting Nicki Minaj to push boundaries. 'Starships' feels a little bit like retreating into a musical pocket and trying a little too hard to insure another pop chart hit. The result is pleasurable but not particularly memorable." Bloggers for Billboard magazine, Andrew Hampp and Erika Ramirez, criticized the track for "...monstrous pop hooks that overshadow its throwaway lyrics", while stating that it is "the most polarizing single in Minaj's career to date". The pair also noticed that Minaj seemed to be exploring her "musical identity" through singing instead of focusing on her strengths. Slant stated that "Starships (along with 'Pound the Alarm', 'Whip It', and 'Automatic') are "retro-techno-pop earsores comprised of indiscriminately arranged bits of LMFAO's 'Sexy and I Know It', Rihanna's 'We Found Love', and pretty much any recent Britney Spears or Katy Perry song you can name", adding that "for the chorus to her self-affirmation anthem, Minaj shouts 'Starships were meant to fly!', echoing Katy Perry's 'Baby, you're a firework!' for its uncomprehending intuition that if something is in the sky then it must also be inspiring."

== Commercial performance ==
"Starships" debuted at number nine on the U.S. Billboard Hot 100, marking her second solo arrival in the top 10 after "Super Bass", which reached number three. The song peaked at number five for four non-consecutive weeks, and has been certified diamond in the US by the RIAA. In the week beginning July 13, 2012, "Starships" made history on the chart by having spent twenty-one consecutive weeks in the top ten from its debut week, surpassing the Black Eyed Peas' single "I Gotta Feeling", which had spent 20 weeks in the top 10 in 2009, but has been passed by Justin Bieber's "Love Yourself", then The Chainsmokers' "Closer" (2016–2017), which spent 32 weeks in the top 10. The song peaked at number two on the Hot Dance Club Songs chart and number three on Pop Songs. It managed to reach number 10 on Rap Songs and 85 on the Hot R&B/Hip-Hop Songs chart. As of December 2014, the song has sold 4.5 million copies in the United States.

In Australia, the song debuted at number 14, rising to number two, staying there for five consecutive weeks. The song became Minaj's highest single in that country (until "Super Freaky Girl" topped the country's chart), and was certified 12× platinum by the Australian Recording Industry Association (ARIA) with sales exceeding 840,000.

In New Zealand, the song debuted at 12. The next week, it rose to four and peaked at number two. The song became Minaj's second highest-peaking and longest-charting single in that country, and was certified 2× platinum certification by the Recording Industry Association of New Zealand (RIANZ) with sales exceeding 30,000. The song made the top five for the top-selling singles of 2012 in New Zealand, placing at four.

== Music video ==
Minaj on a beach in Hawaii in the music video

The "Starships" video was filmed on Kualoa Ranch, Oahu Island, Hawaii, and the opening scene is from the Nā Pali Coast on the island of Kauaʻi in Hawaii. It was a three-day shoot, beginning on March 13, 2012. The video was directed by Anthony Mandler with extensive post-VFX produced by Leah Harmony and executed by a team of artists at Culver City-based post production company KILT. In an interview with Capital FM, Minaj called the video "very, very saucy" and her "best one yet". The video premiered on MTV on April 26, 2012.

MTV's John Mitchell criticized the video's postponed release, finding it strange that the video for "Beez in the Trap", the album's third single, was released before that of "Starships". On May 28, 2012, a "Starships" video campaign was announced on Minaj's official website. It asked fans to record a video of themselves performing "Starships" by singing, dancing or with a musical instrument. Minaj then selected 5 winners, and the contest winners won tickets and passes to meet Minaj on her Pink Friday Tour. The song won the MTV Video Music Award for Best Female Video in September 2012.

== Live performances ==
On February 26, 2012, Minaj performed the single live for the first time along with "Moment 4 Life", "Turn Me On" and "Super Bass" at the 2012 NBA All-Star Game. Minaj also performed the single on the eleventh season of American Idol on March 29, 2012, and on Today on April 6. Minaj performed the song in a mash-up with "Right by My Side" on The Ellen DeGeneres Show on May 10, 2012. Minaj also performed the single on her Pink Friday Tour. The song was the encore song of Minaj's Pink Friday: Reloaded Tour and The Pinkprint Tour. On May 30, 2015, Minaj performed the song on the iHeartRadio Summer Pool Party 2015 in Las Vegas, along with other singles, such as "Super Bass" and "The Night Is Still Young". Minaj performed the song on her fourth concert tour, The Nicki Wrld Tour, in 2019.

During the 2024 New Year's Eve at E11Even in Miami, Minaj interrupted the song during its opening lines and announced to the audience she will no longer perform it at her shows, explaining that she no longer likes the song, calling it "stupid", although she would later perform it on the Gag City Tour.

== Awards and nominations ==
Awards
| Year | Ceremony | Category | Result | Ref. |
|---|---|---|---|---|
| 2012 | 4Music Video Honours | Best R&B/Dance | Won | |
| 2012 | iHeartRadio MuchMusic Video Awards | International Video of the Year | Nominated | |
| 2012 | MTV Video Music Awards | Best Female Video | Won | |
| 2012 | Q Awards | Best Video | Nominated | |
| 2012 | Soul Train Music Awards | Best Dance Performance | Nominated | |
| 2012 | Teen Choice Awards | Choice Music: R&B/Hip-Hop Song | Won | |
| 2012 | Virgin Media Music Awards | Best Video | Nominated | |
| 2013 | Billboard Music Awards | Top Dance Song | Nominated | |
| 2013 | BMI London Awards | Award-Winning Song | Won | |
| 2013 | BMI Pop Awards | Award-Winning Song | Won | |
| 2013 | BMI R&B/Hip-Hop Awards | Song of the Year | Won | |
| 2013 | BMI R&B/Hip-Hop Awards | Award-Winning Song | Won | |
| 2013 | Capital FM's Music Video Awards | Best Video | Nominated | |
| 2013 | Capital FM's Music Video Awards | Raunchiest Video | Nominated | |
| 2013 | International Dance Music Awards | Best Rap/Hip Hop Dance Track | Nominated | |
| 2013 | MTV Platinum Video Plays Awards | Most-Played Music Video | Won | |

== Track listing ==
Digital download

1. "Starships" – 3:30

German and UK CD single

1. "Starships" – 3:30
2. "Stupid Hoe" – 3:16

== Personnel ==
Credits adapted from the liner notes of Pink Friday: Roman Reloaded.

- Nicki Minaj – vocals
- RedOne – producer, instruments
- Carl Falk – producer, mixing, additional vocals, instruments, guitar
- Rami Yacoub – producer, mixing, vocal editing, instruments
- Wayne Hector – additional vocals
- Trevor Muzzy – recording, mixing, vocal editing
- Ariel Chobaz – recording
- Jon Sher – recording assistant
- Mohombi – additional vocals

== Charts ==
=== Weekly charts ===
2012 weekly chart performance for "Starships"
| Chart (2012) | Peak position |
|---|---|
| Australia (ARIA) | 2 |
| Australia (ARIA Urban) | 2 |
| Austria (Ö3 Austria Top 40) | 26 |
| Belgium (Ultratop 50 Flanders) | 5 |
| Belgium (Ultratop Flanders Dance) | 2 |
| Belgium (Ultratop Flanders Urban) | 7 |
| Belgium (Ultratop 50 Wallonia) | 7 |
| Belgium (Ultratop Wallonia Dance) | 1 |
| Brazil (Billboard Brasil Hot 100) | 22 |
| Brazil Hot Pop Songs | 21 |
| Canada (Canadian Hot 100) | 4 |
| Canada CHR/Top 40 (Billboard) | 1 |
| Canada Hot AC (Billboard) | 19 |
| Colombia (National-Report) | 11 |
| Czech Republic Airplay (ČNS IFPI) | 24 |
| Denmark (Tracklisten) | 5 |
| Euro Digital Song Sales (Billboard) | 4 |
| Finland (Suomen virallinen lista) | 3 |
| France (SNEP) | 5 |
| France Airplay (SNEP) | 1 |
| Germany (GfK) | 17 |
| Honduras (Honduras Top 50) | 1 |
| Hungary (Rádiós Top 40) | 9 |
| Ireland (IRMA) | 2 |
| Italy (FIMI) | 35 |
| Japan Hot 100 (Billboard) | 4 |
| Luxembourg (Billboard) | 10 |
| Mexico (Billboard Mexican Airplay) | 20 |
| Mexico Anglo (Monitor Latino) | 9 |
| Netherlands (Dutch Top 40) | 4 |
| Netherlands (Single Top 100) | 5 |
| Netherlands (Mega Top 50) | 5 |
| New Zealand (Recorded Music NZ) | 2 |
| Norway (VG-lista) | 4 |
| Poland (Video Chart) | 2 |
| Scottish Singles Sales (Official Charts) | 1 |
| Slovakia Airplay (ČNS IFPI) | 9 |
| South Korea (Gaon Music Chart) | 75 |
| Spain (Promusicae) | 5 |
| Sweden (Sverigetopplistan) | 3 |
| Switzerland (Schweizer Hitparade) | 5 |
| UK Singles (Official Charts) | 2 |
| UK Hip Hop/R&B (Official Charts) | 1 |
| US Billboard Hot 100 | 5 |
| US Adult Pop Airplay (Billboard) | 24 |
| US Dance Club Songs (Billboard) | 2 |
| US Dance Airplay (Billboard) | 2 |
| US Hot R&B/Hip-Hop Songs (Billboard) | 85 |
| US Hot Rap Songs (Billboard) | 10 |
| US Latin Pop Airplay (Billboard) | 23 |
| US Pop Airplay (Billboard) | 3 |
| US Rhythmic Airplay (Billboard) | 3 |

2025 weekly chart performance for "Starships"
| Chart (2012) | Peak position |
|---|---|
| Jamaica Airplay (JAMMS) | 4 |

=== Year-end charts ===
Year-end chart performance for "Starships"
| Chart (2012) | Position |
|---|---|
| Australia (ARIA) | 6 |
| Belgium (Ultratop Flanders) | 17 |
| Belgium (Ultratop Wallonia) | 22 |
| Canada (Canadian Hot 100) | 9 |
| France (SNEP) | 24 |
| Germany (Media Control Charts) | 78 |
| Hungary (Rádiós Top 40) | 37 |
| Ireland (IRMA) | 6 |
| Italy (FIMI) | 76 |
| Japan (Japan Hot 100) | 37 |
| Netherlands (Dutch Top 40) | 21 |
| Netherlands (Single Top 100) | 25 |
| New Zealand (Recorded Music NZ) | 4 |
| Sweden (Sverigetopplistan) | 15 |
| Switzerland (Schweizer Hitparade) | 28 |
| UK Singles (OCC) | 7 |
| US Billboard Hot 100 | 9 |
| US Dance Club Songs (Billboard) | 28 |
| US Dance/Mix Show Airplay (Billboard) | 18 |
| US Mainstream Top 40 (Billboard) | 13 |
| US Hot Rap Songs (Billboard) | 31 |
| US Rhythmic (Billboard) | 12 |

=== Decade-end charts ===
2010s-end chart performance for "Starships"
| Chart (2010–19) | Position |
|---|---|
| Australia (ARIA) | 91 |

== Certifications ==
Certifications for "Starships"
| Region | Certification | Certified units/sales |
|---|---|---|
| Australia (ARIA) | 12× Platinum | 840,000^{‡} |
| Belgium (BRMA) | Gold | 15,000^{*} |
| Brazil (Pro-Música Brasil) | Diamond | 250,000^{‡} |
| Denmark (IFPI Danmark) | Gold | 15,000^{^} |
| France | — | 106,400 |
| Germany (BVMI) | Platinum | 300,000^{‡} |
| Italy (FIMI) | Platinum | 30,000^{‡} |
| Japan (RIAJ) | Platinum | 250,000^{*} |
| New Zealand (RMNZ) | 5× Platinum | 150,000^{‡} |
| Norway (IFPI Norway) | 3× Platinum | 30,000^{*} |
| Spain (Promusicae) | Platinum | 60,000^{‡} |
| Sweden (GLF) | 3× Platinum | 120,000^{‡} |
| Switzerland (IFPI Switzerland) | Platinum | 30,000^{^} |
| United Kingdom (BPI) | 4× Platinum | 2,400,000^{‡} |
| United States (RIAA) | Diamond | 10,000,000^{‡} |
Streaming
| Denmark (IFPI Danmark) | 2× Platinum | 3,600,000^{†} |
^{*} Sales figures based on certification alone.^{^} Shipments figures based on certification alone.^{‡} Sales+streaming figures based on certification alone.^{†} Streaming-only figures based on certification alone.

== Release history ==
Release dates for "Starships"
| Country | Date | Format | Ref. |
|---|---|---|---|
| United States | February 14, 2012 | Radio premiere; digital download | |
| Canada | February 14, 2012 | Digital download | |
| United Kingdom | February 14, 2012 | Digital download | |
| Ireland | February 14, 2012 | Digital download | |
| Belgium | February 15, 2012 | Digital download | |
| Spain | February 15, 2012 | Digital download | |
| Finland | February 15, 2012 | Digital download | |
| Italy | February 15, 2012 | Digital download | |
| Luxembourg | February 15, 2012 | Digital download | |
| Netherlands | February 15, 2012 | Digital download | |
| New Zealand | February 15, 2012 | Digital download | |
| Norway | February 15, 2012 | Digital download | |
| Austria | February 15, 2012 | Digital download | |
| Portugal | February 15, 2012 | Digital download | |
| Singapore | February 15, 2012 | Digital download | |
| United States | February 21, 2012 | Mainstream radio; Rhythmic radio | |
| Germany | April 6, 2012 | CD single | |

== See also ==
- List of best-selling singles
- List of best-selling singles in Australia
- List of Billboard Hot 100 top 10 singles in 2012
