= Roman Reloaded (song) =

Promotional single by Nicki Minaj featuring Lil Wayne

from the album Pink Friday: Roman Reloaded
- Released: February 24, 2012
- Recorded: 2011
- Studio: Conway Recording Studios (Los Angeles, CA); The Hit Factory Criteria (Miami, FL)
- Genre: Hardcore hip hop
- Length: 3:14
- Label: Young Money; Cash Money; Universal Republic
- Songwriters: Onika Maraj; Dwayne Carter; Ricardo Lamarre
- Producer: Rico Beats

Audio video
- "Roman Reloaded" on YouTube

"Roman Reloaded" is a song by rapper Nicki Minaj featuring Lil Wayne, from Minaj's second studio album Pink Friday: Roman Reloaded. After being premiered on February 23, 2012 on Hot 97 radio, "Roman Reloaded" was released to digital outlets the next day as a promotional single. It was produced by Rico Beats.

== Background ==
Minaj premiered the song on February 23, 2012 on radio station Hot 97. It later released for digital download on February 24, 2012 as a promotional single from Pink Friday: Roman Reloaded, following "Roman in Moscow" and "Stupid Hoe". It was produced by Rico Beats.

Minaj takes jabs at her rival Lil' Kim and at Miami Heat player Chris Bosh crying in the locker room after his team lost to the Dallas Mavericks in the 2011 NBA Finals. Additionally, Minaj drops references to former NBA player Eric Williams who is featured on VH1's Basketball Wives, the Columbine High School massacre, the Nicki Minaj Barbie doll created and auctioned by Mattel in December 2011, and to her role in the 2012 animated film Ice Age: Continental Drift.

== Critical reception ==
The song has received positive reviews from music critics. MTV said that "Roman Reloaded seems to be a return to the hard-core rap style Nicki first entered the game with on mixtapes like Beam Me Up Scotty......How the title track will fit on Pink Friday: Roman Reloaded remains to be seen, but as a standalone, it proves that when it comes to simply spewing rap bars, Nicki Minaj is still the queen bee." Billboard said that "Unlike the RedOne-produced dance-pop candy of 'Starships' or the Grammy-premiered exorcism drama of 'Roman Holiday', 'Roman Reloaded' is a more traditionalist hip-hop offering, featuring hard-hitting production and guest verses from Lil Wayne." Emily Mackay called Minaj's performance on the chorus the "worst kind of WTF moment", being a "horrific cockney" that is "zany for the sake of it".

== Live performances ==
Minaj performed "Roman Reloaded" for the first time on 106 & Park on April 3, 2012, along with "HOV Lane", "I Am Your Leader", "Beez in the Trap", "Champion", "Right by My Side" and "Fire Burns". "Roman Reloaded" was also performed on the European and American legs of Minaj's Pink Friday Tour. The song is also included on Minaj's Pink Friday: Reloaded Tour setlist.

== Track listing ==
Digital download

1. "Roman Reloaded" (featuring Lil Wayne) – 3:16

== Charts ==
Chart (2012)	Peak position
South Korea (Gaon)	28
UK Hip Hop/R&B (Official Charts)	40
UK Singles (Official Charts Company)	143
US Billboard Hot 100	70
US Hot R&B/Hip-Hop Songs (Billboard)	57

== Release history ==
Country	Date	Format	Label
Worldwide	February 24, 2012	Digital download	Universal Music, Cash Money
United States	March 6, 2012	Urban radio	Universal Music, Cash Money
