= Pink Friday Tour =

2012 concert tour by Nicki Minaj

- Tour by Nicki Minaj
- Promotional poster for tour
- Associated albums: Pink Friday; Pink Friday: Roman Reloaded
- Start date: May 16, 2012
- End date: August 14, 2012
- Legs: 6
- No. of shows: 44

Nicki Minaj concert chronology
- Pink Friday Promo Tour (2010); Pink Friday Tour (2012); Pink Friday: Reloaded Tour (2012)

The Pink Friday Tour was the first concert tour by the American rapper Nicki Minaj in support of her first two albums, Pink Friday (2010) and Pink Friday: Roman Reloaded (2012). The tour was officially announced on via Twitter in 2010.

The tour began in May 2012 with shows in Australia and Asia. The tour then continued on to Europe and North America in June, July, and August 2012. The tour concluded on August 14, 2012, in New York City at the Roseland Ballroom. After playing 41 shows on 4 continents, Minaj followed up the tour with the Pink Friday: Reloaded Tour.

== Background and development ==
While promoting her second album in the UK, Minaj revealed tour dates for major cities in England. Minaj officially announced the tour via Twitter on May 1, 2012. She also mentioned that the tour would have an "intimate yet big" feel.

Laurieann Gibson served as creative director and choreographer for the tour, and stated; "Nicki Minaj was so much fun for me, and it was like a real breath of fresh air, and musically, to get back to the rap game, to see a female MC dominate the pop charts, this, historically, for me, I feel a bit of responsibility", in a MTV interview.

== Concert synopsis ==
The concert is divided into five acts, which all incorporate Minaj's hip-hop, pop, rap, and R&B music.

An intro was played at the beginning the show with Minaj's voice explaining that her alter ego "Roman", warrior of "Pinkslam", must travel for 40 days, and 40 nights, to planet Earth to defeat an evil force known as "Nemesis".

Minaj begins the concert in a black cloak, singing the fiery-bar spitting song "Roman's Revenge" or the fast-paced "Roman Holiday" while standing on top of the stage with a church themed backdrop. After the first chorus, Minaj takes off the cloak and reveals a new outfit which consisted of pink and black polka dot high rise panties, and a yellow and black polka dot jacket, or a graffiti themed jacket, paired with leggings underneath. She then begins her hip-hop segment with "Did it on 'Em" followed by her verses in "I Am Your Leader" continued with "Beez in the Trap" and then on to a snippet of "Stupid Hoe" before rolling into her verse in Big Sean's "Dance (A$$)".

After a brief pause, Minaj continues the show with a new segment starting with "Right by My Side" that flows into "Champion" and concludes the segment with "Moment 4 Life" while wearing the same attire as last segment. The medley's backdrop consisted of a sky themed backdrop. After finishing, the DJ plays an interlude leading up to the next segment.

After the interlude ends, Minaj returns to the stage wearing a white vest, white leggings, and a white tutu accompanied with white high heels. Minaj's dancers have also changed into gold attire. Minaj then takes a splatter-painted gun and sprays the crowd with white fog. After Minaj sets the gun down she returns to her group of female dancers before jumping into "Starships" which starts the pop segment of the concert. To go along with "Starships" the backdrop was inside of a "Starship". After "Starships", she then sings "Pound the Alarm". Next, Minaj walks around the stage slapping her dancer's butts before heading into "Whip It". Minaj then dives into her verses in David Guetta's dance anthem "Where Them Girls At". Then Minaj performs "Turn Me On". Minaj then walks off stage for a second time for another outfit change.

At the end of the interlude Nicki emerges from backstage with a pink dress on and also changed her wig to a short blond wig with pink accents. She then talks about how she got her heart broken and wanted to literally kill someone. She followed that statement with saying "But instead I wrote a song." which lead into "Fire Burns" with an Autumn themed background. She followed the song by then performing "Save Me" with Barbie's house as a backdrop. After "Save Me" she left the stage which ended her softer, more emotional segment of the show. Another DJ interlude played while she made her final costume change of the concert.

For the last segment Minaj is dressed with graffiti leggings, a striped shirt, black panties, with a pink hat and some necklaces. She had also changed her wig to solid black with bangs. The background for this segment is a basic speaker system. She then performs a mixtape medley which consisted of songs such as "Go Hard", "Sweet Dreams", "Slumber Party", "Beam Me Up Scotty", "Freaky Gurl", "I Get Crazy", and "Itty Bitty Piggy" from her mixtapes. In the European leg of the tour Minaj also performed "Itty Bitty Piggy" in the medley. Minaj then performs "Come On A Cone" before the final medley. The final medley consisted of songs such as "Up All Night", "Make Me Proud", "My Chick Bad", "Bottoms Up", "Monster", "Letting Go (Dutty Love)", "Hold Yuh", "BedRock", "Roman Reloaded", and "Roman in Moscow". Following the final medley, Minaj states "Is there a song you haven't heard yet?", which leads right into "Super Bass". Minaj finishes "Super Bass" at the top of the stage with white fog shooting in the air along each staircase before saying "Thank you and goodnight!" which leads to an encore chorus before Nicki and her dancers exit the stage.

== Critical response ==
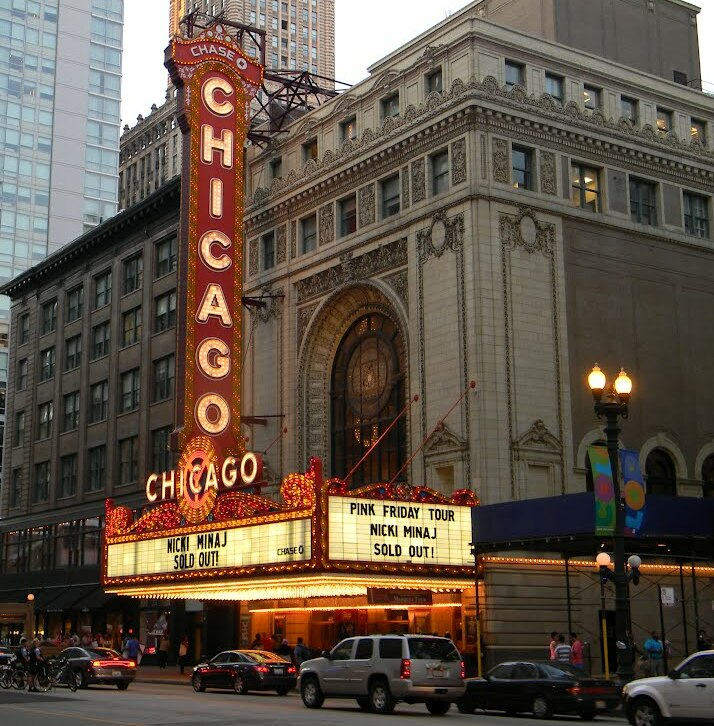
The marquee of the Chicago Theatre listing the July 16 concert

The tour received generally positive reviews from music critics. Kicking off the tour in Australia, music critics gave the performances extremely positive reviews. Kathy McCabe (The Daily Telegraph) writes that Minaj was "colorful" during the tour's debut at the Horden Pavilion. She continues, "Minaj graciously brought her arena show to town with its awesome backdrop of videos, those ripped dancers, a song list of hits, her graciousness and potty mouth, and smashed it all together into a one-hour show. A lot of smoke and mirrors but all of it rather delectable. Except for the poor mums". Hannah Kimber (news.com.au) states Minaj's show in Sydney was an array of "deep beats, technicolour lighting and Disney inspired ensembles". She further states, "It was a night of tiny tasty Nicki treats all mashed into a mini musical feast with tight choreography and lots to look at. But 65 minutes was not long enough for a full Nicki fix and the rabid Barbz in Sydney craved more Minaj". At the Hisense Arena, Tran Nguyen (Take 40 Australia) humorously gave the show eight out of ten weaves. He says, "it was her performance of "Starships" that drove the fans completely wild. The ground shook harder, and more arms were flailing about (and blocking my view—although, my lack of height may have something to with that). Fans were jumping up and down, and occasionally busting a move or two". The concert at the Brisbane Entertainment Centre was given two and a half out of five stars by Bridie Jabour (Brisbane Times). She says, ""Nicki did the obligatory good night and I love you and left the stage. And then something happened that I have not witnessed at the Brisbane Entertainment Centre or even the Tivoli. Everyone just left. There were no screams for an encore, no chanting of her name, no pleading for her to return and do just one more song. Nicki had finished her show and her fans were more than ready for it to be finished".

Alexis Petridis from The Guardian attended the show at the Hammersmith Apollo in London, he gave the Pink Friday Tour an average score with 3 out of 5 stars, saying "It seems a strange thing to say about a performance that opens with a woman rapping "I'm a bad bitch, I'm a cunt", but there's something oddly restrained about Nicki Minaj's live show. Then Petridis later commented on how moderate the show was in comparison to her exorcism-themed performance at the 54th Grammy Awards, "Given this is a woman who staged a mock exorcism on stage at the Grammys, before being hoisted into the air on wires while singing O Come All Ye Faithful, it's a relatively stripped-down show, which cleaves more to hip-hop tradition than pop extravaganza. There are costume changes and a confetti cannon, but there's no band, just a small troupe of dancers, a DJ and a hype man". Jon Carmanica of the NY Times, gave the tour a positive review speaking on her ability to reach pop and hip-hop audiences, "Unlike almost any other rapper, she manages to exist on pop radio and hip-hop radio simultaneously (generally with different songs), and she's equally comfortable in both spaces."

== Opening acts ==
- Stooshe (UK)
- Timomatic (Melbourne, Sydney)
- Stan Walker (Brisbane)
- 2 Chainz (North America)
- Baby K (Italy)
- Mr Polska (Netherlands)

=== Musicians ===
- Nicki Minaj - Main Performer, Vocals
- Omar Edwards - Musical Direction
- Adam Blackstone - Musical Direction
- Devine Evans - Music Programmer, Composer

== Setlist ==
=== Australian ===
1. "Roman Holiday"
2. "Did It On'em"
3. "I Am Your Leader"
4. "Beez in the Trap"
5. "Stupid Hoe"
6. "Dance (A$$)"
7. "Right by My Side"
8. "Moment 4 Life"
9. "Champion"
10. "Starships"
11. "Pound the Alarm"
12. "Whip It"
13. "Fire Burns"
14. "Save Me"
15. "Bottoms Up"
16. "Where Them Girls At"
17. "Turn Me On"
18. "Super Bass"

=== Japanese ===
1. "Roman Holiday"
2. "Did It On'em"
3. "I Am Your Leader"
4. "Beez in the Trap"
5. "Stupid Hoe"
6. "Dance (A$$)"
7. "Right by My Side"
8. "Champion
9. "Moment 4 Life"
10. "Starships"
11. "Pound the Alarm"
12. "Whip It"
13. "Where Them Girls At"
14. "Fire Burns"
15. "Save Me"
16. "Roman's Revenge"
17. "Bottoms Up"
18. "Turn Me On"
19. "Super Bass"

=== European ===
1. "Roman's Revenge"
2. "Did It On'em"
3. "I Am Your Leader"
4. "Beez in the Trap"
5. "Stupid Hoe"
6. "Dance (A$$)"
7. "Right by My Side"
8. "Moment 4 Life"
9. "Starships"
10. "Pound the Alarm"
11. "Whip It"
12. "Where Them Girls At"
13. "Turn Me On"
14. "Fire Burns"
15. "Save Me"
16. "Itty Bitty Piggy"
17. "Roman Reloaded"
18. "HOV Lane"
19. "Come on a Cone"
20. "Letting Go (Dutty Love)"
21. "Make Me Proud"
22. "Monster"
23. "Up All Night"
24. "My Chick Bad"
25. "Hold Yuh"
26. "Bottoms Up"
27. "BedRock"
28. "Super Bass"

=== Manila ===
1. "Roman's Revenge"
2. "Did It On'em"
3. "I Am Your Leader"
4. "Beez in the Trap"
5. "Stupid Hoe"
6. "Dance (A$$)"
7. "Right by My Side"
8. "Moment 4 Life"
9. "Starships"
10. "Pound the Alarm"
11. "Whip It"
12. "Turn Me On"
13. "Where Them Girls At"
14. "Fire Burns"
15. "Save Me"
16. Medley
17. "Up All Night"
18. "My Chick Bad"
19. "Bottoms Up"
20. "Hold Yuh"
21. "BedRock"
22. "Super Bass"

=== United States ===
1. "Roman's Revenge"
2. "Did It On'em"
3. "I Am Your Leader"
4. "Beez in the Trap"
5. "Stupid Hoe"
6. "Dance (A$$)"
7. "Right by My Side"
8. "Moment 4 Life"
9. "Starships"
10. "Pound the Alarm"
11. "Whip It" / "Turn Me On" (2 song medley)
12. "Where Them Girls At"
13. "Fire Burns"
14. "Save Me"
15. "Go Hard"
16. "Sweet Dreams"
17. "Slumber Party"
18. "Beam Me Up Scotty"
19. "I Get Crazy"
20. "Itty Bitty Piggy"
21. "Come On A Cone"
22. "Up All Night"
23. "Make Me Proud"
24. "My Chick Bad"
25. "Bottoms Up"
26. "Monster"
27. "Freaky Gurl"
28. "Letting Go (Dutty Love)"
29. "Hold Yuh"
30. "BedRock"
31. "Roman Reloaded"
32. "Roman in Moscow"
33. "Super Bass"

=== Vancouver ===
1. "Roman's Revenge"
2. "Did It On'em"
3. "I Am Your Leader"
4. "Beez in the Trap"
5. "Stupid Hoe"
6. "Dance (A$$)"
7. "Right by My Side"
8. "Moment 4 Life"
9. "Starships"
10. "Pound the Alarm"
11. "Whip It"
12. "Where Them Girls At"
13. "Fire Burns"
14. "Save Me"
15. "Itty Bitty Piggy" / "I Get Crazy" / "Roger That" (3 song medley)
16. "Come on a Cone"
17. "Up All Night"
18. "Make Me Proud"
19. "My Chick Bad"
20. "Bottoms Up"
21. "Letting Go (Dutty Love)"
22. "BedRock"
23. "Roman in Moscow"
24. "Super Bass"

=== Pepsi promotional show ===
1. "Roman's Revenge"
2. "Did It On'em"
3. "I Am Your Leader" (with Cam'ron)
4. "Touch It or Not" (with Cam'ron)
5. "Beez in the Trap"
6. "Stupid Hoe"
7. "I Luv Dem Strippers" / "Dance (A$$)" (2 song medley)
8. "Right by My Side"
9. "Moment 4 Life"
10. "Starships"
11. "Pound the Alarm"
12. "Whip It"
13. "Turn Me On"
14. "Fire Burns"
15. "Save Me"
16. "Itty Bitty Piggy"
17. "Go Hard"
18. "Sweet Dreams"
19. "Can't Stop, Won't Stop"
20. "I Get Crazy"
21. "Roman in Moscow"
22. "Born Stunna" / "Roger That"
23. "Come On A Cone"
24. "Letting Go (Dutty Love)"
25. "Hold Yuh"
26. "My Chick Bad"
27. "Bottoms Up"
28. "5 Star Chick"
29. "Freaky Gurl"
30. "Slumber Party"
31. "Out of My Mind"
32. "BK Anthem"
33. "Oh Yeah" (with Foxy Brown)
34. "Tables Will Turn" (with Foxy Brown)
35. "Up All Night" (with Drake)
36. "Make Me Proud" (with Drake)
37. "Take It to the Head" (with Lil Wayne)
38. "The Motto" (with Drake and Lil Wayne)
39. "Roman Reloaded"
40. "Super Bass"

== Tour dates ==
Date	City	Country	Venue
Australian East Coast Leg
May 16, 2012	Sydney	Australia	Hordern Pavilion
May 18, 2012	Melbourne	Australia	Hisense Arena
May 19, 2012	Brisbane	Australia	Brisbane Entertainment Centre
Japanese Leg
May 22, 2012	Osaka	Japan	Namba Hatch
May 23, 2012	Tokyo	Japan	Zepp Tokyo
May 25, 2012	Yokohama	Japan	Yokohama Bay Hall
Camden, NJ, USA Show
June 1, 2012 ^{[A]}	Camden	United States	Susquehanna Bank Center
European Leg
June 8, 2012	Stockholm	Sweden	Annexet
June 9, 2012	Oslo	Norway	Oslo Spektrum
June 11, 2012	Copenhagen	Denmark	Falkoner Teatret
June 13, 2012	Brussels	Belgium	Ancienne Belgique
June 16, 2012	Berlin	Germany	Tempodrom
June 18, 2012	Amsterdam	Netherlands	Heineken Music Hall
June 21, 2012	Milan	Italy	Discoteca Alcatraz
June 23, 2012^{[B]}	London	England	Hackney Marshes
June 24, 2012	London	England	Hammersmith Apollo
June 25, 2012	London	England	Hammersmith Apollo
June 26, 2012	Birmingham	England	National Indoor Arena
June 28, 2012	Manchester	England	O_{2} Apollo Manchester
July 6, 2012	Paris	France	Zénith de Paris
July 7, 2012^{[C]}	London	England	Hyde Park
July 8, 2012^{[D]}	Kinross	Scotland	Balado Airfield
Manila, Philippines Show
July 11, 2012	Manila	Philippines	Mall of Asia Arena
North American Leg
July 16, 2012	Chicago	United States	Chicago Theatre
July 17, 2012	Detroit	United States	Fox Theatre
July 18, 2012	Minneapolis	United States	State Theatre Minneapolis
July 19, 2012	Cleveland	United States	State Theatre Cleveland
July 21, 2012	Washington, D.C.	United States	DAR Constitution Hall
July 22, 2012	Atlanta	United States	Fabulous Fox Theatre
July 24, 2012	Miami	United States	Knight Center Theater
July 26, 2012	Birmingham	United States	Boutwell Memorial Auditorium
July 27, 2012	New Orleans	United States	Lakefront Arena
July 28, 2012	Houston	United States	Bayou Music Center
July 29, 2012	Grand Prairie	United States	Verizon Theatre at Grand Prairie
July 31, 2012	St. Louis	United States	Peabody Opera House
August 2, 2012	Denver	United States	Wells Fargo Theatre
August 4, 2012	Las Vegas	United States	PH Live
August 7, 2012	Phoenix	United States	Comerica Theatre
August 8, 2012	Los Angeles	United States	Nokia Theatre L.A. Live
August 9, 2012	Oakland	United States	Paramount Theatre Oakland
August 11, 2012	Seattle	United States	Paramount Theatre Seattle
August 12, 2012	Vancouver	Canada	Queen Elizabeth Theatre
August 14, 2012^{[E]}	New York City	United States	Roseland Ballroom

=== Notes ===
^{A} This concert is part of Wired 96.5 Fest.

^{B} This concert is part of Radio 1's Hackney Weekend.

^{C} This concert is a part of the Barclaycard Wireless Festival.

^{D} This concert is a part of T in the Park.

^{E} This concert is a part of a free, Pepsi promotional concert, Attendees were only eligible for a chance to win tickets if you called on radio stations Hot 97, Power 105, Z-100, 92.3 Now, and WBLI or tweet Nicki Minaj or Pepsi on Twitter.

=== Cancellations and rescheduled shows ===
June 2, 2012	Mansfield, United States	Comcast Center-JAM'N 94.5 Presents: Summer Jam 2012	Cancelled
July 4, 2012	Dublin, Ireland	Olympia Theatre	Rescheduled to August 21, 2012
August 5, 2012	Los Angeles	Nokia Theatre L.A. Live	Rescheduled to August 8, 2012
August 18, 2012	Weston-Under-Lizard	Weston Park – V Festival	Cancelled due to strained vocal cords.
August 19, 2012	Chelmsford	Hylands Park – V Festival	Cancelled due to strained vocal cords.
August 21, 2012	Dublin	Olympia Theatre	Cancelled due to strained vocal cords.

=== Box office score data ===
Venue	City	Tickets sold / available	Gross revenue
Hordern Pavilion	Sydney	5,377 / 5,377 (100%)	$490,692
Chicago Theatre	Chicago	3,521 / 3,521 (100%)	$229,938
Fox Theatre	Atlanta	4,357 / 4,545 (96%)	$282,785
Nokia Theatre L.A. Live	Los Angeles	6,300 / 6,864 (91%)	$453,170
TOTAL		19,555 / 20,307 (96.29%)	$1,456,585

== Notes ==
- "Slumber Party" was introduced to the setlist in Cleveland on July 19, 2012.
- Nicki Minaj performed "Roman in Moscow" for the first time in Washington, D.C., on July 21, 2012.
- On July 22, 2012, in Atlanta at the Fox Theatre, many surprise guests came out to perform alongside Minaj, including Young Jeezy, Monica, Bobby Valentino, Waka Flocka Flame, T.I, and Lil Scrappy.
- On July 24, 2012, in Miami, Lil Wayne, Birdman, and DJ Khaled were brought out to perform. Celebrity Angela Simmons was in attendance at this concert.
- On July 27, 2012, in New Orleans, Birdman presented Minaj with a Platinum plaque for her second studio album Pink Friday: Roman Reloaded.
- Rappers Bun B, Slim Thug, and Paul Wall were guests at Minaj's show in Houston on July 28, 2012.
- On August 8, 2012, in Los Angeles Tyga and Sean Kingston came out as surprise performers, also Natasha Bedingfield was in attendance at this concert.
- On August 14, 2012, in New York City, at Roseland Ballroom, Cam'ron, Foxy Brown, Drake, and Lil Wayne were brought out as surprise performers. This show was streamed live by Pepsi, and broadcast in Times Square. Celebrities Busta Rhymes and Russell Simmons were in attendance.
