= Come on a Cone =

Song by Nicki Minaj

from the album Pink Friday: Roman Reloaded
- Recorded: Late 2011
- Studio: Conway Studios (Los Angeles; California) and Jungle City Studios (New York City; New York)
- Genre: Electro hop; hardcore hip hop
- Length: 3:05
- Label: Young Money; Cash Money; Universal Republic
- Songwriters: Onika Maraj; Fernando Garibay; Chauncey Hollis
- Producers: Fernando Garibay & Hit-Boy

Audio video
- "Come On A Cone" on YouTube

"Come on a Cone" is a song by rapper and singer Nicki Minaj, taken from her second album, Pink Friday: Roman Reloaded (2012). Minaj, Garibay and Hit-Boy wrote it and Fernando Garibay & Hit-Boy produced it. Musically, it is a hardcore hip hop song that uses electronic beats. Lyrically, the song is rumored to be another diss song to Lil' Kim, following "Roman's Revenge" and "Stupid Hoe". "Come on a Cone" received mainly positive reviews from contemporary critics, while others criticized the chorus, calling it the main problem of the song.

== Background ==
Minaj and Chauncey Hollis wrote "Come on a Cone" and Hollis produced it. Despite not discussing a particular musical style that the pair wanted to employ beforehand, Hollis had made both "Come on a Cone" and "I Am Your Leader" to suit the album's "bipolar" sound, and sent them in as the first two songs: "I kind of did these records [and] just blindly sent her some beats. It was out of the first batch of beats that I sent." Initially, Minaj rejected the song because it was conceived with a space-age sound, but later Hollis explained that she had suggested changing the tempo, "The tempo was a bit slower so she was like, 'Can you speed this up?' I sped it up, and she hit me back like, 'Yo, this is crazy, I'm writing to it,' and [she] just kept having me send beats." Although Hollis was not present during the recording of "Come on a Cone", he was impressed with the final product, saying, "I just went in blindly, I just sent beats, which is like the stars aligning. She picked the right joints and blacked out on them." The song was recorded at Conway Studios in Los Angeles, California and Jungle City Studios in New York City, New York by Ariel Chobaz, who received assistance from Jon Sher, who also assisted Chobaz in mixing "Come on a Cone" at Conway Studios.

== Composition ==
"Come on a Cone" is a three-minute and five second hardcore hip hop and electro-hop song. It contains a simple, bass-heavy beat, and features percussive "synth-stabs", which according to Marc Hogan of Spin, showcases "Nicki's phenomenal rapping ability".

The song features Minaj as Roman Zolanski and is rumored to be another diss song to Lil' Kim, following "Stupid Hoe". Minaj makes references to Ellen DeGeneres ("When you see me on Ellen / Just admit that I'm winning"), Oscar de la Renta ("Front row with Oscar / De la Renta posture"), Anna Wintour ("When I'm sitting with Anna / I'm really sitting with Anna / Ain't no metaphor punchline / I'm really sitting with Anna"), Versace ("Do a show for Versace / They request me by name / And if they don't get Nicki / It just won't be the same"), and Cee Lo Green ("7 Up went and gave my commercial to Cee Lo...") In the chorus, Nicki as Roman repeats the title in a cartoonish voice, which was compared to "Stupid Hoe".

== Critical reception ==
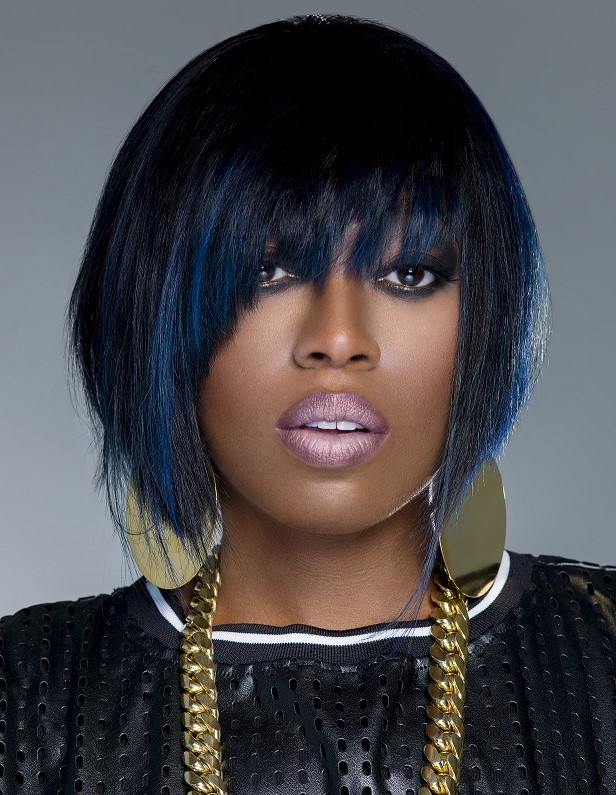
"Come on a Cone" received comparisons to the works of rapper Missy Elliott (pictured).

Jayson Greene of Pitchfork selected the song as a "best new track", and said: "Her performance on this song is something else entirely: demented. Chaotic. Gloriously unpredictable. Fearless. One of the most creatively unhinged vocal takes in pop-rap history – or at least an immediate contender for the top ten. Whatever cheap hyperbole you could fling at this performance, Nicki bats down with one of her palmetto-sized eyelashes". Emily Mackay of NME praised the song's composition for being engaging, but found its lyrical content hard to listen to. In her review of "Come on a Cone", Emily Exton of PopDust had a mixed response, praising its "convincing" delivery and "monstrous" beat and compared the song to Minaj's best guest work, but ended the review by saying: "Things begin 'normal' enough, but Roman's full control over the chorus makes what could be a smooth banger an unstable head-scratcher, where it's difficult to keep track of Nicki versus Roman's intentions."

Henry Yanney of SoulCulture called the song's production "bizarre" and "mind numbing", but said Minaj "still conjures up some verses to again ensure listeners of her rap allegiance." Writing for Slant Magazine, Matthew Cole praised "Come on a Cone" as being "brilliant", and called it "one of the most hilarious and genuinely unexpected moments I've heard from a rapper" since Missy Elliott. Joe Rivers of No Ripcord noted the song to be among the least commercial on the album, saying: "Here, beats are sparse, and frills and instrumentation are minimal. It’s all geared up to make Minaj’s rhymes the focal point, and it gives the record something of a mixtape feel." Chris Willman of TheWrap said "Come on a Cone" delivered the album's best moments, saying it is "probably the only track that's slightly less salacious than it sounds."

== Promotion ==
=== Music video ===
Although the song was not released as a single, Minaj did release a music video for the song on October 22, 2012, as a teaser to the re-release of Pink Friday: Roman Reloaded. It was directed by Grizzlee Music and released through his YouTube channel. It resembles the theme from Minaj's previous single from her debut album, Pink Friday, "Did It On'em". The video features footage from Minaj's concerts and the 2012 BET Awards, as well as appearances by Tyga, Blac Chyna, Gucci Mane, Birdman, Waka Flocka Flame, Safaree "SB" Samuels, Jay-Z, Beyoncé, Kanye West, Kim Kardashian and American Idol judge Randy Jackson.

=== Live performances ===
Minaj has performed "Come on a Cone" on the European and North American legs of her debut concert tour, the Pink Friday Tour. The song has also served as the opening number to Minaj's second concert tour, the Pink Friday: Reloaded Tour.
