= Right by My Side =

Single by Nicki Minaj featuring Chris Brown

from the album Pink Friday: Roman Reloaded
- Released: March 27, 2012
- Recorded: 2011
- Studio: Conway (Los Angeles, CA)
- Genre: Pop rap; R&B
- Length: 4:25
- Label: Young Money; Cash Money; Universal Republic
- Songwriters: Onika Maraj; Warren "Oak" Felder; Andrew "Pop" Wansel; Ester Dean; Jameel Roberts; Ronald "Flippa" Colson
- Producer: Pop & Oak

Nicki Minaj singles chronology
"Starships" (2012)	"Right by My Side" (2012)	"Take It to the Head" (2012)

Chris Brown singles chronology
"Birthday Cake" (2012)	"Right by My Side" (2012)	"Take It to the Head" (2012)

Music video
- "Right By My Side" (feat. Chris Brown) on YouTube

"Right by My Side" is a song by rapper Nicki Minaj featuring American singer Chris Brown. It was released on March 27, 2012, by Young Money, Cash Money, and Universal Republic as the second single from Minaj's second album, Pink Friday: Roman Reloaded (2012). The song was written by Ester Dean and Minaj, while production was handled by Pop & Oak.

Musically, "Right by My Side" is an upbeat ballad infused with elements of pop. It was compared to several other songs, including Jordin Sparks's "No Air", in which Brown was featured, Rihanna's "You da One", and even Minaj's own track "Right Thru Me". Critics noted the song's "bubbly" persona, as well as its high-quality production. Minaj performed the song live for the first time on 106 & Park on April 3, 2012, and also performed the single during her surprise appearance at the Nokia Lumia 900 launch in Times Square.

"Right by My Side" was serviced to Rhythmic and Urban radio on its release date. It peaked at number 51 on the Billboard Hot 100, hit 5 other charts (peaking at number 17 on the US Rhythmic charts, its highest position), and received double platinum certification by the Recording Industry Association of America (RIAA).

== Background and composition ==
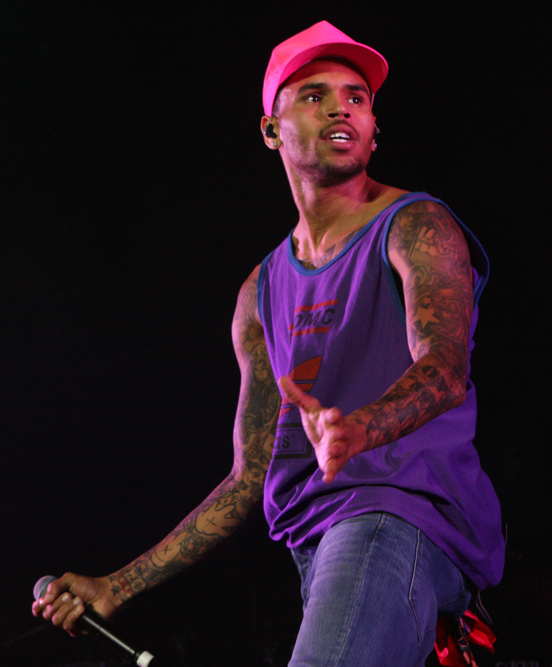
Chris Brown (pictured) appears on the song.

In an interview with Ryan Seacrest, Minaj said about the song: "Toward the end of the album I wanted something more melodic that I could give to urban radio and that pop radio could enjoy as well. I actually had the beats for like 3 months just sitting in my computer and then I said, 'You know what? This sounds like a summer, R&B classic joint' and I just could not hear anyone else on it but Chris Brown. So I reached out to Ester Dean and I said, 'Could you write something for Chris Brown?' Because she's amazing with writing and especially for his voice, she has a great skill to write for his tone and she sent it, I fell in love with it, you know 'cause everybody has had a relationship like this song is talking about, [so] I went in and I wrote my rap, cause I'm rapping and singing in the song, and when we put it all together and let people hear it, everybody was like, this is a hit, release this ASAP."

"Right by My Side" is an upbeat take on a downtempo ballad. The song is also heavily influenced by pop, and features a "glossy", "bubbly" production. Some critics found similarities between "Right by My Side" and other songs by fellow female R&B artists, specifically Jordin Sparks and Rihanna. Both Justin Ray and Andrew Hampp of Billboard found the lyrics and themes similar to those of Sparks 2008 single "No Air" which also featured Brown, Andrew Unterberger of Popdust felt the song was a more successful version of Rihanna's "You da One".

== Critical reception ==
Andrew Hampp of Billboard said the song sounded "sonically similar to Jordin Sparks and Brown's 'No Air'", and complimented Minaj for letting her guard down. Jesal Padania of Rap Reviews criticized the song for being weak, as well as commenting on the choice to release it as a single, saying, "I guess they choose star power over star quality." Andrew Martin of Prefix Magazine was disappointed that the song featured almost no rapping, and called it another "soft-as-hell ballad". In a separate article, Justin Ray of Billboard gave a positive review of the song and praised Brown's verse.

== Chart performance ==
Upon being released, "Right by My Side" entered the US Hot R&B/Hip-Hop Songs chart at 52 in its opening week, and peaked at 21 on the chart. "Right by My Side" debuted and peaked at 51 in the Billboard Hot 100. The song also peaked at number 70 on the UK Singles Chart on the week ending June 17, 2012.

== Music video ==
Filming for the music video began on April 28, 2012 and ended the next morning. It features Nas as Nicki Minaj's love interest. In the video, Minaj dons a blonde wig. The video consists mainly of the duo enjoying each other's company, featuring scenes such as the two of them going shopping, holding hands, hugging, or Nicki jumping into Nas' arms in joy. There are also cutaway scenes of Chris Brown singing, Nicki Minaj and Chris Brown singing together against a grey background, and Nas looking stressed as Nicki raps about arguing. The music video, which was directed by Benny Boom, was released on May 16, 2012.

== Live performances ==
Minaj performed "Right by My Side" live for the first time on April 3, 2012, on 106 & Park, along with "Beez in the Trap", "Roman Reloaded", "HOV Lane", "I Am Your Leader", "Champion", and "Fire Burns". She also surprised fans by performing the single for the launch of Nokia Lumia 900 in Times Square on April 6, 2012. Minaj performed the song in a mash-up with "Starships" on The Ellen DeGeneres Show on May 10, 2012. Minaj performed "Right by My Side" live during Radio 1's Hackney Weekend on June 23, 2012, as part of the line-up on the main stage.

== Charts ==
Chart (2012)	Peak position
Ireland (IRMA)	97
France (SNEP)	122
UK Singles (Official Charts)	70
US Billboard Hot 100	51
US Hot R&B/Hip-Hop Songs (Billboard)	21
US Rhythmic Airplay (Billboard)	17

=== Year-end charts ===
Chart (2012)	Position
US Hot R&B/Hip-Hop Songs	77

== Certifications ==
Certifications for "Right By My Side"
Region	Certification	Certified units/sales
Australia (ARIA)	Platinum	70,000^{‡}
Brazil (Pro-Música Brasil)	Platinum	60,000^{‡}
New Zealand (RMNZ)	Gold	15,000^{‡}
United Kingdom (BPI)	Silver	200,000^{‡}
United States (RIAA)	2× Platinum	2,000,000^{‡}
^{‡} Sales+streaming figures based on certification alone.

== Radio release history ==
Region	Date	Format	Label
United States	March 27, 2012	Rhythmic and Urban radio	Young Money Entertainment
