= Whip It (Nicki Minaj song) =

Song by Nicki Minaj

from the album Pink Friday: Roman Reloaded
- Released: April 2, 2012
- Recorded: 2012
- Studio: Conway Studios, Los Angeles, California
- Genre: Eurodance; Euro disco; Europop; hip-hop
- Length: 3:15
- Label: Young Money; Cash Money; Universal Republic
- Songwriters: Onika Maraj; Nadir Khayat; Alex Papaconstantinou; Björn Djupström; Bilal Hajji; Wayne Hector
- Producers: RedOne; Alex P.

Audio video
- "Whip It" on YouTube

"Whip It" is a song by rapper Nicki Minaj, taken from her second album Pink Friday: Roman Reloaded (2012). It was written by Minaj, RedOne, Alex Papaconstantinou, Björn Djupström, Bilal Hajji, and Hector and produced by RedOne and Papaconstantinou. "Whip It" is a Eurodance song that utilizes musical genres such as Europop and Euro disco, while also being influenced by other genres such as Latin freestyle, electronic dance, techno and electro. Lyrically, the song is about an attraction to somebody at a club.

The song charted in Canada, Japan, the UK and US the week after the album's release. In the US, it peaked at number 23 on the Bubbling Under Hot 100 chart. Minaj performed the song for the first time at iHeartRadio's Wango Tango.

== Background and recording ==
Following the success of Minaj's debut album, Pink Friday, Cash Money co-CEO, Brian "Birdman" Williams announced to Billboard that Minaj was aiming for a first quarter release in 2012. In November 2011, Minaj announced on Twitter that the album would be released on February 14, 2012, though it was later delayed to April 3, 2012. The album focuses on Roman Zolanski, one of Minaj's alter egos that was first featured on Pink Friday. "Whip It" was written by Minaj, along with Nadir Khayat, Alex Papaconstantinou, Björn Djupström, Bilal Hajji, and Wayne Hector. Production of the song was handled by RedOne, Alex P. Trevor Muzzy and Alex P were responsible for the song's recording, and they were assisted by Jon Sher. Muzzy and Ariel Chobaz mixed "Whip It" with assistance from Sher. Vocal editing of the song was handled by RedOne, Muzzy, and Alex P, while background vocals were provided by RedOne and Jeanette Olsson. Both RedOne and Alex P were solely responsible for "Whip It"'s instrumentation.

On May 24, 2012, a poll was posted on Minaj's official website asking fans to choose the next single(s). The poll was divided into three categories. The second category prompted fans to choose between "Pound the Alarm", "Whip It", and "Va Va Voom". "Va Va Voom" had the most votes and won the poll. "Whip It" came in second place and "Pound the Alarm" came in third. Moments later, Minaj tweeted: "Oop. Just got word that radio 1 in the uk and nova & 2day fm in australia are runnin w/ #poundthealarm due to the amount of requests".

== Composition ==
"Whip It" is a Eurodance, Europop, and Euro disco song produced by RedOne and Alex P. It is also influenced by other genres, such as electronic dance, Latin pop, techno, and electro. It was written by Minaj, Nadir Khayat, Alex Papaconstantinou, Björn Djupström, and Bilal Hajji. Minaj raps in a faux-English accent during the course of the song, accompanied with sounds of whips, synths, and also incorporates a guest verse she participated in on the Cassie song "Fuck U Silly". "Whip It" has drawn comparisons to several other musical artists, including Jennifer Lopez, Rihanna, Pitbull, and Britney Spears.

== Critical reception ==
Billboard editor Andrew Hampp gave the song a positive review, while calling it one of the best songs on the album, he also said "One of the better dance cuts on Roman Reloaded, 'Whip It' is good enough to make J. Lo jealous she didn't snare it as a follow-up to 'On the Floor'." Adam Graham of The Detroit News said the song made Minaj sound like a "generic dance-club diva, lost in a sea of pounding bass and EDM flourishes." Tom Ewing of The Guardian gave the song a negative review, stating that the song "mines Eurodisco trashiness so well you can almost smell the Piz Buin." Slant Magazine stated that "Whip It", along with "Starships", "Pound the Alarm" and "Automatic", are "retro-techno-pop earsores comprised of indiscriminately arranged bits of LMFAO's 'Sexy and I Know It', Rihanna's 'We Found Love', and pretty much any recent Britney Spears or Katy Perry song you can name."

== Live performances ==
Minaj performed "Whip It" for the first time at Wango Tango. Since Wango Tango, Minaj has performed "Whip It" on her Pink Friday Tour. A remixed version of the song also served as an interlude on her Pink Friday: Reloaded Tour.

== Credits and personnel ==
Recording

- Recorded at Conway Studios, Los Angeles, California.
- Mixed at Conway Studios, Los Angeles, California.

Personnel

- Songwriting – Onika Maraj, Nadir Khayat, Alex Papaconstantinou, Björn Djupström, Bilal Hajji, and Wayne Hector.
- Production – RedOne, Alex P
- Vocal recording – Trevor Muzzy, Alex P
- Vocal recording assistant – Jon Sher
- Vocal editing – RedOne, Trevor Muzzy, Alex P
- Mixing – Ariel Chobaz, Trevor Muzzy
- Mixing assistant – Jon Sher
- All instruments/programming – RedOne, Alex P
- Additional background vocals – RedOne, Jeanette Olsson

Credits adapted from the liner notes of Pink Friday: Roman Reloaded, Cash Money Records.

== Chart performance ==
Upon release of Pink Friday: Roman Reloaded, "Whip It" charted on several charts around the world.

Chart (2012)	Peak position
Australia (ARIA)	58
Canada (Canadian Hot 100)	85
Japan (Japan Hot 100)	91
UK Singles (Official Charts Company)	98
US Bubbling Under Hot 100 Singles (Billboard)	23
