= My Chick Bad =

2010 single by Nicki Minaj and Ludacris

Single by Ludacris featuring Nicki Minaj

from the album Battle of the Sexes
- Released: February 23, 2010
- Recorded: 2009
- Genre: Hip-hop; crunk
- Length: 3:37
- Label: DTP; Def Jam
- Songwriters: Christopher Bridges; Onika Maraj; Brent Haseltine; Samuel Lindley; Derrelle Davidson
- Producer: The Legendary Traxster

Ludacris singles chronology
"All I Do Is Win" (2010)	"My Chick Bad" (2010)	"Ride" (2010)

Nicki Minaj singles chronology
"Knockout" (2010)	"My Chick Bad" (2010)	"Lil Freak" (2010)

"My Chick Bad" is a song by American rapper Ludacris. The song features Nicki Minaj, who co-wrote the song with Ludacris, Samuel Lindley, and Derrelle Davidson. The track was produced by the Legendary Traxster. "My Chick Bad" serves as the second single from Ludacris' eighth album, Battle of the Sexes. An official remix to the song was also released, featuring female rappers Diamond, Eve, and Trina.

The song was a commercial success, peaking at number 11 on the Billboard Hot 100. The song reached number two on the Hot R&B/Hip-Hop Songs and Rap Songs charts, and also appeared on the Pop Songs without an official release to pop radio. "My Chick Bad" was nominated for a 2011 Grammy Award in the category Best Rap Performance by a Duo or Group. The accompanying music video for both versions of the song take place in a dungeon during the filming of a movie, with Minaj portraying a Freddy Krueger-esque character, an early incarnation of her alter-ego, Roman Zolanski.

== Background ==
In an interview with Rap-Up, on Nicki Minaj, Ludacris said, "She’s an animated female and I’m an animated rapper myself." Before it was released as a single, in the interview, he said, "That’s one of the records that we gonna put out there." The official remix features Eve, Trina, and Diamond, while Ludacris only has background vocals. The remix was also included on Battle of the Sexes, and an extension of the original video was made to accompany it. On the set of the video, Eve said, "I’m just happy that Luda got this together and made this happen. This is just a nice prelude to what’s about to happen. I think it’s about to be another movement of strong women."

== Composition ==
"My Chick Bad"
A sample of "My Chick Bad" featuring Ludacris rapping the repetitive chorus-hook, and Minaj beginning her verse.

The song carries a "thumping" and "dark" tone described as "spooky". Nathan Rabin of The A.V. Club described the song as "swaggering", and it has been called "rambunctious" by XXL. It also features the catchy hook, "My chick bad / My chick 'hood / My chick do stuff that your chick wish she could." As Ludacris's verse brags about his significant other, Minaj's as well as the females present on the remix, brag about themselves. In the song, Ludacris refers to tennis stars Venus and Serena Williams, the Tiger Woods scandal in a reference of his wife, Elin Nordegren, The Macy’s Thanksgiving Day Parade, and Homer Simpson and his signature catchphrase “D’oh!”. Minaj refers to basketball star Lisa Leslie, as well as the horror franchises A Nightmare on Elm Street and Friday the 13th, and their respective main antagonists, Freddy Krueger and Jason Voorhees.

== Critical reception ==
August Brown of the Los Angeles Times complimented "a cameo from the ever-delightful Nicki Minaj." Sarah Godfrey of The Washington Post commented that the remix version of the song was the only track on Battle of the Sexes to fully live up to the album's name and original premise. Nathan Rabin of The A.V. Club said the song provide a "vital forum for red-hot Lil Wayne protégé Nicki Minaj on the original track and Eve on the remix." XXL said: Minaj's turn at the song "proves she’s got the goods to be the perfect playmate to any of rap’s leading men." Jesal Padania of RapReviews called Minaj impressive on the song, and said the song had less energy than lead single "How Low", but more "meat."

People Magazine, Rap-Up, and Ken Capbobianco of The Boston Globe referred to the song as one of the highlights of Battle of the Sexes. Simon Vozick-Levinson of Entertainment Weekly also chose the track as two of the album's best, calling Minaj's appearance "scene-stealing". Jason Richards of Now Magazine was not impressed, calling the song "particularly gross" and called the production "bargain-basement. It was named the eighth worst song of 2010 by The Village Voice; Christopher Weingarten, writing for the publication, described the song as "loathsome", criticizing its "hashtag rap".

The song was nominated for a 2011 Grammy Award in the category Best Rap Performance by a Duo or Group, but lost to "On to the Next One" by Jay-Z and Swizz Beatz.

== Chart performance ==
On the week ending March 13, 2010, "My Chick Bad" debuted at 46 on the Billboard Hot 100. After its release to radio, followed by increasing digital sales, the song eventually continued to rise, and peaked at number 11 for two weeks. The song peaked at two on both Hot R&B/Hip-Hop Songs and Rap Songs charts. Although the song never officially went for adds on mainstream airplay, the song appeared on the Pop Songs chart at 39. As of December 2014 the song has sold 1.8 million copies in the US.

== Music video ==
Minaj sitting in a chair as Freddy Krueger and Ludacris in the director's chair.

The music video was filmed the weekend of February 6, 2010 in Miami, Florida, directed by TAJ Stansberry. Two clips were filmed, one for the original song and one for the remix version. On the set of the video, Ludacris said, "It hasn’t been this many women on the same song or the same video set in... I don’t know how long, so we making history and it feels damn good." It premiered on February 19, 2010, on BET's 106 & Park and Vevo.

The video takes place in a lair/dungeon setting, as Ludacris is directing a movie but the filming is on break. During that time Ludacris begins to brag about his "girl" towards the other cast members. Later in the video Minaj is revealed as the actress of the film, portraying a Freddy Krueger character, complete with the trademark glove made of razor blades. She is found lying in a couch, held by restraints, before the video ends with Ludacris and Nicki performing in the lair. The remix video with Diamond, Trina and Eve, also directed by TAJ, premiered on March 26, 2010, on Vevo and 106 & Park. The video is an extension of the original clip, featuring the same concept and premise. While Eve, Trina, and Diamond, make cameos near the end of the original video, Rick Ross, Lil Scrappy, DJ Khaled, Larenz Tate, and 2 Chainz make cameo appearances both clips.

== Live performances ==
The song was first performed by the duo at BET's Rip the Runway 2010, which Minaj co-hosted with The Game actor Pooch Hall. While Ludacris wore a black vest similar to in the "How Low" video, Minaj's attire was from the "My Chick Bad" video, as she donned a pink wig and similar clothing as in the Freddy Kruger-lair scene. Ludacris and Minaj performed the song at MTV's Spring Break 2010 in Acapulco, Mexico, featuring Minaj donning a blonde wig. The duo also performed the song at the BET Awards 2010 on June 27, 2010, as a part of a medley with the remix of "All I Do Is Win", featuring Ludacris in a mask, flanked by violin players, and Minaj with a spiraling blonde wig seated in a medieval chair, similar to her scene in the music video. Minaj has also recited her verse on select dates of her debut tour, the Pink Friday Tour. She has performed her verse in a medley on her Pink Friday: Reloaded Tour.

== Charts and certifications ==
=== Charts ===
Chart (2010)	Peak position
US Billboard Hot 100	11
US Hot R&B/Hip-Hop Songs (Billboard)	2
US Hot Rap Songs (Billboard)	2
US Pop Airplay (Billboard)	39
US Rhythmic Airplay (Billboard)	4

=== Year-end charts ===
Chart (2010)	Position
US Billboard Hot 100	56

=== Certifications ===
Region	Certification	Certified units/sales
New Zealand (RMNZ)	Gold	15,000^{‡}
United States (RIAA)	3× Platinum	3,000,000^{‡}
^{‡} Sales+streaming figures based on certification alone.

== Release history ==
Country	Date	Type
United States	February 23, 2010	Urban airplay
United States	March 2, 2010	Rhythmic airplay
