= Take It to the Head =

Single by DJ Khaled

Single by DJ Khaled featuring Chris Brown, Rick Ross, Nicki Minaj and Lil Wayne

from the album Kiss the Ring
- Released: March 27, 2012
- Genre: Hip hop
- Length: 4:24
- Label: We The Best; Terror Squad; Young Money; Cash Money; Universal Republic
- Songwriters: Christopher Brown; Onika Maraj; Khaled Khaled; Kevin Cossom; William Roberts; Dwayne Carter, Jr.; Andrew Harr; Jermaine Jackson; Andre Davidson; Sean Davidson
- Producers: The Runners; The Monarch

DJ Khaled singles chronology
"I'm a Boss" (2011)	"Take It to the Head" (2012)	"Cold" (2012)

Chris Brown singles chronology
"Right by My Side" (2012)	"Take It to the Head" (2012)	"Sweet Love" (2012)

Rick Ross singles chronology
"Think Like a Man" (2012)	"Take It to the Head" (2012)	"Why" (2012)

Nicki Minaj singles chronology
"Right by My Side" (2012)	"Take It to the Head" (2012)	"Beez in the Trap" (2012)

Lil Wayne singles chronology
"All Aboard" (2012)	"Take It to the Head" (2012)	"HYFR (Hell Ya Fucking Right)" (2012)

"Take It to the Head" is a song by the American hip hop producer DJ Khaled, released as the lead single from his sixth studio album, Kiss the Ring. The song features Chris Brown, Rick Ross, Lil Wayne and Nicki Minaj. The song was premiered via DJ Khaled's Twitter on March 26, 2012. It was later released for digital download in the United States on April 3, 2012. The single was certified gold by the Recording Industry Association of America (RIAA) for sales of over 500,000 digital copies. Musically, "Take It to the Head" is a hip hop song with elements of trap from Nicki Minaj, Lil Wayne and Rick Ross, and R&B from Chris Brown.

== Critical reception ==
David Jeffries highlighted it and wrote a positive description: " Nicki Minaj joins labelmate Wayne, along with Chris Brown and Rick Ross, for "Take It to the Head," a song perfect for rainy days as the lyricists go from sullen to champion over a slow-rolling Runners production." BBC music said of the single, "Single Take It to the Head, meanwhile, is oddly ineffectual considering the talent showcased. Rick Ross comes off lackadaisical, Nicki Minaj offers far from her greatest verse, a mumbling Lil Wayne's mouth sounds fuller of iced grill than usual, while Khaled hollers unselfconsciously over the whole palaver like an actual ghetto Tim Westwood." Mark Bozzer also wrote a positive review: "the Runners/Khaled-produced bachelorette party favourite, "Take It To The Head," featuring Breezy, Rozay, Nicki Minaj and Weezy." XXL panned the song noting it incapable of recapturing the magic of last album’s lead single but he also wrote that it's better than today’s average radio record: "appreciate in listening value over time."

== Music video ==
The video was filmed on April 30, 2012, inside Disaster!: A Major Motion Picture Ride...Starring You!, one of the rides in Universal Studios Florida. It was directed by Colin Tilley. It premiered on May 20, 2012, on MTV2 Sucker Free and it was uploaded on DJ Khaled's Vevo account on May 25. In addition to Khaled and the track's featured artists, the video features cameos from rappers Drake, Birdman, Busta Rhymes and Mack Maine, among others. The video takes place at The BART. Brown appears in a cage as he sings the chorus. Rick Ross performs his verse on the sidelines of the train tracks as during the verse, Drake appears. Then Minaj raps her verse sitting on the train tracks as gasoline barrels on fire behind her. Then Wayne performs on the back of a destroyed train as Busta Rhymes, Mack Maine and Birdman make small appearances during Wayne's verse.

== Remix ==
The remix features Chris Brown, Fat Joe, Ace Hood, Jae Millz, Maino, Lil Twist, T-Streets, Bun B and Lil Chuckee.

== Live performances ==
Minaj and Wayne performed the song during Minaj's Pepsi Promotional Show as a part of her Pink Friday Tour. Minaj has also recited her verse on her Pink Friday: Reloaded Tour.

== Charts ==
=== Weekly charts ===
Chart (2012)	Peak Position
UK Hip Hop/R&B (OCC)	24
US Billboard Hot 100	58
US Hot R&B/Hip-Hop Songs (Billboard)	6
US Hot Rap Songs (Billboard)	6
US Rhythmic Airplay (Billboard)	20

=== Year-end charts ===
Chart (2012)	Position
US Hot R&B/Hip-Hop Songs (Billboard)	29
US Hot Rap Songs (Billboard)	20

== Certifications ==
Region	Certification	Certified units/sales
United States (RIAA)	Platinum	1,000,000^{‡}
^{‡} Sales+streaming figures based on certification alone.

== Release history ==
List of release dates, record label and format details
Country	Date	Format	Label
United States	April 3, 2012	Digital download	We the Best, Terror Squad, Cash Money, Universal Motown
United States	March 26, 2012	Rhythmic radio	We the Best, Terror Squad, Cash Money, Universal Motown
