= Up All Night (Drake song) =

Song by Drake featuring Nicki Minaj

from the album Thank Me Later
- Released: June 14, 2010
- Recorded: 2010
- Genre: Hip hop; R&B
- Length: 3:55
- Label: Young Money; Cash Money; Motown
- Songwriters: Aubrey Graham; Onika Maraj; Matthew Samuels; Matthew Burnett
- Producers: Boi-1da; Matthew Burnett

"Up All Night" is a song by Canadian hip-hop artist, Drake from his debut album Thank Me Later. The song features label mate Nicki Minaj.

== Composition ==
The song has been labeled contemporary R&B that is topped off with menacing strings. The song also contains hints of spacey synths and clattering with reverbed percussion.

== Critical reception ==
The song gathered generally positive reviews from critics. Rap-Up stated that "Drake pledges his allegiance to the house that Wayne built on 'Up All Night,' while Nicki reps the home team to the fullest." Simon Vozick-Levinson of Entertainment Weekly called the song one of the best songs to download from the album. Glenn Gamboa of Newsday gave Minaj a positive review of the song stating "Even in the dark "Up All Night," Drake gets upstaged by Nicki Minaj." Ryan Dombal of Pitchfork Media stated, "Drake's fellow Young Money upstart Nicki Minaj adds to the gender ambiguities, out-manning her host on the diabolical 'Up All Night'". In a list of the "50 Best Songs of 2010" by Rolling Stone, "Up All Night" came in a number thirty-six additionally stating that the song is "One of the year's great driving songs, with Minaj 'doing doughnuts in a six-speed'". Chris Richards of The Washington Post gave Minaj a negative review on the song stating, "On 'Up All Night,' larger-than-life newcomer Nicki Minaj sounds drowsy." Paul Cantor of XXL gave the song a positive review stating, "And if there’s any doubt the kid can flat out spit, there are the obligatory Young Money collabs 'Up All Night' (with Nicki Minaj) and “Miss Me” (with Lil Wayne)."

== Live performances ==
Minaj has performed her verse on both her Pink Friday Tour and her Pink Friday: Reloaded Tour.

== Chart performance ==
"Up All Night" debuted and peaked at number 49 on the US Billboard Hot 100 chart. The song ended charting based on digital sales alone. The song was certified platinum by the Recording Industry Association of America (RIAA) for sales of over a million digital copies in the United States. On December 21, 2025, “Up All Night” reached No. 1 on US iTunes for the first time in 15 Years.

== Charts ==
Chart (2010–2011)	Peak position
Canada Hot 100 (Billboard)	80
German Black Chart	18
US Billboard Hot 100	49
US Hot R&B/Hip-Hop Songs (Billboard)	59
US Hot Rap Songs (Billboard)	20

== Certifications ==
Certifications for "Up All Night"
Region	Certification	Certified units/sales
Australia (ARIA)	Gold	35,000^{‡}
United Kingdom (BPI)	Silver	200,000^{‡}
United States (RIAA)	Platinum	1,000,000^{‡}
^{‡} Sales+streaming figures based on certification alone.
