= Bottoms Up (Trey Songz song) =

Single by Trey Songz featuring Nicki Minaj

from the album Passion, Pain & Pleasure
- Released: July 27, 2010
- Recorded: June 2010
- Genre: Hip hop; R&B
- Length: 4:02
- Label: Songbook; Atlantic
- Songwriters: Milton L. James; Daniel A. Johnson; Onika Maraj; Edrick Miles; Tony E. Scales
- Producer: Kane Beatz

Trey Songz singles chronology
"If It Ain't About Money" (2010)	"Bottoms Up" (2010)	"Can't Be Friends" (2010)

Nicki Minaj singles chronology
"Your Love" (2010)	"Bottoms Up" (2010)	"2012 (It Ain't the End)" (2010)

"Bottoms Up" is a song by American singer Trey Songz. It was produced by Kane Beatz and features rapper Nicki Minaj. The song serves as the lead single from his fourth studio album, Passion, Pain & Pleasure. It is his most successful single to date, peaking at number 6 on the Billboard Hot 100.

== Background ==
The song was intentionally leaked on July 13, 2010, and to celebrate the release of the song, Songz discussed the song with Minaj on Ustream.

In the webcast, Songz explained how the collaboration came together, stating:

"I'm in L.A. for BET Awards weekend, I'm working on a couple records, and I do this song called 'Red Lipstick,' and then I do 'Bottoms Up' the next day. I hit Nicki and I'm like, 'Man, I've got these two incredible records, I think one of them is gonna be my first single, and I need you to do it. Can you come this weekend? Can you come down?' I stayed a couple extra days and she came through. Two, three days later I got a verse back that was just stupid."

Songz then addressed Minaj directly, stating, "I fell in love with you. When I heard the verse, I was like, 'Oh my shit, I love her. She killed it.'" Minaj also stated that she had been asked several times when she would do a song with Trey Songz, and said when Songz contacted her, she said she thought "This is our time". When directing to Songz and also speaking to fans on her verse, the tribute to the late Anna Nicole Smith, and appearing as her alter-egos Roman Zolanski, and Harajuku Barbie, she said:

"I kept on hitting you like, 'I'mma have it done today.' I think I did live with it for, like, three days because I was changing it up, I couldn't get it. But then, all of a sudden, something just hit me. I was gonna take that part out [the Anna Nicole Smith part] because I was like, 'Trey is gonna think I'm crazy.' Roman is very spastic. Roman is crazy and Roman is weird and Roman doesn't care.... The person on DJ Khaled's 'All I Do Is Win' remix, that's Nicki, and the person on 'Bottoms Up,' that's Roman."

== Composition and critical reception ==
"Bottoms Up" features a "bass-thumping" beat. Nicki Minaj appears in the song as herself, and her alter-egos, Roman Zolanski, and Harajuku Barbie. Minaj delivers her lines as in cartoonish voices and inimitable baby-talk, distorting her voice in parts to sound tipsy. Minaj also sings breathily and references Anna Nicole Smith, and biblical figures Mary and Joseph. Like his previous song, "Say Aah", according to Chris Ryan of MTV Buzzworthy, "is about the joys of enjoying a frosty beverage at the nightclub of your choosing." Ryan also said the song had an R. Kelly vibe to it. Ryan also gave the song a positive review, stating, "Trey Songz, sex inventor. Nicki Minaj, Harajuku Barbie. A duet between the two. It's getting hot in herre." WERQ-FM gave the song a positive review, commending Minaj's cameo. BET Sound Off said, "two of the hottest things in the industry have teamed up for what might be a contender for the hottest joint of the 2010 Summer", commenting, "THIS ish right here is the perfect anthem for happy hour, the end of a hard day at work or even a stressful situation. Maybe it's the pounding kicks that keep my head nodding. Or, maybe it's the infectious hook 'Bottoms Up, Bottoms Up.'" Andy Kellman of AllMusic called it "shamelessly mindless". Mariel Concepcion of Billboard gave the song a positive review, praising Minaj's role, stating, Songz' part "fades in to the background" and that "Minaj steals the spotlight with a layered, almost cartoonish 16-bar verse that injects the track with much-needed liveliness and creativity", showing "more personality in 45 seconds than most rappers do in an entire song, balancing an aggressive attitude with her gentler side." The Washington Post's Sean Fennessey described the song as "gleeful, kinetic" and viewed that Songz is outperformed by Minaj, writing "[she] supplies a brilliant extended cameo on the song, and as she has on nearly all of her guest appearances this year, changes tempo, tone and persona in thrilling flashes".

"Bottoms Up" is set in common time with a moderate tempo of 82 and is in the key of C minor.

== Music video ==
The music video was directed by Anthony Mandler and filmed on July 31, 2010. A sneak peek to the music video was released August 16, 2010. The video provides dark, carnival-esque visuals to this club record.

Trey commented on the music video in an interview with MTV stating, "'Bottoms Up,' I feel, is a very creative video. [It's] different from the norm, different than what I feel is expected of me and anything I've shot for that matter. It's as if I'm walking through some kind of funhouse, filled with women and different seductive things. The music video premiered on August 17, 2010 on 106 & Park while Songz hosted the show with Rocsi."

The video premiered on BET's 106 & Park on August 17, 2010. The video features Trey Songz walking around and performing in front of girls who are behind glass walls dancing erotically. Throughout the video Trey sits on chairs and holds bottles of alcohol. Right before Nicki's verse, Trey is seen in a club with the girls that were behind the glass. Nicki performs her verse as her alter-egos Roman and Barbie, in a corner of a room and as one of the girls behind the glass windows with belts. The entire verse is shown in a spastic movement until the end of her verse where she grabs her breasts and yells at the camera. By the end of the video Trey is shirtless and Nicki flirts promiscuously towards the camera. The video ends with Nicki/Roman/Barbie blowing a kiss at Trey.

== Live performances ==
Minaj has performed her verse on her Pink Friday Tour and her Pink Friday: Reloaded Tour.

== Charts ==
=== Weekly charts ===
Weekly chart performance
Chart (2010–2011)	Peak position
Australia (ARIA)	74
Belgium (Ultratip Bubbling Under Flanders)	13
Belgium (Ultratip Bubbling Under Wallonia)	34
Canada Hot 100 (Billboard)	34
Canada CHR/Top 40 (Billboard)	25
Germany Urban (Deutsche Urban Charts)	5
Scottish Singles Sales (Official Charts)	96
UK Hip Hop/R&B (Official Charts)	22
UK Singles (Official Charts)	71
US Billboard Hot 100	6
US Hot R&B/Hip-Hop Songs (Billboard)	2
US Pop Airplay (Billboard)	11
US Rhythmic Airplay (Billboard)	1

=== Year-end charts ===
Year-end chart performance
Chart (2010)	Position
US Billboard Hot 100	52
US Hot R&B/Hip-Hop Songs (Billboard)	31
US Rhythmic Airplay (Billboard)	21
Chart (2011)	Position
US Billboard Hot 100	64
US Hot R&B/Hip-Hop Songs (Billboard)	73
US Rhythmic Airplay (Billboard)	38

== Certifications ==
Region	Certification	Certified units/sales
New Zealand (RMNZ)	Platinum	30,000^{‡}
United Kingdom (BPI)	Silver	200,000^{‡}
United States (RIAA)	4× Platinum	4,000,000
^{‡} Sales+streaming figures based on certification alone.

== Release history ==
Region	Date	Format
United States	July 27, 2010	Urban airplay
United States	August 10, 2010	Digital download
United Kingdom	April 3, 2011	CD; digital download
