= Make Me Proud =

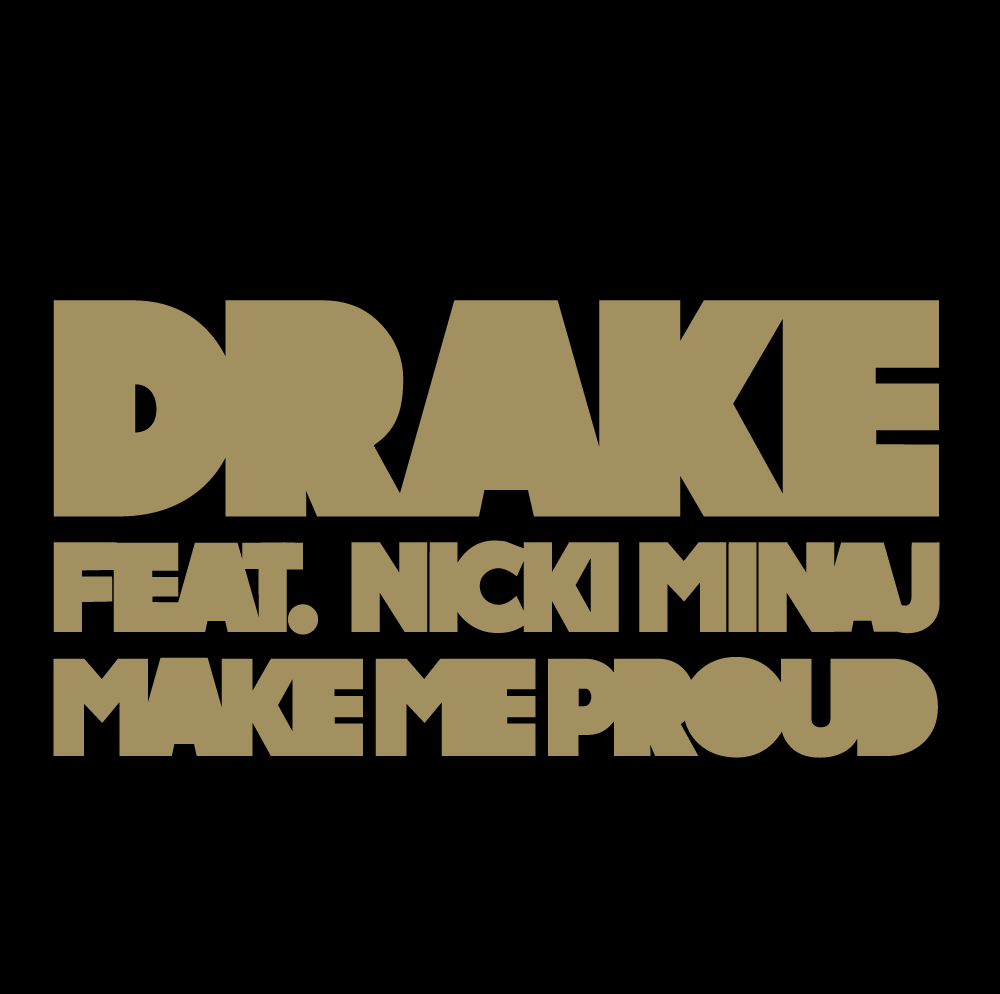

Single by Drake featuring Nicki Minaj

from the album Take Care
- Released: October 16, 2011
- Recorded: 2011
- Studio: Metalworks Studios
- Genre: Hip hop; R&B
- Length: 3:40 (Digital album version); 3:36 (Physical album version)
- Label: Young Money; Cash Money; Republic
- Songwriters: Aubrey Graham; Anthony Palman; Onika Maraj; Tyler Williams; Nikhil Seetharam; Kenza Samir; Noah Shebib
- Producers: T-Minus; Nikhil S.

Drake singles chronology
"Tony Montana" (2011)	"Make Me Proud" (2011)	"Mr. Wrong" (2011)

Nicki Minaj singles chronology
"You the Boss" (2011)	"Make Me Proud" (2011)	"Dance (Ass)" (2011)

"Make Me Proud" is a song by Canadian recording artist Drake, released as the third single from his second studio album, Take Care, featuring American rapper Nicki Minaj. It was released as a digital download on October 16, 2011 and impacted rhythmic radio on October 25, 2011 in the U.S.

== Background ==
Drake released "Make Me Proud" on his OVO blog on October 13, 2011 and earlier tweeted the song's title on September 25, 2011. The song premiered on Funk Master Flex's radio station Hot 97.

== Live performances ==
It was performed for the first time on Saturday Night Live, which aired on October 15, 2011 which also aired. Minaj has performed her verse on her debut concert tour, the Pink Friday Tour, as well as her Pink Friday: Reloaded Tour.

== Chart performance ==
On October 20, 2011, the song debuted at number 97 on the Billboard Hot 100. In its second week, it peaked at number nine on the chart. With this jump from 97–9 on the Billboard Hot 100, Drake tied Akon's 88-spot blast (95-7) with "Smack That," featuring Eminem, five years before, for biggest vault ever by a male artist on the chart. Overall, the leap of "Make Me Proud" is currently tied for the sixth largest jump of all-time on the chart. In its 15th week on the chart, the track climbed to the peak of the Billboard R&B/Hip-Hop Songs chart, becoming Drake's 8th track to peak atop of that chart in his two and a half year career. "Make Me Proud" also topped the Billboard Rap Songs chart, giving Drake the most number one rap singles of all time with 11. As of December 2014, "Make Me Proud" has sold 1.4 million copies in the United States.

== Track listing ==
Digital single

No.	Title	Writer(s)	Producer(s)	Length
1.	"Make Me Proud" (featuring Nicki Minaj)	Aubrey Graham; Onika Maraj; Tyler Williams; Nikhil Seetharam; Noah Shebib	T-Minus; Nikhil S.	3:40

== Charts ==
=== Weekly charts ===
Chart (2011–2012)	Peak position
Australia (ARIA)	95
Canada Hot 100 (Billboard)	25
Canada CHR/Top 40 (Billboard)	39
UK Hip Hop/R&B (Official Charts)	16
UK Singles (Official Charts)	49
US Billboard Hot 100	9
US Hot R&B/Hip-Hop Songs (Billboard)	1
US Rhythmic Airplay (Billboard)	8

=== Year-end charts ===
Annual chart rankings
Chart (2012)	Position
US Hot R&B/Hip-Hop Songs (Billboard)	10
US Rap Songs (Billboard)	7
US Ringtones (Billboard)	18
US Rhythmic (Billboard)	30

== Certifications ==
Region	Certification	Certified units/sales
Australia (ARIA)	Platinum	70,000^{‡}
New Zealand (RMNZ)	Gold	15,000^{‡}
United Kingdom (BPI)	Gold	400,000^{‡}
United States (RIAA)	Platinum	1,400,000
^{‡} Sales+streaming figures based on certification alone.

== Release history ==
Region	Date	Format
United States	October 16, 2011	Digital download
Canada	October 16, 2011	Digital download
United Kingdom	October 23, 2011	Digital Download
United States	October 25, 2011	Rhythmic contemporary airplay
United States	November 1, 2011	Urban contemporary airplay

== See also ==
- List of number-one R&B singles of 2012 (U.S.)
- List of number-one rap singles of 2012 (U.S.)
