= Roman Holiday (song) =

2012 song by Nicki Minaj

Song by Nicki Minaj

from the album Pink Friday: Roman Reloaded
- Released: April 2, 2012
- Recorded: 2011–2012
- Studio: Conway, Los Angeles
- Genre: Hip hop; pop rap; R&B
- Length: 4:06
- Label: Young Money; Cash Money; Universal Republic
- Songwriters: Onika Maraj; Winston Thomas; Larry Nacht; Safaree Samuels
- Producer: Blackout

Audio video
- "Roman Holiday" on YouTube

"Roman Holiday" is a song by rapper Nicki Minaj from her second studio album, Pink Friday: Roman Reloaded (2012). It was written by Minaj, producer Winston Thomas, Larry Nacht and Safaree Samuels. Two months prior to the album's release, Minaj performed a rendition of the song at the 54th Grammy Awards ceremony on February 12, 2012, which received controversy from the Catholic Church for the usage of religious imagery. Minaj was the first solo female rapper to perform at the Grammys.

The song charted at number 13 on the US Bubbling Under Hot 100. In 2019, it was used in internet memes, which launched "Roman Holiday" to the top of the iTunes Rap/Hip-Hop Songs chart. In 2023, the song went viral again due to a protest against the Grammys and peaked at number nine on the Digital Song Sales chart, number two on the R&B/Hip-Hop Digital Song Sales chart, and number one on the Rap Digital Song Sales chart, its highest position on the charts.

== Composition ==
"Roman Holiday"
Minaj switches between her fast-paced alter ego, Roman Zolanski to his mother, Martha, during this 30 second sample of "Roman Holiday"'s chorus.

"Roman Holiday" is a fast-paced hip-hop and pop rap song influenced by opera music that runs for four minutes and five seconds. It features complex production, utilizing elements such as rattling sound effects, sonic drops, synths, and lasers. The chorus is sung by singer Marissa Bregman. The song also references the traditional hymn "Oh Come All Ye Faithful".

"Roman Holiday" features one of Minaj's alter egos, Roman, which she debuted live in her Grammy Award performance. The song follows the Roman-focused "Roman in Moscow". Minaj said that the character's narrative role involved attempts to rehabilitate him.

== Critical reception ==
Jessica Hopper, from Spin magazine, called the song "nearly flawless" and "pure theater, the closest hip-hop's gotten to its own 'Bohemian Rhapsody', full of thrilling crescendos and twitchy verses that verge on the ridiculous, but always shift toward the triumphant." She described the song as part of the "gratifying front end (of the album)" and dismissed "subsequent pop tracks as a paying of the piper": "The too-perfect, Dr. Luke-produced songs are her penance for sneaking deranged yodeling ode 'Roman Holiday' in there." Jim Farber of New York Daily News praised the song's style and philosophy: "The peak parts of the star's second CD, Pink Friday: Roman Reloaded, turn that trend smack on its back. The rhythms, textures and inflections of the best tracks far outfreak, and outwit, any get-up the star has ever sported. Take the opening cut, 'Roman Holiday'. When Minaj previewed this ditty on the Grammys back in February, her zany (some said blasphemous) theatrics obscured the originality of both the beat and of Minaj's rapping attack. On the disk, you can bask in her fitful, stuttering style—a manic cadence informed by its own grace. In the space of one track, Minaj mixes pitches and flows to create as much rhythmic surprise as a top comic. Using the persona of Roman Zolanski—the most amped-up gay man imaginable—Minaj unleashes a great spew of profane humor. She matches that to vocal and percussive rhythms that meld a Trinidadian patois, a New York attitude and a hip hop bounce. Such a pan-cultural swirl shoots Missy Elliott's brand of hip-hop surreality to the moon."

Jody Rosen of Rolling Stone, said "Nicki Minaj is a purist's nightmare. She doesn't just straddle pop categories, she dumps them in a Cuisinart, whips them to a frothy purée, then trains a guided missile at the whole mess." To illustrate his point, Rosen went on to describe "Roman Holiday": "(The album) Roman Reloaded opens with Minaj – a biracial woman from Queens via Trinidad – ranting in the voice of her (Polish?) homosexual 'twin brother' alter ego. In the same song, she takes on the voice of Martha Zolanski, Roman's mother, singing in a cartoon Cockney accent. 'Take your medication, Roman,' counsels Minaj/Martha. 'Quack, quack to a duck and a chicken, too/Put the hyena in a freakin' zoo,' answers Minaj/ Roman. Later, she bursts into 'O Come, All Ye Faithful.'" Al Fox of the BBC said of Minaj: "Few artists in Minaj's position would dare to take risks as bold as this", while citing "Roman Holiday" for its "Major-key, tap-along pop sensibilities; disquieting lyrical content; wide-eyed, over-pronounced Valley Girl patter; a reworking of O Come All Ye Faithful; shuddering, skeletal beats." AllMusic's David Jeffries lists "Roman Holiday" as a "Track Pick", while Rolling Stone named the song a "Key Track" on the album.

== Live performances ==
=== 54th Grammy Awards performance ===
"Roman Holiday" made its debut on February 12, 2012, at the 54th Annual Grammy Awards. It was the first song ever performed on the Grammy stage by a solo female rapper.

Minaj said in an interview with Rap-Up, "the Grammys chose 'Roman Holiday'. The producers of the Grammys came to the studio and I played them 'Roman Holiday', and I could not play them another record after they heard that. They went crazy. I could have chosen to do a no-brainer pop song, but I can't do it anymore. I have to stay true to what I'm doing."

==== Reception ====
MTV said Minaj's "Roman Holiday" "was the most elaborate of the night's Grammy performances and (had) everyone talking", with AllHipHop founder Chuck Creekmur adding, "I definitely felt like she was reaching out to the mainstream with this performance, trying to make that full leap into the pop world. She'll definitely have people talking. Obviously, we've seen this before with Madonna and Lady Gaga—especially Gaga." Rolling Stone's Steve Knopper called the performance "disturbing, but still somehow great." David Marchese of Spin described it as an "awesomely outlandish phantasmagoria."

Bill Donahue of the conservative watch group, The Catholic League, criticized the performance, stating: "Whether Minaj is possessed is surely an open question, but what is not in doubt is the irresponsibility of The Recording Academy." Choreographer Laurieann Gibson, however, said "I personally chose to stay away from any religious moves. There were no crosses. There were no religious symbols. We made sure we were very respectable. The bishop was a symbolic figurehead. He was not [intended] in a negative light, but in a position of authority." Minaj told Ryan Seacrest "It's the most comfortable I've ever been onstage in my entire life." She told radio station Power 105.1 "[Roman Holiday] was my best performance ever ... But can I say something, I did a skit on my 'Right Thru Me', I did a skit on 'Moment 4 Life' video, I did a fighting scene in my 'Fly' video. That was the skit for the 'Roman Holiday' video, it goes perfectly for the song, what don't y'all understand?".

In 2015, longtime Grammy producer Kenneth Ehrlich criticized the performance:

I was not proud of what we did with Nicki Minaj three years ago. I thought that was a disappointment both in terms of what we did and to an extent what she did. I'm not going to absolve us of any responsibility, but it just wasn't good. If it had been controversial and good, I think I would have been proud of it. But we probably let out the string a little too much on that one.

On February 4, 2019, it was reported that singer Ariana Grande would not be performing at or attending the 61st Annual Grammy Awards due to a dispute with Ehrlich. On February 7, Grande alleged that Ehrlich stifled her creativity and tried to stipulate what song she could perform. She then later said that Ehrlich "lied" and she could "pull together a performance over night." Shortly after, Minaj defended Grande and alleged that Ehrlich "bullied" her over her 2012 "Roman Holiday" performance. She later stated on Twitter: "I was bullied into staying quiet for 7 years out of fear. But I'll tell my fans the REAL on the next episode of #QueenRadio they deserve the truth."

Minaj elaborated further on Queen Radio, explaining that the Grammy Award Show producers had approved of her performance of "Roman Holiday" and she was being featured heavily in the Recording Academy's ad campaign for the upcoming show. Whitney Houston had died one day before the show, and for an unknown reason Ehrlich used this passing to ask Minaj to cancel her performance while she was in her dressing room getting ready to perform. Minaj declined because of all the ads she had done for the Grammys and she did not want to let her fans down. Due to this disagreement with the Grammys producers and backlash to her religious-inspired theatrical performance from the Catholic Church, Minaj said that she was blackballed from winning an award and that she has seen similar stories happen to other artists.

=== Other performances ===
Minaj also performed the song on select dates of her Pink Friday Tour and her Pink Friday: Reloaded Tour.

== In popular culture ==
From early 2019, "Roman Holiday" became a popular meme on Twitter and TikTok, thanks to Minaj's "animated performance and rapid fire verses" in the song. PopBuzz noted that given how "manic the song is, it's the perfect template for any meme". A typical meme of the song would include any unrelated or sped up video, with "Roman Holiday" playing in the background, mainly if someone is escaping or rushing out. The meme caused a 298% surge in streams, and saw it soar to number one on the iTunes Rap/Hip Hop chart in mid-May. In February 2023, the song reached #1 on the Billboard Rap Digital sales chart.

== Personnel ==
Credits are taken from Pink Friday: Roman Reloaded liner notes.

- Vocals: Nicki Minaj, Marissa Bregman
- Recording: Ariel Chobaz
  - Assisted by: John Sher
- Mix engineer: Ariel Chobaz
  - Assisted by: Lyttleton "Cartwheel" Carter
- Additional vocals: Marissa Bregman
- Producing: Blackout

== Charts ==
Chart performance for "Roman Holiday"
Chart (2012)	Peak position
US Bubbling Under Hot 100 (Billboard)	13

Chart performance for "Roman Holiday"
Chart (2023)	Peak position
US Digital Song Sales (Billboard)	9
US R&B/Hip-Hop Digital Song Sales (Billboard)	2
US Rap Digital Song Sales (Billboard)	1
