= Pink Friday: Reloaded Tour =

2012 concert tour by Nicki Minaj

- Tour by Nicki Minaj
- Promotional poster for the tour
- Location: Europe • Oceania • Asia
- Associated album: Pink Friday: Roman Reloaded – The Re-Up
- Start date: October 21, 2012
- End date: December 28, 2012
- Legs: 3
- No. of shows: 18
- Box office: $5 million

Nicki Minaj concert chronology
- Pink Friday Tour (2012); Pink Friday: Reloaded Tour (2012); The Pinkprint Tour (2015–2016)

The Pink Friday: Reloaded Tour was the second concert tour and the first arena tour by the American rapper Nicki Minaj in support of her second album Pink Friday: Roman Reloaded and its re-release Pink Friday: Roman Reloaded – The Re-Up. It followed the Pink Friday Tour.

The tour began in Nottingham, England on October 21, 2012, and concluded on December 28, 2012, in Dubai. The tour received generally favorable reviews from critics, praising the vibe and the production.

== Background and development ==
It was announced via Minaj's Twitter account that British singer-songwriter Misha B would be opening for her in the United Kingdom and that Tyga, Minaj's Young Money label mate, would be an opening act for the European and Oceania legs for the tour as well.

On August 1, 2012, Minaj announced that the tour would start later than planned and that the October dates in Australia, Paris, the Netherlands, Switzerland, and Belgium would be affected. Minaj stated that the reason she had to postpone these dates were because she was working on a "secret project," later revealed to be American Idol. She also stated that international scheduling conflicts would also affect European dates.

Tyga, who was planned to be the opening act for both Australia and New Zealand announced that he had cancelled his appearance in New Zealand due to complications with travel arrangements. He apologized the same night, but Live Nation confirmed he would still appear as an opening act for the Australian concerts. New Zealand artist Zowie and DJ Tim Phin replaced him for the New Zealand performance.

== Critical reception ==
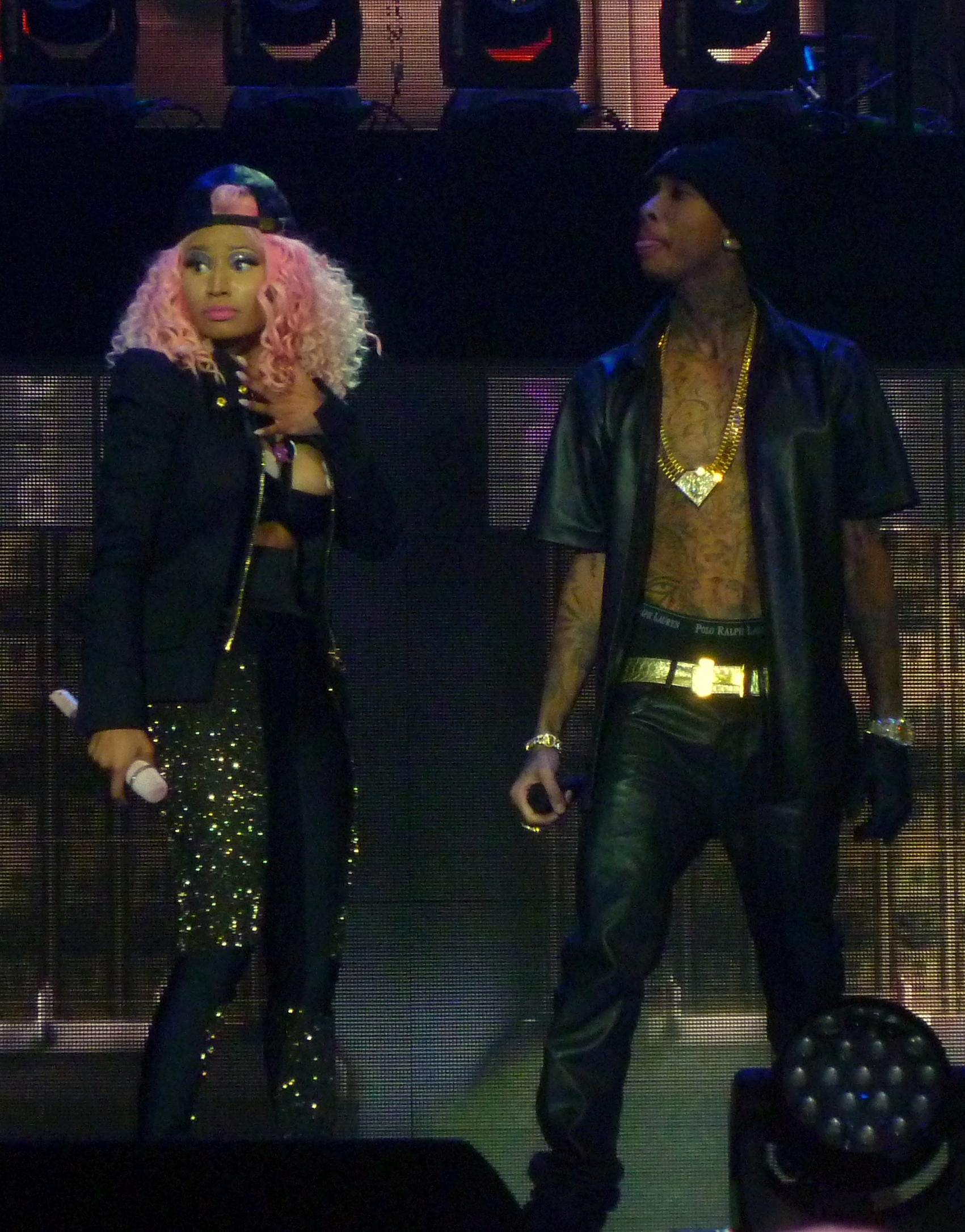
Minaj and Tyga performing

The tour received generally positive reviews. For the opening of the tour, This Is Nottingham gave the tour a mixed review. They praised the opening acts along with the dancers and production settings, but didn't give it a positive nor negative review towards Minaj. They noted Minaj's late progress in the show, with her DJ "d[oing] his best to fill, but his call-and-response routines did wear thin at times." Because of this, they noted the DJ's were "running out of tricks", due to her amount of late progress. However, overall they stated "If Nicki Minaj can hold onto that realness and nurture her on-stage connection with her ever-loving fanbase, even as the venues grow in size, then her biggest tour to date could just turn out to be her greatest triumph yet." Sutherland Echo reviewed her Newcastle performance positively. Katy Wheeler from the publication stated she delivered an "electrifying" performance and stated "With all the madcap bouffants, crazy clothing and cartoon-esque faces, it's easy to forget that Nicki actually has a cracking voice [...] But it shone as she worked her way through a catalogue of infectiously good hits to the backdrop of a slick and expensive-looking set. André Paine from Standard awarded the performance at the O2 Arena, London, four stars out of five, praising her performance and vocal ability, with songs "Fire Burns", "Beez in the Trap", and "Super Bass" as being examples.

For the opening of the Australasian leg, the tour received favorable reviews. Jess Etheridge from Stuff.co.nz reviewed her New Zealand concert, and gave it a positive review. She described her rapping structure and techniques "electrifying and breathtaking." She also praised her "interactions with the crowd showed how funny and natural she is, which was refreshing." However, she did point out her "Long costume changes without any entertainment on stage, such as dancers, made the show feel disjointed and slowed the momentum." However, Damien Grant from The New Zealand Herald also reviewed the same location, and gave it a mixed-to-favorable review. First, he was critical on her performance because he felt that the audience wanted Roman (Minaj's alter ego) and said that when they heard Nicki than Roman "they were ecstatic." He also felt that most songs were "truncated" and felt that the production "drowned her." However, he was positive towards her rapping and vocal delivery and stated it was a "good night, but was too short" and concluded "Engaging but not enthralling." However, Shandelle Battersb from the same publication reviewed the same place and gave it a positive review, writing "Minaj delivered an almost perfect pop show, high in theatrics with excellent stage effects – including some alarmingly large fireballs – and dripping with diversity and talent."

== Opening acts ==
- Tyga
- Young Rich
- Misha B

=== Musicians ===
- Nicki Minaj - Main Performer, Vocals
- Omar Edwards - Musical Direction
- Adam Blackstone - Musical Direction
- Devine Evans - Music Programmer, Composer

== Setlist ==
This setlist is representative of the show in Brisbane. It does not represent all concerts during the tour.

1. "Come on a Cone"
2. "Roman Reloaded"
3. "Beez in the Trap"
4. "Did It On'em"
5. "Up All Night" / "Make Me Proud"
6. "Moment 4 Life"
7. "The Boys"
8. "Muny" / "Raining Men" / "Dance (A$$)"
9. "Va Va Voom"
10. "Super Bass"
11. "Right Thru Me"
12. "Fire Burns"
13. "Save Me"
14. "Marilyn Monroe"
15. "Automatic"
16. "Pound the Alarm"
17. "Turn Me On"
18. "Take It to the Head" / "Mercy" / "Monster" / "Hold Yuh" / "Letting Go (Dutty Love)" / "Bottoms Up" / "Out of My Mind" / "I Luv Dem Strippers"
19. "Roman Holiday"
20. "Roman's Revenge"
21. "My Chick Bad" / "Go Hard" / "Itty Bitty Piggy"
22. "Freedom"
23. "I'm Legit"

Encore

24. "Starships"

== Tour dates ==
| Date | City | Country | Venue | Opening Act | Attendance | Revenue |
|---|---|---|---|---|---|---|
Europe
| October 21, 2012 | Nottingham | England | Capital FM Arena | Tyga; Misha B | —N/a | —N/a |
| October 22, 2012 | Manchester | England | Manchester Arena | Tyga; Misha B | 18,589 / 22,349 | $1,173,330 |
| October 24, 2012 | Liverpool | England | Echo Arena | Tyga; Misha B | —N/a | —N/a |
| October 25, 2012 | Newcastle | England | Metro Radio Arena | Tyga; Misha B | —N/a | —N/a |
| October 27, 2012 | Birmingham | England | LG Arena | Tyga; Misha B | —N/a | —N/a |
| October 28, 2012 | Newcastle upon Tyne | England | Metro Radio Arena | Tyga; Misha B | —N/a | —N/a |
| October 30, 2012 | London | England | The O_{2} Arena | Tyga; Misha B | 15,892 / 17,163 | $1,116,140 |
| November 2, 2012 | Manchester | England | Manchester Arena | Tyga; Misha B | (Note: The score data is combined from the shows held at the Manchester Arena from October 18 and November 2, 2012, respectively.) | |
| November 3, 2012 | Sheffield | England | Motorpoint Arena Sheffield | Tyga; Misha B | —N/a | —N/a |
| November 5, 2012 | Dublin | Ireland | The O_{2} | Tyga; Misha B | —N/a | —N/a |
| November 7, 2012 | Cardiff | Wales | Motorpoint Arena Cardiff | Tyga; Misha B | —N/a | —N/a |
Oceania
| November 24, 2012 | Auckland | New Zealand | Vector Arena | Zowie | —N/a | —N/a |
| November 27, 2012 | Adelaide | Australia | Adelaide Entertainment Centre | Tyga | —N/a | —N/a |
| November 30, 2012 | Sydney | Australia | Sydney Entertainment Centre | Tyga | 8,760 / 9,150 | $959,982 |
| December 3, 2012 | Brisbane | Australia | Brisbane Entertainment Centre | Tyga | 4,803 / 5,819 | $569,994 |
| December 5, 2012 | Melbourne | Australia | Rod Laver Arena | Tyga | 7,575 / 8,031 | $899,466 |
| December 8, 2012 | Perth | Australia | Perth Arena | Tyga | 6,764 / 6,780 | $710,103 |
Asia
| December 28, 2012 | Dubai | United Arab Emirates | Meydan Racecourse | —N/a | —N/a | —N/a |
| Total | | | | | 62,383 / 69,292 (90.02%) | $5,429,015 |

Rescheduled shows

| October 3, 2012 | Brisbane, Australia | Brisbane Entertainment Centre | Rescheduled to December 3, 2012 |
| October 5, 2012 | Sydney, Australia | Sydney Entertainment Centre | Rescheduled to November 30, 2012 |
| October 6, 2012 | Melbourne, Australia | Rod Laver Arena | Rescheduled to December 5, 2012 |
| October 9, 2012 | Perth, Australia | Perth Arena | Rescheduled to December 8, 2012 |
| October 18, 2012 | Brussels, Belgium | Forest National | Cancelled |
| October 28, 2012 | Auckland, New Zealand | Vector Arena | Rescheduled to November 24, 2012 |

== Personnel ==
- Dancers – Sara Bivens, Jae Fusz, Anthony Garza, Tiffany Simon, Cara Horibe, Karen Chuang, Kelsey Park, and George Jones
- Background singers – LeKeisha Renee Lewis and Candace Marie Wakefield
- Choreographers – Laurieann Gibson, Young Rich, Onika Maraj, and George Jones Jr
- Creative design – Onika Maraj, Josh Thomas and Laurieann Gibson
- DJs – DJ Headache (Main) and DJ Tim Phin (Select dates)
