= Stupid Hoe =

2011 song by Nicki Minaj

Promotional single by Nicki Minaj

from the album Pink Friday: Roman Reloaded
- A-side: "Starships"
- Released: December 20, 2011
- Recorded: 2011
- Studio: Conway Recording Studios (Los Angeles, CA)
- Genre: Bounce
- Length: 3:16
- Label: Cash Money
- Songwriters: Onika Maraj; Tina Dunham
- Producer: DJ Diamond Kuts

"Stupid Hoe" (or its radio edited title "Stupid Stupid") is a song by rapper Nicki Minaj. The song was written by Minaj and DJ Diamond Kuts, the latter of which handled the production. It was released through Cash Money Records on December 20, 2011, from Minaj's second album, Pink Friday: Roman Reloaded (2012), two weeks after the release of the album's first promotional single "Roman in Moscow".

Following the release of Pink Friday: Roman Reloaded, critics suggested that the track may have contained attacks directed at Lil' Kim due to many of the song's derogatory lyrics. Kim later suggested in an interview with 105's Breakfast Club that the song "Automatic" was similar to her unreleased material, also calling Minaj "obnoxious and catty". The song received generally negative reviews from most music critics.

An accompanying music video for the song was shot and directed by Hype Williams. The video created what is now known as the Vevo Record which is based on the number of people who have viewed a music video in its first 24 hours of its release on Vevo. In the following week of the song's release, it debuted on the Billboard Hot 100 at number 81. After the video's release, the song peaked at number 59. It also charted in Canada and the United Kingdom and was certified Gold in Australia and Platinum in the US.

== Background and composition ==
"Stupid Hoe"
An 18 second sample of the song's chorus.

"Stupid Hoe" is described as an anthem to Minaj's female haters. The song has a minimal arrangement of double-quick drum claps and strange squeaking sound effects, with Minaj performing in a quick rapping style. In the song, Minaj hints at her performance at the Super Bowl XLVI halftime show in the lines "Put ya cape on, you a super hoe/2012, I'm at the Super Bowl." Minaj also references Brad Pitt, Angelina Jolie, Michael Jackson, Roman Polanski, and Jennifer Aniston. Compared to previous mixtape release "I Get Crazy" by Erika Ramirez of Billboard, Minaj continues to make insults, stating "Bitch talkin' she the queen when she looking like lab rat", only to later sing in the song's outro "Stupid hoes is my enemy/ Stupid hoes is so wack/ Stupid hoe should have be-friended me/ Then she could have probably came back." Minaj growls ferociously as she states "These bitches is my sons and I don't want custody!" The song features Minaj singing the words "stupid hoe" in falsetto vocals. Vocally, Minaj performs her verses in different pitches, slowing down and speeding up her bars and stretching out some syllables, similar to the remix of Big Sean's single "Dance (A$$)". In the song's chorus, her intonation makes her appear to be singing "You a stupid how", rather than "You a stupid hoe", without the typical American English pronunciation. The song ends with Minaj stating "I am the female Weezy", a line borrowed from her past feature "Y.U. Mad" with Lil Wayne and Birdman.

== Critical reception ==
Rap-Up stated that Minaj comes out with "guns blazing" in the single, noting the thinly veiled shots at Lil' Kim, stating "the fire has been reignited". Describing the song as a diss track, Robbie Daw complimented Minaj's "rhyming acrobatics" as "interesting" and joked about daring to call the song "cute". Erika Ramirez of Billboard gave the song a positive review, comparing it to Minaj's previous mixtape sounds such as "I Get Crazy".

Michael Cragg of The Guardian states that "Stupid Hoe" features one-liners that "tend to work well as part of a frantic cameo on someone else's song, but here it sounds more like she's run out of ideas." While commenting that the song sounds like something from an early mixtape, Cragg favored the song's production. Mike Barthel of The Village Voice described the song as "weak" while taking into account that the song stands as a diss track. Barthel went on to compliment the track itself as minimal, loud, and aggressive, but showed a disregard for the song's structure as a diss track towards Lil' Kim, stating that past features and leaked tracks stand strong against "Stupid Hoe". Demetria L. Lucas of VIBE Vixen negatively described the song as "just plain... stupid", when compared to stronger tracks such as "Monster" and the Eminem-assisted "Roman's Revenge".

== Music video ==
=== Background and synopsis ===
The music video for "Stupid Hoe" was directed by Hype Williams and shot on December 19 and 20, 2011. It was released via Minaj's Vevo on January 20, 2012. Prior to the video's release, Minaj revealed via Twitter that the video's premiere should be viewed in its explicit form, stating "Can't premiere on a network b/c its important that my art is not tampered with, or compromised prior to you viewing it for the 1st time." Minaj's longtime partner and hype man Safaree Samuels, also known as S.B., appears in the video, wearing a shirt promoting Minaj's second album Pink Friday: Roman Reloaded with its original release date February 14, 2012.

Minaj, closed in a cage, dressed in leopard style in the music video, after transforming

The video begins with a close-up of Minaj's mouth syncing the words of the song as the background and color of her lips change to the song beat. Scenes of dancers jump roping with Minaj and Hype Williams's names are rapidly intercut with the scene. Minaj is then shown pulling her leg over the back of her head, while wearing extreme blue eye make-up, clearly mimicking the cover to the 1985 Grace Jones album Island Life. Minaj is then shown sitting in a hot pink Lamborghini Aventador, noticeably avoiding eye-contact with the camera. As the song chorus begins, rapid intercutting continues, featuring Minaj angrily growling at the camera and a plastic doll with a more than voluptuous figure. Adorned in pink attire, Minaj continues to angrily rap the song's lyrics in pink wigs including a curly banged style, and a tight ponytail. As the second verse starts, a leopard is shown in a cage, which later transforms into Minaj, also in the cage, which draws resemblance with Shakira's "She Wolf". As Minaj continuously transforms back and forth between a large predator cat and back into herself she strikes advanced yoga poses. As the video ends, Minaj is seen adorned in childlike clothing while standing on an oversized pink chair, as a reference to Jessie J in "Price Tag". As the camera pans closer to Minaj, her eyes begin to grow in an animated way, referencing Lady Gaga in "Bad Romance". As the video ends, the clip shows a "Super Bowl 2012" ad with color splashing in the background, referring to the album cover for Pink Friday: Roman Reloaded, and closes with Minaj lying in the cage calmly after finishing an eccentric dance. The whole video has scenes flashing rapidly in and out of view.

=== Reception ===
Upon its release, the video set a record by accumulating 4.8 million views during its first 24 hours of being uploaded to Vevo. The record was broken by Rihanna's "Where Have You Been", which garnered 4.9 million, and later by Justin Bieber's "Boyfriend" which amassed more than 8 million views in 24 hours.

The music video received positive critical reviews. A writer of Complex said that the video was Nicki "colorfully animated" and "explicitly wild". Rap-Up favored Minaj's wild and wacky looks in the explicit clip. Andrew Martin of Prefix Magazine described the video as "over the top", positively stating that the video is nothing short of entertaining." Jokingly commenting that the video resembles Grace Jones getting lost in one of Katy Perry's wonkafied adventures, Christopher R. Weingarten of Spin showed disdain for Hype Williams' "epilepsy-inducing strobes". The Boombox stated that Minaj has outdone herself with the visuals for her Diamond Kuts-produced track, later describing it as the "perfect match for Minaj's manic stage persona". Consequence of Sound described the video as "schizophrenic as the lady rapper herself", adding that "in just under four minutes, Minaj presents a visual tour de bizarreness, a feast for the eyes of the most insane things floating around in her brain, all wrapped in a nice Dayglo sheen." The Huffington Post described the video as eccentric as well as pointless and mind-numbing, yet favored Minaj's booty-dancing, writhing in a cage and wearing all sorts of different makeup. Billboard commented on Minaj's use of animals, stating that none are "wilder than the rapper herself." Sam Lansky from MTV gave the video a negative review, stating that Minaj "does no favors in honoring your recent predecessors while striking uncanny resemblances to Shakira's 'She Wolf', Lady Gaga's 'Bad Romance' and Jessie J's 'Price Tag'." Describing Minaj's ass-clapping and pelvic thrusting as "joyless", he adds "you've perfected the art of the goofy, theatrics in your videos, but there ain't no whimsy in 'Stupid Hoe'. In fact, it feels decidedly un-fun for a pastel-hued video with lots of OOC costumes, set to a track that features one of the nastiest beats ever".

BET refused to air the video, but the network never explained why. Gerrick D. Kennedy of the Los Angeles Times theorized the network may have refused to air the video because of its language or its images of a naked doll.

== Charts ==
Chart (2012)	Peak position
Canada Hot 100 (Billboard)	87
UK Singles (Official Charts)	63
UK Hip Hop/R&B (Official Charts)	19
US Billboard Hot 100	59
US Hot R&B/Hip-Hop Songs (Billboard)	53

== Certifications ==
Certifications for "Stupid Hoe"
Region	Certification	Certified units/sales
Australia (ARIA)	Gold	35,000^{‡}
United States (RIAA)	Platinum	1,000,000^{‡}
^{‡} Sales+streaming figures based on certification alone.

== Release history ==
Release dates and formats for "Stupid Hoe"
Region	Date	Format	Label	Ref.
Various	December 20, 2011	Digital download	Cash Money	
