= Roman in Moscow =

"Roman In Moscow"
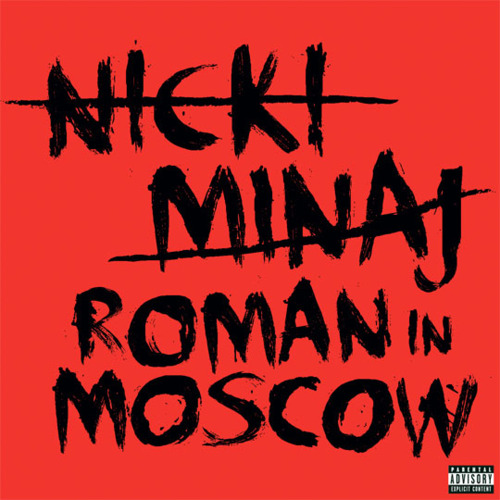

Promotional single by Nicki Minaj
- Released: December 2, 2011
- Recorded: 2011
- Length: 2:38
- Label: Young Money; Cash Money; Universal Republic
- Songwriters: Onika Maraj, Nicholas Warwar, Raymond Diaz, Mike Aiello
- Producers: Streetrunner; Diaz

Nicki Minaj promotional singles chronology
"Till the World Ends (the Femme Fatale remix)" (2011)	"Roman In Moscow" (2011)	"Stupid Hoe" (2011)

"Roman in Moscow" is a song by rapper Nicki Minaj. It was released on December 2, 2011, as a teaser for her second album, Pink Friday: Roman Reloaded, although it was not included on the track list. The song was written by Minaj and producers Streetrunner and Raymond "Sarom" Diaz.

The song peaked on the Billboard Hot 100 at number 64 and the Billboard R&B/Hip-Hop Digital Songs chart at number 13 in December 2011.

== Background ==
"Roman in Moscow" was written by Minaj and producers Streetrunner (Nicholas Warwar) and Raymond "Sarom" Diaz, and Mike Aiello. In December 2011, Minaj said the song was a teaser and the "wackest thing" from the album. She hinted that a video of the song's backstory would be filmed. The song was not included on the final track listing. When asked by a fan on Twitter, Minaj replied that she didn't like the song much.

== Live performances ==
Minaj performed "Roman in Moscow" along with "Turn Me On" and "Super Bass" for 2012 New Years on Dick Clark's New Year's Rockin' Eve with Ryan Seacrest. She performed it on selected dates of her Pink Friday Tour and Pink Friday: Reloaded Tour.

== Charts ==
Chart (2011)	Peak position
US Billboard Hot 100	64
