= Roman's Revenge =

2010 song by Nicki Minaj

Promotional single by Nicki Minaj featuring Eminem

from the album Pink Friday
- Released: October 30, 2010
- Recorded: 2010
- Studio: Effigy Studios (Detroit, MI); Glenwood Place Studios (Burbank, CA)
- Genre: Hip-hop
- Length: 4:38
- Label: Young Money; Cash Money; Universal Motown
- Songwriters: Onika Maraj; Marshall Mathers; Kasseem Dean
- Producer: Swizz Beatz

Audio video
- "Roman's Revenge" on YouTube

"Roman's Revenge" is a song by rapper Nicki Minaj featuring Eminem, from Minaj's debut studio album Pink Friday (2010). Minaj and Eminem perform as their respective alter egos Roman Zolanski and Slim Shady. Written by Minaj, Eminem, and producer Swizz Beatz, it was released on October 30, 2010, exclusively through the U.S. iTunes Store, as a promotional song preceding the album's release. The song is considered a response to rapper Lil' Kim after her comments towards Minaj as a rising artist. An official remix featuring Lil Wayne was released to the U.S. iTunes Store on January 19, 2011.

== Background ==
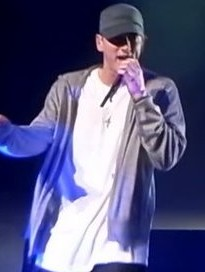
Eminem is featured on the song as his alter-ego Slim-Shady; created during his 1997 effort Slim Shady EP.

Minaj has had a feud with rapper Lil' Kim since her success with Pink Friday. Kim accused Minaj of copying her image, saying: "If you are going to steal my swag, you gonna have to pay. Something gotta give. You help me, I help you". This song was believed to be a response to Kim's comments, though at the time it was unconfirmed. Minaj responded to the situation in an interview saying, "She picked a fight with Foxy, then she picked a fight with Eve, then she picked a fight with Remy, then it was Mrs. Wallace, then it was Nicki Minaj. Every time you in the news, it's 'cause you gettin' at somebody! Where's your music?"

Lil' Kim reignited the feud with the release of her mixtape Black Friday (a reference to Minaj's Pink Friday). Following the release of Pink Friday: Roman Reloaded, critics suggested that the track "Stupid Hoe" may have contained attacks directed at Kim. Lil' Kim later suggested in an interview with 105's Breakfast Club that the song "Automatic" was similar to her unreleased material, also calling Minaj "obnoxious" and "catty". Minaj seemingly alluded to the feud in a 2018 Genius interview, saying: "Someone got at me. A veteran got at me, and I hit them with Roman's Revenge and then I kept on going." However, in 2021, Lil' Kim stated on the red carpet of the BET Awards that she would like to do a Verzuz with Minaj.

"Roman's Revenge" features both Nicki Minaj and Eminem rapping as their alter-egos. Minaj raps as Roman Zolanski whilst Eminem raps as his well-known alter-ego, Slim Shady. The song also marks the debut of Minaj's additional alter-ego, Martha Zolanski, who can be heard in the end of the song screaming in a British accent as Roman's mother. Minaj revealed his feature on the track two days before it released, on October 28, 2010, in an interview with MTV News. Minaj told MTV News that she was thinking of collaborating with Eminem for a while and in the end simply asked him:

We went out on a whim and put it in the air like, It'd be great if he would collaborate with us. I remember I kept talking about it, and I thought, It can't hurt. I sent him one record, and he didn't love it. He didn't say, I don't love it; he just said, Can you send me something that's a little more me? I sent him an e-mail and thanked him for that, just having enough respect. Sometimes people don't respond. He had the respect, at least, to treat me like a peer.

== Composition ==
"Roman's Revenge" features both rappers exchanging bars over a "spastic beat" produced by Swizz Beatz. It is introduced with a series of digital effects and ominous strings, which Matthew Wilkening of AOL Radio compared to "some old video game". After the introduction, the song quickly starts with "a hiccuping series of computerized samples pushed forward by sporadic, tinny electronic drums" and only rests during "occasional baths of warm keyboards brightening." The beat of the song lays an intense dark energy with weighty knock of the drums and bass line. The "clattering" instrumental creates an angry tone for the most aggressive run of tracks. The production for the track is mainly surrounded by pulsating strings that allows for both rappers to exchange verse's in violent ways, and adds to the drama of the song.

Lyrically, "Roman's Revenge" has been described as "unrelenting", "bonkers", "angry" and "outrageous". Critics found Minaj's lyrics as intense and incisive, but Eminem's rap has been noted as being similar to his earlier work and contains misogyny and homophobia. Many critics questioned Minaj's alter ego, Roman Zolanski, as being an "angry gay male" because it was expected that the rappers would go toe-to-toe in between verses. The song makes references to Disney's Princess Jasmine and Aladdin, iPods, and New York Giant Eli Manning as well as the song "Scenario" by A Tribe Called Quest, the latter of which is referenced through the line "Rawr, rawr like a dungeon dragon" which is taken from Busta Rhymes' verse in "Scenario."

== Reception ==
=== Critics ===
David Jeffries of AllMusic called the song the key track of the album, referring to Minaj as a savage as she "roars like a tiger" while standing up to Eminem. Brad Wete of Entertainment Weekly called the song "merciless", as Nicki/Roman tears into the song with lyrics firing at whoever they are meant to be fired at. Alexis Petridis of The Guardian praised the song's eerie and vulgar tone, referring to Minaj's tone of voice as "thrilling, quivering & edge-of-panic." Margaret Wappler of Los Angeles Times complemented Minaj's "huffing and puffing" at Eminem's alter-ego, while both characters exchange violent lyrics. Praising the song as the main track of the album, Scott Plagenhoef of Pitchfork Media complimented the song as aggressive and pointed out Eminem's use of "recycling his Shady-circa-99 persona." Jesse Cataldo of Slant dissected the track while attempting to understand Roman Zolanski as a "less carefully identified sliver of herself than the embodiment of what makes her appealing." Cataldo additionally added that the song gets "violently up in your face."

However, other critics dismissed and negatively reviewed the anti-gay slurs rapped by guest-feature Eminem. Marc Hogan of Spin praised the song for noting Minaj's capabilities to "compete with the big boys" in rap. He noted that Eminem and Minaj trade verses over "pulsating Swizz Beatz strings". Although Eminem makes a "killer blow" with an anti-gay slur on gay-friendly Minaj's track", Minaj retaliates with "outlandish British accent." Zach Baron and Rich Juzwiak of The Village Voice both debated on the track, praising it as well as dismissing the anti-gay lyrics by Eminem. Zach Baron praised Minaj for upstaging Eminem by stating that the guest-feature deserved to be shown up by Minaj as she additionally adds more character into the song with additional voice-changes. Rich Juzwiak approached the song as the gay-male-alter-ego Roman Zolanski versus the anti-gay Slim Shady, and praised Minaj/Zolanski for "winning the battle." Juzwiak later questioned Minaj's alter-ego Roman as an "angry gay-male," stating that Roman's character should have gone ahead with knocking Eminem for his past "anti-gay-epithet," and his 'piss-on-women misogyny."

=== Lil' Kim diss ===
Many critics considered the song a "diss" towards Lil' Kim, who has been in disputes with Minaj since the beginning of her career. Mariel Concepcion of Billboard dissected the song stating "Nicki Minaj's highly-talked about "Roman's Revenge" track hit the net over the weekend, and the Harajuku Barbie appears to be taking jabs at Lil' Kim." In the first verse Minaj takes shots saying "Look at my show footage how these girls be spazzing/So fuck I look like getting back to a has-been/Yeah I said it has-been/hang it up/flatscreen" then again "You out of work/I know it's tough/but enough is enough/" Minaj then specifically takes jabs at Baltimore rapper Keys and Lil'Kim in the second verse rapping, "Is this the thanks that I get for putting you bitches on/ is it my fault that all of you bitches gone/" and following this line this inferred she was talking about Lil' Kim "Nicki she just mad cause you took the spot/ word that bitch mad cause I took the spot/ Well bitch if you aint shitting then get off the pot/Got some niggas out in Brooklyn that'll off ya top/. Minaj also subliminally took jabs at rapper Keys with "I see them dusty ass Filas, Levi's/ Raggedy Ann's/ Holes in your knee highs". Lil' Kim fired back at the song at a club-concert, stating, "I will erase this bitch's social security number. First of all, I don't even need a record right now and I'd kill that bitch with my old shit. My records ain't just enter the charts, they made history. What the fuck is this bullshit, this shit come and go!" Minaj later stated in an interview on The Wendy Williams Show that, "They know what I'm talking about. See that's the thing when you put out records; you know only the 'guilty ones' feel like you're talking about them. So you know, if you have nothing to worry about, if you haven't came out saying stuff, if you never came out saying your ungrateful bullshit then you wouldn't worry about it."

In response to "Roman's Revenge", Lil' Kim released "Black Friday" which debuted on DJ Absolut's Hot 97 show on Thanksgiving Day. It was universally panned by music critics.

== Live performances ==
Minaj performed the song live during VH1's Divas Support the Troops for the men and women of the military. The song was accompanied by other singles from the rapper's debut album and "Girls Just Wanna Have Fun" with Katy Perry. After winning the MTV Video Music Award for Best Hip-Hop Video at the 2011 MTV Video Music Awards, she said that "The new album is going to have a lot of Roman on it ... And if you're not familiar with Roman, then you will be familiar with him very soon. He's the boy that lives inside of me. He's a lunatic and he's gay and he'll be on there a lot." Minaj performed a snippet of the song during her performance at the 54th Grammy Awards. She has performed the song on select dates of her Pink Friday Tour. She has also added the song to her Pink Friday: Reloaded Tour setlist. Minaj later went on to perform the song during her medley performance for the Michael Jackson Video Vanguard Award at the 2022 MTV Video Music Awards.

== Media appearance ==
The song was prominently featured as a diegetic part of the soundtrack to Judd Apatow's This Is 40 (2012) where it is explicitly presented as a young, current, female, pop favorite of the protagonist's wife and daughter, which contrasts with the old, classic, male, rock music he favors.

== Credits and personnel ==
Credits are taken from Pink Friday liner notes.

- Vocals: Nicki Minaj, Eminem (rap)
- Writing: O. Maraj, Safaree "SB" Samuels, Eminem
- Recording: Ariel Chobaz
  - Assisted by: Lyttleton "Cartwheel" Carter
- Mix engineer: Ariel Chobaz
  - Assisted by: Lyttleton "Cartwheel" Carter
- Additional vocals: Safaree "SB" Samuels
- Producing: Swizz Beatz

== Charts ==
Chart (2010)	Peak position
UK R&B Chart	29
UK Singles Chart	125
US Billboard Hot 100	56
US Hot Rap Songs	23
US Hot R&B/Hip-Hop Songs	85

== Certifications ==
Certifications for "Roman's Revenge"
Region	Certification	Certified units/sales
Australia (ARIA)	Gold	35,000^{‡}
^{‡} Sales+streaming figures based on certification alone.

== Lil Wayne remix ==
"Roman's Revenge 2.0"

Promotional single by Nicki Minaj featuring Lil Wayne

from the album Pink Friday (Deluxe)
- Released: January 19, 2011
- Recorded: 2010
- Length: 3:49
- Label: Young Money; Cash Money; Universal Motown
- Songwriters: Kaseem Dean; Dwayne Carter; T. Smith; Onika Maraj
- Producer: Swizz Beatz

A remix to the original song of the same name was created by many rappers, most of which replaced original guest Eminem and kept Minaj's original verses. Rapper Busta Rhymes created a remix for the song, in which he takes credit for his sampled line "Rah, rah, like a dungeon dragon." Rap-Up later confirmed that Lil Wayne will be featured in the official remix of the song. The remix, named "Roman's Revenge 2.0" was officially released to the iTunes Store in the United States on January 19, 2011, and later released as a bonus track on certain European versions of the iTunes Store deluxe edition of Pink Friday, before ultimately appearing on the complete edition re-issue of Pink Friday for its 10 Year anniversary. Many critics complimented the song's remix, while others favored the original with Eminem.

=== Critical reception ===
During the song's release, Rap-Up described Wayne's verse as "hungry." Chris Ryan of MTV Buzzworthy gave the song a positive review calling the song thrilling to listen to, and appreciating Wayne's addition stating that his earlier prison sentencing did not affect Wayne's "lyrical acumen or his culinary tastes." Ryan additionally appreciated the collaboration between both label-mates. Jayson Rodriguez of MTV stated that after Wayne's jail-sentencing, he "made up" for his absence by assisting Minaj on a remix of one of her best cuts off Pink Friday.

Reviewing Wayne's lyrical content of the remix, Latifah Muhammad of The Boombox stated that Wayne delves "in between one explicit metaphor after another" as he quickly reclaims his position at the top of the "rap game." Tom Breihan of Pitchfork Media enjoyed Wayne's addition and complimented the remix as "a definite upgrade in every way." Breihan continued to compliment Wayne as a perfect gentleman in comparison to the original with Eminem, and stated that Wayne "sounds unbelievably happy to be on a track again," as every other rapper should feel nervous with Wayne back.

=== Release history ===
Country	Date	Format	Label
United States	January 19, 2011	Digital download	Young Money, Cash Money, Universal Motown
