= Beez in the Trap =

Single by Nicki Minaj featuring 2 Chainz

from the album Pink Friday: Roman Reloaded
- Released: May 29, 2012
- Recorded: 2011
- Studio: Conway, Hollywood, California
- Genre: Electro-hop; hardcore hip hop; southern hip hop
- Length: 4:28
- Label: Young Money; Cash Money; Universal Republic
- Songwriters: Onika Maraj; Maurice Jordan; Tauheed Epps
- Producer: Kenoe

Nicki Minaj singles chronology
"Take It to the Head" (2012)	"Beez in the Trap" (2012)	"Get Low" (2012)

2 Chainz singles chronology
"Breakfast (Syrup)" (2012)	"Beez in the Trap" (2012)	"My Moment" (2012)

"Beez in the Trap" is a song by rapper Nicki Minaj, featuring American rapper 2 Chainz, from her second studio album, Pink Friday: Roman Reloaded (2012). It was released on May 29, 2012, by Young Money, Cash Money, and Universal Republic as the album's third single. It was written by both artists, alongside producer Kenoe.

Musically, "Beez in the Trap" is primarily electro-hop and hardcore hip hop with minimalist production and elements of trap music. The song peaked at No. 48 on the Billboard Hot 100 and No. 7 on the hot rap charts. It is certified Triple Platinum in the United States, Gold in Australia, Brazil, and New Zealand, and Silver in the United Kingdom. in An accompanying music video for the track was released on Vevo on April 6, 2012.

== Background ==
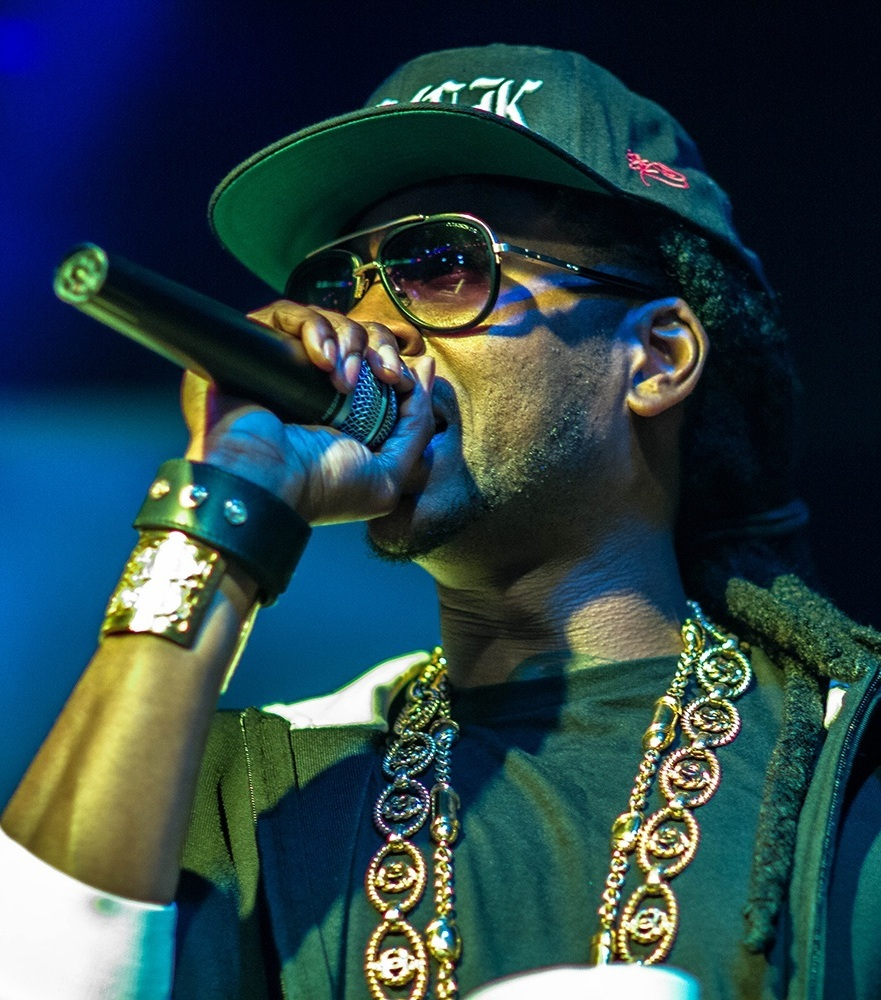
Minaj recruited rapper 2 Chainz for "Beez in the Trap".

"Beez in the Trap" was written by Minaj, Maurice Jordan, and 2 Chainz, while production was handled by Kenoe. It was recorded at Conway Studios in Los Angeles, California by Ariel Chabaz and Finis "KY" White with assistance from Jon Sher. Mixing of the song was done by Chabaz with additional help from Sher at Conway Studios. Originally, Kenoe began sending both pop and hip-hop songs to Minaj when he heard that production of her second album had begun. Later that same day, Minaj's A&R Mack Maine informed him that she was looking for "some rap shit", so he submitted more aggressive, urban songs in hopes of inclusion on the record. Kenoe said that the song's musical concept was simplicity as he didn't want "a million and one things going on in it", and credited it as being distinctive from the others included on the album. The song premiered on DJ Flex's radio show at Hot 97 on March 20, 2012. In an interview with Graham Norton, Minaj stated "It just means, 'I am always...' you know, that's our slang way of saying, 'I beez doing such-and-such-and-such.' So it's really like, 'I am always in the trap.' Now, the trap, ladies and gentlemen, relates to anywhere where you get your money."

== Composition ==
"Beez in the Trap" is a hypnotic electro-hop, hardcore hip-hop, southern hip hop and trap slow jam set in common time. The music is built around a spacious and echoed beat, consisting of sparse, hollow, "bubble-pop" drums with finger-snaps, a "growling" sub-bass, ricocheting sonar blips, and synthesized drips. According to Brandon Soderberg of Spin, the track echoes the minimalism of 1980s gangsta rap. It's devoid of a hook, with production described as "all empty space" while "sounding wholly alien". While still girlish and cheeky, Minaj's delivery deviates from the schizophrenic rhyme style of her Roman character present on the rest of Roman Reloaded for a more mellow, talkative style.

== Critical reception ==
The song received generally positive reviews. Although he felt that the song "lack[ed] real substance", Adam Fleischer of XXL praised "Beez in the Trap", calling it a "memorable moment" of Pink Friday: Roman Reloaded; he also complimented the "unique energy and distinct personality" Minaj displayed in the song. Ryan Dombal of Pitchfork Media described "Beez in the Trap" as an "effortless, pinging schoolyard taunt", and, in a separate review of the song for the same publication, Carrie Battan complimented Minaj's "daunting swagger", writing that she "hits a spot sweet enough to render every single gripe obsolete for four and a half minutes". In her review of Pink Friday: Roman Reloaded for The A.V. Club, Genevieve Koski described Minaj's performance as "relatively sedate but incredibly sharp": she called the song's production "spare" and "sonar-blip", and noted Minaj to be "at her most verbose" during the first six songs of the album.

Tom Ewing, writing for The Guardian, felt "Beez in the Trap" showed Minaj's awareness of her "divided fanbase": he noted that while Pink Friday: Roman Reloaded contained songs that were "precision-tooled for the modern pop environment", "Beez in the Trap" places more emphasis on Minaj's rapping ability, writing that the song "throw[s] a bone to the listeners who just want to hear her rap". Rob Markman of MTV News commended the performance of 2 Chainz, calling his verse in the song "charismatic", and went on to write that he "doesn't compromise a thing spitting alongside the multiplatinum rapper". No Ripcord stated that "I Am Your Leader and Beez in the Trap are thrilling and make good use of cameos". Slant Magazine stated that "I Am Your Leader and Beez in the Trap [are] two excellent tracks which manage to sound both bubbly and heavy as Minaj delivers her most effortlessly entertaining shit-talk to date".

Complex named the song No. 9 on their list of the best 50 songs of 2012, while Pitchfork Media ranked it No. 18. Rolling Stone ranked it as the 44th best song of the 2010s decade, while Pitchfork named it the 150th best song of the decade.

== Music video ==
Minaj filmed the official music video for "Beez in the Trap" on March 18, 2012, in Miami. It was directed by Benny Boom. The video, which featured 2 Chainz, was premiered on April 6, 2012, on Minaj's official VEVO account. The video was nominated for Best Hip-Hop Video at the 2012 MTV Video Music Awards. As of August 2021, the video has more than 206 million views.

=== Synopsis ===
The video begins with Minaj squatting down wearing a blonde wig in a pink turtleneck leotard, with barbed wire as a foreground. A clip is shown of women and men partying in a strip club. Minaj is then sitting in a green wig in a club with many strippers and exotic dancers; she and her female friends sit down in bikinis flashing money, and act flirtatiously with one another. Then 2 Chainz appears rapping his verse, while Minaj is seen beside him dancing very seductively in a leopard print catsuit in a dimly lit room. Throughout the video clips of Minaj and others are seen partying, and drinking. Birdman makes an appearance in the video. Towards the end, Minaj raps her second verse in a bikini with her hype man "SB" behind her, and she is in the same dark lit room with strippers sensually dancing around her. The video ends with Minaj and 2 Chainz back to back.

== Live performances ==
Minaj performed the song live for the first time on 106 & Park on April 3, 2012, along with "Champion", "Roman Reloaded", "Right by My Side", "HOV Lane", "I Am Your Leader", and "Fire Burns". She performed the song after "Champion" at the BET Awards 2012 along with 2 Chainz. The song was also performed live on Radio 1's Hackney Weekend on June 23, 2012. Minaj added the song to the set list of her Pink Friday Tour, where she performed the song with 2 Chainz on the North American leg. The song was also included on Minaj's Pink Friday: Reloaded Tour.

== Chart performance ==
The song debuted at number 73 on the Hot Digital Singles chart in the week ending August 15, 2012. As of December 2014 the song had sold over 1 million copies in the United States. On September 19, 2023, it was certified three-times Platinum by the Recording Industry Association of America.

== Credits and personnel ==
The credits for "Beez in the Trap" are adapted from the liner notes of Pink Friday: Roman Reloaded. Recording

- Recorded at Conway Studios in Los Angeles, California.

Personnel

- Nicki Minaj – songwriting, vocals
- 2 Chainz – songwriting, vocals
- Kenoe – production, songwriting
- Ariel Chobaz – recording, mixing
- Finis White – recording
- Jon Sher – recording and mixing assistant
- Brian "Big Bass" Gardner – mastering

== Charts ==
=== Weekly charts ===
Chart performance
Chart (2012)	Peak position
Ireland (IRMA)	74
UK Singles (Official Charts)	131
UK Hip Hop/R&B (Official Charts)	32
US Billboard Hot 100	48
US Hot R&B/Hip-Hop Songs (Billboard)	7
US Rhythmic Airplay (Billboard)	16

=== Year-end charts ===
Year-end chart performance
Chart (2012)	Position
US Hot R&B/Hip-Hop Songs (Billboard)	45

== Certifications ==
Region	Certification	Certified units/sales
Australia (ARIA)	Gold	35,000^{‡}
Brazil (Pro-Música Brasil)	Gold	30,000^{‡}
New Zealand (RMNZ)	Gold	15,000^{‡}
United Kingdom (BPI)	Silver	200,000^{‡}
United States (RIAA)	3× Platinum	3,000,000^{‡}
^{‡} Sales+streaming figures based on certification alone.

== Release history ==
Region	Date	Format	Label	Ref.
United States	May 29, 2012	Rhythmic contemporary radio	Young Money; Cash Money; Universal Republic	
