= I Get Crazy =

2009 song by Nicki Minaj featuring Lil Wayne

Song by Nicki Minaj

from the album Beam Me Up Scotty
- Released: April 18, 2009
- Recorded: 2009
- Genre: Hip hop
- Length: 3:40
- Label: Young Money
- Songwriters: Onika Maraj; Dwayne Carter; Rondell Turner
- Producer: Ron Browz

Nicki Minaj singles chronology
"I Get Crazy" (2009)	"BedRock" (2009)

"I Get Crazy" is a song by rapper Nicki Minaj, featuring Young Money Entertainment founder Lil Wayne, Young Money being the record label Nicki was on at the time. The song was included on Minaj's third mixtape Beam Me Up Scotty (2009), finding minor success on the US Rap chart and R&B/Hip-Hop chart, despite not being released as a single for the project.

== Background and release ==
"I Get Crazy" was included on Minaj's mixtape Beam Me Up Scotty (2009). The song was later release as a "street single" prior to the mixtape's official release after charting on the US Hot R&B/Hip-Hop Songs charts due to heavy airplay. In an interview with MTV News, Minaj described the song as a "real dope song". She revealed that after recording the track, she played it back for Lil Wayne who ended up adding his own verse into the song, causing Minaj to add an additional verse in the song. During Wayne's recording, he self-recorded his guitar back-beat, adding to the genre of the song. Discussing the songs merge of genres, Minaj stated:

That's kinda taboo in hip-hop to switch up your verses after [they are laid down], but he kinda bodied me and he stepped the energy up on it — so I stepped my energy up on it. The new version of 'I Get Crazy' is like a rock feel, 'cause we're just all rocked out. Being a lunatic and not caring.

— Nicki Minaj,

Described as "bananas" by Felipe Delerme of The Fader, "I Get Crazy" features Minaj's distinct voice and powerful/aloof rap style, rapidly rapping with cocky lyrics. The song incorporates a sample that resembles a signature alarm from The Bomb Squad. When asked if the song would be performed on tour via-Twitter, Minaj revealed to fans that "I Get Crazy" ranks as her least favorite collaboration with Wayne.

The song was officially released on streaming platforms, along with the rest of the mixtape and 3 new songs, in May 2021.

== Reception ==
=== Critical reception ===
Felipe Delerme of FADER gave the song a positive review, stating that the combination of Minaj and Wayne would expectidely create a "literal, perfect and bananas interpretation of the phrase 'I get crazy'". Delerme continued praise of the track by jokingly stating "what if Lil Wayne and Nicki Minaj had a rap baby? It would be super cute and by the age of 12 its voice would sound like Condoleezza Rice with a pack a day habit.

=== Chart performance ===
"I Get Crazy" peaked on the Hot Rap Songs chart at number twenty the week ending December 26, 2009, and peaked on the Hot R&B/Hip-Hop Songs chart at number thirty-seven the week, ending on the 23rd of January, 2010.

== Charts ==
Chart (2009)	Peak position
US Hot R&B/Hip-Hop Songs	37
US Hot Rap Songs	20
