= Dance (Ass) =

2011 single by Big Sean

Single by Big Sean featuring Nicki Minaj

from the album Finally Famous
- Released: September 20, 2011
- Recorded: 2011
- Genre: Hip hop
- Length: 3:17 (album version); 3:40 (remix)
- Label: GOOD Music; Def Jam
- Songwriter(s): Sean Anderson; Onika Maraj; Marcos Palacios; Ernest Clark; Marlyn Banks; Alonzo Miller; Rick James
- Producer(s): Da Internz

Big Sean singles chronology
"Lay It on Me" (2011)	"Dance (Ass)" (2011)	"Mercy" (2012)

Nicki Minaj singles chronology
"Make Me Proud" (2011)	"Dance (Ass)" (2011)	"Turn Me On" (2011)

Music video
- "Dance (A$$) Remix ft. Nicki Minaj" on YouTube

"Dance (Ass)", often stylized "Dance (A$$)", is a song by American rapper Big Sean, released as the third single from his debut studio album, Finally Famous (2011). It was added to urban radio formats on September 20, 2011 as the album's third official single. The official remix of the song features Nicki Minaj. It samples MC Hammer's "U Can't Touch This", which in turn samples Rick James's single "Super Freak".

== Critical reception ==
The Boston Globe said it is a "stale stripper anthem out of synch with what surrounds it. The production is heavy on vocal hooks, synths, and chattering beats, but the focus is Sean’s wit and insistent flow." The New York Times complimented the song's use of MC Hammer's "U Can't Touch This" and further went on to say that the song "basically cribs its chorus (uncredited) from the oeuvre of DJ Assault, the Detroit ghettotech innovator. Nowhere does Big Sean sound more confident or hilarious." The A.V. Club gave a positive review of the track and called it freewheeling, fast-footed, and full of swagger. The Village Voice complimented Sean's performance on the track and said "he took his microphone and turned it into an extension of his phallus, waving it down there like a gleeful toddler as the track imbued new meaning to MC Hammer's signature phrase 'Hammer Time', released in 1990 to the artist Hammer Time."

Ology called it a positive minority in the album and complimented the "flow-flip" and "low bass tones" in the song. HipHopDX commented on the song and said that it "narrowly escapes formulaic territory by injecting enough personality, comedy and verbal gymnastics to ably complement Da Internz' pounding, dance-ready bassline." Complex did not favor the track and called it repetitive and minimalist compared to most of the other tracks on the album.

== Music video ==
The music video of the song's remix version premiered on Vevo on November 1, 2011.

== Charts ==
=== Weekly charts ===
Weekly chart performance for "Dance (Ass)"
Chart (2011–2012)	Peak position
Canada (Canadian Hot 100)	69
US Billboard Hot 100	10
US Hot R&B/Hip-Hop Songs (Billboard)	3
US Hot Rap Songs (Billboard)	2
US Dance/Mix Show Airplay (Billboard)	24
US Pop Airplay (Billboard)	27
US Rhythmic (Billboard)	4

=== Year-end charts ===
Year-end chart performance for "Dance (Ass)"
Chart (2012)	Position
US Billboard Hot 100	57
US Hot R&B/Hip-Hop Songs (Billboard)	20
US Hot Rap Songs (Billboard)	11
US Rhythmic (Billboard)	19

== Certifications ==
Certifications for "Dance (Ass)"
Region	Certification	Certified units/sales
New Zealand (RMNZ)	Gold	15,000^{‡}
United States (RIAA)	5× Platinum	5,000,000^{‡}
^{‡} Sales+streaming figures based on certification alone.

== Radio and release history ==
Release dates and formats for "Dance (Ass)"
Country	Date	Format	Label	Version
United States	September 20, 2011	Urban contemporary	G.O.O.D. Music, Def Jam	Album version
United States	October 18, 2011	Urban contemporary	G.O.O.D. Music, Def Jam	Remix version featuring Nicki Minaj
United States	October 24, 2011	Digital download	G.O.O.D. Music, Def Jam	Remix version featuring Nicki Minaj
United States	October 25, 2011	Rhythmic radio	G.O.O.D. Music, Def Jam	Album version
United States	January 10, 2012	Top 40/Mainstream radio	G.O.O.D. Music, Def Jam	Album version
