= I Am Your Leader =

Song by Nicki Minaj featuring Rick Ross and Cam'ron

from the album Pink Friday: Roman Reloaded
- Released: April 3, 2012
- Recorded: 2011
- Studio: Conway Recording Studios (Los Angeles, CA)
- Genre: Electro-hop; hardcore hip hop
- Length: 3:33
- Label: Young Money; Cash Money; Universal Republic
- Songwriters: Onika Maraj; Fernando Garibay; Chauncey Hollis; William Roberts; Cameron Giles
- Producers: Fernando Garibay & Hit-Boy

Music video
- "I Am Your Leader" on YouTube

"I Am Your Leader" is a song recorded by rapper Nicki Minaj for her second album Pink Friday: Roman Reloaded (2012). The song features additional rap vocals from hip hop artists Rick Ross and Cam'ron. Production of the song was handled by Fernando Garibay & Chauncey "Hit-Boy" Hollis, with writing coming from Minaj, Garibay, Hollis, Ross, and Cam'ron. Musically, "I Am Your Leader" is a midtempo hardcore hip hop and electro hop song that contains sparse beats, minimal instrumentation, repetitive, high-pitched, off-pitch synth hooks, and a booming, static bass. Lyrically, Minaj "dishes boast-heavy verses about how she’s better than all these other bitches", according to Adam Fleischer of XXL Magazine.

"I Am Your Leader" garnered praise from contemporary music critics, with the majority praising the song's production, Minaj's vocal delivery, and the appearances of Cam'ron and Ross. To promote the song, an accompanying music video for the song was released on August 24, 2012. It features Minaj inside a brightly colored playhouse dressed in eccentric clothing, while sequences show Minaj, Ross and Cam'ron in different rooms such as the bathroom, the staircase, and the dining room. Fellow rapper Tyga also makes a brief cameo appearance. Despite not being released as a single, "I Am Your Leader" peaked at number 71 on the US Hot R&B/Hip-Hop Songs chart. Minaj briefly performed a part of the song on The Today Show's summer concert series.

== Background ==
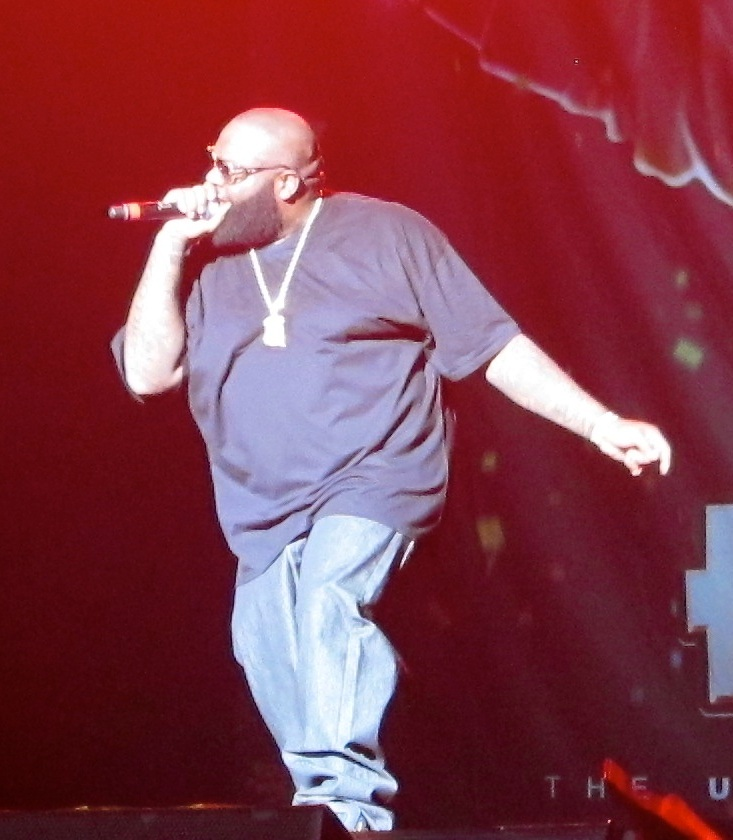
Rick Ross (pictured) and Minaj are long time collaborators.

Following the success of Minaj's debut album, Pink Friday, Cash Money co-CEO, Brian "Birdman" Williams announced to Billboard that Minaj was aiming to release her second album within the first quarter of 2012. In November 2011, Minaj announced on Twitter that the album would be released on February 14, 2012, though it was later delayed to April 3, 2012. The album focuses on Roman Zolanski, one of Minaj's alter egos that was first featured on Pink Friday. On May 24, 2012, a poll was posted on Minaj's official website asking fans to choose the next single(s). The poll was divided into three categories: The second category asked fans to choose between "Champion", "HOV Lane", and "I Am Your Leader". "Champion" had the most votes and won the poll; "HOV Lane" came in second, and "I Am Your Leader" came in third. On June 6, 2012, Minaj announced through her official Twitter that "Champion" would be the next urban single.

== Composition ==
"I Am Your Leader" is a hardcore hip-hop and electro-hop song that runs for three minutes and thirty-three seconds. The production consists of a "chilled-out, humming beat punctuated on the chorus with a blunted fake-horn hook—halfway between classic-era Neptunes and Look At Me Now" according to Andrew Unterberger of Popdust. It also contains repetitive, high-pitched, off-pitch synth hooks, and a booming, static bass. "I Am Your Leader" makes use of sparse beats, frills, minimal instrumentation, and allows Minaj's rhymes to be the focal point, all of which gives the song "something of a mixtape feel" according to Joe Rivers of No Ripcord. In his review of the song, Unterberger of Popdust noted Hit-Boy's modern hip hop production, saying "Diplo and Bangladesh might have to watch their back after the up-and-comers contributions to this album." Adam Fleischer of XXL said "Nicki dishes boast-heavy verses about how she’s better than all these other bitches."

== Critical reception ==
"I Am Your Leader" received positive reviews from critics. Andrew Unterberger of Popdust gave it a 4-star rating, complimenting Minaj's rapping as well as the guest verses of Cam'ron and Rick Ross. However, Unterberger felt that Minaj was overshadowed by the guest verses. Andrew Hampp of Billboard echoed Unterberger's sentiments, saying "The nostalgia of Cam's return trumps the overall catchiness of the song." XXL Magazine stated that "Though many of the early songs [on the album] lack real substance, the records remain generally exciting – “I Am Your Leader," alongside Rick Ross and Cam’ron, "Beez In The Trap" with 2 Chainz, and the triumphant "Champion" featuring Nas, Drake and Young Jeezy are all memorable moments". Joe Rivers No Ripcord praised "I Am Your Leader" along with "Beez in the Trap" for being "thrilling" and making "good use of cameos". Stephen Deusner of Paste Magazine said that "On the nursery rhyming "I Am Your Leader," [Minaj] spits yet another dick joke like a playground jeer, slyly undermining hip-hop's traditionally male-centric braggadocio. She's not only participating in phallocentric boasting; she's also inflating the convention with a Swedish penis pump until it's just shy of bursting".

David Jeffries of AllMusic listed it as one of the best tracks on the album. Matthew Cole of Slant Magazine stated that "'I Am Your Leader' and 'Beez in the Trap' [are] two excellent tracks which manage to sound both bubbly and heavy as Minaj delivers her most effortlessly entertaining shit-talk to date". Ryan Dombal of Pitchfork called "Come On A Cone" and "I Am Your Leader" "two brilliantly off-kilter songs". Tom Ewing of The Guardian said that "On "I Am Your Leader", [Minaj] drops a couple of octaves to gleefully pompous effect". Kevin Ritchie of NOW Magazine named it the top track of the album. Kyle Anderson of Entertainment Weekly named it one of the best tracks on the album along with "Champion".

== Promotion ==
=== Music video ===
The video begins with a pink mailbox with the song's title on the front written in different fonts. It is set in an esque brightly coloured playhouse. Minaj raps her first verse in a spacious room filled with antler heads and wacky windows and is seen standing on a zebra print carpet. Minaj is then seen in a bathtub, partially clothed, wearing only Alexander McQueen "Armadillo" jewel encrusted 12-inch stiletto shoes. She wears a green, Marilyn Monroe inspired wig. This is followed by a scene with all three rappers. After the hook, Rick Ross is seen sitting on a gold banquet table reciting his rap, shirtless, while gold mannequins ascend behind him. For Cam'ron's verse the scene is located on a staircase of moving photos of the three rappers. Nicki's Young Money labelmate, Tyga also makes a brief cameo appearance in the clip.

The video garnered positive reviews from critics, noting its high energy, fun and "wackiness". MTV's Rob Markman gave the video a positive review saying, "Only in a Nicki Minaj video can you find two of rap's hardest street figures performing in such a wacky setting, but it's the juxtaposition that 'I Am Your Leader' offers which makes it so fun."

=== Live performances ===
Minaj performed the song for the first time on The Today Show's summer concert series on August 14, 2012.

== Credits and personnel ==
Recording

- Recorded at: Conway Studios in Los Angeles, California.

Personnel

- Nicki Minaj – songwriting, vocals
- Rick Ross – songwriting, vocals
- Cam'ron – songwriting, vocals
- Fernando Garibay – production, songwriting
- Hitboy – production, songwriting
- Ariel Chabaz – recording, mixing
- John Rivers – recording, mastering
- Jon Sher – recording and mixing assistant

Credits adapted from Pink Friday: Roman Reloaded liner notes.

== Charts ==
Chart (2012)	Peak position
US Hot R&B/Hip-Hop Songs (Billboard)	71
