= The Fall-Off =

- Standard cover

Studio album by J. Cole
- Released: February 6, 2026
- Recorded: 2016 – c. 2026
- Genre: Hip-hop
- Length: 101:17
- Labels: Cole World; Dreamville; Interscope
- Producers: J. Cole; The Alchemist; AzizTheShake; Beat Butcha; Boi-1da; BoogzDaBeast; David Linaburg; DZL; Fierce; FnZ; Jūn Tetra & Gldy Jr; Luca Mauti; Maneesh; Omen; Powers Pleasant; Ron Gilmore Jr.; Steve Bilodeau; Sucuki; Tae Beast; T-Minus; Vinylz; Wu10

J. Cole chronology
Birthday Blizzard '26 (2026)	The Fall-Off (2026)

Alternative cover
- CD cover

Singles from The Fall-Off
- 1. "Who TF Iz U" Released: February 11, 2026; 2. "Legacy" Released: May 19, 2026

The Fall-Off is the seventh studio album by American rapper J. Cole. Released through Cole World, Dreamville Records, and Interscope Records on February 6, 2026, it was marketed as Cole's final album. It started development in 2016 and was first publicly teased in 2018. An unspecified event c. 2024, interpreted by various publications to be the Drake–Kendrick Lamar feud, inspired Cole to expand the concept, resulting in a double album. The Fall-Off tells the story of two visits to Cole's home city of Fayetteville, North Carolina, once at age twenty-nine and again at age thirty-nine.

Cole executively produced the album with Ibrahim Hamad, T-Minus, and his team at Dreamville. The album includes production credits from the Alchemist, Beat Butcha, Boi-1da, FnZ, Omen, T-Minus, and Vinylz, among others. It features guest appearances from Burna Boy, Erykah Badu, Future, Morray, Petey Pablo, PJ, and Tems. "Who TF Iz U" was released to rhythmic radio as the lead single on February 11, 2026. Legacy was released as the second radio single on May 19, 2026. "The Fall-Off Is Inevitable" was released as a promotional single via YouTube on January 14, with "Two Six" receiving a music video upon the album's release. In Cole's home country, the album earned an estimated 280,000 album-equivalent units in its first week, debuting at number one on the Billboard 200. Metacritic characterized the album's critical reception as "generally positive".

== Background ==
The concept of The Fall-Off stemmed from an unfruitful songwriting session in 2016. Struggling with writer's block, J. Cole determined that his music's shift in focus from the competitive and technical aspects of rapping to storytelling and emotive language had left him unmotivated. The album was conceived as a chance to be "the best rapper [he] could possibly be" and "rap, rap" again. The 2016 singles "Everybody Dies" and "False Prophets" were originally intended to appear on the album. The album was first publicly teased with "1985 (Intro to The Fall Off)", the final track of Cole's 2018 album KOD. Interpreted by some fans as a diss toward SoundCloud rappers, "1985" gives "valuable lessons about rap's generational gap, growth, and race" to young rappers, warning them of the consequences of navigating their fame and wealth unwisely. He formally confirmed The Fall-Off as an album during a Twitter questions-and-answers session on April 26, 2018. The 2019 single "Middle Child", which ended up on Dreamville compilation album Revenge of the Dreamers III, and the 2020 tracks "The Climb Back" and "Lion King on Ice", which made up the extended play Lewis Street, were intended to appear on The Fall-Off.

On December 29, 2020, Cole made a social media post depicting "the Fall-Off era", showcasing the planned timeline of releases leading up to the album itself: features, Revenge of the Dreamers III, The Off-Season, It's a Boy, and The Fall-Off; in the image's caption, he said that these were his goals before he could "scram". Cole further referenced the album, and the idea of it being his final, in song lyrics over the next few years. On the 2023 track "Adonis Interlude (The Montage)", he rapped: "Just cop The Fall-Off and he'll explain, is it the end of the chapter, happily ever after?" On "Crocodile Tearz" (2024), he rapped: "The Fall-Off is like Hov droppin' Reasonable Doubt last". Alongside the track listing announcement, Cole stated that The Fall-Off was "made with intentions to be [his] last". Days after the album's release, Cole answered an online fan's question about It's a Boy, stating that it would still be released eventually.

An early version of The Fall-Off was essentially finished, with "maybe a couple mixes left", prior to the release of Cole's 2024 mixtape Might Delete Later. Kendrick Lamar appeared on two tracks. The album expanded into a double album "after the events that still feed the algorithm to this day" two years prior to its release. Billboard's Michael Saponara, Complex's Jaelani Turner-Williams, and Vice's Caleb Catlin interpreted this as a reference to Cole's 2024 Lamar diss "7 Minute Drill", Cole's subsequent apology, and the following Drake–Lamar feud. The album's mission statement was laid out again in a message at the start of the first music video: "For the past ten years, this album has been hand-crafted with one intention: a personal challenge to myself to create my best work. To do on my last what I was unable to do on my first. I had no way of knowing how much time, focus, and energy it would eventually take to achieve this, but despite countless challenges along the way, I knew in my heart I would one day get to the finish line. I owed it first and foremost to myself, and secondly, I owed it to hip-hop."

== Marketing ==
On July 8, 2026, Cole announced a The Fall-Off Magazine, a limited-edition, single-issue, 144-page publication with artist interviews, reviews of hip-hop albums, journalistic articles about hip-hop history, and photography.

=== Title, artwork, and packaging ===
The title of The Fall-Off is intended as a "full circle" moment and reference to his debut mixtape The Come Up (2007).

The standard cover for the album is an old photograph taken by Cole when he was fifteen years old. It depicts his first makeshift home studio set-up. A chair stands in front of a small table with a sampler, various nondescript items, and some of his mother's compact disc (CD) collection atop. CD cases are also visible elsewhere in the room. The cover had been decided approximately seven years in advance. An alternative cover, used for the album's CD release, depicts Cole standing in front of a red and white wall; he looks at the ground with a somber expression, shadow covering half of his face, with his hands in the front pockets of his jacket. The alternative cover was chosen so that he could "look back in twenty years [and...] see an image of who [he] was at the time [he] released the project [he] worked on for so long." The back cover's photograph, also taken by Cole when he was fifteen, shows a variety of hip-hop-related posters on his bedroom wall. The album's track listing is rendered as a graphical overlay on the ceiling.

=== Album trailers ===
The album was announced with a teaser video on January 14, 2026. Cole goes about mundane activities, such as washing his car and eating at a restaurant, while an unnamed narrator reflects on fame, stating that "falling off" is an inevitable part of show business and that the general public doesn't give celebrities enough credit for achieving success in the first place, with the end of the teaser providing a snippet to the song “Poor Thang”. A second teaser video was released on the evening before the album's release; Cole sits at his makeshift studio while a speech about hard work and passion from mathematician Andrew Wiles plays with the end of this teaser providing a snippet to “I Love Her Again”.

=== Singles and music videos ===
The album's lead single is "Who TF Iz U", which was served to rhythmic radio in the United States on February 11, 2026, with forty-one commitments.

Although not released as singles, two tracks from the album were released as music videos. Under the title "Disc 2 Track 2", "The Fall-Off Is Inevitable" was released on January 14. Directed by Ryan Doubiago, it depicts an "Inception-like labyrinth of Cole's life in reverse". The end of the video featured a snippet to the song “Who TF Iz U”. The video received additional promotion through an interview clip with journalist Timmhotep Aku on January 20. The video for "Two Six", directed by Simon Chasalow, was released on February 6 and features a "grainy aesthetic".

=== Trunk Sale Tour 26 ===
Cole embarked on the Trunk Sale Tour 26, a cross-country road trip in which fans would have opportunities to meet him and buy CD copies of The Fall-Off out of the trunk of his old Honda Civic. According to the event's announcement on February 7, 2026, there was no rigid plan for where he would drive to, and no timeframe was mentioned. Throughout the trip, Cole interacted with fans through various activities, such as listening to the album while riding in the car with them, playing basketball with them, and serving them at a restaurant. The trip was documented through official tour vlogs in which potential music videos for "Legacy" and "Old Dog" were previewed.

=== The Fall-Off World Tour ===
The Fall-Off World Tour comprises seventy-three dates. It started in Charlotte, United States, on July 10, 2026, and will end in Johannesburg, South Africa, on December 12.

== Music, lyrics, and theme ==
About the concept, Cole said: "Disc 29 tells a story of me returning to my hometown at age twenty-nine. A decade after moving to New York, accomplishing what would have seemed impossible to most, I was at a crossroads with the three loves of my life: my woman, my craft, and my city. Disc 39 gives insight into my mindset during a similar trip home, this time as a thirty-nine-year-old man. Older and a little closer to peace."

== Reception ==
=== Commercial performance ===
The Fall-Off debuted at number one on the Billboard 200. According to estimates from Luminate reported by Billboard, the album earned 280,000 album-equivalent units in its first week in the United States, comprising 166.5 thousand streaming-equivalent albums from 169.5 million on-demand streams, 113 thousand pure album sales, and five hundred track-equivalent albums. This made for Cole's seventh number-one album on the chart, following The Off-Season (2021), KOD (2018), 4 Your Eyez Only (2016), 2014 Forest Hills Drive (2014), Born Sinner (2013), and Cole World: The Sideline Story (2011). The album also debuted at number two on the Top Album Sales and Top Streaming Albums charts. Approximately seventy-one per cent (eighty thousand) of the pure sales were from vinyl sales; The Fall-Off is the first Cole album to be available for purchase on vinyl concurrent with its release on digital platforms and streaming services. Hits calculated that the album earned 290,861 album-equivalent units in its first sales week in the United States, comprising 175,345 streaming-equivalent albums, 114,927 sales, and 588 track-equivalent albums. In its first day, fourteen of the album's tracks debuted on music streaming service Spotify's United States Top 50 chart, the highest placement being "Two Six" at number three. The album's first day on streaming service Apple Music earned Cole eight of the platform's top ten spots. Twenty-one of the album's twenty-four tracks charted on the Billboard Hot 100 in its debut week, the highest being "Two Six" at number sixteen.

In Australia, the album debuted at number seven on the national chart and number one on the chart for hip-hop albums. The Australian Recording Industry Association noted that it makes Cole's sixth album to reach the top ten, including mixtapes and label compilation albums.

In the United Kingdom, the album debuted at number three on the national chart and number six on the chart for hip-hop albums. The Official Charts Company noted that it makes Cole's fifth album to reach the top ten.

=== Critical reviews ===
Professional ratings
Aggregate scores
Source	Rating
Any Decent Music	6.6/10
Metacritic	67/100
Review scores
Source	Rating
The Arts Desk	4/5 stars
Clash	9/10
Consequence	B−
Exclaim!	7/10
The Guardian	3/5 stars
The Line of Best Fit	7/10
Pitchfork	5.3/10
Rolling Stone	3.5/5 stars
Slant	2.5/5 stars

According to the review aggregator Metacritic, The Fall-Off received "generally favorable reviews" based on a weighted average score of 67 out of 100 from nine critic scores. The review aggregator Any Decent Music gave the album a weighted average score of 6.6 out of 10 from nine critic scores.

The Arts Desk's Ibi Keita awarded the album four stars out of five, writing that "from the opening moments, the album feels like home" and that Cole "sounds reflective, grounded, and deeply familiar". Keita continued that "there's a calm confidence running through the record", concluding that "The Fall-Off feels like closure without finality, a reminder of why J. Cole's voice has mattered for so long, and why it still does now". Clash's Robin Murray awarded the album a score of nine out of ten, writing that it "depicts a soul in love with the art and culture of hip-hop" and that it "propels him and supports him, a place of solace, but also of banishment", stating that the album "feels like his masterpiece, a classic right off the bat". Murray continued that on the first disc, "there's a playful edge to the music" and that it sees "a longing for maturity, and a lingering self-doubt". On the second disc, Murray stated that it contrasts with the first and is "music made specifically for himself". Concluding his review, he wrote that the record "is living testimony to J. Cole's ability to stay the path", describing it as a "masterpiece". Consequence's Kiana Fitzgerald awarded the album a grade of B−, writing that "the strongest parts of the album are when Cole is rapping his ass off over dynamic beats", however, "Cole isn't reacting to the heat of the challenge anymore" and that "he's comfortable", potentially "complacent". Concluding her review, Fitzgerald wrote that "while disc one is all heart-driven bravado, disc two settles into Cole's interpretation of love".

Exclaim!'s Vernon Ayiku awarded the album a score of seven out of ten, writing that it is "a technical showcase filled with dense rhyme schemes, melodic versatility, expansive storytelling, and savvy production" and that it is "undoubtedly J. Cole's most complete body of work". However, Ayiku notes that despite the anticipation, "completeness is not the same as transcendence" and that the album "arrives burdened by expectation". The Guardian's AD Carson awarded the album three stars out of five, writing that the album "is full of technical proficiency, raw lyrical skill, citation, interpolation, and sampling", and that it "attempts nothing less than to embody a half-century of hip-hop". Nevertheless, Carson continued writing that the album "seems like an attempt to convey Cole's growth and development, but it's lacking in the emotional depth that comes from real human interactions" and that "he is stronger when examining hip-hop itself", comparing the record to Ralph Ellison's 1952 novel Invisible Man. Concluding his review, Carson stated that The Fall-Off "will stand not as his thesis, but his instruction manual to others: a masterful, deeply knowledgeable but rather brittle read". The Line of Best Fit's William Rosebury awarded the album a score of seven out of ten, writing that despite the hype and anticipation leading up to the record, it "doesn't arrive in the form many would have expected". Roseburry stated that the album is "a love letter to hip-hop music, with Cole incorporating interpolations and samples from classic records across the album", before concluding that the album "succeeds in presenting J. Cole in his final form, freed from the pop-chasing of his early career and the GOAT rapper status he always yearned for".

Pitchfork's Benny Sun awarded the album a score of 5.3 out of 10, writing that "quintessential to a J. Cole record, The Fall-Off offers some insane societal commentary that calls into question how many of his daily comings and goings involve actual people". He continued that "plenty of moments on The Fall-Off remind of the hunger of his early mixtapes, the purposeful thrills of his 2010s hits, or even the misguided zaniness of KOD, though none materialize in meaningful doses". Rolling Stone's Mosi Reeves awarded the album three-and-a-half stars out of five, praising the two-disc concept and stating that the "songs link together like chapters in a novel". He wrote that the record "can sometimes feel simpatico and obvious, with mellifluously soulful tones that conjure an air of anxious nostalgia" and that it's a "symptomatic of a persistent quality that haunts his work". He concluded his review stating that "what ultimately animates The Fall-Off is Jermaine Cole himself" as "he reveals himself as a witty, aggravating, and sometimes enraging presence". Slant's Paul Attard awarded the album two-and-a-half stars out of five and described the record as "a body of work so cautious, so mannerly, and so self-aware that it mistakes adulthood for depth and discipline for risk", continuing that Cole's "egotism reaches new heights on The Fall-Off, especially since so little here breaks new ground". Concluding his review, Attard wrote that "if visible flop-sweat were all that mattered in art, The Fall-Off might be as remarkable as it insists it is".

== Track listing ==
Disc 29 (first disc) track listing
No.	Title	Writer(s)	Producer(s)	Length
1.	"29 Intro"	Jermaine Cole; James Taylor^{[b]}	Cole	0:57
2.	"Two Six"	Cole; Tyler Williams; Damon Coleman; Ron Gilmore Jr.; Donald Pears II^{[c]}	T-Minus; Omen; Gilmore^{[a]}	3:16
3.	"Safety"	Cole; Kelvin Wooten; Powers Pleasant; Tim Friedrich; Michael Holmes; Thomas Wlodarczyk; Keir Gist^{[d]}; Melvin Dinkins^{[d]}; Joe Sample^{[d]}	Cole; Wu10; Pleasant; Sucuki; DZL	5:18
4.	"Run a Train" (with Future)	Cole; Nayvadius Cash; Steve Bilodeau; Williams; Nima Jahanbin; Aaron Goldstein; Mario Dragoi	T-Minus; Jūn Tetra & Gldy Jr; Mario Luciano^{[a]}	4:02
5.	"Poor Thang"	Cole; Bilodeau; Williams; Wooten; D. Coleman; Holmes; Torence Hatch^{[e]}; Marcus Roach^{[e]}; Jeremy Allen^{[e]}; Walter Sigler^{[e]}; Phillip Hurtt^{[e]}	Cole; T-Minus^{[a]}; Wu10^{[a]}; Omen^{[a]}; DZL^{[a]}	4:50
6.	"Legacy" (with PJ)	Cole; Paris Jones; Bilodeau; Luca Mauti; Brayon Nelson; Williams; Justin Bryant; Leroy Emmanuel^{[f]}	Cole; T-Minus; Hollywood JB^{[a]}	3:55
7.	"Bunce Road Blues" (with Future and Tems)	Cole; Cash; Temilade Openiyi; Abbas Hamad; Bryan Sledge; Margaux Whitney; Gilmore; Alan Maman; Usher Raymond^{[g]}; Brian Casey^{[g]}; Jermaine Mauldin^{[g]}; Manuel Seal^{[g]}	The Alchemist	5:10
8.	"Who TF Iz U"	Cole; Williams; Anderson Hernandez; Harvey Fuqua; John Bristol; Beatrice Verdi	Cole; T-Minus; Vinylz; FnZ; Bilodeau; Scotty Coleman	4:37
9.	"Drum n Bass"	Cole; Benjamin Siciliano; Jahanbin; Goldstein; Williams; Scott Cossu^{[h]}	Jūn Tetra & Gldy Jr; T-Minus^{[a]}	4:14
10.	"The Let Out"	Cole; Williams; Bilodeau	T-Minus; Bilodeau; Cole^{[a]}	4:14
11.	"Bombs in the Ville/Hit the Gas"	Cole; Bilodeau; Williams; Matthew Samuels; Christopher Bridges^{[i]}; Shondrae Crawford^{[i]}	Cole; T-Minus; Boi-1da; Fierce; Carter Lang^{[a]}; Westen Weiss^{[a]}	4:06
12.	"Lonely at the Top" (bonus track)	Cole; David Linaburg; Wooten; Holmes; Jeremie Pennick^{[j]}; Amber Croskery^{[j]}; Thomas Paladino^{[j]}	Wu10; DZL	3:24
Total length:				48:03

Disc 39 (second disc) track listing
No.	Title	Writer(s)	Producer(s)	Length
1.	"39 Intro"	Cole; Williams; Michael Mulé; Isaac De Boni; Hernandez; Wooten; Bilodeau; S. Coleman; William Hutchison^{[k]}	Cole; T-Minus; FnZ; Vinylz; Wu10; Bilodeau; S. Coleman^{[a]}	6:06
2.	"The Fall-Off Is Inevitable"	Cole; Holmes; Maneesh Bidaye; Wooten	DZL; Maneesh; Wu10^{[a]}; Ibrahim Hamad^{[a]}	2:56
3.	"The Villest" (with Erykah Badu)	Cole; Erica Wright; D. Coleman; Williams; Wooten; Holmes; Antwan Patton^{[l]}; André Benjamin^{[l]}; Barbara Gaskins^{[l]}	Cole; Omen; T-Minus^{[a]}; Wu10^{[a]}; DZL^{[a]}	4:30
4.	"Old Dog" (with Petey Pablo)	Cole; Moses Barrett; Williams; Clifford Harris^{[m]}; Aldrin Davis^{[m]}	Cole; T-Minus^{[a]}	3:22
5.	"Life Sentence"	Cole; Wooten; Williams; Cedric Brown; Craig David^{[n]}; Fraser Thorneycroft-Smith^{[n]}; Earl Simmons^{[n]}; Anthony Fields^{[n]}	T-Minus; Ced^{[a]}; I. Hamad^{[a]}	4:12
6.	"Only You" (with Burna Boy)	Cole; Damini Ogulu; Williams; Holmes; Mauti; Siccature Alcock; Daoud Anthony; Abdul Aziz Dieng; Alistaire McCalla^{[o]}; Roshaun Clarke^{[o]}; Xavier Davidson^{[o]}; Donovan Bennett^{[o]}; Nigel Staff^{[o]}; Wayne Morris^{[o]}; Eva Fontes^{[o]}	T-Minus; DZL; Mauti; Jah Cure^{[a]}; Anthony^{[a]}; AzizTheShake^{[a]}; I. Hamad^{[a]}	4:46
7.	"Man Up Above"	Cole; Williams; William Robinson^{[p]}; Marvin Sapp^{[p]}; Matthew Brownie^{[p]}; Jennifer Lopez^{[p]}; Jason Phillips^{[p]}; David Styles^{[p]}; Andre Deyo^{[p]}; Troy Oliver^{[p]}; Jean-Claude Olivier^{[p]}; Samuel Barnes^{[p]}; José Arbex^{[p]}; Michael Oliviere^{[p]}; Lawrence Parker^{[p]}; Scott Sterling^{[p]}	T-Minus; Cole^{[a]}; I. Hamad^{[a]}	4:58
8.	"I Love Her Again"	Cole; Jacob Dutton; Lonnie Lynn^{[q]}; James Yancey^{[q]}; Bobby Caldwell^{[q]}; Bruce Malament^{[q]}; Norman Harris^{[q]}; Phillip Nimmons^{[q]}	Cole; Jake One^{[a]}	5:32
9.	"What If" (with Morray)	Cole; Morae Ruffin; Eliot Dubock; Donte Perkins; Williams; Wooten	Beat Butcha; Tae Beast; T-Minus^{[a]}; Wu10^{[a]}	5:19
10.	"Quik Stop"	Cole; D. Coleman; Holmes; Wooten; Devin Copeland^{[r]}; Robert McQueen^{[r]}; Dexter Johnson^{[r]}	Cole; DZL; Omen; Wu10^{[a]}	4:24
11.	"And the Whole World Is the Ville"	Cole; Dieng; O'Kelly Isley Jr.^{[s]}; Rudolph Isley^{[s]}; Ronald Isley^{[s]}; Chris Jasper^{[s]}; Omar Davis^{[s]}; Jonathan Billingslea^{[s]}; Marcus Shaw^{[s]}; Steven Curry^{[s]}	AzizTheShake; FnZ; BoogzDaBeast	4:35
12.	"Ocean Way" (bonus track)	Cole; Linaburg; Gilmore; Wooten	Cole; Linaburg; Gilmore; Wu10^{[a]}	2:34
Total length:				53:14

Notes

- ^{^[a]}additional producer
- "Safety" and "Who TF Iz U" are stylized in all caps
- "And the Whole World Is the Ville" is stylized as "and the whole world is the Ville"
- "Poor Thang" features uncredited vocals by Westside Gunn

Sample and interpolation credits

- ^{^[b]}"29 Intro" samples "Carolina in My Mind", written and performed by James Taylor.
- ^{^[c]}"Two Six" interpolates "Trial Time", written and performed by Donald "the Last Mr. Bigg" Pears II
- ^{^[d]}"Safety" samples "U.N.I.T.Y.", written by Dana Owens and Joseph Sample, and performed by Queen Latifah
- "Run a Train" contains an uncredited sample of "Dear Jesus", written by Wendy Campbell, produced by Lloyd Smith, and performed by Power & Light Co.
- ^{^[e]}"Poor Thang" samples "Set It Off", written by Torence Hatch, Markus Roach, and Jeremy "Mouse" Allen, and performed by Boosie Badazz, and "Who Am I", written by Walter "Bunny" Sigler and Phillip Hurtt, and performed by the O'Jays
- ^{^[f]}"Legacy" samples "Love Sign", written by Leroy Emmanuel and performed by the Counts
- ^{^[g]}"Bunce Road Blues" interpolates "Nice & Slow", written by Usher Raymond IV, Brian Casey, Jermaine Dupri Mauldin, and Manuel Seal, and performed by Usher; and contains an uncredited sample of "Pokey Nova", written by Thomas Schwabe, and performed by Jürgen Waidele
- "Who TF Iz U" contains an uncredited sample of "Can't Help But Love You", written by Michael Gately and Robert John, and performed by the Whispers; and "Drop a Gem on 'Em", written and performed by Mobb Deep (Albert Johnson and Kejuan Muchita); and an uncredited interpolation of "Some Cut", written by Donnell Prince, Jamal Glaze, Lawrence Edwards, Jonathan "Lil Jon" Smith, Craig Love, and LaMarquis Jefferson, and performed by Trillville
- ^{^[h]}"Drum n Bass" samples "One Flight Up", written and performed by Scott Cossu
- ^{^[i]}"Bombs in the Ville/Hit the Gas" samples "What's Your Fantasy", written by Christopher Bridges and Shondrae Crawford, and performed by Ludacris
- ^{^[j]}"Lonely at the Top" samples "Intro: Babs", written by Jeremie Pennick, Amber Croskery, and Thomas Paladino, and performed by Benny the Butcher
- ^{^[k]}"39 Intro" samples "Never Let You Be Without Love", written and performed by Willie Hutch
- ^{^[l]}"The Villest" interpolates "Elevators (Me & You)", written and performed by Outkast (Antwan Patton and André Benjamin); and samples "Born to Lose You", written by Barbara Gaskins and performed by Ecstasy, Passion & Pain
- ^{^[m]}"Old Dog" interpolates "Raise Up", written by Moses Barrett III and Timothy Mosley, and performed by Petey Pablo; and "24's", written by Clifford Harris and Aldrin Davis, and performed by T.I.
- ^{^[n]}"Life Sentence" samples "Four Times a Lady" (Live), written by Craig David and Fraser Thorneycroft-Smith, and performed by David; and interpolates "How's It Goin' Down", written by Earl Simmons and Anthony "PK" Fields, and performed by DMX
- ^{^[o]}"Only You" interpolates "Footprints", written by Alistaire McCalla, Roshaun Clarke, Xavier Davidson, Craig Thompson, Donovan "Don Corleon" Bennett, Nigel Staff, and Wayne Morris, and performed by T.O.K.; samples "Longing For", written by Siccature "Jah Cure" Alcock, Bennett, Staff, and Morris, and performed by Jah Cure; and interpolates a spoken word poem by Eva Fontes
- ^{^[p]}"Man Up Above" samples "Holly", written and performed by William "Smokey" Robinson, samples "Never Would Have Made It", written by Marvin Sapp and Matthew Brownie and performed by Sapp, and interpolates "Jenny from the Block", written by Jennifer Lopez, Jason Phillips, David Styles, Andre Deyo, Troy Oliver, Jean-Claude Olivier, Samuel Barnes, José Fernando Arbex, Michael Oliviere, Lawrence Parker, and Scott Sterling, and performed by Lopez
- ^{^[q]}"I Love Her Again" samples "The Light", written by Lonnie Lynn, James Yancey, Robert Caldwell, Bruce Malament, and Norman Harris, and performed by Common; and "Atlantic Suite – Harbours", written and performed by Phillip Nimmons
- ^{^[r]}"Quik Stop" interpolates "Just Tryin ta Live", written by Devin Copeland, Robert McQueen, and Dexter Johnson, and performed by Devin the Dude
- ^{^[s]}"And the Whole World Is the Ville" samples "Love Put Me on the Corner", written by O'Kelly Isley, Rudolph Isley, Ronald Isley, and Chris Jasper, and performed by the Isley Brothers; and "Fayetteville", written by Omar Davis, Jonathan Billingslea, Marcus Shaw, and Steven Curry, and performed by Ground Zero

== Personnel ==
These credits have been adapted from music streaming services Apple Music and Tidal. Additionally, Cole, Ibrahim "Ib" Hamad, Tyler "T-Minus" Williams, and record label Dreamville are credited as executive producers.

=== Disc 29 ===
- Jermaine Cole – recording (1–3, 5–6, 8, 10, 12)
- Paris Jones – additional vocals (3, 6)
- Steve Bilodeau – guitar (4–6, 11)
- Luca Mauti – guitar (6)
- David Linaburg – guitar (12)
- Brayon "Mook Got the Keys" Nelson – keyboards (6)
- Ron Gilmore Jr. – keyboards (7)
- Margaux "Yuli" Whitney – strings (7)
- Kuldeep Chudasama – recording assistance (1, 3), recording (4–12)
- Fareed Salamah – recording (2)
- Eric Manco – recording (4, 7)
- Gosha Usov – recording (11)
- Joel Olivier Vaval – recording assistance (2)
- Jose Trujillo – recording assistance (2)
- Hayden Duncan – recording assistance (4)
- Nico Patino – recording assistance (4), additional engineering (7)
- Lou Carrao – recording assistance (5–6, 11)
- Lauren Marquez – recording assistance (6)
- Michael Deano – recording assistance (6)
- Zach Lamb – recording assistance (6)
- Erik Pederson – recording assistance (9)
- Terence Brandt – recording assistance (9)
- Beatriz Artola – recording assistance (11)
- Mike Leonardo – recording assistance (12)
- Tristan Bott – recording assistance (12)
- Aaron Jahnke – additional engineering (7)
- Jake Jensen – additional engineering (7)
- Matt Lindsey – additional engineering (7)
- Rob Moreno – additional engineering (7)
- Justin Klatzko – additional engineering (8)
- Juro "Mez" Davis – mixing (all)
- Joe LaPorta – mastering (all)

=== Disc 39 ===
- Jermaine Cole – recording (1, 4, 8)
- Steve Bilodeau – guitar (1, 5; specified as acoustic guitar on 5)
- Kelvin "Wu10" Wooten – bass (1, 3, 5), guitar (2, 5; specified as electric guitar on 5), piano (2), strings (3)
- Michael "DZL" Holmes – drum programming (3)
- Tyler "T-Minus" Williams – drum programming (3)
- Margaux "Yuli" Whitney – strings arranger (10)
- Kuldeep Chudasama – recording (1–7, 9–12)
- Mike Chavarria – recording (3)
- Fareed Salamah – recording (5)
- Javier Gonzalez Valverde – recording (9)
- Tate Sablatura – recording (12)
- Greg Truitt – recording assistance (1), additional engineering (6)
- Michael Deano – recording assistance (1), additional engineering (6)
- Stephen Trischitta – recording assistance (1)
- Felipe Trujillo – recording assistance (2)
- Ramses Ascanio – recording assistance (2)
- Timothy "Quik Keys" Kahwa – recording assistance (3, 10)
- Dick Hodgin – recording assistance (4)
- Laura Garcia – recording assistance (5)
- Lucas Gallo – recording assistance (7)
- Dani Perez – recording assistance (8)
- Joel Olivier Vaval – recording assistance (9, 11)
- Jose Trujillo – recording assistance (9, 11)
- Jesse Ray Ernster – mixing assistance (6)
- Harley Arsenault – additional engineering (6)
- Jackson Haile – additional engineering (6)
- Jake Rones – additional engineering (6)
- Jase Keithley – additional engineering (12)
- Juro "Mez" Davis – mixing (all)
- Joe LaPorta – mastering (all)

== Charts ==
Chart performance for The Fall-Off
Chart (2026)	Peak position
Australian Albums (ARIA)	7
Australian Hip Hop/R&B Albums (ARIA)	1
Austrian Albums (Ö3 Austria)	17
Belgian Albums (Ultratop Flanders)	16
Belgian Albums (Ultratop Wallonia)	140
Canadian Albums (Billboard)	2
Danish Albums (Hitlisten)	7
Dutch Albums (Album Top 100)	5
French Albums (SNEP)	70
German Albums (Offizielle Top 100)	29
German Hip-Hop Albums (Offizielle Top 100)	3
Hungarian Albums (MAHASZ)	15
Irish Albums (Official Charts)	8
Italian Albums (FIMI)	51
Japanese Download Albums (Billboard Japan)	82
Lithuanian Albums (AGATA)	13
New Zealand Albums (RMNZ)	2
Norwegian Albums (IFPI Norge)	9
Portuguese Albums (AFP)	3
Swedish Albums (Sverigetopplistan)	23
Swedish Hip-Hop Albums (Sverigetopplistan)	2
Swiss Albums (Schweizer Hitparade)	2
UK Albums (Official Charts)	3
UK R&B Albums (Official Charts)	6
US Billboard 200	1
US Top R&B/Hip-Hop Albums (Billboard)	1

== See also ==
- 2026 in hip-hop
