= Who TF Iz U =

2026 song by J. Cole

Single by J. Cole

from the album The Fall-Off
- Released: February 11, 2026
- Recorded: 2016–2026
- Genre: Hip-hop
- Length: 4:37
- Label: Dreamville; Interscope
- Songwriters: Jermaine Cole; Tyler Williams; Anderson Hernandez; Harvey Fuqua; John Bristol; Beatrice Verdi
- Producers: Cole; T-Minus; Vinylz; FnZ; Steve Bilodeau; Scotty Coleman

J. Cole singles chronology
"Clouds" (2025)	"Who TF Iz U" (2026)	"Legacy" (2026)

"Who TF Iz U" is a song by American rapper J. Cole. It was sent to U.S. rhythmic radio on February 11, 2026 as the lead single from his seventh studio album, The Fall-Off (2026). It was produced by Cole himself, T-Minus, Vinylz, FnZ, Steve Bilodeau and Scotty Coleman. The song contains a sample of "Can't Help But Love You" by The Whispers and interpolation of "Some Cut" by Trillville.

== Composition ==
J. Cole raps over the "Can't Help But Love You" sample, which is later followed by a speedy beat switch. The lyrics include him underscoring the value of humility.

== Critical reception ==
The song received generally positive reviews. Billboard's Carl Lamarre ranked it as the eighth best song from The Fall-Off, commenting that J. Cole's "wordplay reaches a fever pitch". He additionally wrote, "Undeterred, Cole excavates through the track with relative ease, flexing his dexterity like a first-ballot Hall of Famer." Alexander Cole of HotNewHipHop stated "there is no denying that this is a song in which Cole is showcasing a more aggressive side. He is trying to make a big statement with this song, especially coming off the more melodic 'Bunce Road Blues.' Overall, we are impressed with the wide variety of sounds Cole is bringing on this album, and we can't wait to tap into more." Consequence's Kiana Fitzgerald described the song as "dense, bass-indebted" and that it "bring[s] forth the animated J. Cole who's worthy of the Big 3 status." Reviewing The Fall-Off for Rolling Stone, Mosi Reeves wrote "The music often descends into a pleasant muddle, populated by tasteful notes made famous by others, yet enlivened by sharp bars such as 'I blaze by graveyards and destitute economies/Full of thug bones for refusin' to move in harmony' on 'Who TF Iz U.'" Pitchfork's Benny Sun had a more mixed reaction to the song, noting that its interpolation of "Some Cut" was already used in the song "What It Is (Block Boy)" by Doechii. He still considered it a strong song, but one that "do[es] little to quell the narrative that J. Cole has been a step behind his peers for a while now." William Rosebury of The Line of Best Fit considered the song within the "most accomplished run on the album", particularly complimenting its "braggadocious bars". Reviewing the album for Exclaim!, Vernon Ayiku praised J. Cole for displaying his "sharpest lyrical precision to date", writing "The rhyme schemes are tighter and more intricate, particularly on the first verse of 'Who TF Iz U,' where he layers dense, multi-syllabic patterns without sacrificing clarity or focus."

== Charts ==
Chart performance for "Who TF Iz U"
Chart (2026)	Peak position
Canada Hot 100 (Billboard)	59
Global 200 (Billboard)	88
South Africa Streaming (TOSAC)	16
US Billboard Hot 100	32
US Hot R&B/Hip-Hop Songs (Billboard)	11
US Rhythmic Airplay (Billboard)	2
US R&B/Hip-Hop Airplay (Billboard)	20
