= Two Six =

2026 song by J. Cole

Song by J. Cole

from the album The Fall-Off
- Released: February 6, 2026
- Recorded: 2016–2026
- Genre: Hip-hop; trap
- Length: 3:16
- Label: Dreamville; Interscope
- Songwriters: Jermaine Cole; Tyler Williams; Damon Coleman; Ron Gilmore Jr.; Donald Pears II
- Producers: T-Minus; Omen; Gilmore

Music video
- "Two Six" on YouTube

"Two Six" is a song by American rapper J. Cole, released on February 6, 2026, from his seventh studio album, The Fall-Off. Produced by T-Minus, Omen and Ron Gilmore Jr., it contains an interpolation of "Trial Time" by Mr. Bigg. The title references a nickname of Cole's hometown Fayetteville, North Carolina, the "2-6".

== Critical reception ==
The song received critical acclaim. Carl Lamarre of Billboard placed it at number 21 in his ranking of the songs from The Fall-Off. He wrote that the first verse "feels like a warm-up for J. Cole" and "While the production carries a high-level cinematic feel, it's not until the second verse that Cole really revs things up lyrically. 'Two Six' is a decent start for Cole, and a solid wake-up call for anyone looking for more energy from him." Alexander Cole of HotNewHipHop remarked "As you will hear from this song, Cole is rapping his a** off. The beat is hard as hell, and the artist sounds as confident as ever. There is something truly mesmerizing about this track, and we like the direction that Cole is going in here. There are some slower rapping passages, while the artist also speeds things along at times. It is a great way to open up the album, and we're sure there are a lot of fans out there who will agree. Hopefully, this is energy that Cole keeps for the rest of the album." Reviewing The Fall-Off for Clash, Robin Murray wrote "'Two Six' goes wild, followed by the neck-snapping 'SAFETY'. It's a high-octane opening gambit, fuelled by Cole's innate musicality." Kiana Fitzgerald of Consequence regarded the song as one of the strongest parts of the album and similar to Drake's style, stating that it "bring[s] forth the animated J. Cole who's worthy of the Big 3 status." Writing for Slant Magazine, Paul Attard commented "Cole can still tear through a verse with athletic verve, which he does on 'Two Six'". Benny Sun of Pitchfork called it a "kill-'em-all tough-guy moment with a hook uncannily reminiscent of Sexyy Red's on 'SkeeYee.'" William Rosebury of The Line of Best Fit commented that the song "opens the album with a rare ferocity" from Cole and described it as "the perfect opener, with the juxtaposition of Taylor's folky depiction shattering under the reality of Cole's own memory of his hometown."

== Music video ==
An official music video premiered alongside the song. Directed by Simon Chasalow, it features a grainy aesthetic and scenes that are filmed in both black-and-white and saturated color in striking contrast. The clip opens with an excerpt from "The Let Out", another track on The Fall-Off, before showing gritty visuals of Fayetteville. J. Cole appears in multiple environments, including on a train track and riding his bike with wired headphones.

== Charts ==
Chart performance for "Two Six"
Chart (2026)	Peak position
Australia (ARIA)	73
Canada Hot 100 (Billboard)	26
Global 200 (Billboard)	33
Greece International (IFPI)	62
Ireland (IRMA)	57
New Zealand Hot Singles (RMNZ)	3
Nigeria (TurnTable Top 100)	92
Portugal (AFP)	107
South Africa Streaming (TOSAC)	6
UK Singles (Official Charts)	45
US Billboard Hot 100	16
US Hot R&B/Hip-Hop Songs (Billboard)	3
