= Poor Things (disambiguation) =

Poor Things is a novel published in 1992.

Poor Things may also refer to:

- Poor Things (film), a 2023 film by Yorgos Lanthimos.
- Poor Things (soundtrack), the accompanying soundtrack for the film.
- "Poor Thing", a musical number in Sweeney Todd: The Demon Barber of Fleet Street.
- "Poor Thang", a song by J. Cole
