= Legacy (J. Cole and PJ song) =

2026 song by J. Cole and PJ

Single by J. Cole and PJ

from the album The Fall-Off
- Released: May 19, 2026
- Recorded: 2016–2026
- Genre: R&B, pop rap
- Length: 3:56
- Label: Dreamville; Interscope
- Songwriters: Jermaine Cole; Tyler Williams
- Producer: T-Minus

J. Cole singles chronology
"Who TF Iz U" (2026)	"Legacy" (2026)

"Legacy" is a song by American rapper J. Cole and American singer PJ. It was released on February 6, 2026 from J. Cole's seventh studio album, The Fall-Off. Produced by T-Minus, it was released as the second radio single from The Fall-Off on May 19, 2026.

== Reception ==
Carl Lamarre of Billboard stated that Cole still in constant search of something more. He relishes staring into his rearview and sitting in his temporary pocket of bliss, aware of what it brings to the table. And even knowing he shouldn’t send that text, he can’t help but wonder what slipped through his fingers. For Cole, “Legacy” lands middle of the road."

== Credits and personnel ==
- J. Cole – vocals, songwriting
- PJ – vocals, songwriting
- T-Minus – production, songwriting
- Kuldeep Chudasama – mastering, mixing, recording, production

== Charts ==
Chart performance for "Legacy"
Chart (2026)	Peak position
US Billboard Hot 100	36
US Hot R&B/Hip-Hop Songs (Billboard)	14
US Rhythmic Airplay (Billboard)	1
