= Ready '24 =

Song by J. Cole featuring Cam'ron

from the album Might Delete Later
- Released: April 5, 2024
- Recorded: June 2022
- Studio: Electric Lady (New York City)
- Length: 3:30
- Label: Cole World; Interscope
- Songwriters: Jermaine Cole; Cameron Giles; Abdul Aziz Dieng; Kelvin Wooten; Michael Holmes; Tyler Williams
- Producers: AzizTheShake; DZL; T-Minus; Wu10

"Ready '24" is a song by American rapper J. Cole from his fourth mixtape Might Delete Later (2024). It features American rapper Cam'ron and was produced by AzizTheShake, DZL, T-Minus, and Wu10. The instrumental is a reworking of the instrumental to "I'm Ready" (2003) by Cam'ron's group, the Diplomats. "Ready '24" became the subject of a lawsuit by Cam'ron against J. Cole in October 2025; Cam'ron alleged contractual violations and unpaid royalties. Cam'ron and Cole reconciled in March 2026, and the lawsuit was settled out of court in May 2026.

== Critical reception ==
Robin Murray of Clash described the song as "a muscular, pulse-quickening experience, made all the more so by situating it against the cartoonish 'Huntin' Wabbitz'". Paul A. Thompson of Pitchfork wrote that in the song, "Cole begins by approximating Juelz Santana's style (spare, epigrammatic), then ratchets up the pace and word count. There is an indelible quality to the best Juelz verses that few rappers could ever replicate, but this is one of Cole's best showings on Might Delete Later—and recalls certain stretches of To Pimp a Butterfly, where Kendrick grafted more syllables onto airy P-funk beats than many of that style's originators ever had."

== Legal action ==
Cam'ron first collaborated with Cole on "95 South" (2021) and then again on "Ready '24". Cam'ron filed a lawsuit against Cole in New York in October 2025, seeking $500 thousand United States dollars. In his claim, he alleged that these collaborations came with the agreement that Cole would return the favor, either by featuring on a song or by appearing on Cam'ron's podcast. The filing, which claimed that Cam'ron and Cole recorded "Ready '24" together in June 2022, said that Cole was repeatedly asked over the next two years to fulfill his promise but did not, that "Ready '24" was released without authorization, and that Cam'ron had not received royalties for the song. Cole and his team filed a motion to dismiss in February 2026, denying all allegations. The two reconciled when Cole appeared on Cam'ron's Talk with Flee podcast in March 2026. Cam'ron explained that he did not expect the lawsuit to go to trial but felt it was necessary to get Cole's attention; Cole sympathized with Cam'ron's perspective. Both parties' attorneys wrote in a May 2026 court filing that the lawsuit had been settled out of court.

== Charts ==
Chart performance for "Ready '24"
Chart (2024)	Peak position
Canada Hot 100 (Billboard)	57
Global 200 (Billboard)	77
South Africa (TOSAC)	15
US Billboard Hot 100	38
US Hot R&B/Hip-Hop Songs (Billboard)	20

== Credits ==
Personnel

- Jermaine Cole (J. Cole) – songwriting, vocals
- Cameron Giles (Cam'ron) – songwriting, vocals
- Abdul Aziz Dieng (AzizTheShake) – songwriting, production
- Kelvin Wooten (Wu10) – songwriting, production
- Michael Holmes (DZL) – songwriting, production, drum programming
- Tyler Williams (T-Minus) – songwriting, production, keyboard
- Kuldeep – recording
- Mez – mixing
- Joe LaPorta – mastering

Sample

Although the sample is uncredited, multiple publications note that "Ready '24" is a reworking of:

- "I'm Ready" (2003) by the Diplomats, which itself samples "Yes, I'm Ready" (1965) by Barbara Mason

Studio

- Electric Lady Studios
