= HYB =

HYB may refer to:

- Honeybourne railway station, in England
- Hyderabad Deccan railway station, in India
- "H.Y.B." (song), a song by J. Cole featuring Bas and Central Cee
