= Clouds (J. Cole song) =

2025 song by J. Cole

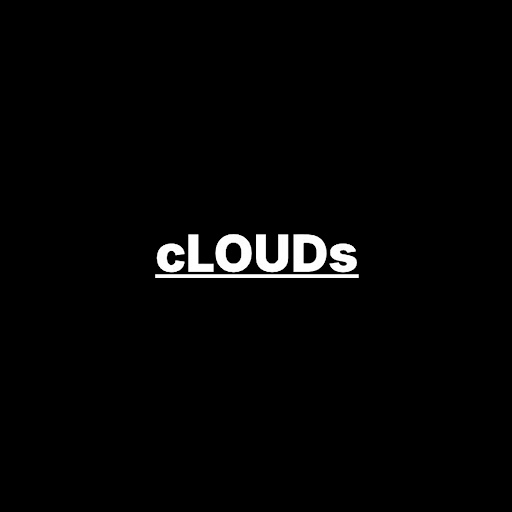

Single by J. Cole
- Released: February 20, 2025
- Genre: Conscious hip-hop; chillhop
- Songwriters: Jermaine Cole; Jonathan New
- Producers: J. Cole; DZL; Omen

J. Cole singles chronology
"Port Antonio" (2024)	"Clouds" (2025)	"Who TF Iz U" (2026)

"Clouds" (stylized as "cLOUDs") is a 2025 song by American rapper J. Cole. It was released on Cole's blog, The Algorithm, on February 20, 2025.

== Background ==
In January 2025, Cole announced The Algorithm, a blog which he would use to post random content for an audience smaller and more curated than social media. He then clarified that the move was not, in fact, indicative of an album forthcoming. However, in February used his blog to discuss his plans to make more music henceforth, citing his recent inconsistency. Prior to "Clouds", Cole hadn't released music since the song "Port Antonio" the previous October and Might Delete Later in April.

Shortly after, he released "Clouds" on The Algorithm with a note stating that he had made the song a few days prior and felt that it would be appropriate to release it on his blog. He also stated that he had come up with the song's title within twenty minutes and credits DZL and Omen for the song's production in addition to "small contributions" from himself.

== Composition ==
The song covers a litany of topics ranging from the assassination attempt on Donald Trump, the complexities of fame, and the dangers which artists face from artificial intelligence.

The song's production has been described as "dreamy", "contemplative", and "intense", with "wordplay riddled verses in which [Cole] gets deep into his lyrical bag".

== Critical reception ==
Robin Murray, writing for Clash, stated: "As a spotlight for his rap abilities, 'cLOUDs' could scarcely be stronger—a fantastic piece of work, the novelistic stretch moves from taking down the billionaire elite to critiquing the role of AI in music in just a few minutes... a reminder not only of Cole's worth, but of an entire era." HotNewHipHop ranked the song as the 5th best rap song of 2025.

American rapper Freddie Gibbs criticized Cole for rapping about surpassing other rappers despite backing out of "rap beefs", a callback to the Drake–Kendrick Lamar feud in which Cole released and subsequently retracted his "7 Minute Drill" diss track against Kendrick Lamar.

Via tweet, American basketball player Kevin Durant referred to the song as "mastery" and stated that he did not care about "fake tough" guys. The latter statement stirred controversy, as some believed it to be "throwing shade" at musicians like Drake and Lamar.

== Charts ==
Chart performance for "Clouds"
Chart (2025)	Peak position
Canada Hot 100 (Billboard)	94
Global 200 (Billboard)	175
New Zealand Hot Singles (RMNZ)	7
US Billboard Hot 100	69
US Hot R&B/Hip-Hop Songs (Billboard)	21
