= Nikhil Seetharam =

Nikhil
- Also known as: Kromatik
- Born: Nikhil Seetharam
- Origin: Toronto, Ontario, Canada
- Genres: Hip hop; R&B
- Occupations: Record producer; songwriter
- Instruments: Keyboards; sampler
- Label: EMI
- Publishers: Sony Music Publishing, SESAC
- Website: nikhilseetharam.com

Nikhil Seetharam is a Canadian composer, songwriter, and record producer based in Toronto, Ontario. A Grammy Award recipient and two-time Canadian Screen Award winner, Seetharam first rose to prominence as a multi-platinum hip hop and R&B producer, crafting tracks for artists including Drake, Kendrick Lamar, Nicki Minaj, and DJ Khaled.

He later transitioned into composing original music for television and feature films, collaborating with networks such as Disney+, HBO, and Hulu. His credits include the CTV and The Roku Channel comedy series Children Ruin Everything, the Netflix teen drama Geek Girl, the Vice Studios docuseries Dark Side of the Cage, and the 2026 feature film Back in Black starring Christopher Walken.

== Career ==
=== Hip hop production (2010–2018) ===
Seetharam began producing hip hop in Toronto during the late 2000s and early 2010s, frequently collaborating with producer T-Minus under the early production moniker Kromatik. In 2010, he co-produced Nicki Minaj's breakthrough single "Moment 4 Life" (featuring Drake), which achieved multi-platinum certification and peaked at number 13 on the US Billboard Hot 100. That same year, he contributed production to T.I.'s No Mercy ("Poppin Bottles") and Ciara's Basic Instinct ("Turn It Up").

In 2011, Seetharam contributed to DJ Khaled's single "I'm On One" and co-produced "Make Me Proud" (featuring Nicki Minaj) on Drake's sophomore album Take Care. Take Care won the Grammy Award for Best Rap Album at the 55th Annual Grammy Awards in 2013.

Throughout the 2010s, Seetharam produced records across hip hop and R&B, including Kendrick Lamar's Good Kid, M.A.A.D City ("Swimming Pools (Drank)" [Extended]), Drake's "5 AM in Toronto", A$AP Rocky's Long. Live. ASAP ("PMW"), Lil Wayne's I Am Not a Human Being II ("Rich As Fuck"), T.I.'s Trouble Man: Heavy Is the Head, and Chris Brown's Heartbreak on a Full Moon ("Grass Ain't Greener"). As his career shifted toward composing for the screen, he phased out the Kromatik moniker to work under his own name.

=== Composing for film and television (2019–present) ===
Following his hip hop production career, Seetharam transitioned into composing for film and television, writing original scores across episodic television, docuseries, and feature films. He has composed film and television scores and worked with networks and studios including Disney+, Hulu, BET, CTV, HBO, Netflix, and Crave.

In 2020, he scored the Hulu and CBC Gem sci-fi series Utopia Falls. Between 2021 and 2022, he co-composed for Freeform and Disney+'s Good Trouble (Seasons 3–4), BET's Twenties (Season 2), and The CW's DC drama series Naomi, in addition to providing additional music for HBO's A Black Lady Sketch Show.

In 2022, Seetharam became the lead composer for the CTV comedy series Children Ruin Everything (streamed internationally on The Roku Channel), which earned him a Canadian Screen Award for Best Original Music in a Comedy in 2025. He scored the 2024 Netflix teen drama series Geek Girl, and subsequently composed the score for Vice Studios Canada's investigative docuseries Dark Side of the Cage: The Disappearance of Ronda Rousey, winning the 2026 Canadian Screen Award for Best Original Music, Factual / Unscripted.

In 2026, Seetharam composed the original score for the comedy-drama feature film Back in Black, directed by Ron Murphy and starring Academy Award winner Christopher Walken, Ella Ballentine, and Jane Curtin. The film held its world premiere as an official Centrepiece selection at the 2026 Toronto International Film Festival (TIFF).

== Music ==
=== 2010 ===
- T.I. – No Mercy
  - "Poppin Bottles" (featuring Drake) (produced with T-Minus)
- Ciara – Basic Instinct
  - "Turn It Up" (featuring Usher) (produced with T-Minus)
- Nicki Minaj – Pink Friday
  - "Moment 4 Life" (featuring Drake) (produced with T-Minus)

=== 2011 ===
- DJ Khaled – We the Best Forever
  - "I'm On One" (featuring Drake, Rick Ross, and Lil Wayne) (produced with T-Minus)
- Drake – Take Care
  - "Make Me Proud" (featuring Nicki Minaj) (produced with T-Minus)

=== 2012 ===
- Nicki Minaj – Pink Friday: Roman Reloaded
  - "Champion" (featuring Nas, Drake, and Young Jeezy) (produced with T-Minus)
- Tank – This Is How I Feel
  - "Compliments" (featuring Kris Stephens and T.I.) (produced with T-Minus)
- Slaughterhouse – Welcome to: Our House
  - "Frat House" (produced with T-Minus)
- Kendrick Lamar – Good Kid, M.A.A.D City
  - "Swimming Pools (Drank)" [Extended Version] (produced with T-Minus)
- T.I. – Trouble Man: Heavy Is the Head
  - "Go Get It" (produced with T-Minus)
  - "Guns and Roses" (featuring P!nk) (produced with T-Minus)
- A$AP Rocky – Long. Live. ASAP
  - "PMW (All I Need)" (featuring ScHoolboy Q) (produced with T-Minus)

=== 2013 ===
- Drake
  - "5 AM in Toronto" (produced with Boi-1da)
- T.I.
  - "My Potna"
- Lil Wayne – I Am Not a Human Being II
  - "Rich As Fuck" (featuring 2 Chainz) (produced with T-Minus)
- Justin Bieber – Journals
  - "Bad Day" (produced with T-Minus)

=== 2014 ===
- Kelly Rowland – Talk a Good Game
  - "Love Me 'Til I Die" (Bonus track)
- Que – Can U Digg It?
  - "Diamonds" (featuring August Alsina)
- Nelly Furtado
  - "Wild Side"

=== 2015 ===
- Marc E. Bassy – East Hollywood
  - "XX"
  - "On Top"

=== 2016 ===
- Chris Brown – Heartbreak on a Full Moon
  - "Grass Ain't Greener"
- Chris Brown & OHB – Before the Trap: Nights in Tarzana
  - "I Need Love"

== Filmography ==
=== 2012 ===
- Searching for Angels – feature film (starring Vivica A. Fox and Veronika London)

=== 2020 ===
- Utopia Falls – Hulu series created by R.T. Thorne & Joseph Mallozzi

=== 2021 ===
- Good Trouble (Season 3) – Freeform series created by Joanna Johnson, Bradley Bredeweg, and Peter Paige. Composed with Amanda Jones.
- Twenties (Season 2) – BET series created by Lena Waithe. Composed with Amanda Jones.
- A Black Lady Sketch Show (Season 2) – HBO series created by Robin Thede. Additional Music.

=== 2022 ===
- Children Ruin Everything – CTV/Roku series created by Chuck Tatham, Kurt Smeaton, and Mark Montefiore.
- Naomi – DC Entertainment/Warner Bros. Television series created by Ava DuVernay. Composed with Amanda Jones.
- Good Trouble (Season 4) – Freeform series created by Joanna Johnson, Bradley Bredeweg, and Peter Paige. Composed with Amanda Jones.

=== 2024 ===
- Geek Girl – Netflix series created by Holly Smale and Jessica Ruston.

=== 2025 ===
- Dark Side of the Cage – Crave / Vice Studios docuseries.

=== 2026 ===
- Back in Black – feature film directed by Ron Murphy (starring Christopher Walken, Ella Ballentine, and Jane Curtin); Centrepiece presentation at the 2026 Toronto International Film Festival.

== Awards and nominations ==
Year	Award	Category	Nominated work	Result
2013	Grammy Awards	Best Rap Album (contributor)	Take Care (Drake)	Won
2025	Canadian Screen Awards	Best Original Music, Comedy	Children Ruin Everything	Won
2026	Canadian Screen Awards	Best Original Music, Factual / Unscripted	Dark Side of the Cage: The Disappearance of Ronda Rousey	Won
