= We the Best Forever =

Studio album by DJ Khaled
- Released: July 19, 2011
- Recorded: October 2010 – May 2011
- Studios: We the Best Studios, North Miami, YMCMB Studios, New Orleans, Hollygrove
- Genre: Hip-hop
- Length: 53:42
- Labels: We the Best; Young Money; Cash Money; Universal Motown
- Producers: Ben Diehl; Cubic Z; Tha Bizness; Boi-1da; Danja; DJ Khaled; DJ Nasty; Infinity; The Inkredibles; Lex Luger; Luis Diaz; The Monarch; Noah "40" Shebib; The Renegades; The Runners; T-Minus

DJ Khaled chronology
Victory (2010)	We the Best Forever (2011)	Kiss the Ring (2012)

Singles from DJ Khaled
- 1. "Welcome to My Hood" Released: February 1, 2011; 2. "I'm on One" Released: May 20, 2011; 3. "It Ain't Over Til It's Over" Released: July 8, 2011; 4. "Legendary" Released: October 4, 2011

We the Best Forever is the fifth studio album by American disc jockey and record producer DJ Khaled. It was released on July 19, 2011, by We the Best Music Group, Young Money Entertainment, Cash Money Records, and Universal Motown Records. It is his first album to be released on a major label, his first four albums being released on the independent label Koch Records, which later changed its name to E1 Music. The album also features guest appearances from Drake, Rick Ross, Lil Wayne, Plies, T-Pain, Jeezy, Ludacris, Waka Flocka Flame, Ace Hood, Mary J. Blige, Fabolous, Jadakiss, Chris Brown, Keyshia Cole, Ne-Yo, The Game, Busta Rhymes, CeeLo Green, Birdman, Meek Mill, Wale, Vado, Big Sean, Akon, B.o.B, Tyga, Cory Gunz, Mack Maine, Jae Millz, Kevin Rudolf, Twista, Mavado, Fat Joe, and Bun B.

== Background ==
Khaled announced via Twitter on August 16, 2010 that the album would be titled We the Best Forever. On August 19, 2010, three days after announcing the album title he announced he had signed with Cash Money Records. On December 7, 2010 Khaled said the album was 75% done.

Khaled confirmed in September 2010 that the people he's made past hits with including, Birdman, Lil Wayne, would be featured on the project. Khaled revealed that he really wanted Eminem featured on one of his "street anthems" and asked Eminem to "do it for hip hop music as a whole." In February 2011 Khaled confirmed that Drake, Rick Ross, T-Pain, and Plies will be featured in the album. In April 2011, Khaled revealed additional guest appearances, including Fabolous, Young Jeezy, Fat Joe, Ace Hood, B.o.B, CeeLo Green, Keyshia Cole, Ne-Yo, Chris Brown, and Akon. On his first webisode Khaled confirmed production from The Runners on the album.

== Singles ==
Khaled originally announced the first single would feature Lil Wayne. The album's first single "Welcome to My Hood" featuring Rick Ross, Plies, Lil Wayne, and T-Pain, and produced by The Renegades, Cubic Z, DJ Nasty & LVM, and Khaled was released on January 18, 2011. It peaked on the Billboard Hot 100 at number seventy-nine. On February 10, 2011, the music video was released for "Welcome to My Hood" featuring Rick Ross, Plies, Lil Wayne, and T-Pain. On April 27, 2011, the music video was released for the "Welcome to My Hood" (Remix) featuring T-Pain, Ludacris, Busta Rhymes, Twista, Mavado, Birdman, Ace Hood, The Game, Fat Joe, Jadakiss, Bun B and Waka Flocka Flame.

On May 12, 2011, Khaled premiered the second single titled "I'm On One" featuring Drake, Rick Ross and Lil Wayne and produced by T-Minus, Noah "40" Shebib, and Kromatik. It was released in the United States for digital download on May 20, 2011, and was released to U.S mainstream radio on August 23. It debuted on the Billboard Hot 100 at number seventy-eight, and has since peaked at number ten, becoming his then highest peaking song on the chart. On June 26, 2011, the music video was released for "I'm On One" featuring Drake, Rick Ross and Lil Wayne.

The next single with a video to be released is Infinity-produced "It Ain't Over Til It's Over", featuring Mary J. Blige, Fabolous, and Jadakiss, released on iTunes on July 8. The next day, the official music video for "It Ain't Over Til It's Over" was premiered. The song was released to U.S. Rhythmic radio on August 30.

The fourth single is "Legendary", featuring R&B singers Chris Brown, Keyshia Cole, and Ne-Yo. It was produced by DJ Nasty, Cubic Z & LVM, and was released to U.S. Rhythmic radio on October 4, 2011.

== Reception ==
=== Critical reception ===
Professional ratings
Aggregate scores
Source	Rating
Metacritic	61/100
Review scores
Source	Rating
AllMusic	3.5/5 stars
HipHopDX	3.5/5 stars
Now	2/5 stars
PopMatters	4/10
Rolling Stone	3/5 stars
XXL	(XL)

We the Best Forever was met with generally positive reviews from music critics. At Metacritic, which assigns a normalized rating out of 100 to reviews from mainstream critics, the album received an average score of 61, based on 7 reviews, indicating "generally favorable reviews ". Amanda Bassa of HipHopDX gave the album three out of five stars, saying "At this point listeners are either down with his movement or they aren't, and while We The Best Forever is a solid piece, it's not different enough from his previous work to change any minds about him. But with emcees ranging from Jadakiss to B.o.B., there really is a little something on his latest LP to satisfy just about anyone who enjoys mainstream Hip Hop." AllMusic editor David Jeffries gave the album three and a half stars out of five, saying "We the Best Forever may be DJ Khaled's first release for the Cash Money label, but little else has changed. The good news is that the ringleader's formula of rounding up superstar talent for an album jammed with potential singles still works, unless you think everything on 2011 radio is trash and that big money ruined hip-hop." Adam Fleischer of XXL gave the album an XL, saying "Though the content of We The Best Forever is what we've come to expect from a DJ Khaled offering—grandiose odes to the grind and getting yours—that he understands how to create those better than most is what makes a DJ Khaled track, and album, worthwhile."

Jody Rosen of Rolling Stone gave the album three out of five stars, saying "As usual, his imperial victory-march hip-hop songs are fun, and mildly exhausting." Kevin Ritchie of Now gave the album two out of five stars, saying "DJ Khaled's fifth curatorial compilation of posse raps is a forgettable snapshot of mainstream hip-hop despite an all-star roster of emcees, R&B singers and producers. An industry fixture, the Miami radio DJ and Terror Squad member takes few stylistic chances, making We The Best Forever a mostly tedious listen despite its flashes of lyrical invention." PopMatters contributor David Amidon gave the album a four out of ten, saying "It's certainly worth noting that We the Best Forever is Khaled’s most complete album since its namesake, for whatever that may be worth to you, and despite all kinds of reasons provided to do otherwise (Khaled actually spitting a verse on "Sleep When I’m Gone" comes to mind) it's not an incredible struggle to listen to a Khaled album front-to-back for once."

=== Commercial performance ===
The album debuted at number five on the Billboard 200, selling 53,000 copies its first week.

== Track listing ==
Standard edition
No.	Title	Writer(s)	Producer(s)	Length
1.	"I'm On One" (featuring Drake, Rick Ross and Lil Wayne)	Khaled Khaled; Aubrey Graham; William Roberts; Dwayne Carter, Jr.; Tyler Williams	T-Minus; Noah "40" Shebib^{[b]}; Nikhil "Kromatik" Seetharam^{[b]}	4:56
2.	"Welcome to My Hood" (featuring Rick Ross, Plies, Lil Wayne and T-Pain)	Khaled; Roberts; Algernod Washington; Carter; Faheem Najm; Johnny Mollings	The Renegades; Cubic Z; DJ Khaled^{[a]}; DJ Nasty^{[a]}	4:10
3.	"Money" (featuring Young Jeezy and Ludacris)	Khaled; Jay Jenkins; Chris Bridges; Lexus Lewis	Lex Luger	3:55
4.	"I'm Thuggin" (featuring Waka Flocka Flame and Ace Hood)	Khaled; Juaquin Malphurs; Antoine McCollister; Lewis	Lex Luger	4:16
5.	"It Ain't Over Til It's Over" (featuring Mary J. Blige, Fabolous and Jadakiss)	Khaled; Jason Phillips; Mary Jane Blige; John Jackson; Kelly Sheehan; Olivia Waithe	Infinity & Zaay Alexander	3:13
6.	"Legendary" (featuring Chris Brown, Keyshia Cole and Ne-Yo)	Khaled; Christopher Brown; Keyshia Cole; Shaffer Smith; Lundon Knighten; J. Mollings; Christopher Whitacre; L. Mollings; Justin Henderson; Gary Carolla	Tha Bizness; DJ Nasty & LVM; Gary Carolla; DJ Khaled^{[a]}	4:16
7.	"Sleep When I’m Gone" (featuring The Game, Busta Rhymes and Cee-Lo)	Khaled; Nate Hills; Jayceon Taylor; Timothy Callaway; Trevor Smith; Kelly Sheehan	Danja	5:22
8.	"Can't Stop" (featuring Birdman and T-Pain)	Khaled; Bryan Williams; Najm; Matthew Samuels; Matthew Burnett	Boi-1da; Matthew Burnett; Cubic Z	2:49
9.	"Future" (featuring Ace Hood, Meek Mill, Big Sean, Wale and Vado)	Khaled; Samuels; McCollister; Robert Williams; Sean Anderson; Olubowale Akintimehin; Teeyon Winfree; Maurice Carpenter; J. Mollings; Leigh Elliot; L. Mollings	Boi-1da; The Inkredibles; Bass Line	5:35
10.	"My Life" (featuring Akon and B.o.B)	Khaled; Aliaune Thiam; Bobby Ray Simmons; Luis Diaz; Benjamin Diehl; Kelly Sheehan; Heather Bright	Luis Diaz; Ben Diehl	3:31
11.	"A Million Lights" (featuring Tyga, Mack Maine, Cory Gunz, Jae Millz and Kevin Rudolf)	Khaled; Kevin Rudolf; Michael Stevenson; Jermaine Preyan; Jarvis Mills; Peter Pankey Jr.; Andrew Harr, Jermaine Jackson; Andre Davidson; Sean Davidson; Walter Douglas Powers	The Runners; The Monarch	4:29
12.	"Welcome to My Hood (Remix)" (featuring T-Pain, Ludacris, Busta Rhymes, Twista, Mavado, Birdman, Ace Hood, Fat Joe, The Game, Jadakiss, Bun B and Waka Flocka Flame)	Khaled; Mollings; Mollings; Najm; Christopher Bridges; Smith; Carl Mitchell; David Brooks; Williams; McCollister; Joseph Cartagena; Phillips; Bernard Freeman; Taylor; Malphurs	The Renegades; Cubic Z; DJ Nasty & LVM^{[a]}; DJ Khaled^{[a]}	7:10
Total length:				53:42

Deluxe edition bonus tracks
No.	Title	Writer(s)	Producer(s)	Length
13.	"Self Paid" (featuring Rox and Rick Ross)	Khaled; Roberts	Johnny Juliano	3:24
14.	"Rock N Roll (Remix)" (performed by Raekwon featuring DJ Khaled, Game, Pharrell and Busta Rhymes)	Khaled; Corey Woods; Taylor; Pharrell Williams; Smith; Abdul-Rahman	DJ Khalil	5:13
15.	"Bottles & Rockin' J's" (performed by Game featuring DJ Khaled, Busta Rhymes, Rick Ross, Fabolous and Lil Wayne)	Khaled; Taylor; Smith; Roberts; Jackson; Carter; Lewis	Lex Luger	5:39

Notes

- ^{^a} signifies a co-producer
- ^{^b} signifies an additional producer

Sample Credits

- "It Ain't Over Til It's Over" contains a sample of Life After Death's "B.I.G. Interlude" by The Notorious B.I.G. which samples "P.S.K. What Does It Mean?" by Schooly D.
- "Welcome To My Hood" contains a sample of "Sound of da Police" by KRS-One.

== Charts ==
=== Weekly charts ===
Weekly chart performance
Chart (2011)	Peak position
Canadian Albums (Nielsen SoundScan)	57
US Billboard 200	5
US Top R&B/Hip-Hop Albums (Billboard)	2
US Top Rap Albums (Billboard)	1

=== Year-end charts ===
Year-end chart performance
Chart (2011)	Position
US Top R&B/Hip-Hop Albums (Billboard)	54

== Certifications ==
Certifications
Region	Certification	Certified units/sales
United States (RIAA)	Gold	500,000^{‡}
^{‡} Sales+streaming figures based on certification alone.

== See also ==
- List of number-one rap albums of 2011 (U.S.)
