= Poor Thang =

2026 song by J. Cole

Song by J. Cole

from the album The Fall-Off
- Released: February 6, 2026
- Recorded: 2016–2026
- Genre: Hip-hop
- Length: 4:50
- Label: Dreamville; Interscope
- Songwriters: Jermaine Cole; Steve Bilodeau; Tyler Williams; Kelvin Wooten; Damon Coleman; Michael Holmes; Torence Hatch; Jeremy Allen; Marcus Roach; Walter Sigler; Phillip Hurtt
- Producers: Cole; T-Minus; Wu10; Omen; DZL

"Poor Thang" is a song by American rapper J. Cole, released on February 6, 2026 from his seventh studio album, The Fall-Off. It was produced by Cole himself, with additional production from T-Minus, Wu10, Omen and DZL. The song contains a sample of "Set It Off" by Boosie Badazz.

== Content ==
The song finds J. Cole rapping in an aggressive tone, as he disses a certain artist from his hometown. Cole criticizes his rival for the inauthenticity of their music, considering it disrespectful; in the third verse, he refers to them as a "punk bitch" at the end of every line.

== Critical reception ==
The song received generally positive reviews. Carl Lamarre of Billboard ranked it as the 15th best song from The Fall-Off, while Preezy Brown of Vibe ranked it as the album's best song, writing that "Cole steps to the mic with a measured yet aggressive delivery. His bars cut through soulful textures and vocal wails, balancing precision with intensity." Brown also described it as a "superior performance that underscores Cole’s hunger, clarity, and continued dominance under pressure." Alexander Cole of HotNewHipHop remarked "'Poor Thang' is just the fifth song on the album, but there is no denying that Cole is rapping with intensity on this album. Every song has beautiful and intricate production, which keeps you coming back for more. Meanwhile, the rapping is some of Cole's best, and there is no denying that there will be plenty of bars to go back and analyze. Cole has delivered what could be the final album of his career, and the fans are certainly intrigued." Clash's Robin Murray considered the song a highlight of The Fall-Off and called it "novelistic feast", while Pitchfork's Benny Sun commented "when he relinquishes some of his knottier ideas, he sounds genuinely excited to be rapping on 'Poor Thang'". Reviewing The Fall-Off for The Line of Best Fit, William Rosebury opined that "The most accomplished run on the album comes from 'Poor Thang' through to 'Drum n Bass'". Vernon Ayiku of Exclaim! believed the song "feels at odds with Cole's recent public retreat from confrontation. The performance is sharp, but the shift in tone undercuts the credibility of his personal evolution, and reads more as posturing than a genuine invitation to engage."

== Charts ==
Chart performance for "Poor Thang"
Chart (2026)	Peak position
Canada Hot 100 (Billboard)	47
Global 200 (Billboard)	61
Ireland (IRMA)	81
New Zealand Hot Singles (RMNZ)	5
Portugal (AFP)	187
South Africa Streaming (TOSAC)	8
US Billboard Hot 100	30
US Hot R&B/Hip-Hop Songs (Billboard)	10
