= Safety (song) =

2026 song by J. Cole

Song by J. Cole

from the album The Fall-Off
- Released: February 6, 2026
- Recorded: 2016–2026
- Genre: Hip-hop
- Length: 5:18
- Label: Dreamville; Interscope
- Songwriters: Jermaine Cole; Kelvin Wooten; Powers Pleasant; Tim Friedrich; Michael Holmes; Thomas Wlodarczyk; Dana Owens; Keir Gist; Melvin Dinkins; Joe Sample
- Producers: Cole; Wu10; Pleasant; Sucuki; DZL

"Safety" is a song by American rapper J. Cole, released on February 6, 2026 from his seventh studio album, The Fall-Off. It was produced by Cole himself, Wu10, Powers Pleasant, Sucuki and DZL. The song contains a sample of "U.N.I.T.Y." by Queen Latifah.

== Composition ==
The beat of the song samples the horns from "U.N.I.T.Y." Music critics have likened the nature of the song to that of "One Love" by Nas; in three verses, J. Cole raps from the perspectives of friends from his hometown of Fayetteville, North Carolina, who leave messages for him, complimenting his success as a rapper and updating him on neighborhood gossip.

The third verse centers on Cole's regret about his treatment of a queer friend, identified as "Quay". He begins by expressing his renewed appreciation for life, influenced by the deaths of many of his peers over the years, including Quay, whom he notes is believed to have died from AIDS. Cole recounts that Quay did not come out until he went to college at North Carolina A&T State University, was "runnin' with fruity types, dick-in-the-booty types", and later moved to Atlanta to seek a more accepting community. In addition, Cole confesses that he and his friends had ostracized him, with some of them even referring to him as a "faggot" (though Cole stops short of saying the word mid-sentence). He underlines his remorse, stating he wishes he could apologize to him.

== Critical reception ==
The song received generally positive reviews. Carl Lamarre of Billboard ranked it as the fifth best song from The Fall-Off, lauding J. Cole's storytelling and commenting "His ability to weave in and out of character is supremely underrated, as he morphs into different personas flawlessly throughout the album, most notably here on 'Safety.'" Preezy Brown of Vibe ranked it as the album's second best song, writing that its "honesty adds realism and depth, reminding listeners why his self-awareness and heart made us fall in love with his approach in the first place." Writing for HotNewHipHop, Alexander Cole described the song as a "five-minute epic with a gorgeous instrumental that gives Cole lots of room to showcase his talent", adding "Songs like 'Safety' have great rapping and some melodic parts, which just show how much versatility the artist has." Reviewing The Fall-Off for Clash, Robin Murray wrote "'Two Six' goes wild, followed by the neck-snapping 'SAFETY'. It's a high-octane opening gambit, fuelled by Cole's innate musicality." William Rosebury of The Line of Best Fit considered it a highlight of the album, stating "It's like an anxiety dream many can relate to, the sense you are letting people down but that life is moving too quickly."

Some critics responded negatively to the song's attempt to address discrimination against LGBTQ people. Paul Attard of Slant Magazine criticized the song for its "awkwardly explained-away homophobia" and opined it was "halfhearted, not-that-enlightened". Reviewing The Fall-Off for Pitchfork, Benny Sun stated that the album "offers some insane societal commentary that calls into question how many of his daily comings and goings involve actual people", remarking "The worst perpetrator of all, 'Safety,' tries to deliver a self-sanctified testimony of allyship with some violently distasteful storytelling." He further wrote that the song "feels like a roundabout apology for Cole's embarrassingly long history of transphobic and homophobic bars, but it's well-meaning in the clunkiest, shallowest way possible. His inability to recognize the oxymoron makes Cole's introspection on this topic feel less like a genuine reckoning and more like a feeble attempt at bleaching out the darkest stains of his career."

== Charts ==
Chart performance for "Safety"
Chart (2026)	Peak position
Canada Hot 100 (Billboard)	43
Global 200 (Billboard)	59
Ireland (IRMA)	66
New Zealand Hot Singles (RMNZ)	4
Portugal (AFP)	132
South Africa Streaming (TOSAC)	7
UK Singles (OCC)	51
US Billboard Hot 100	29
US Hot R&B/Hip-Hop Songs (Billboard)	9
