= Pricey =

2024 song by J. Cole and Ari Lennox featuring Young Dro and Gucci Mane

Song by J. Cole and Ari Lennox featuring Young Dro and Gucci Mane

from the album Might Delete Later
- Released: April 5, 2024
- Genre: Hip hop
- Length: 4:55
- Label: Dreamville; Interscope
- Songwriters: Jermaine Cole; Michael Holmes; Kelvin Wooten; Daoud Anthony; Sven Libaek; Morris Ricks; Davionne Starks
- Producers: J. Cole; T-Minus; DZL; WU10; Daoud

"Pricey" is a song by American rapper J. Cole and American singer Ari Lennox featuring American rappers Young Dro and Gucci Mane. It is the opening track from J. Cole's fourth mixtape Might Delete Later (2024). The song was produced by Cole himself, T-Minus, DZL, WU10 and Daoud.

== Critical reception ==
The song received generally mixed reviews from critics. Robin Murray of Clash described it as a "muscular soul of opener". Dakota West Foss of Sputnikmusic criticized the song in a review of Might Delete Later: "It's frankly shocking how unserious and indifferent Jermaine is throughout a dozen tracks, with bars and punchlines that scan like parody. One need not look further than the opener, 'Pricey', for Cole to proclaim he 'Climbed up out the trenches as a shorty with intentions/to switch my whip as much as Rick and Morty switch dimensions.' In the second verse, he once again comes through with his trademark empty promise of greatness, 'Breakin news, I've officially entered my prime/which is real interesting, this is the point where a rapper would typically start to decline.' This is after saying he's 'David Chapelle on his latest Netflix/Go 'head try to cancel my shit.' Save your eyerolls for when he meets his Farrakhan shoutout quota, lest they roll out of your skull. Please keep in mind this is only the first track." Paul A. Thompson of Pitchfork stated the song "is weighed down by an unnecessarily frilly interlude and equally strained references to John Gotti and Rick and Morty. But its drums sound like they're dragging themselves through quicksand, and Cole darts nimbly through them." Reviewing Might Delete Later for HotNewHipHop, Aron A. commented the song "sets the tone with a calming and cool effect that sounds like it should soundtrack an old-school Cadillac with gold plates riding through a deeply leafy and muddy forest, accented by Ari Lennox's decadent vocals and Young Dro's hypnotizing bridge over glossy bluesy guitar strings", but that Gucci Mane's spoken word passage which concludes the song "allow[s] Cole to push an uplifting message without sounding preachy."

== Charts ==
Chart performance for "Pricey"
Chart (2024)	Peak position
Canada Hot 100 (Billboard)	49
Global 200 (Billboard)	56
New Zealand Hot Singles (RMNZ)	5
South Africa (TOSAC)	9
US Billboard Hot 100	29
US Hot R&B/Hip-Hop Songs (Billboard)	13
