= The Fall-Off World Tour =

2026 concert tour by J. Cole

The Fall-Off Tour
- Tour by J. Cole
- Location: Africa; Europe; North America; Oceania
- Associated album: The Fall-Off
- Start date: 10 July 2026
- End date: 12 December 2026
- No. of shows: 73
- Website: www.thefalloff.com/tour

J. Cole concert chronology
- It's All a Blur Tour – Big as the What? (2024); The Fall-Off Tour (2026)

The Fall-Off World Tour is an ongoing concert tour by American rapper J. Cole. Announced on 16 February 2026, the tour began in Charlotte, North Carolina on 10 July, and will finish in Johannesburg, South Africa, on 12 December. The tour is in support of J. Cole's seventh studio album, The Fall-Off, released on 6 February 2026.

== Background ==
J. Cole officially announced The Fall-Off World Tour on 16 February 2026, following the release of his seventh studio album, The Fall Off. The album and tour title were first teased in 2018 on the KOD album track "1985 (Intro to 'The Fall Off')". This marks Cole’s first solo headlining arena run in five years and his first global tour since 2017. The announcement followed his "Trunk Sale Tour," a series of pop-up events where he sold physical CDs directly to fans from his car.

The tour spans over 50 dates across North America, Europe, Australia, and South Africa. The performance concept is heavily influenced by the album's dual-disc structure, which explores his life at ages 29 and 39 and his legacy in North Carolina.

== Setlist ==
1. 39 Intro
2. Two Six
3. SAFETY
4. Run A Train
5. Poor Thang
6. Legacy
7. A Tale Of 2 Citiez
8. Fire Squad
9. WHO TF IZ U
10. Old Dog
11. MIDDLE CHILD
12. a lot
13. Johnny P's Caddy
14. Lights Please
15. 2Face
16. In The Morning
17. Nobody's Perfect
18. Work Out
19. Can't Get Enough
20. The London
21. She Knows
22. The Let Out
23. Bombs in the Ville/Hit the Gas
24. Wet Dreamz
25. G.O.M.D
26. Life Sentence
27. Love Yourz
28. Power Trip
29. Planez
30. No Role Modelz
31. Quik Stop

== Tour dates ==
List of 2026 concerts
Date (2026)	City	Country	Venue
North America (45 Shows)
10 July	Charlotte	United States	Spectrum Center
11 July	Charlotte	United States	Spectrum Center
14 July	Miami	United States	Kaseya Center
15 July	Tampa	United States	Benchmark International Arena
17 July	Atlanta	United States	State Farm Arena
18 July	Atlanta	United States	State Farm Arena
20 July	Philadelphia	United States	Xfinity Mobile Arena
21 July	Philadelphia	United States	Xfinity Mobile Arena
23 July	Baltimore	United States	CFG Bank Arena
25 July	Montreal	Canada	Bell Centre
27 July	Toronto	Canada	Scotiabank Arena
28 July	Toronto	Canada	Scotiabank Arena
31 July	Brooklyn	United States	Barclays Center
1 August	Brooklyn	United States	Barclays Center
2 August	New York	United States	Madison Square Garden
4 August	New York	United States	Madison Square Garden
5 August	Queens	United States	UBS Arena
7 August	Boston	United States	TD Garden
8 August	Boston	United States	TD Garden
11 August	Chicago	United States	United Center
12 August	Chicago	United States	United Center
15 August	Cleveland	United States	Rocket Arena
16 August	Detroit	United States	Little Caesars Arena
18 August	Minneapolis	United States	Target Center
19 August	Kansas City	United States	T-Mobile Center
21 August	Denver	United States	Ball Arena
24 August	Vancouver	Canada	Rogers Arena
25 August	Seattle	United States	Climate Pledge Arena
27 August	Sacramento	United States	Golden 1 Center
29 August	Oakland	United States	Oakland Arena
30 August	Oakland	United States	Oakland Arena
1 September	Los Angeles	United States	Crypto.com Arena
3 September	Inglewood	United States	Intuit Dome
4 September	Inglewood	United States	Intuit Dome
6 September	Las Vegas	United States	T-Mobile Arena
7 September	Los Angeles	United States	Crypto.com Arena
9 September	San Diego	United States	Viejas Arena
10 September	Phoenix	United States	Mortgage Matchup Center
13 September	San Antonio	United States	Frost Bank Center
14 September	Austin	United States	Moody Center
16 September	Houston	United States	Toyota Center
17 September	Houston	United States	Toyota Center
19 September	Dallas	United States	American Airlines Center
20 September	Dallas	United States	American Airlines Center
23 September	Fayetteville	United States	Crown Coliseum
Europe (20 Shows)
7 October	Berlin	Germany	Uber Arena
9 October	Zurich	Switzerland	Hallenstadion
12 October	Amsterdam	Netherlands	Ziggo Dome
13 October	Amsterdam	Netherlands	Ziggo Dome
15 October	Cologne	Germany	Lanxess Arena
17 October	Antwerp	Belgium	AFAS Dome
19 October	London	England	The O2 Arena
20 October	London	England	The O2 Arena
22 October	Dublin	Ireland	3Arena
25 October	Birmingham	England	Utilita Arena
26 October	Glasgow	Scotland	OVO Hydro
28 October	Manchester	England	Co-op Live
29 October	Manchester	England	Co-op Live
31 October	Nottingham	England	Motorpoint Arena
2 November	London	England	The O2 Arena
5 November	Paris	France	Accor Arena
8 November	Hamburg	Germany	Barclays Arena
9 November	Copenhagen	Denmark	Royal Arena
11 November	Stockholm	Sweden	Avicii Arena
12 November	Oslo	Norway	Unity Arena
Oceania (7 Shows)
25 November	Brisbane	Australia	Brisbane Entertainment Centre
28 November	Melbourne	Australia	Rod Laver Arena
29 November	Melbourne	Australia	Rod Laver Arena
1 December	Sydney	Australia	Afterpay Arena
2 December	Sydney	Australia	Afterpay Arena
5 December	Auckland	New Zealand	Spark Arena
6 December	Auckland	New Zealand	Spark Arena
Africa (1 Show)
12 December	Johannesburg	South Africa	FNB Stadium
