= Champion (Nicki Minaj song) =

2012 song by Nicki Minaj

Song by Nicki Minaj featuring Drake, Nas, Young Jeezy

from the album Pink Friday: Roman Reloaded
- Released: April 3, 2012
- Recorded: March 2012
- Studio: Conway Studios (Los Angeles) and Jungle City Studios (New York City)
- Genre: Downtempo; hardcore hip-hop
- Length: 4:56
- Label: Young Money; Cash Money; Universal Republic
- Songwriters: Onika Maraj; Tyler Williams; Nikhil Seetharam; Aubrey Graham; Jay Jenkins; Nasir Jones
- Producers: T-Minus; Nikhil Seetharam

Audio video
- "Champion" on YouTube

"Champion" is a song by rapper Nicki Minaj featuring Drake, Nas, and Young Jeezy, taken from her second album, Pink Friday: Roman Reloaded (2012). "Champion" was written by its performers—Minaj, Aubrey Graham, Jay Jenkins, and Nasir Jones—while the production and additional writing was handled by Pink Friday (2010) collaborators T-Minus and Nikhil Seetharam. Musically, "Champion" is a downtempo hardcore hip hop ballad that also incorporates elements of R&B, new-age, and space music. The lyrics speak of each artist's rise to fame, as well as the trials and tribulations that it carries; it references the death of Minaj's cousin, Nicholas Telemaque, who was murdered near his Brooklyn home on July 3, 2011.

"Champion" garnered praise from music critics, with the majority declaring it a stand-out track. The song is notable for the return of Minaj's original low-key sound, as well as her tame "gimmick-free" delivery as opposed to her eccentric "Roman" songs. Critics generally praised the song for its serious tone and introspective nature. Minaj performed the song live for the first time on 106 & Park on April 3, 2012, along with "Beez in the Trap", and "Roman Reloaded".

== Production ==
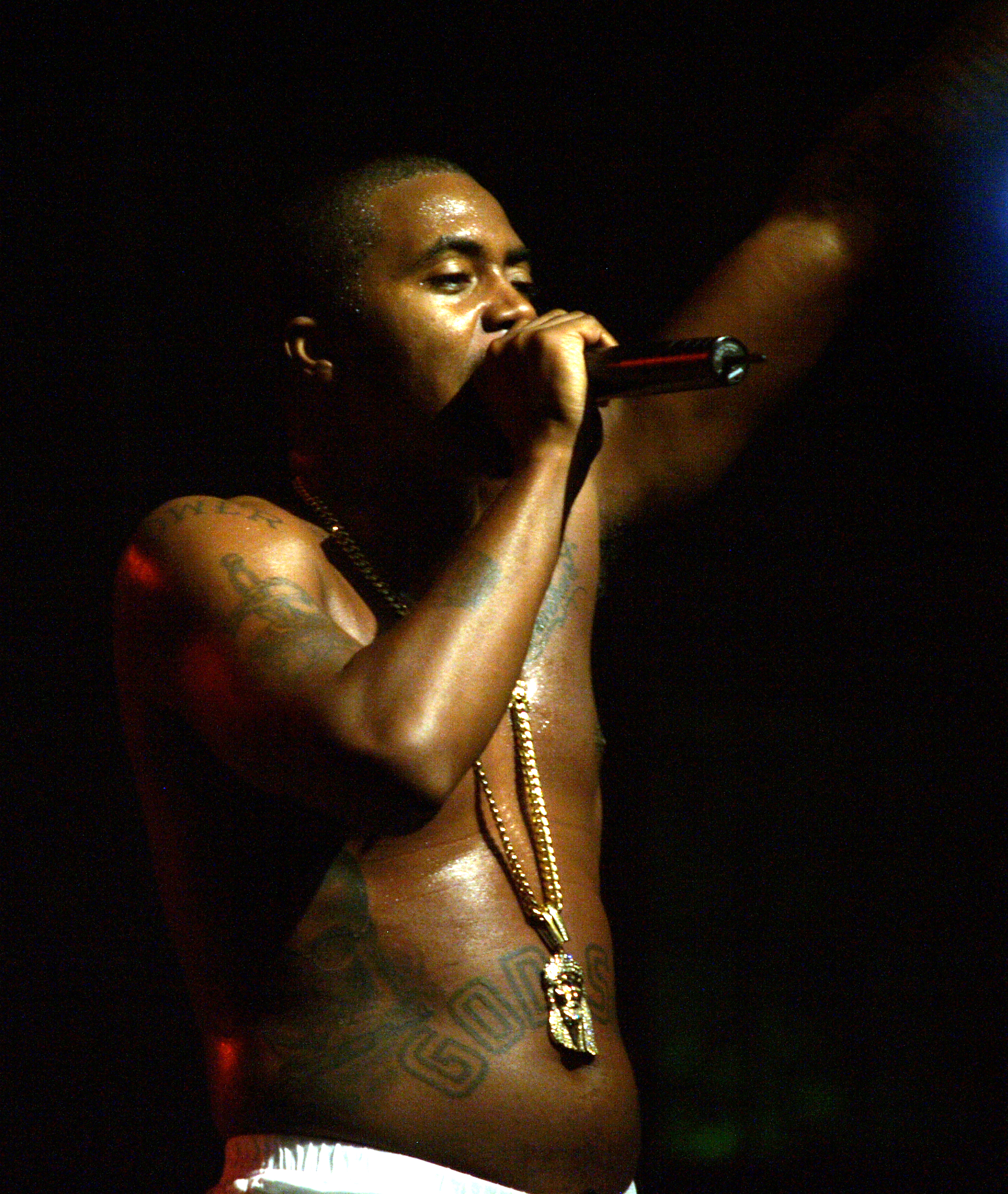
Minaj recruited rapper Nas (pictured) for "Champion".

"Champion" was written by Minaj, along with T-Minus, Nikhil S., Drake, Young Jeezy, and Nas, with production handled by T-Minus and Nikhil S., who had previously worked with Minaj on her debut studio album Pink Friday (2010). Minaj had wanted several artists to appear on the song, including fellow New York rapper Nas. She had stated that she did not think that she could get Nas on the song, saying "He's always been so exclusive. He doesn't work with everybody and I respect people that are like that. They take pride in their craft." Minaj told Vibe, "I keep saying to be from Queens and to end up having him... We know how picky he is [for features]. He said 'I like the song, I'm a do it, you can wait 'til Monday and I got you' and he kept his word. He murked it, for me to wait for a feature and it be that and murk the song and finish the song that way... I was amazed." After hearing the song, Nas agreed to be on the track, and sent his verse back to Minaj the following Monday. After collaborating, Nas said that he had fallen in love with the song: "Nicki hit us up, I got love, so it was nothin'--I did the record....If I feel it, I can get on it. I heard the track. I felt it. I loved it." Another artist Minaj wanted on "Champion" was long-time idol and fellow female rapper Lauryn Hill. "I wanted to get her on 'Champion'... That would have been crazy, right? She was my fave. [...] Lauryn to me is the goddess. I'd love to meet her. I'm pretty sure she's heard me talk about her a billion times." Although Minaj vouched for Hill to appear on the track, plans were never finalized and the collaboration ultimately fell through.

Recording of "Champion" took place at Conway Studios, in Los Angeles, California, as well as Jungle City Studios in New York City, New York. Mixing was handled by Jon Sher and Noel Cadastre at Conway Studios. Minaj was unsure if he would accept her offer to be featured on "Champion", but after sending him the song, Nas replied back with his verse via e-mail. On March 28, 2012, "Champion" leaked onto the internet six days ahead of its official release. In the following hours after the leak of "Champion", the contents of the entire album were leaked online. On May 24, 2012, a poll was posted on Minaj's official website asking fans to choose the next single(s). The poll was divided into three categories. The second category prompted fans to choose between "Champion", "HOV Lane", and "I Am Your Leader". "Champion" had the most votes and won the poll. "HOV Lane" came in second place and "I Am Your Leader" came in third.

== Composition ==
Nicki Minaj – "Champion"
A 29-second sample of the song's chorus, which features Minaj both rapping and singing.

"Champion" is a relatively slow-paced, retrospective downtempo ballad that draws heavily from hardcore hip hop. It is also influenced by other genres, such as R&B, new-age, and space music. The "anthemic" and "inspiring" song features a low-key, woozy, and snaky production, accompanied by prominent military-style drums, heavy synths, and rough, hard strewn beats. "Champion" has been described as one of the few songs that Minaj's delivery is "calm and collected" as opposed to her eccentric "Roman" tracks. The rise to fame, the trials and tribulations that ensue, and celebration are prominent themes that are discussed in the lyrics. Minaj also makes reference to her deceased cousin, Nicholas Telemaque, who was shot and killed near his Brooklyn home on July 3, 2011, in the line "'Cause they killed my little cousin, Nicholas/ But my memories only have happy images." Multiple critics felt the lyrical content of "Champion" was the most sincere on the album. Lewis Corner of Digital Spy called them "genuinely heartbreaking", and Alex Macpherson of Fact described them as "undeniably moving".

== Critical reception ==
"Champion" garnered praise from critics, and was hailed as an album highlight by some of them. Andrew Hampp of Billboard gave the track a positive review, stating Minaj "Sheds light in her journey from struggle to success." While reviewing the album, Jody Rosen of Rolling Stone declared the song "beamingly triumphant". Global Grind reviewer Brittany Lewis gave the song a very positive review, saying :"This retrospective track explores Nicki's more serious side and details the trials and tribulations of Nicki's now solidified success", and later went on to say that "Champion" will make the listener evaluate their own life. Both the reviewer from The Washington Post and Mesfin Fekadu of the San Francisco Chronicle gave the song a positive review, calling it "top-notch". Adam Graham of The Detroit News said the song would please fans of early Minaj, while going on to praise her rap-heavy delivery. Trent Fitzgerald of Popcrush was positive towards "Champion", calling it the "biggest" song on the album, as well as a noting its potential commercial success. "Champion" was labeled as the most impressive hardcore hip hop song on the album, as well as being "anthemic" by Andy Gill of The Independent. In his review of Pink Friday: Roman Reloaded, 'Nathan S of DJ Booth said: "It has to be said that 'Champion', featuring an excellent Nas verse, is one of Nicki's most engaging tracks in memory, precisely because she drops the posturing and fame-hunting. It's proof that behind all the acting is a legitimately talented artist." Although, not all reviews were positive. Matthew Cole of Slant Magazine criticized the vocalist's performance of the verses, claiming they were "incapable". Randall Roberts of the Los Angeles Times gave the song a mixed review, highlighting Nas' verse, while mildly criticizing Minaj's. Entertainment Weekly named it one of the best songs on the album along with "I Am Your Leader". XXL Magazine stated that "Though many of the early songs [on the album] lack real substance, the records remain generally exciting - 'I Am Your Leader', alongside Rick Ross and Cam'ron, 'Beez in the Trap' with 2 Chainz, and the triumphant 'Champion' featuring Nas, Drake and Young Jeezy are all memorable moments."

== Live performances ==
Minaj performed "Champion" for the first time on 106 & Park on April 3, 2012, along with "Roman Reloaded", "HOV Lane", "I Am Your Leader", "Beez in the Trap", "Right by My Side" and "Fire Burns". She performed "Champion" alongside "Beez in the Trap" with 2 Chainz at the 2012 BET Awards. The rapper also performed "Champion" on the Australian and Asian legs of her Pink Friday Tour.

== Credits and personnel ==
Recording

- Recorded at Conway Studios, Los Angeles, California; Jungle City Studios, New York City, New York

Personnel

- Songwriting – Onika Maraj, Tyler Williams, Nikhil Seetharam, Aubrey Graham, Jay Jenkins, Nasir Jones.
- Production – T-Minus, Nikhil S.
- Mixed at – Conway Studios, Los Angeles CA
- Recording – Ariel Chobaz, Noah "40" Shebib, Stuart White
- Recording assistant – Jon Sher, Noel Cadastre
- Mixing – Ariel Chobaz, Jon Sher

Credits adapted from Pink Friday: Roman Reloaded album liner notes.

== Chart positions ==
Chart (2012)	Peak position
US R&B/Hip-Hop Digital Songs (Billboard)	36
