= Port Antonio (song) =

Single by J. Cole
- Released: October 10, 2024
- Recorded: 2024
- Genre: Hip-hop
- Length: 5:16
- Label: Roc Nation; Columbia; Dreamville
- Songwriter: J. Cole
- Producers: DZL; Omen; J. Cole

J. Cole singles chronology
"Blow for Blow" (2024)	"Port Antonio" (2024)	"Clouds" (2025)

Music video
- Port Antonio on YouTube

"Port Antonio" is a song by American rapper J. Cole. Initially released on Instagram exclusively on October 10, 2024, it was later officially distributed throughout streaming services on February 21, 2025. The song was produced by DZL, Omen and J. Cole, sampling a live version of Cleo Sol's song "Know That You Are Loved" and "A Garden of Peace" by Lonnie Liston Smith.

== Background and lyrics ==
Within the 2024 escalation of the Drake–Kendrick Lamar feud, Cole released "7 Minute Drill" as a response to "Like That" by Kendrick Lamar, Future, and Metro Boomin. Two days later, he publicly apologized for the song and took it down on streaming services to resign out of the feud. In "Port Antonio," the first track he released about the feud after "7 Minute Drill," he notably looks back at the conflict and clarifies his apology and respect for both of the rappers.

The song also discusses about his experiences growing up in Fayetteville, North Carolina, what he calls "the Ville," as well as problems with the competition of the music industry such as botting streams.
