= Crocodile Tearz =

2024 song by J. Cole

Song by J. Cole

from the album Might Delete Later
- Released: April 5, 2024
- Genre: Hip hop
- Length: 3:49
- Label: Dreamville; Interscope
- Songwriters: Jermaine Cole; Tyler Williams
- Producer: T-Minus

"Crocodile Tearz" is a song by American rapper J. Cole from his fourth mixtape Might Delete Later (2024).

== Background ==
J. Cole previewed the song in a social media vlog titled "Might Delete Later, Vol. 1" on February 21, 2024.

== Composition and lyrics ==
"Crocodile Tearz" utilizes an "eerie Memphis-leaning beat" that has been described as reminiscent of the song "Knife Talk" by Drake featuring 21 Savage, as well as "mournful sonics" while J. Cole uses a direct tone in his lyrics, in which he emphasizes his status as among the best rappers in the modern hip-hop world. In addition, he takes subliminal shots at Future: "Yes, sir, it's me, not two, not three / The uno, G-O-A-T, I need my fee, fuck kudos / G4 at least, these flights ain't cheap as you know / They sound faded, they downgraded, they Pluto / I'm bigger than Mars, this nigga a star, I'm Bruno". Cole would nevertheless, go on to collaborate with Future and Metro Boomin's on their collaboration album, We Still Don't Trust You, featuring on the eighteenth track "Red Leather".

== Critical reception ==
Paul A. Thompson of Pitchfork praised J. Cole's performance, describing him as "rapping through his teeth in a way that makes him sound more composed and more menacing than nearly ever before". Aron A. of HotNewHipHop stated that "Might Delete Later isn't a body of work that aims to do much else besides wreak lyrical tyranny on the rest of hip-hop and make it clear where he stands among the crowd", before writing "It's best summarized on 'Crocodile Tearz,' a fiery banger that's filled a cut-throat performance from Cole".

== Charts ==
Chart performance for "Crocodile Tearz"
| Chart (2024) | Peak position |
|---|---|
| Australia (ARIA) | 71 |
| Canada Hot 100 (Billboard) | 29 |
| Global 200 (Billboard) | 31 |
| Greece International (IFPI) | 55 |
| Ireland (IRMA) | 64 |
| New Zealand Hot Singles (RMNZ) | 4 |
| South Africa (TOSAC) | 7 |
| UK Singles (OCC) | 53 |
| UK Hip Hop/R&B (OCC) | 19 |
| US Billboard Hot 100 | 19 |
| US Hot R&B/Hip-Hop Songs (Billboard) | 9 |
