= Huntin' Wabbitz =

2024 song by J. Cole

Song by J. Cole

from the album Might Delete Later
- Released: April 5, 2024
- Genre: Hip hop
- Length: 2:42
- Label: Dreamville; Interscope
- Songwriters: Jermaine Cole; Tyler Williams; Ernest Brown; Ibrahim Hamad
- Producers: T-Minus; Charlie Heat; Hamad

"Huntin' Wabbitz" is a song by American rapper J. Cole from his fourth mixtape Might Delete Later (2024). It was produced by T-Minus, Charlie Heat and Ibrahim Hamad and contains samples from "Wabbit Season" by YouTube animator MeatCanyon.

== Critical reception ==
Robin Murray of Clash described the song as "cartoonish". Paul A. Thompson of Pitchfork criticized the song for the reason that "By the middle of 'Huntin' Wabbitz,' his flow has settled into a sleepy seesaw, and his boasts about being 'too locked in' don't read quite the way they're intended." Aron A. of HotNewHipHop reacted more favorably to the song, mentioning it as one of the tracks from Might Delete Later which "further fortify Cole's M.O. across this album of being an elite MC".

== Charts ==
Chart performance for "Huntin' Wabbitz"
Chart (2024)	Peak position
Canada Hot 100 (Billboard)	45
Global 200 (Billboard)	55
South Africa (TOSAC)	12
US Billboard Hot 100	28
US Hot R&B/Hip-Hop Songs (Billboard)	12
