= Birthday Blizzard '26 =

EP by J. Cole
- Released: January 27, 2026
- Genre: Hip-hop
- Length: 11:33
- Label: Self-released

J. Cole chronology
Might Delete Later (2024)	Birthday Blizzard '26 (2026)	The Fall-Off (2026)

Birthday Blizzard '26 is a release by American rapper J. Cole, hosted by DJ Clue and described by publications as either an extended play or a mixtape. It was self-released on January 27, 2026, exclusively on his "The Fall-Off" website, a day before his forty-first birthday, for a minimum purchase of $1. The album only consisted of four song freestyles set to classic 1990's East Coast hip-hop songs.

== Background ==
On January 14, 2026, Cole released a trailer for his seventh and final studio album, The Fall-Off and announced it would be released on February 6, 2026. The same day, he released the single "Disc 2 Track 2", implying that The Fall-Off would be a double album.

On January 20, 2026, rapper Jadakiss teased that Cole would be releasing a project before The Fall-Off, which would feature him freestyling on instrumentals of songs like "Can I Live" and "Money, Power & Respect". On January 27, 2026, before the EP's release, fans began to speculate on social media after an unlistenable version of the EP appeared on the internet via message boards and social media, before being pulled down shortly after.

== Track listing ==
Birthday Blizzard '26 track listing
No.	Title	Original beat	Length
1.	"Bronx Zoo Freestyle"	"Victory" (Puff Daddy featuring the Notorious B.I.G. and Busta Rhymes)	3:04
2.	"Golden Goose Freestyle"	"Can I Live" (Black Rob and the Lox)	2:19
3.	"Winter Storm Freestyle"	"Who Shot Ya?" (The Notorious B.I.G.)	2:17
4.	"99 Build Freestyle"	"Money, Power & Respect" (The Lox featuring DMX and Lil' Kim)	3:51
Total length:			11:33

== Release history ==
Release history
Date	Format(s)	Ref.
January 27, 2026	Download	
July 8, 2026	Streaming	
