= Ecstasy, Passion & Pain =

1970s disco band

- Also known as: Ecstasy, Passion & Pain feat. Barbara Roy
- Origin: New York City, United States
- Genres: Disco
- Years active: 1972–1977
- Labels: Roulette Records
- Members: Barbara Roy (vocals/guitar); Joseph Williams Jr. (bass); Alan Tiza (percussion); Althea Smith (drums); Billy Gardner (keyboard); Jimmy Clark (guitar); Ronald Foster (keyboard)
- Past members: Carl Jordan (percussion); Ray Brown (keyboard); Fred Wells (guitar); Lorenzo (Tony) Wyche (trumpet); Tony Thompson (drums); Raymond Jones (keyboard)

Ecstasy, Passion & Pain (often abbreviated EP&P or E.P.&P.) was a 1970s disco band. Their most successful songs are "Touch and Go" and "Ask Me".

== History ==
EP&P was founded by Barbara Roy in New York in 1972. Roy was the only fixed member of the group for as long as they existed and responsible for writing most of the group's songs as well as taking care of finances and business. The group was disbanded in 1977 after the release of "Passion" and "Dance the Night Away" failed to match the success on "Touch and Go".

== Releases ==
Their single, "One Beautiful Day", written by Melvin and Mervin Steals, peaked at number 48 on the Billboard Hot 100 in 1975.

Their single, "Good Things Don't Last Forever", charted at #93 of the Billboard Hot 100 in 1974 while reaching #14 in the Billboard Hot Soul Singles chart.

Later in 1974, their single, "Ask Me" spent two weeks at number two on the American dance charts. The song also hit number nineteen on the soul charts and number fifty-two on the Hot 100.

Their single, "Touch and Go", was the group's first release to feature lead singer, Barbara Roy's name on the label. It peaked at number four on the Billboard Dance chart, crossing over to both the soul and pop charts. "Touch and Go" peaked at number seventy-one on the soul singles chart and number ninety-eight on the Hot 100.

== Discography ==
=== Studio albums ===
Year	Title	Peak	Record label
Year	Title	US R&B	Record label
1974	Ecstasy, Passion & Pain	38	Roulette

=== Compilation albums ===
- Good Things: The Roulette Recordings 1973-1977 (1999, Westside)

=== Singles ===
Year	Title	Peak chart positions			
Year	Title	US	US R&B	US Dan	CAN
1974	"I Wouldn't Give You Up"	102	17	—	—
1974	"Good Things Don't Last Forever"	93	14	—	—
1974	"Ask Me"	52	19	2	—
1975	"One Beautiful Day"	48	14	14	69
1975	"There's So Much Love Around Me"	—	—	—	—
1976	"Touch and Go"	98	71	4	—
1977	"Passion"	—	99	—	—
1977	"Dance the Night Away"	—	—	—	—
1981	"If You Want Me"	—	—	3	—
"—" denotes a recording that did not chart or was not released in that territory.
