= Barbara Roy =

American singer

Barbara Roy was born in Kinston, North Carolina and is a dance music singer famed for her beautiful and powerful voice as well as her exquisite enunciation. She scored several big hits on the Billboard Hot Dance Music/Club Play chart during the 1970s as the lead vocalist for Ecstasy, Passion & Pain, then went on to have more success as a solo artist.

In 1986, Roy hit number one on the dance chart with "Gotta See You Tonight". It had a two-week run at the top of the chart, while also charting on the Hot Black Singles chart, peaking at number eighty-three.

Barbara Roy is a devout Christian and has extended her professional name to Barbara Roy Gaskins. Based in Washington DC, Barbara now performs contemporary gospel music and released a new album, "Climbing", in 2002.

== See also ==
- List of number-one dance hits (United States)
- List of artists who reached number one on the US Dance chart
