= H.Y.B. (song) =

2024 song by J. Cole, Bas, and Central Cee

Single by J. Cole, Bas, and Central Cee

from the album Might Delete Later
- Released: April 30, 2024
- Genre: Hip hop; drill
- Length: 3:54
- Label: Dreamville; Interscope
- Songwriters: Jermaine Cole; Abbas Hamad; Oakley Caesar-Su; Abdul Aziz Dieng; Michael Mulé; Isaac De Boni
- Producers: DZL; AzizTheShake; FnZ

J. Cole singles chronology
"First Person Shooter" (2023)	"H.Y.B." (2024)	"Grippy" (2024)

Bas singles chronology
"179 Deli" (2023)	"H.Y.B." (2024)

Central Cee singles chronology
"I Will" (2024)	"H.Y.B." (2024)	"Band4Band" (2024)

"H.Y.B." (an acronym for "Hide Your Bitch") is a song by American rappers J. Cole and Bas and British rapper Central Cee. It was sent to US rhythmic radio through Dreamville (under the business name Cole World, Inc.) and Interscope Records as the lead and only single from Cole's fourth mixtape, Might Delete Later, on April 30, 2024. The song was produced by DZL, AzizTheShake and FnZ.

== Critical reception ==
"H.Y.B." received generally positive reviews from music critics. Robin Murray of Clash remarked that Central Cee's "showstealing appearance on 'H.Y.B.' is a new high water mark for the West London talent, a sign of his blossoming reputation in North America." Paul A. Thompson of Pitchfork described the song as "an exceedingly rare thing, a subtle integration of drill's wobble into a less industrial sound palette." Reviewing Might Delete Later for HotNewHipHop, Aron A. wrote that the tracks "H.Y.B" and "Stealth Mode" are "prime examples of Cole's ability to find inspiration from the new generation, even outside of the U.S. Bas, who appears on both tracks, pulls J Cole into a hedonistic lifestyle on both tracks that extends the themes of songs like 'Passport Bros.' Central Cee's inclusion on 'H.Y.B' is another heavyweight co-sign for the Brit."

Dakota West Foss of Sputnikmusic was critical of the song and stated it shows Drake's influence on J. Cole in a negative manner, writing it "finds Cole borrowing Aubrey's penchant of culture vulturing to briefly pretend that he's Bri'ish, roight with a bonafide drill song. He says the quiet part out loud when he says 'I keep forgetting I'm J Cole.' Bas and Central Cee make an appearance to lend credibility but I can't tell you if that worked or not because I am frankly too awestruck by Jermaine delivering a strong contender for worst bar of all time:

A-B-C-D-E-F-G-H-I-J-K-M-N-O-P/that's little me in the classroom askin', "what's L?"

Candidly, I have no idea what to say about that."

== Charts ==
Chart performance for "H.Y.B."
Chart (2024)	Peak position
Australia (ARIA)	73
Canada Hot 100 (Billboard)	34
Global 200 (Billboard)	47
Greece International (IFPI)	46
Ireland (IRMA)	45
New Zealand (Recorded Music NZ)	36
South Africa (TOSAC)	10
UK Singles (OCC)	29
UK Hip Hop/R&B (OCC)	7
US Billboard Hot 100	35
US Hot R&B/Hip-Hop Songs (Billboard)	17
US Rhythmic Airplay (Billboard)	26
