= Bunce Road Blues =

2026 song by J. Cole, Future and Tems

Song by J. Cole, Future and Tems

from the album The Fall-Off
- Released: February 6, 2026
- Recorded: 2016–2026
- Length: 5:10
- Label: Dreamville; Interscope
- Songwriters: Jermaine Cole; Nayvadius Wilburn; Temilade Openiyi; Abbas Hamad; Bryan Sledge; Margaux Whitney; Ron Gilmore Jr.; Alan Maman; Usher Raymond; Brian Casey; Jermaine Mauldin; Manuel Seal
- Producer: The Alchemist

"Bunce Road Blues" is a song by American rappers J. Cole and Future and Nigerian singer Tems, from Cole's seventh studio album, The Fall-Off (2026). Produced by The Alchemist, it features jazzy production. Future also interpolates "Nice & Slow" by Usher.

== Critical reception ==
The song received generally positive reviews. Billboard's Carl Lamarre ranked it as the sixth best song from The Fall-Off and wrote "The gumbo reaches its boil when a soulful Tems arrives at the tail end, bringing the mega-collaboration full circle." Alexander Cole of HotNewHipHop called it a "spectacular collaboration", remarking "'Bunce Road Blues' just sounds fantastic, too. Everyone is putting their best foot forward on this one. Cole and Future deliver some dope bars, while Tems soars over The Alchemist's production. Truly, a one-of-a-kind song on an album that is living up to the hype." Clash's Robin Murray considered it a highlight of The Fall-Off and stated "Tems' voice lights up 'Bunce Road Blues' like a warning signal." Regarding the song, Mosi Reeves of Rolling Stone commented that "Tems closes that number with a nice vocal." William Rosebury of The Line of Best Fit regarded it as within the "most accomplished run on the album", praising its "pure composition". Reviewing the album for Pitchfork, Benny Sun responded negatively to the track, describing it as one of the songs that "approach five minutes with no distinct direction" and the beat as "milquetoast".

== Charts ==
Chart performance for "Bunce Road Blues"
Chart (2026)	Peak position
Canada Hot 100 (Billboard)	55
Global 200 (Billboard)	75
Nigeria (TurnTable Top 100)	69
Portugal (AFP)	164
South Africa Streaming (TOSAC)	10
UK Singles (OCC)	59
US Billboard Hot 100	34
US Hot R&B/Hip-Hop Songs (Billboard)	13
