= Scott Cossu =

American new-age pianist

Scott Cossu is an American new-age pianist. He released a large number of albums on Windham Hill between 1980 and 1992, some to considerable sales success: 1987's She Describes Infinity reached number 24 on the U.S. Billboard Top Contemporary Jazz Albums chart, and 1989's Switchback reached number 12 on the Top New Age Albums chart.

Cossu suffered life-threatening head injuries after being struck by traffic in September 1989, while walking to a meeting in Century City. He made a full recovery.

He lives in Olympia, Washington.

== Discography ==
- Still Moments (Windham Hill, 1980)
- Spirals (Music is Medicine, 1981)
- Wind Dance (Windham Hill, 1981)
- Spirals (1983)
- Islands (Windham Hill, 1984)
- Reunion (Windham Hill, 1986)
- She Describes Infinity (Windham Hill, 1987)
- Switchback (Windham Hil, 1989)
- Mountain (Peter Roberts, 1991)
- Stained Glass Memories (Windham Hill, 1992)
- Retrospective (Windham Hill, 1992)
- When Spirits Fly (Miramar, 1998)
- Emerald Pathway (Alula, 2002)
- When Spirits Fly...Again (Alula, 2004)
- Tides Between Us (Silver Crow, 2007)
- Jazz, Boogie & Déjá Blues (Summit, 2012)
- Safe in Your Arms (Heart Dance, 2015)
- Memories of Water and Light (Heart Dance, 2020)
