= Might Delete Later =

Mixtape by J. Cole
- Released: April 5, 2024
- Genre: Hip-hop
- Length: 43:10
- Label: Dreamville; Interscope
- Producer: Al Hug; ATL Jacob; AzizTheShake; Cedric Brown; Charlie Heat; Conductor Williams; Daoud; Daylyt; DZL; Elyas; FnZ; Ibrahim Hamad; J. Cole; Kujibeats; Pluss; Steve Bilodeau; T-Minus; The Alchemist; WU10

J. Cole chronology
The Off-Season (2021)	Might Delete Later (2024)	Birthday Blizzard '26 (2026)

Singles from Might Delete Later
- 1. "H.Y.B." Released: April 30, 2024

Might Delete Later is the debut commercial mixtape and fourth overall by the American rapper J. Cole. It was released through Dreamville and Interscope Records on April 5, 2024. The mixtape features guest appearances from Young Dro, Gucci Mane, Ari Lennox, Cam'ron, Central Cee, Bas, Daylyt, and Ab-Soul. Included in the mixtape's production credits are Cole himself, T-Minus, Charlie Heat, FnZ, ATL Jacob, The Alchemist, Mike Will Made It, and Pluss, among others. The mixtape was supported by one single, "H.Y.B.", a collaboration with Bas and Central Cee that was sent to US rhythmic radio on April 30, 2024, weeks after the mixtape's release. Might Delete Later was J. Cole's first project not to be released under the Roc Nation imprint, and his first mixtape since Friday Night Lights, which was released in 2010. It was nominated for Best Rap Album at the 67th Annual Grammy Awards.

== Background ==
Might Delete Later's release had been hinted at through vlogs published by Cole in the weeks leading up to its release. While promoting his upcoming studio album, The Fall Off, on February 21, 2024, J. Cole shared a video titled "Might Delete Later, Vol. 1" that included a snippet of "Crocodile Tearz". Just under a month later, on March 18, J. Cole shared 'Vol. 2" of the vlog, which included a snippet of "3001".

On March 22, 2024, Future and Metro Boomin released their collaborative studio album, We Don't Trust You. The album's sixth track, "Like That", included a verse where featured artist Kendrick Lamar dissed J. Cole and Drake in reference to their collaborative track "First Person Shooter" that had been released the year prior. J. Cole responded to Lamar's diss on Might Delete Later with "7 Minute Drill", a track Cole later deleted from streaming services after. J. Cole later explained why he deleted the track about Lamar at Dreamville Festival 2024. Lamar and Drake would go on to engage in a rap feud throughout the following weeks.

== Controversy ==
Following the release of the mixtape, Cole faced backlash from fans and reporters after allegedly making what were perceived to be transphobic comments on the project's eighth track, "Pi". Some fans perceived the lyrics to be a reference to Kendrick Lamar's "Auntie Diaries", a song where Lamar addresses transphobia and his relationship with his transgender relatives.

== Critical reception ==
Professional ratings
Review scores
Source	Rating
Clash	8/10
Pitchfork	5.1/10
Sputnikmusic	0.5/5

Might Delete Later was largely met with mixed critical reception upon release. Writing a positive review for Clash, Robin Murray described how the mixtape's tracks, excluding "7 Minute Drill", feel like "exhilarating dip[s] into some of J. Cole's core tropes". He wrote that the production on the mixtape is "slightly out-of-step with the tape as a whole", but he noted that the production feels more "ingrained" in comparison to Future and Metro Boomin's We Don't Trust You. In a middling review for Pitchfork, Paul A. Thompson wrote that despite "plenty of compelling... rhythmic, textural, and even personal elements" on Might Delete Later, the mixtape's repeated declarations of greatness and demands for recognition are ultimately "rendered vacant and vaguely sad" after Cole's removal of "7 Minute Drill" from the project. Writing a negative review for Sputnikmusic, Dakota West Foss wrote that the mixtape's "bars and punchlines" are those "that scan like [a] parody", saying that Might Delete Later "is a miscalculation at every level" and comparing the project to Chance the Rapper's underwhelming studio album The Big Day. In a play on the project's title, Foss' final consensus was that Cole "should delete [it] now".

== Commercial performance ==
In the United States, Might Delete Later debuted at number two on the Billboard 200 with 115,000 album-equivalent units, which included 137.95 million on-demand streams and 9,000 pure album sales. This earned J. Cole his eighth top-ten entry on the chart, and his first project to not debut at number one since Born Sinner in 2013, which would later end up reaching the top of the chart.

== Track listing ==
Might Delete Later track listing
No.	Title	Writer(s)	Producer(s)	Length
1.	"Pricey" (with Ari Lennox featuring Young Dro and Gucci Mane)	Jermaine Cole; Sven Libaek; Morris Ricks; Davionne Starks; Michael Holmes; Kelvin Wooten; Daoud Anthony	J. Cole; T-Minus; DZL; Wu10; Daoud	4:55
2.	"Crocodile Tearz"	Cole; T. Williams	T-Minus	3:49
3.	"Ready '24" (featuring Cam'ron)	Cole; Cameron Giles; T. Williams; Holmes; Wooten; Abdul Aziz Dieng	T-Minus; DZL; Wu10; AzizTheShake	3:30
4.	"Huntin' Wabbitz"	Cole; T. Williams; Ernest Brown; Ibrahim Hamad	T-Minus; Charlie Heat; I. Hamad	2:42
5.	"H.Y.B." (featuring Bas and Central Cee)	Cole; Abbas Hamad; Oakley Caesar-Su; Holmes; Dieng; Michael Mulé; Isaac De Boni	DZL; AzizTheShake; FnZ	3:54
6.	"Fever"	Cole; Jacob Canady; Ofer Ishai	ATL Jacob; Kujibeats	2:23
7.	"Stickz n Stonez"	Cole; Alan Maman; Steve Bilodeau	The Alchemist; Bilodeau	3:21
8.	"Pi" (featuring Daylyt and Ab-Soul)	Cole; Davone Campbell; Herbert Stevens IV	Daylyt	5:55
9.	"Stealth Mode" (with Bas)	Cole; A. Hamad; Holmes; Dieng; Anthony	DZL; AzizTheShake; Daoud	2:15
10.	"3001"	Cole; T. Williams; Michael Williams II; Asheton Hogan	T-Minus; Mike Will Made It; Pluss	2:38
11.	"Trae the Truth in Ibiza"	Cole; Frazier Thompson III; Holmes; Anthony	DZL; Daoud	4:15
12.	"7 Minute Drill"	Cole; T. Williams; Denzel Williams; Hug Alessandro; Elias Sticken	T-Minus; Conductor Williams; Al Hug; Elyas	3:32
Total length:				43:10

Notes

- "Huntin' Wabbitz" contains samples from "Wabbit Season" by YouTube animator MeatCanyon.
- "Trae the Truth in Ibiza" features vocals by Trae tha Truth.
- "7 Minute Drill" was retired from streaming services on April 12, 2024; technically, it is disabled from playing (e.g. on Deezer) or hidden.

== Personnel ==
- J. Cole – vocals
- Joe LaPorta – mastering
- Juro "Mez" Davis – mixing
- Kuldeep Chudasama – engineering

== Charts ==
=== Weekly charts ===
Weekly chart performance for Might Delete Later
Chart (2024)	Peak position
Australian Albums (ARIA)	2
Australian Hip Hop/R&B Albums (ARIA)	1
Austrian Albums (Ö3 Austria)	14
Belgian Albums (Ultratop Flanders)	11
Belgian Albums (Ultratop Wallonia)	55
Canadian Albums (Billboard)	3
Danish Albums (Hitlisten)	11
Dutch Albums (Album Top 100)	8
Finnish Albums (Suomen virallinen lista)	27
German Albums (Offizielle Top 100)	31
Hungarian Albums (MAHASZ)	29
Icelandic Albums (Tónlistinn)	6
Irish Albums (OCC)	6
Italian Albums (FIMI)	95
Lithuanian Albums (AGATA)	5
New Zealand Albums (RMNZ)	1
Nigerian Albums (TurnTable)	12
Norwegian Albums (VG-lista)	5
Portuguese Albums (AFP)	6
Spanish Albums (Promusicae)	74
Swedish Albums (Sverigetopplistan)	11
Swiss Albums (Schweizer Hitparade)	5
UK Albums (OCC)	7
UK R&B Albums (OCC)	9
US Billboard 200	2
US Top R&B/Hip-Hop Albums (Billboard)	1

=== Year-end charts ===
Year-end chart performance for Might Delete Later
Chart (2024)	Position
US Top R&B/Hip-Hop Albums (Billboard)	63
