= T-Minus (producer) =

Canadian record producer (born 1988)

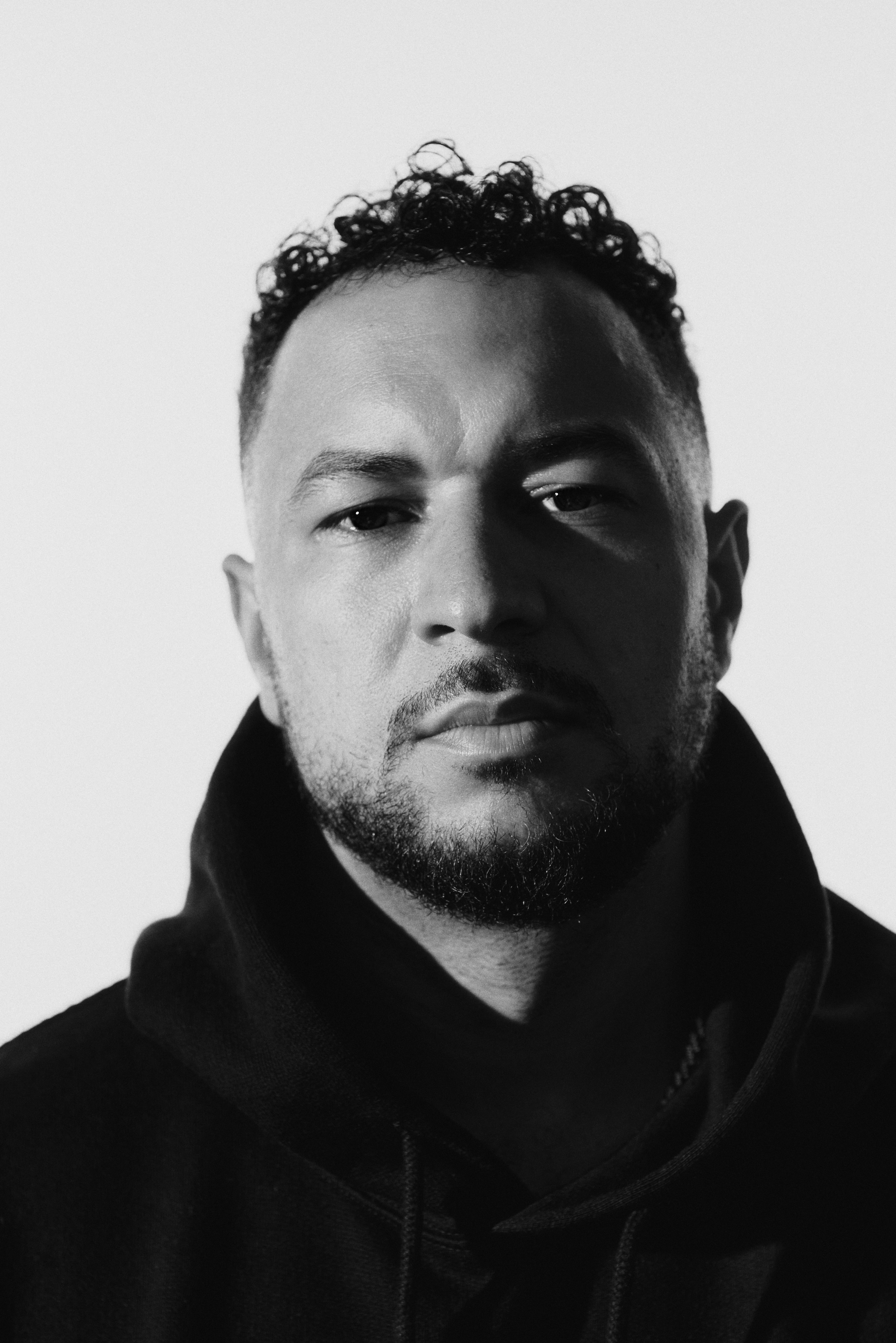

Background information
- Born: Tyler Mathew Carl Williams; February 25, 1988 (age 38); Ajax, Ontario, Canada
- Genres: Hip hop; trap; R&B
- Occupations: Record producer; songwriter
- Instruments: Drum machine; keyboards; turntable; sampler; FL Studio
- Years active: 2006–present

Tyler Mathew Carl Williams (born February 25, 1988), known professionally as T-Minus, is a Canadian record producer. Noted for his downtempo, synth-driven production style, he was an early collaborator of fellow Ontario native Drake, having produced his 2007 single "Replacement Girl". Williams has since contributed to several of Drake's hits, including "HYFR", "The Motto", "Make Me Proud" (featuring Nicki Minaj) and "Blem".

Williams has also produced for high-profile music industry acts in hip hop and R&B, including Nicki Minaj, The Weeknd, Lil Wayne, Logic, Eminem, Kendrick Lamar, Camila Cabello, Travis Scott, Justin Bieber, Belly, ASAP Rocky, Big Sean, DMX, DJ Khaled, 2 Chainz, Lana Del Rey, Sia, H.E.R., J. Cole, Ciara and Nelly Furtado, among others. He has contributed to eight Grammy Award-nominated singles or albums, and received an Album of the Year nomination for his work on Lamar's Good Kid, M.A.A.D. City (2012). He won Top Producer at BMI's 2012 R&B/Hip Hop Awards.

== Early life ==
T-Minus first started experimenting with music as a student at Pickering High School. "I’ve always loved music," he says. "I used to play the drums, so I’ve always been interested in music in that way." After playing the drum kit for a few years, he decided to try making his own rhythms, which led him to download the digital audio workstation program Fruity Loops at the age of 15. Soon after, he started creating full songs using the software.

== Artistry ==
On his sound, T-Minus has said: "I'm just taking things to a new place as far as music goes. I don't want to go to the same route that I was going to before so far as how everything sounds, how everything sits in your ears... I'm going back to the roots of R&B, mid-'90s, from hearing a Timbaland record, an Aaliyah, something from Blackground Music, for example. When the music had so much emotion."

== Awards and nominations ==
Year	Award	Category	Result
2013	Grammy Awards	Best Rap Song (Drake featuring Lil Wayne – "The Motto")	Nominated
2014	Grammy Awards	Album of the Year (Kendrick Lamar – Good Kid, M.A.A.D City)	Nominated
2019	Grammy Awards	Best Rap Performance (J. Cole – "Middle Child")	Nominated
2019	Grammy Awards	Album of the Year (H.E.R. – I Used to Know Her)	Nominated
2019	Grammy Awards	Best Rap/Sung Performance (Young Thug featuring J.Cole and Travis Scott – "The London")	Nominated
2019	Grammy Awards	Best Rap Album (Dreamville – Revenge of the Dreamers III)	Nominated
2022	Grammy Awards	Album of the Year (J. Cole – The Off-Season)	Nominated
2022	Grammy Awards	Best Melodic Rap Performance (J. Cole featuring Lil Baby – "Pride Is the Devil")	Nominated

He also won Top Producer at the 2012 BMI Urban Awards.

== Discography ==
=== Singles produced ===
Year	Single	Chart positions						Album
Year	Single	US Hot 100	US R&B	US Rap	US Pop	CAN	UK	Album
2009	"How Low" (Ludacris)	6	2	1	–	41	67	Battle of the Sexes
2010	"Moment 4 Life" (Nicki Minaj featuring Drake)	13	1	1	18	27	22	Pink Friday
2011	"I'm On One" (DJ Khaled featuring Drake, Rick Ross and Lil Wayne)	10	1	1	35	67	78	We the Best Forever
2011	"She Will" (Lil Wayne featuring Drake)	3	1	2	–	16	58	Tha Carter IV
2011	"Make Me Proud" (Drake featuring Nicki Minaj)	9	1	1	–	25	49	Take Care
2011	"The Motto" (Drake featuring Lil Wayne)	14	1	1	25	38	22	Take Care
2012	"HYFR" (Drake featuring Lil Wayne)	62	20	17	–	–	–	Take Care
2012	"My Moment" (DJ Drama featuring 2 Chainz, Meek Mill and Jeremih)	89	23	16	–	–	–	Quality Street Music
2012	"Swimming Pools (Drank)" (Kendrick Lamar)	17	3	3	–	–	63	Good Kid, M.A.A.D City
2012	"Go Get It" (T.I.)	77	40	23	–	86	–	Trouble Man: Heavy Is the Head
2012	"She Don't Put It Down" (Joe Budden featuring Lil Wayne and Tank)	96	32	–	–	–	–	No Love Lost
2013	"Rich as Fuck" (Lil Wayne featuring 2 Chainz)	38	11	9	–	–	–	I Am Not a Human Being II
2013	"Heartbreaker" (Justin Bieber)	13	–	–	–	15	14	Journals
2017	"Somethin Tells Me" (Bryson Tiller)	74	29	–	–	–	84	True to Self
2017	"Broke" (Lecrae)	–	–	–	–	–	–	All Things Work Together
2019	"The London" (Young Thug featuring J. Cole and Travis Scott)	12	6	1	–	6	18	So Much Fun
2019	"Middle Child" (J. Cole)	4	2	2	–	4	9	Revenge of the Dreamers III
2020	"Give Up" (Russ)	–	–	–	–	–	–	Non-album single
2020	"Lion King on Ice" (J. Cole)	51	15	–	–	59	65	Lewis Street
2021	"Interlude" (J. Cole)	8	5	–	–	16	25	The Off-Season
2021	"The Jackie" (J. Cole featuring Bas and Lil Tjay)	78	26	–	–	60	100	[BUMP] Pick Me Up
2024	"Corazón" (Nelly Furtado with Bomba Estéreo)	–	–	–	–	–	–	7
2025	"Kick Out" (Travis Scott featuring 21 Savage)	50	12	–	–	58	66	JackBoys 2

=== 2007 ===
==== Drake – Comeback Season ====
- 05. "Replacement Girl" (featuring Trey Songz) (produced with Boi-1da)

=== 2008 ===
==== Plies – Da REAList ====
- 15. "Co-Defendant"

==== Papa Duck ====
- 00. "Look At My Swagg" (featuring Rick Ross & Ace Hood)

==== Tyra B. ====
- 00. "Break You Up"

=== 2009 ===
==== LeToya Luckett – Lady Love ====
- 11. "Drained"

==== Mýa – Beauty & The Streets Vol.1 ====
- 15. "Black Out"

==== Birdman – Priceless ====
- 01. "Intro"

==== Birdman – Family Over Everything ====
- 02. "She Knows" (featuring Lil Wayne)

==== Ace Hood – The Preview ====
- 15. "White Leather"

==== Jazzfeezy – Jazzfeezy Presents: Unveiling the Rapture ====
- 03. Unstoppable" (featuring Burna, Bass Line and Dean Gray) (produced with Jazzfeezy)
- 04. "Words Won't Do" (featuring August) (produced with Jazzfeezy and Boi-1da)
- 14. "Flying High" (featuring Phax and Red Shortz) (produced with Jazzfeezy)

==== Rebstar – Arrival ====
- 12. "Without You" (featuring Trey Songz)

==== The Weeknd ====
- 00. "Our Love"

=== 2010 ===
==== Donnis – Fashionably Late ====
- 05. "Tonight"

==== Ludacris – Battles of the Sexes ====
- 02. "How Low"
- 16. "How Low (Remix)" (featuring Ciara & Pitbull)

==== Travis Porter – Proud to Be a Problem ====
- 14. "Mighty Mighty" (featuring F.L.Y.)

==== Travis Porter – I Am Travis Porter ====
- 17. "Lay Ya Body Down"

==== Diggy Simmons – Airborne ====
- 02. "Thinkin' 'Bout U" (featuring Bei Maejor)

==== A-Game – PilotModeMuzik ====
- 00. "Go Head Shawty"
- 00. "Airplanes"
- 00. "Don't Be Mad"

==== Lil Scrappy – Prince of the South 2 ====
Leftover

- 00. "Get Lost" (featuring Cutty)

==== P. Reign ====
- 00. "In My Hood"

==== Lyfe Jennings – I Still Believe ====
- 01. "Statistics"
- 02. "Love"
- 04. "Spotlight"
- 07. "Mama"
- 10. "Learn From This"

==== T.I. – No Mercy ====
- 12. "Poppin Bottles" (featuring Drake)

==== Ciara – Basic Instinct ====
- 09. "Turn It Up" (featuring Usher)

==== Nicki Minaj – Pink Friday ====
- 07. "Moment 4 Life" (featuring Drake)

==== Luu Breeze – HollaLaLuuie ====
- 05. "Makin' A Killin'" (featuring Vado)

=== 2011 ===
==== DJ Khaled – We the Best Forever ====
- 01. "I'm On One" (featuring Drake, Rick Ross & Lil Wayne) (produced with 40 and Kromatik)

==== Lil Wayne – Tha Carter IV ====
- 06. "She Will" (featuring Drake)

==== Wale – Ambition ====
- 11. "Ambition" (featuring Meek Mill & Rick Ross)

==== T-Pain – RevolveR ====
- 01. "Bang Bang Pow Pow" (featuring Lil Wayne)

==== Drake – Take Care ====
- 07. "Under Ground Kings" (Produced with Noah "40" Shebib)
- 08. "We'll Be Fine" (featuring Birdman)
- 09. "Make Me Proud" (featuring Nicki Minaj)
- 14. "HYFR" (featuring Lil Wayne)
- 19. Bonus Track: "The Motto" (featuring Lil Wayne)

==== A-Game – Since 1988 ====
- 11. "Cool Boyz" / 00. "Cool Boyz" (Remix) (featuring Red Cafe)

==== Don Trip & Starlito – Step Brothers ====
- 12. "Pray For Me"

==== Alley Boy – Definition of Fuck Shit 2 ====
- 07. "Word Law" (featuring Veli Sosa)

==== Birdman & Mack Maine – Billionaire Minds ====
- 04. "Mr. Lottery" (featuring Short Dawg & Jae Millz)

=== 2012 ===
==== T.I. – Fuck da City Up ====
- 03. "Hot Wheels" (featuring Travis Porter & Young Dro)

==== Melanie Fiona – The MF Life ====
- 04. "I Been That Girl"

==== Nicki Minaj – Pink Friday: Roman Reloaded ====
- 07. "Champion" (featuring Nas, Drake and Young Jeezy) (produced with Boi-1da)

==== D-WHY – Don't Flatter Yourself ====
Leftover

- 00. "Macchiato Music"

==== Burd & Keyz – Keyz of Life ====
- 05. "Faithful" (featuring Luu Breeze, A-Game & Jahron B) (produced with Burd & Keyz)

==== Tank – This Is How I Feel ====
- 05. "Compliments" (featuring Kris Stephens & T.I.)

==== DJ Drama – Quality Street Music ====
- 03. "My Moment" (featuring 2 Chainz, Meek Mill & Jeremih)

==== Slaughterhouse – Welcome to: Our House ====
- 04. "Throw That" (featuring Eminem) (co-produced by Eminem)
- 12. "Frat House" (co-produced by Eminem and Nikhil S.)

==== Kendrick Lamar – good kid, m.A.A.d city ====
- 09. "Swimming Pools (Drank)"

==== Cyhi the Prynce – Ivy League Club ====
- 13. "Tomorrow"

Roscoe Dash – Roscoe 2.0

- 17. "Substance Abuse"

==== T-Pain – Stoic ====
- 03. "Don't You Quit"

==== Keyshia Cole – Woman to Woman ====
- 02. Zero (featuring Meek Mill) (produced with Vidal)
- 11. Forever

==== T.I. – Trouble Man: Heavy Is the Head ====
- 08. "Go Get It"
- 09. "Guns and Roses" (featuring P!nk)
- 12. "Addresses"

==== ASAP Rocky – Long. Live. ASAP ====
- 03. "PMW (All I Need)" (featuring ScHoolboy Q)

=== 2013 ===
==== Jigg – High Grade 2 ====
- 03. "So Hot"

==== Joe Budden – No Love Lost ====
- 03. "She Don't Put It Down" (featuring Lil Wayne & Tank)
- 17. "She Don't Put It Down (Remix)" (featuring Fabolous, Twista & Tank)

==== Lil Wayne – I Am Not a Human Being II ====
- 09. "Rich as Fuck" (featuring 2 Chainz)

==== Kelly Rowland – Talk a Good Game ====
- 04. "Talk a Good Game" (featuring Kevin Cossom)

==== Justin Bieber – Journals ====
- 01. "Heartbreaker" (produced with Maejor Ali & Chef Tone)

=== 2014 ===
Wink Loc

- 00. "Want Me Dead (featuring Jeezy and Jigg)"

Bizzle – Well Wishes

- 13. "You Know (Remix)" (featuring Lecrae) (produced with Boi-1da)

==== Eric Bellinger – The Rebirth ====
- 06. "Delorean" (produced with Matthew Burnett)

==== Tinashe ====
- 00. "In The Meantime"

=== 2015 ===
==== Big Sean – "Dark Sky Paradise" ====
- 07. "Win Some, Lose Some" (produced with Boi-1da)

==== Ludacris – "Ludaversal" ====
- 16. "Problems" (featuring Cee-Lo Green)

=== 2016 ===
==== Travis Scott – Birds in the Trap Sing McKnight ====
- 14. "wonderful" (featuring The Weeknd) (produced with Boi-1da, Mike Dean and Travis Scott)

=== 2017 ===
==== Drake – More Life ====
- 07. "Blem" (produced with Frank Dukes)
- 12. "Sacrifices" (featuring 2 Chainz and Young Thug) (produced with Deejae)

==== Bryson Tiller – True to Self ====
- 18. "Somethin Tells Me"

==== Lana Del Rey – Lust for Life ====
- 06. "Summer Bummer" (produced with Jahaan Sweet, Boi-1da and Rick Nowels)

==== Lecrae – All Things Work Together ====
- 03. "Broke" (produced with Nikhil Seetharam and Boi-1da)

==== PartyNextDoor – Seven Days ====
- 03. "Damage" (with Halsey) (produced with Frank Dukes)

==== Belly – Mumble Rap ====
- 02. "Make a Toast" (produced with Boi-1da, Vinylz, Allen Ritter and DannyBoyStyles)
- 03. "The Come Down Is Real Too"

=== 2018 ===
==== 6LACK – East Atlanta Love Letter ====
- 06. "Pretty Little Fears" (featuring J. Cole) (produced with Yakob)

A Boogie wit da Hoodie – Hoodie SZN

- 05. "Startender" (featuring Offset & Tyga)

==== Camila Cabello – Camila ====
- 05. "Inside Out" (produced with Frank Dukes)

==== Rich the Kid – The World Is Yours ====
- 10. "Early Morning Trappin" (featuring Trippie Redd) (produced with J. Valle)

==== Tinashe – Joyride ====
- 04. "He Don't Want It"

==== 2 Chainz – The Play Don't Care Who Makes It ====
- 02. "Proud" (featuring YG & Offset) (produced with J. Valle)

==== J. Cole – KOD ====
- 07. "Kevin's Heart" (produced with Mark Pelli)

==== Drake – Scorpion ====
- 25. "March 14" (produced with J. Valle)

==== SAFE ====
- "No Diamonds" (produced with ADP)

=== 2019 ===
==== Rich the Kid – The World Is Yours 2 ====
- 06. "Two Cups" (featuring Offset & Big Sean)

==== Dreamville – Revenge of the Dreamers III ====
- 16. "Middle Child" (performed by J. Cole) (produced with J. Cole)

==== Young Thug – So Much Fun ====
- 17. "Mannequin Challenge" (featuring. Juice Wrld) (produced with J. Cole + ProbByc03)
- 19. "The London" (featuring J. Cole & Travis Scott)

=== 2020 ===
==== Aminé – Limbo ====
- 05. "Can't Decide"
- 06. "Compensating" (featuring Young Thug)

==== J. Cole – The Fall Off ====
"Lion King on Ice"

=== 2021 ===
==== J. Cole - The Off-Season ====
- 02. "a m a r i"
- 06. "1 0 0 . m i l'"
- 07. "p r i d e . i s . t h e . d e v i l"
- 09. "i n t e r l u d e"

Young Thug - Punk

- 02. "Stressed" (featuring J. Cole & T-Shyne)

Juice WRLD - Fighting Demons

- 08. "Rockstar In His Prime"

Bas

- "The Jackie" (featuring J. Cole & Lil Tjay)

IDK - USEE4YOURSELF

- 06. "Shoot My Shot" (featuring Offset)

Eminem - Music to Be Murdered By - Side B

- 14. "Zeus" (featuring White Gold)

=== 2022 ===
==== Virgin Miri ====
- Basic Ordinary Ugly

=== 2023 ===
==== Virgin Miri ====
- Kill Me
- Make a Movie (feat. Young Thug)
- h4msterb0y
- Only God Forgives

=== 2024 ===
==== Erick the Architect - I've Never Been Here Before ====
- 11. Colette

==== Virgin Miri ====
- Roller Girl
- Don't Wanna Be Saved

==== Bas - We Only Talk About Real Shit When We're Fucked Up ====
- 04. Home Alone

==== J. Cole - Might Delete Later ====
- 01. Pricey (with Ari Lennox featuring Young Dro and Gucci Mane)
- 02.Crocodile Tearz
- 03. Ready '24 (featuring Cam'ron)
- 04. Huntin' Wabbitz
- 10. 3001
- 12. 7 Minute Drill

==== Wale - Ghetto Speak ====
- Mission Statement (featuring T-Minus)

==== Nelly Furtado - 7 ====
- 02. Corazón (featuring Bomba Estéreo)
- 07. Crown (featuring Blxckie)
- 09. Save Your Breath (featuring Williane 108, Charmie, Taborah Johnson and Tynomi Banks)
- 11. Fantasy
- 13. Take Me Down

=== 2025 ===
==== Lizzo - My Face Hurts From Smiling ====
- 07. Bend It Ova

==== Travis Scott - Jackboys 2 ====
- 04. Kick Out

=== 2026 ===
==== J.Cole - Birthday Blizzard '26 ====
- 04. 99 Build Freestyle

==== J.Cole - The Fall-Off ====
Disc 29

- 2. Two Six
- 4. Run a Train
- 5. Poor Thang
- 6. Legacy
- 8. Who TF Iz You
- 9. Drum N Bass
- 10. The Let Out
- 11. Bombs in the Ville / Hit the Gas

Disc 39

- 1. 39 Intro
- 3. The Villest (with Erykah Badu)
- 4. Old Dog (with Petey Pablo)
- 5. Life Sentence
- 6. Only You (with Burna Boy)
- 7. Man Up Above
- 9. What If (with Morray)

== See also ==
- Category:Albums produced by T-Minus (producer)
- Category:Songs written by T-Minus (producer)
