= List of songs recorded by Nicki Minaj =

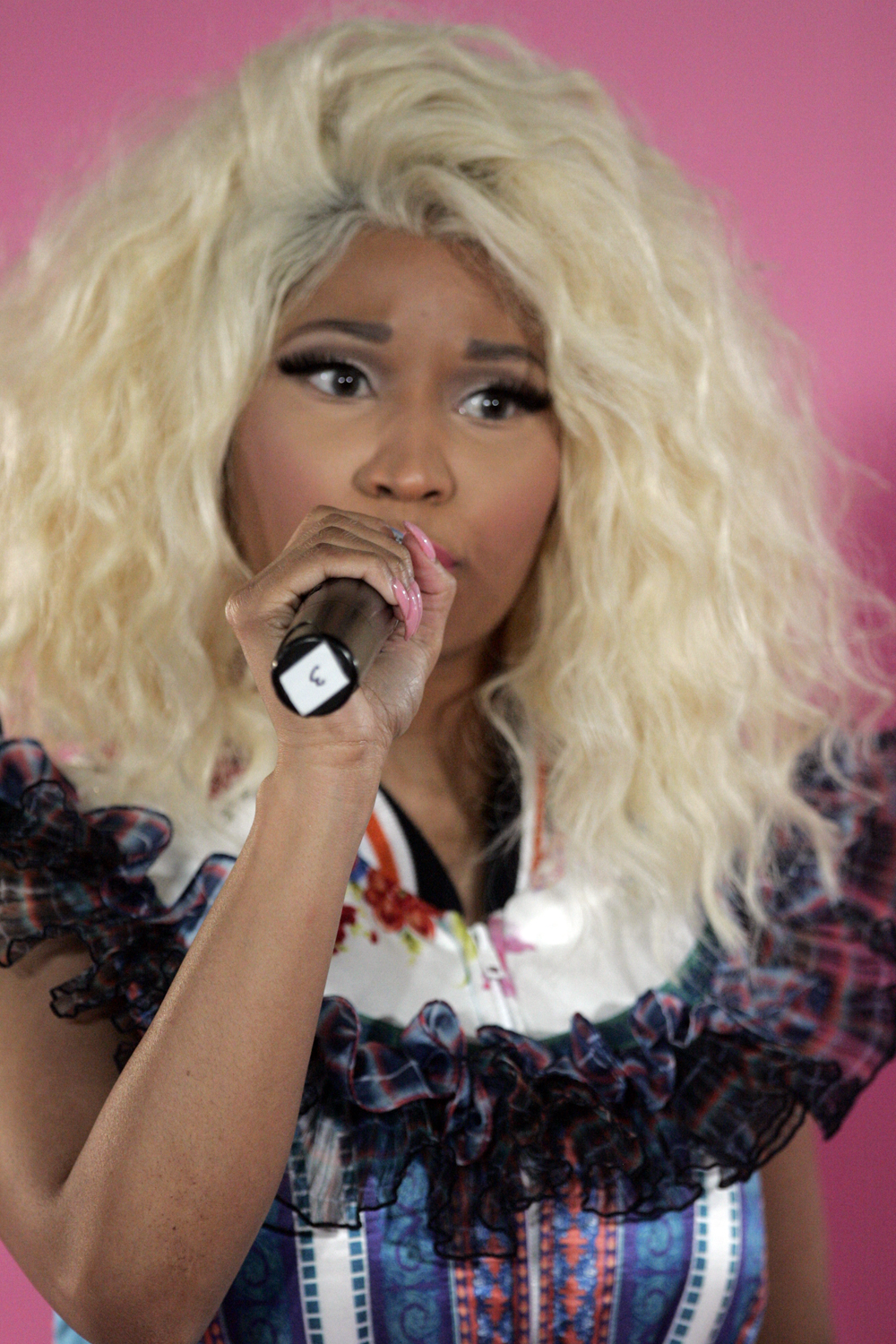
Minaj at the launch of her perfume Pink Friday in Sydney, Australia, 2012

The Trinidadian rapper Nicki Minaj has recorded songs for five studio albums, one re-issue and three mixtapes, some of which were collaborations with other performers. (Note: Minaj is credited as a writer by the BMI and in inlay covers of albums as Onika Maraj/Onika Tanya Maraj, her birth name.) Her debut album, Pink Friday, was released in November 2010. "Your Love" was released as the lead single; it contains a sample of British singer-songwriter Annie Lennox's song "No More I Love You's". Minaj wrote the songs "Roman's Revenge" (which features American rapper Eminem) and "Here I Am" in collaboration with producer Swizz Beatz. "Roman's Revenge" references both artists' alter-egos, Roman Zolanski for Minaj and Slim Shady for Eminem. She co-wrote the song "Did It On'em" with Grammy Award-winning American producer Bangladesh, alongside Justin Ellington and Safaree Lloyd Samuels. Minaj and J. R. Rotem worked together on the seventh and eighth single releases "Girls Fall Like Dominoes" and "Fly", which features Barbadian recording artist Rihanna. On "Girls Fall Like Dominoes", Minaj raps about how she can steal fans from male artists in the music industry, specifically Lil Wayne and Drake. Rihanna's contribution to the "inspirational" ballad "Fly" was added at Minaj's request, as noted by Jayson Rodriquez writing for MTV News. Andrew "Pop" Wansel and Warren "Oak" Felder co-wrote three tracks with Minaj, including "Your Love", "Save Me" and "Muny".

Minaj released her second studio album, Pink Friday: Roman Reloaded, in April 2012. The lead single, "Starships", is a hybrid of genres, combining Eurodance, Europop and Euro house. It was written by Minaj in collaboration with Wayne Hector and its producers Carl Falk, RedOne and Rami Yacoub. They also wrote the songs "Pound the Alarm", "Whip It" and "Automatic" together. "Pound the Alarm" became her first song as a lead artist to peak at number one on the United States' Hot Dance Club Songs. Minaj reunited with Andrew "Pop" Wansel and Warren "Oak" Felder on the songs "Right by My Side" featuring Chris Brown and "Fire Burns". Critics noted how Minaj sings in addition to rapping on "Right by My Side", and described it as an upbeat take on a downtempo pop ballad. Minaj wrote the song "Marilyn Monroe" in collaboration with Ross Golan and its producers J. R. Rotem and production team Dreamlab. The American actress Marilyn Monroe is mentioned numerous times throughout the song, and its lyrics are inspired by a famous quote "I'm selfish, impatient and a little insecure. I make mistakes, I am out of control and at times hard to handle. But if you can't handle me at my worst, then you sure as hell don't deserve me at my best"; which is incorrectly attributed to Monroe.

In November 2012, the rapper released Pink Friday: Roman Reloaded – The Re-Up, a re-issue of her second studio album. In addition to the songs from Pink Friday: Roman Reloaded, the album includes an additional seven new songs recorded by Minaj. "Va Va Voom" was included on Pink Friday: Roman Reloaded as a deluxe edition bonus track, but was included on the standard track listing of Pink Friday: Roman Reloaded – The Re-Up and released as a single from both albums. Minaj wrote the song in collaboration with Dr. Luke and Cirkut. "The Boys", a duet with American recording artist Cassie, was released as Pink Friday: Roman Reloaded – The Re-Up's lead single. It combines a fusion of genres including dancehall and folk music. Other featured artists include Parker on "Hell Yeah" and Ciara on "I'm Legit". "High School", which features Lil Wayne, has a running theme of adultery.

Minaj's third studio album, The Pinkprint, was released in December 2014. It included songs such as "Anaconda," "Pills N Potions," "Only," and "Bed of Lies."

In August 2018, Minaj released her long-delayed fourth studio album, Queen, which was preceded by singles "Chun-Li," "Barbie Tingz," "Bed," and promotional single "Rich Sex." "Barbie Dreams" was released as the fourth single after the album's release. The album includes features from several artists, including Eminem ("Majesty"), Ariana Grande ("Bed"), Lil Wayne ("Rich Sex"), Foxy Brown ("Coco Chanel") and The Weeknd ("Thought I Knew You").

Minaj accomplished her first number one hit on the Billboard Hot 100 in May 2020, with the release of the remix of Doja Cat's "Say So." Minaj's following single "TROLLZ," which is co-led by previous collaborator 6ix9ine, also reached the top of the chart.

In December 2023, Minaj released her long-awaited fifth studio album, Pink Friday 2, after a five-year hiatus, it was preceded by singles "Super Freaky Girl," "Red Ruby da Sleeze" and "Last Time I Saw You." "Everybody" featuring Lil Uzi Vert and "FTCU" was released as the fourth and fifth singles after the album's release.

== Songs ==
Key
†	Indicates single release
#	Indicates promotional single release

Song	Artist(s)	Writer(s)	Album	Year	Ref(s)
"1, 2, 3, 4" †	Randall Rock featuring Nicki Minaj	Nicki Minaj; Randall Rock	Non-album single	2009	
"2 Lit 2 Late Interlude"	Nicki Minaj	Onika Maraj; Brittany Hazzard; Julian Gramma; Adam King Feeney	Queen	2018	
"5 Star" (Remix) †	Yo Gotti featuring Gucci Mane, Trina and Nicki Minaj	Katrina Taylor; Mario Mims; Onika Maraj; Radric Davis	Live from the Kitchen	2009	
"5 Star"	Lil Wayne featuring Nicki Minaj	Lil Wayne; Onika Maraj	Dedication 6	2017	
"40 Bars"	Nicki Minaj	Nicki Minaj; V. Santiago; C. Rios; J. Baxter; J. Phillips; D. Styles; C. Giles; K. Dean	Playtime Is Over	2007	
"2012 (It Ain't the End)" †	Jay Sean featuring Nicki Minaj	Jared Cotter; Kamaljeet Singh Jhooti; Jonathan Perkins; Jeremy Skaller; Onika Maraj; Robert Larrow	Hit the Lights	2010	
"All Eyes on You" †	Meek Mill featuring Chris Brown and Nicki Minaj	Robert Williams; Alex Delicata; Onika Maraj; Christopher Brown; Andre Davidson; Christopher Wallace; Sean Davidson; Kevin Cossom; Danny Morris; Khaled Khaled	Dreams Worth More Than Money	2015	
"All I Do Is Win" (Remix) #	DJ Khaled featuring T-Pain, Diddy, Nicki Minaj, Rick Ross, Busta Rhymes, Fabolous, Jadakiss, Fat Joe and Swizz Beatz	Faheem Najm; William Roberts; Sean Combs; J. Jackson; Onika Maraj; Trevor Smith; Jason Phillips; Joseph Cartagena; Kasseem Dean; Khaled Khaled	Victory	2010	
"All Things Go" #	Nicki Minaj	Onika Maraj; Matthew Samuels; Ester Dean; Anderson Hernandez; Allen Ritter	The Pinkprint	2014	
"Always Love You"	Elton John, Young Thug & Nicki Minaj	Elton John; Andrew Wotman; Ali Tamposi; Louis Bell; Jeffrey Lamar Williams; Billy Walsh; Onika Maraj	The Lockdown Sessions	2021	
"Anaconda" †	Nicki Minaj	Onika Maraj; Jamal Jones; Jonathan Solone-Myvett; Ernest Clark; Marcos Palacios; Anthony Ray	The Pinkprint	2014	
"Animales"	Romeo Santos featuring Nicki Minaj	Donovan Bennett; Onika Maraj; Sean Roberts; Romeo Santos	Formula, Vol. 2	2014	
"Anybody" †	Young Thug featuring Nicki Minaj	Jeffery Williams; Rex Kudo; Ryan Vojtesak; Onika Maraj	Hear No Evil	2018	
"Are You Gone Already"	Nicki Minaj	Onika Maraj; Finneas O'Connell	Pink Friday 2	2023	
"Automatic"	Nicki Minaj	Geraldo Sandell; Jimmy Thornfeldt; Nadir Khayat; Onika Maraj; Safaree Lloyd Samuels	Pink Friday: Roman Reloaded	2012	
"Back Together" †	Robin Thicke featuring Nicki Minaj	Robin Thicke; Max Martin; Savan Kotecha; Ali Payami; Onika Maraj	Non-album single	2015	
"Bad for You"	Meek Mill featuring Nicki Minaj	Robert Williams; Onika Maraj; Benjamin Diehl	Dreams Worth More Than Money	2015	
"Bad to You"	Ariana Grande, Normani and Nicki Minaj	Ariana Grande; Max Martin; Danny Schofield; Savan Kotecha; Brandon "Bizzy" Hollemon; Ilya Salmanzadeh; Onika Maraj	Charlie's Angels: Original Motion Picture Soundtrack	2019	
"Ball for Me" †	Post Malone featuring Nicki Minaj	Austin Post; Onika Maraj; Louis Bell	Beerbongs and Bentleys	2018	
"Bang Bang" †	Jessie J, Ariana Grande and Nicki Minaj	Max Martin; Savan Kotecha; Rickard Göransson; Onika Maraj	Sweet Talker and My Everything (Deluxe edition)	2014	
"BAPS" †	Trina and Nicki Minaj	Katrina Taylor; Onika Maraj; Brian Willams; B.G. (Baby Gangsta); Mannie Fresh; Terius Gray; Lil Wayne	The One	2019	
"Barbie Dangerous"	Nicki Minaj	Onika Maraj; Joshua Goods; Kameron Cole; Kendall Taylor; Christopher Wallace; Anthony Henderson; Bryon McCane; Steven Howse; Sean Combs; Steven Jordan	Pink Friday 2	2023	
"Barbie Dreams" †	Nicki Minaj	Onika Maraj; Rashad Smith; Melvin Hough II; Rivelino Raoul Wouter; Christopher Wallace; James Brown; Fred Wesley	Queen	2018	
"Barbie Drip" (Remix)	Nicki Minaj	Nicki Minaj; Dominique Jones; Sergio Kitchens; Chandler Durham	Non-album single	2019	
"Barbie Goin Bad" (Remix)	Nicki Minaj	Nicki Minaj; Robert Williams; Aubrey Graham; Wesley Glass; Westen Weiss	Non-album single	2019	
"Barbie Tingz" †	Nicki Minaj	Onika Maraj; Jeremy Reid	Queen (Target and Japanese exclusive version)	2018	
"Barbie World" †	Nicki Minaj and Ice Spice with Aqua		Barbie the Album	2023	
"Beam Me Up Scotty"	Nicki Minaj	Cleveland Browne; Karen Chin; Onika Maraj; Wycliffe Johnson	Beam Me Up Scotty	2009	
"Beautiful Sinner"	Nicki Minaj	Alexander Grant; Ester Dean; Onika Maraj	Pink Friday: Roman Reloaded	2012	
"Beauty and a Beat" †	Justin Bieber featuring Nicki Minaj	Anton Zaslavski; Max Martin; Onika Maraj; Savan Kotecha	Believe	2012	
"Bed" †	Nicki Minaj featuring Ariana Grande	Onika Maraj; Benjamin Diehl; Gamal Lewis; Brett Bailey; Mescon David Asher; Dwayne Chin-Quee	Queen	2018	
"Bed of Lies" †	Nicki Minaj featuring Skylar Grey	Onika Maraj; Holly Hafermann; Daniel Johnson; Jeremy Coleman; Breyan Stanley Isaac; Vinay Vyas; Justin Davey; Alexander Grant	The Pinkprint	2014	
"BedRock" †	Young Money	Dwayne Carter; Aubrey Graham; Lloyd Polite; Carl Lilly; Onika Maraj; Micheal Stevenson; Jarvis Mills; Stephen "Static Major" Garrett	We Are Young Money	2009	
"Beep Beep"	Nicki Minaj	Onika Maraj; Shane Lindstrom; Gavin Valencia	Pink Friday 2	2023	
"Beez in the Trap" †	Nicki Minaj featuring 2 Chainz	Maurice Jordan; Onika Maraj; Tauheed Epps	Pink Friday: Roman Reloaded	2012	
"Best I Ever Had" (Remix)	Nicki Minaj with Drake	Ann Marie Hamilton; Aubrey Graham; Dan Hamilton; Dwayne Carter; Matthew Samuels; Nakia Coleman; Onika Maraj	Beam Me Up Scotty	2009	
"Big Bank" †	YG featuring 2 Chainz, Big Sean and Nicki Minaj	Sean Anderson; Keenon Jackson; Onika Maraj; Nye Lee Jr. Dijon McFarlane; Tauheed Epps	Stay Dangerous	2018	
"Big Daddy"	Nicki Minaj featuring Meek Mill	Onika Maraj; Robert Williams; Ronald LaTour; Johnny Juliano; Daveon Jackson; Brock Korsan	The Pinkprint (Deluxe version)	2014	
"Bitch I'm Madonna" †	Madonna featuring Nicki Minaj	Madonna Ciccone; Thomas Wesley Pentz; Ariel Rechtshaid; Maureen McDonald; Toby Gad; Onika Maraj; Sophie Xeon	Rebel Heart	2015	
"Black Barbies" #	Nicki Minaj and Mike Will Made It	Onika Maraj; Khalif Brown; Aaquil Brown; Radric Davis; Michael Williams	Non-album single	2016	
"Blazin'"	Nicki Minaj featuring Kanye West	Andrew Theilk; Kanye West; Keith Forsey; Onika Maraj; Steve Schiff	Pink Friday	2010	
"Blick Blick" †	Coi Leray & Nicki Minaj	Coi Leray Collins; Onika Maraj; Ryan Ogren; Rocco Valdes; Randall Hammers; Mike Crook; Lukasz Gottwald; Asia Smith	Non-album single	2022	
"Blow Ya Mind"	Nicki Minaj	Brandon John Holleman; Danny Schofield; Larry Nacht; Onika Maraj; Safaree Lloyd Samuels; Steven Mitchell	Pink Friday (Deluxe version)	2010	
"Bom Bidi Bom"	Nick Jonas and Nicki Minaj	Jason Evigan; Breyan Isaac; Marcel Botezan; Sebastian Barac; Nicki Minaj	Fifty Shades Darker: Original Motion Picture Soundtrack	2017	
"Boo'd Up" (Remix) †	Ella Mai, Nicki Minaj and Quavo	Joelle James; Ella Mai; Dijon McFarlane; Larrance Dopson; Nicki Minaj; Quavo	Non-album single	2018	
"Born Stunna" (Remix) †	Birdman featuring Rick Ross, Nicki Minaj and Lil Wayne	Bryan Williams; Williams Roberts II; Onika Maraj; Dwayne Carter; Shamann Cooke	Non-album single	2012	
"Boss Ass Bitch" (Remix) †	Nicki Minaj featuring PTAF	Nicki Minaj; Kandise Nathan; Shontel Moore; Keyona Reed; Eric Tandoc	Beam Me Up Scotty (2021 reissue)	2013	
"Bottoms Up" †	Trey Songz featuring Nicki Minaj	Daniel Johnson; Edrick Miles; Milton Lamont James; Onika Maraj; Tong E. Scales; Tremaine Neverson	Passion, Pain & Pleasure	2010	
"Boyz" †	Jesy Nelson featuring Nicki Minaj	Oladayo Olatunji; Hanni Ibrahim; Jesy Nelson; Onika Maraj-Petty; Abby Keen; Amanda Atoui; Avital Levy; Patrick Jordan-Patrikios	Non-album single	2021	
"The Boys" †	Nicki Minaj and Cassie	Onika Maraj; Jonas Jeberg; Jean Baptiste; Anjulie Persaud	Pink Friday: Roman Reloaded – The Re-Up	2012	
"Bussin" †	Nicki Minaj & Lil Baby	Onika Maraj; Dominique Jones; Cyrick Palmer; Joshua Goods; Rahsul Barnes Greer; Terrell Greenlee	Non-album single	2022	
"Bust Down Barbiana" (Remix)	Nicki Minaj	Nicki Minaj; Johnathan Porter; John Nathaniel	Non-album single	2019	
"Buy a Heart"	Nicki Minaj featuring Meek Mill	Onika Maraj; Robert Williams; Christian Ward; Armond Redmen	The Pinkprint	2014	
"Can Anybody Hear Me?"	Nicki Minaj	Davaughn; James Dean; Onika Maraj; William Wooten	Beam Me Up Scotty	2009	
"Can't Stop, Won't Stop"	Lil Wayne and Nicki Minaj	Nicki Minaj; Lil Wayne; Branch, D. Glover, N. Glover, M. Morris, E. Muhammed, H. Myers, D. Ries, C. Wiggins, R. Williams, G. Marlon Williams	Playtime Is Over and Da Drought 3	2007	
"Catch Me"	Nicki Minaj	Kaseem Dean; Onika Maraj	Pink Friday (Bonus track)	2010	
"Champion"	Nicki Minaj featuring Nas, Drake and Young Jeezy	Aubrey Graham; Jay Jenkins; Nasir Jones; Nikhil Seetharam; Onika Maraj; Tyler Williams	Pink Friday: Roman Reloaded	2012	
"Changed It" †	Nicki Minaj and Lil Wayne	Onika Maraj; Dwayne Carter; Noel Fisher; Sidney Swift; Alex Goodwin	Non-album single	2017	
"Check It Out" †	Nicki Minaj and will.i.am	Bruce Woolley; Geoff Downes; Onika Maraj; Trevor Horn; William Adams	Pink Friday	2010	
"Check It Out" (Special Mix) †	Nicki Minaj and will.i.am featuring Cheryl Cole	Bruce Woolley; Geoff Downes; Onika Maraj; Trevor Horn; William Adams	Non-album single	2010	
"Chi-Raq"	Nicki Minaj with G Herbo	Allen Ritter; Anderson Hernandez; Herbert Wright III; Matthew Samuels; Onika Maraj	Beam Me Up Scotty (2021 reissue)	2014	
"Chun-Li" †	Nicki Minaj	Onika Maraj; Jeremy Reid	Queen	2018	
"Chun Swae"	Nicki Minaj featuring Swae Lee	Onika Maraj; Khalif Brown; Leland Wayne	Queen	2018	
"Clappers" †	Wale featuring Nicki Minaj and Juicy J	Olubowale Akintimehin; Onika Maraj; Jordan Houston; M. Henry Spencer	The Gifted	2013	
"Click Clack"	Nicki Minaj	Nicki Minaj; Pharrell Williams; Chad Hugo; Slim Thug; Pusha T	Playtime Is Over	2007	
"Coca Coca"	Gucci Mane featuring Rocko, OJ da Juiceman, Waka Flocka, Shawty Lo, Yo Gotti and Nicki Minaj	Gucci Mane; Rocko; OJ da Juiceman; Waka Flocka; Shawty Lo; Yo Gotti; Nicki Minaj	Burrrprint (2) HD	2010	
"Coco Chanel"	Nicki Minaj featuring Foxy Brown	Onika Maraj; Joshua Adams; Inga Marchand; Ashley Bannister; Dillon Hart Francis; Sonny Moore	Queen	2018	
"Come on a Cone"	Nicki Minaj	Chauncey Hollis; Onika Maraj	Pink Friday: Roman Reloaded	2012	
"Come See About Me"	Nicki Minaj	Onika Maraj; Brittany Hazzard; Christopher Braide; Henry Walter	Queen	2018	
"The Creep" †	The Lonely Island featuring Nicki Minaj	Akiva Schaffer; Andy Samberg; Jorma Taccone; Scott Jung; Onika Maraj	Turtleneck & Chain	2011	
"Crocodile Teeth"	Nicki Minaj with Skillibeng	Andreas Olov Nilsson; Emwah Warmington; John Scilipoti; Onika Maraj	Beam Me Up Scotty (2021 reissue)	2021	
"The Crying Game"	Nicki Minaj featuring Jessie Ware	Onika Maraj; Jessie Ware; Andrew Wansel; Warren Felder; Steven Mostyn	The Pinkprint	2014	
"Dance (A$$)" (Remix) †	Big Sean featuring Nicki Minaj	Onika Maraj; Sean Anderson	Finally Famous	2011	
"Dang a Lang"	Trina featuring Nicki Minaj and Lady Saw	DJ Frank E Chef Tone; Reginald Saunders; Trina; Nicki Minaj; Lady Saw	Amazin'	2010	
"Dark Fantasy" (Note: According to the inlay cover of My Beautiful Dark Twisted Fantasy, Minaj is neither credited as a featured artist nor a co-writer of "Dark Fantasy". She is, however, credited with background vocals alongside Justin Vernon (of band Bon Iver).)	Kanye West	Ernest Wilson; Jeff Bhasker; Jon Anderson; Kanye West; Malik Jones; Mike Dean; Mike Oldfield; Robert Diggs	My Beautiful Dark Twisted Fantasy	2010	
"Dark Side of the Moon"	Lil Wayne featuring Nicki Minaj	Dwayne Carter; Onika Maraj; Jamal Reid; Jonah Christian	Tha Carter V	2018	
"Dear Old Nicki"	Nicki Minaj	Daniel Johnson; Onika Maraj	Pink Friday	2010	
"Did It On'em" †	Nicki Minaj	Justin Ellington; Onika Maraj; Safaree Lloyd Samuels; Shondrae Crawford	Pink Friday	2010	
"Dilly Dally"	Nicki Minaj	Nicki Minaj; Shawn Carter; Justin Smith; Rick James; Alonzo Miller; Lawrence Parker	Playtime Is Over	2007	
"Dip" (Alternate version) †	Tyga and Nicki Minaj	Micheal Stevenson; Onika Maraj; David Doman; Adele Elysee	Legendary (Deluxe edition)	2018	
"Do We Have a Problem?" †	Nicki Minaj & Lil Baby	Onika Maraj; Dominique Jones; Anthony Woart Jr. Joshua Goods	Non-album single	2022	
"Don't Hurt Me" †	DJ Mustard, Nicki Minaj and Jeremih	Dijon McFarlane; Nick Audino; Lewis Hughes; Miles Browne; Christopher Ward; Jeremy Felton; Onika Maraj	Cold Summer	2016	
"Dope Dealer"	Meek Mill featuring Rick Ross and Nicki Minaj	Meek Mill; Rick Ross; Nicki Minaj	Dreamchasers 3	2013	
"Down in the DM" (Remix) †	Yo Gotti featuring Nicki Minaj	Mario Mims; Onika Maraj; Khaled Khaled; Benjamin Diehl; Ian Lewis	The Art of Hustle (Deluxe version)	2015	
"Do You Mind" †	DJ Khaled featuring Nicki Minaj, Chris Brown, August Alsina, Jeremih, Future and Rick Ross	Khaled Khaled; Nayvadius Wilburn; Michael Johnson; Johnny Mollings; Leonardo Mollings; Kevin Cossom; Anthony Norris; Sean McMillion; Ralph Jeanty; Onika Maraj; Chris Brown; August Alsina; Jeremy Felton; William Roberts II	Major Key	2016	
"Dreams '07"	Nicki Minaj	Nicki Minaj; Christopher Wallace; Rashad Smith	Playtime Is Over	2007	
"Dumb Blonde" †	Avril Lavigne featuring Nicki Minaj	Avril Lavigne; Onika Maraj; Mitch Allan; Bonnie McKee	Head Above Water	2019	
"Ease Up"	Nicki Minaj featuring Ru Spits	Nicki Minaj	Playtime Is Over	2007	
"Easy"	Nicki Minaj featuring Gucci Mane and Rocko	Onika Maraj; Radric Davis; Rodney Hill Jr. Xavier Dotson	Beam Me Up Scotty	2009	
"Encore '07"	Nicki Minaj	Nicki Minaj; Shawn Carter; Brad Delson; Chester Bennington; Dave Farrell; Joe Hahn; Kanye West; Mike Shinoda; Rob Bourdon	Playtime Is Over	2007	
"Entertainment 2.0" †	Sean Paul featuring Juicy J, 2 Chainz and Nicki Minaj	Tauheed Epps; Brandon Green; Sean Paul Henriques; Jordan Houston; Ronald Ferebee Jr. Onika Maraj; Tony Scales; Jovan Williams	Full Frequency	2013	
"Envy"	Nicki Minaj	Jahmon Pauling; Jonathan Joyner; Onika Maraj	Beam Me Up Scotty	2009	
"Expensive" †	Ty Dolla $ign featuring Nicki Minaj	Tyrone Griffin Jr. Onika Maraj; James Royo; Alexander Krashinsky; Jazaée De Waal; Jordan Jackson; Nye Lee Jr; William Van Zandt	Featuring Ty Dolla $ign	2020	
"Extravagant" †	Lil Durk featuring Nicki Minaj	Durk Banks; Onika Maraj; Jose Julian De La Cruz; Widnick Prevalon	Love Songs 4 the Streets 2	2019	
"Fallin 4 U"	Nicki Minaj	Onika Maraj; Jacob Canady; Darryon Bunton	Pink Friday 2	2023	
"Familia"	Nicki Minaj and Anuel AA featuring Bantu	Onika Tanya Maraj; Tinashe Sibanda; Philip "Pip" Kembo; Emmanuel Gazmey Santiago; Carlos A. Suárez	Spider-Man: Into the Spider-Verse	2018	
"Favorite"	Nicki Minaj featuring Jeremih	Onika Maraj; Robert Williams; Jeremih Felton; Darhyl Camper, Jr. Rob Holladay; Christian Ward	The Pinkprint	2014	
"Feeling Myself"	Nicki Minaj featuring Beyoncé	Onika Maraj; Beyoncé Knowles; Solana Rowe; Chauncey Hollis	The Pinkprint	2014	
"Fefe" †	6ix9ine featuring Nicki Minaj and Murda Beatz	Andrew Green; Daniel Hernandez; Onika Maraj; Shane Lindstrom; Kevin Gomringer; Tim Gomringer	Dummy Boy	2018	
"Fendi" †	PnB Rock featuring Nicki Minaj and Murda Beatz	Rakim Hasheem Allen; Shane Lindstrom; Foster; Onika Tanya Maraj	Non-album single	2019	
"Finale"	Young Money	Carl Watts; Carl Lilly Jr. Jarvis Mills; Micheal Stevenson; Rashad Ballard; Christopher Moore; Onika Maraj; Shanell Woodgett; Jermaine Preyan; Aubrey Drake Graham; Dwayne Carter; Marco Rodriguez-Diaz; Angel Aponte	We Are Young Money	2009	
"Fireball" †	Willow Smith featuring Nicki Minaj	Lazonate Franklin; Marc Kitchen; Omarr Rambert; Onika Maraj	Non-album single	2011	
"Fire Burns"	Nicki Minaj	Andrew Wansel; Onika Maraj; Warren Felder	Pink Friday: Roman Reloaded	2012	
"Flawless Remix" †	Beyoncé featuring Nicki Minaj	Beyoncé Knowles; Terius Nash; Chauncey Hollis; Raymond DeAndre Martin; Onika Maraj	Beyoncé: Platinum Edition	2014	
"Fly" †	Nicki Minaj featuring Rihanna	C. Rishad; J. R. Rotem; K. Hissink; Onika Maraj; W. Jordan	Pink Friday	2010	
"For the Love of New York"	Polo G & Nicki Minaj	Taurus Bartlett; Onika Maraj	Hall of Fame	2021	
"For the Money"	Fabolous and Nicki Minaj	Fabolous; Nicki Minaj	There Is No Competition 2: The Funeral Service	2010	
"Four Door Aventador"	Nicki Minaj	Onika Maraj; Asabe Ighile; Parker Ighile	The Pinkprint	2014	
"Fractions"	Nicki Minaj	Derrick Milano; Joshua Goods; Kendall Taylor; Norman Whitfield; Onika Maraj	Beam Me Up Scotty (2021 reissue)	2021	
"Freaks" †	French Montana featuring Nicki Minaj	Douglas L. Davis; Earl Hood; Eric Goudy III; Everton Bonner; John Christopher Taylor; Karim Kharbouch; Lloyd Oliver Willis; Onika Maraj; Richard Butler Jr. Sly Dunbar	Excuse My French	2013	
"Freedom" †	Nicki Minaj	Onika Maraj; Matthew Samuels; Matthew Burnett	Pink Friday: Roman Reloaded – The Re-Up	2012	
"Freestyle"	Nicki Minaj	Nicki Minaj; Scram Jones; Remy Ma; Fat Joe	Playtime Is Over	2007	
"Froze"	Meek Mill featuring Lil Uzi Vert and Nicki Minaj	Robert Williams; Bennie Briggman; Sonny Uwaezuoke; Symere Woods; Onika Maraj	DC4	2016	
"FTCU" †	Nicki Minaj	Onika Maraj; Juaquin Malphurs; Joshua Luellen; Jacob Canady	Pink Friday 2	2014	
"Fuck da Bullshit"	Young Money	Onika Maraj; Carl Lilly Jr. Dwayne Carter; Aubrey Drake Graham; Bryan Williams; Jesse Woodard; Andrew Wansel; Brandon Carrier	We Are Young Money	2009	
"Ganja Burn"	Nicki Minaj	Onika Maraj; Jeremy Reid; Jairus Mozee	Queen	2018	
"Get It All" †	Sean Garrett featuring Nicki Minaj	Elvis Williams; Onika Maraj; Sean Garrett	The Inkwell	2010	
"Get Like Me" †	Nelly featuring Nicki Minaj and Pharrell	Cornell Haynes, Jr. Onika Maraj; Pharrell Williams	M.O.	2013	
"Get Low" †	Waka Flocka Flame featuring Nicki Minaj, Tyga and Flo Rida	Harvey Miller; Juaquin Malphurs; Matthew Samuels; Micheal Stevenson; Onika Maraj; Tramar Dillard	Triple F Life: Fans, Friends & Family	2012	
"Get on Your Knees"	Nicki Minaj featuring Ariana Grande	Onika Maraj; Katy Perry; Chloe Angelides; Lukasz Gottwald; Sarah Hudson; Jacob Kasher Hindlin; Henry Walter	The Pinkprint	2014	
"Girl on Fire" (Inferno version) †	Alicia Keys featuring Nicki Minaj	Alicia Keys; Billy Squier; Jeff Bhasker; Onika Maraj; Salaam Remi	Girl on Fire	2012	
"Girls Fall Like Dominoes" †	Nicki Minaj	Cleveland Browne; Greville Gordon; J. R. Rotem; Millo Cordell; Onika Maraj; Robbie Furze; Wycliffe Johnson	Pink Friday (Bonus track)	2010	
"Give It All To Me" †	Mavado featuring Nicki Minaj	Khaled Khaled; David Brooks; Onika Maraj; J. Arison	Suffering from Success	2013	
"Give Me All Your Luvin'" †	Madonna featuring Nicki Minaj and M.I.A.	Madonna Ciccone; Martin Solveig; Onika Maraj; Maya Arulpragasam; Michael Tordjman	MDNA	2012	
"Goodbye" †	Jason Derulo and David Guetta featuring Nicki Minaj and Willy William	David Guetta; Philippe Greiss; Willy William; David Saint Fleur; Art Beatz; Curtis Gray; Jean-Michel Sissoko; Dj Paulito; Jazelle Rodriguez; Christopher Tempest; Kinda Ingrosso; Nicki Minaj; Jason Derulo; Francesco Sartori; Lucio Quarantotto; Franck Peterson	7	2018	
"Good Form"	Nicki Minaj	Onika Maraj; Michael Williams II; Asheton Hogan	Queen	2018	
"Good Form" (Remix) †	Nicki Minaj featuring Lil Wayne	Onika Maraj; Michael Williams II; Asheton Hogan; Dwayne Carter	Queen (Deluxe edition)	2018	
"Gotta Go Hard"	Nicki Minaj featuring Lil Wayne	Andrew Harr; Ciara Harris; Elvis Williams; Faheem Najm; Jamal Jones; Jasper Cameron; Jermaine Jackson; Kanye West; Khaled Khaled	Beam Me Up Scotty	2009	
"Grand Piano"	Nicki Minaj	Onika Maraj; Daniel Johnson; Ester Dean; William Adams; Keith Harris; Peter Lord	The Pinkprint	2014	
"Gun Shot"	Nicki Minaj featuring Beenie Man	Ashanti Floyd; Daniel Johnson; Moses Davis; Onika Maraj; Roahn Hylton	Pink Friday: Roman Reloaded	2012	
"Hard White"	Nicki Minaj	Onika Maraj; Matthew Samuels; Ramon Ibanga Jr. Brittany Hazzard	Queen	2018	
"Haterade"	Gucci Mane featuring Pharrell and Nicki Minaj	Radric Davis; Pharrell Williams; Onika Maraj	The Appeal: Georgia's Most Wanted	2010	
"Hello Good Morning" (Remix)	Diddy – Dirty Money featuring Nicki Minaj and Rick Ross	Marcella Araica; Nathaniel Hills; Onika Maraj; Richard Butler	Non-album single	2010	
"Hell Yeah"	Nicki Minaj featuring Parker	Onika Maraj; Parker Ighile	Pink Friday: Roman Reloaded – The Re-Up	2012	
"Here I Am"	Nicki Minaj	Kaseem Dean; Onika Maraj; Robbie Bronnimann; Tyler Williams	Pink Friday	2010	
"Hey Mama" †	David Guetta featuring Nicki Minaj, Bebe Rexha and Afrojack	David Guetta; Giorgio Tuinfort; Nick van de Wall; Ester Dean; Bebe Rexha; Sean Douglas; Onika Maraj	Listen	2015	
"High School" †	Nicki Minaj featuring Lil Wayne	Onika Maraj; Dwayne Carter; Matthew Samuels; Tyler Williams	Pink Friday: Roman Reloaded – The Re-Up	2012	
"The Hills" (Remix) †	The Weeknd featuring Nicki Minaj	Abel Tesfaye; Emmanuel Nickerson; Jeremy Reid; Carlo Montagnese; Ahmad Balshe; Onika Maraj	The Hills Remixes	2015	
"Holy Ground"	Davido featuring Nicki Minaj	David Adeleke; Nicki Minaj; Tobechukwu Victor Okoh; Peruzzi	A Better Time	2020	
"Hood Story"	Nicki Minaj	Nicki Minaj	Playtime Is Over	2007	
"Hot Girl Summer" †	Megan Thee Stallion featuring Nicki Minaj and Ty Dolla $ign	Derrick Milano; Crazy Mike; The Bone Collector; Juicy J Nicki Minaj; Ty Dolla $ign Megan Thee Stallion	Non-album single	2019	
"HOV Lane"	Nicki Minaj	Garrick Smith; Onika Maraj; Ryan Marrone	Pink Friday: Roman Reloaded	2012	
"I Ain't Thru" †	Keyshia Cole featuring Nicki Minaj	Keyshia Cole; Onika Maraj; Russell Gonzalez	Calling All Hearts	2010	
"I Am Your Leader"	Nicki Minaj featuring Cam'ron and Rick Ross	Cameron Giles; Chauncey Hollis; Onika Maraj; William Leonard Roberts II	Pink Friday: Roman Reloaded	2012	
"I B on Dat"	Meek Mill featuring Nicki Minaj, Fabolous and French Montana	Meek Mill; Nicki Minaj; Fabolous; French Montana	Dreamchasers 3	2013	
"I Can't Even Lie"	DJ Khaled featuring Future and Nicki Minaj	Khaled Khaled; Nathaniel Hills; Nayvadius Wilburn; Onika Maraj	Grateful	2017	
"I Don't Give a"	Madonna featuring Nicki Minaj	Madonna Ciccone; Martin Solveig; Onika Maraj; Julien Jabre	MDNA	2012	
"I Endorse These Strippers"	Nicki Minaj featuring Tyga and Brinx	Onika Maraj; Ester Dean; Melvin Hough II; Rivelino Raoul Wouter; Keith Thomas	Pink Friday: Roman Reloaded – The Re-Up	2012	
"I Get Crazy"	Nicki Minaj featuring Lil Wayne	Desmond Ryan; Dwayne Carter; Onika Miraj; Rondell Turner	Beam Me Up Scotty	2009	
"I Lied"	Nicki Minaj	Onika Maraj; Michael Williams; M. Bell; Ester Dean	The Pinkprint	2014	
"I Luv Dem Strippers"	2 Chainz featuring Nicki Minaj	Tauheed Epps; Onika Maraj; Brandon Henshaw; Rico Brooks; Travis McFetridge; Ray Parker Jr.	Based on a T.R.U. Story	2012	
"I Wanna Be with You" †	DJ Khaled featuring Nicki Minaj, Future and Rick Ross	Khaled Khaled; Onika Maraj; Nayvadius Wilburn; William Roberts II; Anthony Norris; Kevin Cossom	Suffering from Success	2013	
"I'm Cumin"	Nicki Minaj	Nicki Minaj; Christopher Wallace; Sean Combs; Steven Jordan; Mason Betha; Bernard Edwards; Nile Rodgers	Playtime Is Over	2007	
"I'm Getting Ready" †	Tasha Cobbs Leonard featuring Nicki Minaj	Matt Redman; Nicki Minaj; Tasha Cobbs Leonard	Heart. Passion. Pursuit.	2017	
"I'm Legit"	Nicki Minaj featuring Ciara	Jawara Headley; Jordan Houston; Onika Maraj; Michael Foster; Micheal Stevenson	Pink Friday: Roman Reloaded – The Re-Up	2012	
"I'm Out" †	Ciara featuring Nicki Minaj	Ciara Harris; Onika Maraj; Rock City	Ciara	2013	
"I'm the Best"	Nicki Minaj	Daniel Johnson; Onika Maraj	Pink Friday	2010	
"Idol" †	BTS featuring Nicki Minaj	Bang Si-hyuk; Ali Tamposi; Onika Maraj; Pdogg; Kim Nam-joon; Roman Campolo; Supreme Boi	Love Yourself: Answer	2018	
"In My Head" (Remix) †	Jason Derulo featuring Nicki Minaj	Jason Desrouleaux; Onika Maraj; Claude Kelly; J.R. Rotem	Jason Derulo (Special Edition) - EP	2011	
"Inspirations Outro"	Nicki Minaj	Onika Maraj; Joshua Adams; Ashley Bannister; Dillon Hart Francis; Sonny Moore	Queen	2018	
"Intro"	Nicki Minaj	Onika Miraj	Beam Me Up Scotty	2009	
"iPHONE"	DaBaby and Nicki Minaj	Jonathan Kirk; Onika Maraj; Ross Portaro IV	Kirk	2019	
"Itty Bitty Piggy"	Nicki Minaj	DeAndre Way; Onika Miraj	Beam Me Up Scotty	2009	
"Jump Off '07"	Nicki Minaj	Nicki Minaj; K. Jones; T. Mosley	Playtime Is Over	2007	
"Keys Under Palm Trees"	Nicki Minaj	Gerrit Wessendorf; Onika Miraj; Thomas Kessler	Beam Me Up Scotty	2009	
"Kill Da DJ"	Nicki Minaj	Onika Miraj; Rondell Turner	Beam Me Up Scotty	2009	
"Kissing Girls"	Gucci Mane featuring Nicki Minaj	Gucci Mane; Nicki Minaj	Writing on the Wall	2009	
"Kissing Strangers" †	DNCE featuring Nicki Minaj	Justin Drew Tranter; Mattias Larsson; Robin Fredriksson; Onika Maraj	DNCE	2017	
"Knockout" †	Lil Wayne featuring Nicki Minaj	Dwayne Carter; Eric Oritz; Kevin Crowe; Onika Maraj	Rebirth	2010	
"Krippy Kush" (Remix) †	Farruko, Nicki Minaj and Bad Bunny featuring 21 Savage and Rvssian	Frank Miami; Alex Killer; 21 Savage; Rvssian; Bad Bunny; Nicki Minaj; Farruko	Non-album single	2017	
"Let Me Calm Down"	Nicki Minaj featuring J. Cole	Onika Maraj; Jermaine Cole; Jacob Canady; Derrick Miller; Ofer Ishai	Pink Friday 2	2023	
"Last Chance"	Nicki Minaj featuring Natasha Bedingfield	Andrew Theilk; Natasha Bedingfield; Onika Maraj	Pink Friday	2010	
"Lay It Down"	Lil Wayne featuring Nicki Minaj and Cory Gunz	Dwayne Carter; Onika Maraj; Peter Pankey, Jr. Ross Birchard; Lunice Pierre II	I Am Not a Human Being II (Deluxe edition)	2013	
"Letcha Go"	Nicki Minaj featuring Angel De-Mar	Nicki Minaj; J. Jackson; C. Loving; J. Smith	Playtime Is Over	2007	
"Letting Go (Dutty Love)" †	Sean Kingston featuring Nicki Minaj	Ester Dean; Kisean Anderson; Mikkel S. Eriksen; Onika Maraj; Tor Erik Hermansen; Traci Hale	Non-album single	2010	
"The Light Is Coming" #	Ariana Grande featuring Nicki Minaj	Pharrell Williams; Onika Maraj; Ariana Grande	Sweetener	2018	
"Light My Body Up" †	David Guetta featuring Nicki Minaj and Lil Wayne	David Guetta; Julien Martinez; Ester Dean; Onika Maraj; Nick van de Wall; Dwayne Carter; Kirill Slepukha; Danil Shilovskii	Non-album single	2017	
"Like a Star" †	Fetty Wap featuring Nicki Minaj	Fetty Wap; Nicki Minaj	Non-album single	2016	
"Likkle Miss" (Remix)	Nicki Minaj and Skeng	Onika Maraj; Kevon Douglas; Emelio Lynch; Rowan Melhado; Sebastian Loers	Queen Radio: Volume 1	2022	
"Lil Freak" †	Usher featuring Nicki Minaj	Elvis Williams; Ester Dean; Jamal Jones; Onika Maraj; Stevie Wonder	Raymond v. Raymond	2010	
"Livin' It Up"	Ciara featuring Nicki Minaj	Ciara Harris; Onika Maraj; Dernst "D'Mile" Emile II; Wynter Gordon; Kenneth Carter; Walter Carter; Dave Ferguson; William Hull; Curtis Reynolds; Keith Samuels; Brian Sherrer	Ciara	2013	
"LLC"	Nicki Minaj	Onika Maraj; Rasool Diaz; Wesley Dees; Jason Fox	Queen	2018	
"Lollipop Luxury" †	Jeffree Star featuring Nicki Minaj	Jeffree Star; Nico Hartikainen; Nicki Minaj	Beauty Killer	2011	
"Lookin Ass" †	Young Money featuring Nicki Minaj	Onika Maraj; Noel Fisher	Young Money: Rise of an Empire	2014	
"Love In The Way" †	BLEU and Nicki Minaj	Jeremy Biddle; Onika Maraj; Sam Tompkins; Dan Goudie; Ash Milton; Rug Wilson	Non-album single	2022	
"Love More" †	[[Chris Brown]] featuring Nicki Minaj	Chris Brown; Onika Maraj; Darrell Eversley; Howard Eversley; Shaun Spearman; Eric Bellinger; Verse Simmonds	X	2013	
"Low" †	Juicy J featuring Nicki Minaj, Lil Bibby and Young Thug	Jordan Houston; Onika Maraj; Brandon Dickinson; Lukasz Gottwald; Theron Thomas; Timothy Thomas; Henry Walter	Non-album single	2014	
"Majesty"	Nicki Minaj and Labrinth featuring Eminem	Onika Maraj; Timothy McKenzie; Marshall Mathers; Luis Resto	Queen	2018	
"Make Love" †	Gucci Mane and Nicki Minaj	Radric Davis; Joshua Luellen; Onika Maraj	Mr. Davis	2017	
"Make Me Proud" †	Drake featuring Nicki Minaj	Aubrey Graham; Nikhil Seetharam; Noah Shebib; Onika Maraj; Tyler Williams	Take Care	2011	
"Mama"	6ix9ine featuring Nicki Minaj and Kanye West	Daniel Hernandez; Andrew Green; Dexter Mills; Kanye West; Onika Maraj; Shane Lindstrom; Rasool Diaz	Dummy Boy	2018	
"Marilyn Monroe"	Nicki Minaj	Daniel James; J. R. Rotem; Leah Haywood; Onika Maraj; Ross Golan	Pink Friday: Roman Reloaded	2012	
"Masquerade"	Nicki Minaj	Benjamin Levin; Lukasz Gottwald; Max Martin; Onika Maraj; Henry Walter	Pink Friday: Roman Reloaded (Deluxe version)	2012	
"Massive Attack" †	Nicki Minaj featuring Sean Garrett	Onika Maraj; Sean Garrett; Alexander Grant	Non-album single	2010	
"Megatron" †	Nicki Minaj	Onika Maraj; Andrew Wansel; Brittany Chi Coney; Denisia "Blu June" Andrews; Haldane Wayne Browne	Non-album single	2019	
"Miami"	Nicki Minaj	Onika Maraj; Shane Lindstrom; Rasool Diaz; Douglas Patterson	Queen	2018	
"Milf"	Big Sean featuring Nicki Minaj and Juicy J	Sean Anderson; Ernest Clark; Marcos Palacios; Alexander Izquierdo; Onika Maraj; Jordan Houston; Rudy Moore	Hall of Fame	2013	
"Moment 4 Life" †	Nicki Minaj featuring Drake	Aubrey Graham; Onika Maraj; Nikhil Seetharam; Tyler Williams	Pink Friday	2010	
"Mona Lisa"	Nicki Minaj	Onika Maraj; Noel Fisher; Andre Proctor	The Pinkprint (Deluxe version)	2014	
"Monster" †	Kanye West featuring Jay-Z, Rick Ross, Bon Iver and Nicki Minaj	Justin Vernon; Kanye West; Onika Maraj; Shawn Carter; William Roberts	My Beautiful Dark Twisted Fantasy	2010	
"MotorSport" †	Migos, Nicki Minaj and Cardi B	Quavious Marshall; Kirsnick Ball; Kiari Cephus; Onika Maraj; Belcalis Almánzar; Shane Lindstrom; Tim Gomringer; Kevin Gomringer	Culture II	2017	
"Move Ya Hips" †	A$AP Ferg featuring Nicki Minaj and MadeinTYO	Darold Brown; Onika Maraj; Malcolm Davis; Frankie P	Floor Seats II	2020	
"Muny"	Nicki Minaj	Andrew Wansel; Joel Matthew Geddis; Makeba Riddick; Onika Maraj; Safaree Lloyd Samuels; Warren Felder	Pink Friday (Deluxe version)	2010	
"Muthafucka Up"	Tyga featuring Nicki Minaj	Micheal Stevenson; Jess Jackson; Onika Maraj	Careless World: Rise of the Last King	2012	
"My Chick Bad" †	Ludacris featuring Nicki Minaj	Christopher Bridges; Derrelle Davidson; Onika Maraj; Samuel Lindley	Battle of the Sexes	2010	
"My Nigga" (Remix) †	YG featuring Lil Wayne, Rich Homie Quan, Meek Mill and Nicki Minaj	Keenon Jackson; Dijon McFarlane; Mikely Adam; Jay Jenkins; Dequantes Lamar; Calvin Broadus; Awood Johnson; Craig Lawson; Corey Miller; Dwayne Carter; Onika Maraj; Robert Williams	My Krazy Life (Deluxe edition)	2014	
"Nice to Meet Ya" †	Meghan Trainor featuring Nicki Minaj	Meghan Trainor; Scott Friedman; Mark Williams; Raul Cubina; Onika Maraj	Treat Myself	2020	
"Nicki Minaj Speaks"	Nicki Minaj	Onika Miraj	Beam Me Up Scotty	2009	
"Nicki Minaj Speaks #2"	Nicki Minaj	Onika Miraj	Beam Me Up Scotty	2009	
"Nicki Minaj Speaks #3"	Nicki Minaj	Onika Miraj	Beam Me Up Scotty	2009	
"N.I.G.G.A.S."	Nicki Minaj featuring Angel De-Mar	Nicki Minaj; No I.D.	Playtime Is Over	2007	
"The Night Is Still Young" †	Nicki Minaj	Onika Maraj; Ester Dean; Lukasz Gottwald; Theron Thomas; Donnie Lewis; Henry Walter	The Pinkprint	2015	
"Nip Tuck"	Nicki Minaj	Onika Maraj; Brittany Hazzard; Jeremy Coleman; Daniel Johnson; June Nawakii	Queen	2018	
"Nobody"	DJ Khaled featuring Alicia Keys and Nicki Minaj	Khaled Khaled; Marcello Valenzano; Andre Lyon; Rayshon Cobbs, Jr. Alicia Cook; Onika Maraj; Thomas Lee Barrett	Grateful	2017	
"No Broken Hearts" †	Bebe Rexha featuring Nicki Minaj	Bleta Rexha; Onika Maraj; Jacob Kasher Hindlin; Koko LaRoo; Kgaugelo Nalane	Non-album single	2016	
"No Candle No Light" †	ZAYN featuring Nicki Minaj	Zayn Malik; Tushar Apte; Thomas John Routon; Brian D Lee; Denisia "Blu June" Andrews; Brittany "Chi" Coney; Katheryn Ostenberg	Icarus Falls	2018	
"No Flag" †	London on da Track featuring Nicki Minaj, 21 Savage and Offset	Roark Bailey; Aubrey Robinson; Offset; 21 Savage; Nicki Minaj	Non-album single	2017	
"No Flex Zone" (Remix) †	Rae Sremmurd featuring Nicki Minaj and Pusha T	Aaquil Brown; Khalif Brown; Michael Williams II; Asheton Hogan; Onika Maraj; Terrence Thornton	Non-album single	2014	
"No Frauds" †	Nicki Minaj, Drake and Lil Wayne	Onika Maraj; Aubrey Graham; Dwayne Carter; Brittany Hazzard; Shane Lindstrom; Tim Gomringer; Kevin Gomringer	Non-album single	2017	
"No Love" (Remix) †	August Alsina featuring Nicki Minaj	August Alsina; Christopher Gholson; Onika Maraj	Non-album single	2014	
"Not Sorry"	Rich the Kid featuring Nicki Minaj	Dimitri Roger; Onika Maraj; Samuel Jimenez; Derrick Milano	Boss Man	2020	
"Oh My Gawd" †	Mr Eazi and Major Lazer featuring Nicki Minaj and K4mo	Thomas Pentz; Fred Gibson; Anthony Kelly; Dave Kelly; Oluwatosin Oluwole Ajibade; Omogbolawon Ahmed Lawal; Onika Maraj	Music Is the Weapon	2020	
"Only" †	Nicki Minaj featuring Drake, Lil Wayne and Chris Brown	Onika Maraj; Aubrey Graham; Dwayne Carter; Jeremy Coleman; Lukasz Gottwald; Theron Thomas; Timothy Thomas; Henry Walter	The Pinkprint	2014	
"Out of My Mind" †	B.o.B featuring Nicki Minaj	Alexander Grant; Bobby Simmons, Jr. Clarence Montgomery III; Jamieson Jones; Jeremy Dussolliet; Justin Franks; Łukasz Gottwald; Mathieu Jomphe; Onika Maraj; Stephen Hill; Tim Sommers	Strange Clouds	2012	
"Pills N Potions" †	Nicki Minaj	Onika Maraj; Ester Dean; Lukasz Gottwald; Henry Walter	The Pinkprint	2014	
"Plain Jane" (Remix) †	A$AP Ferg featuring Nicki Minaj	Darold Brown; Kirlan Labarrie; Paul Beauregard; Jordan Houston; Onika Maraj	Non-album single	2017	
"Playtime Is Over"	Nicki Minaj	Nicki Minaj; Aliaune Thiam; Clifford Harris, Jr. Jose Cartagena; William Roberts II; Bryan Williams; Dwayne Carter; Nathaniel Hills; Khaled Khaled	Playtime Is Over	2007	
"Poke It Out"	Playboi Carti and Nicki Minaj	Jordan Carter; Onika Maraj; Jordan Jenks	Die Lit	2018	
"Pound the Alarm" †	Nicki Minaj	Onika Maraj; RedOne; Carl Falk; Rami Yacoub; Bilal Hajji; Achraf Jannusi	Pink Friday: Roman Reloaded	2012	
"The Power of Love" (Miura Keys Main Mix) †	Lotus & Gravy featuring Nicki Minaj	Peter Francis Michael Gill; William Johnson; Brian Philip Nash; Mark William O’Toole	Non-album single	2019	
"Put You in a Room"	Nicki Minaj	Onika Maraj; Andre Proctor; Rasool Diaz; Brian Soko; Noel Fisher	The Pinkprint (Deluxe version)	2014	
"Raining Men" †	Rihanna featuring Nicki Minaj	Melvin Hough II; Onika Maraj; Rivelino Wouter; Timothy Thomas; Theron Thomas	Loud	2010	
"Rake It Up" †	Yo Gotti and Mike WiLL Made-It featuring Nicki Minaj	Mario Mims; Michael Williams II; Onika Maraj	Gotti Made-It	2017	
"Realize"	2 Chainz featuring Nicki Minaj	Tauheed Epps; Trocon Roberts, Jr. Onika Maraj	Pretty Girls Like Trap Music	2017	
"Regret in Your Tears" †	Nicki Minaj	Onika Maraj; Brittany Hazzard; Matthew Samuels; Adam Feeney; Allen Ritter	Non-album single	2017	
"Regular Degular"	Nicki Minaj	Onika Maraj; Vincent Watson; Cory Martin	Queen (Target exclusive version)	2018	
"Rich Sex" #	Nicki Minaj featuring Lil Wayne	Onika Maraj; Dwayne Carter; Jeremy Reid; Jawara Headley; Aubry Delaine	Queen	2018	
"Right by My Side" †	Nicki Minaj featuring Chris Brown	Andrew Wansel; Eleanor Kate Jackson; Ester Dean; Jameel Roberts; Onika Maraj; Paul Bendict Landmaid; Ronald Colson; Warren Felder	Pink Friday: Roman Reloaded	2012	
"Right Thru Me" †	Nicki Minaj	Andrew Thielk; Joe Satriani; Onika Maraj	Pink Friday	2010	
"Roger That" †	Young Money	Dwayne Carter; Onika Maraj; Micheal Stevenson	We Are Young Money	2009	
"RNB"	Nicki Minaj featuring Lil Wayne and Tate Kobang	Onika Maraj; Dwayne Carter; Joshua Goods; Kendall Taylor; Tomislav Ratešić	Pink Friday 2	2023	
"Roman Holiday"	Nicki Minaj	Larry Nacht; Onika Maraj; Safaree Lloyd Samuels; Vincent Anthony Venditto; Winston Thomas	Pink Friday: Roman Reloaded	2012	
"Roman in Moscow" #	Nicki Minaj	Onika Maraj	Non-album single	2011	
"Roman Reloaded" #	Nicki Minaj featuring Lil Wayne	Dwayne Carter, Jr. Onika Maraj; Ricardo LaMarre; Safaree Lloyd Samuels; Willy Lamur	Pink Friday: Roman Reloaded	2012	
"Roman's Revenge" #	Nicki Minaj featuring Eminem	Kaseem Dean; Marshall Mathers; Onika Maraj; Trevor Smith	Pink Friday	2010	
"Roman's Revenge" (Remix) †	Nicki Minaj featuring Lil Wayne	Dwayne Carter; Kaseem Dean; Onika Maraj; Trevor Smith	Pink Friday (Bonus track)	2010	
"Run & Hide"	Nicki Minaj	Onika Maraj; Brittany Hazzard; Rupert Thomas Jr. Masamune Kudo	Queen	2018	
"Run Up" †	Major Lazer featuring PARTYNEXTDOOR and Nicki Minaj	Thomas Pentz; Tor Erik Hermansen; Mikkel Storleer Eriksen; Jahron Brathwaite; Onika Maraj; Phillip Meckseper	Music Is the Weapon	2017	
"Runnin"	Mike WiLL Made-It, A$AP Rocky, A$AP Ferg and Nicki Minaj	Michael Williams II; Asheton Hogan; Ludwig Göransson; Rakim Mayers; Onika Maraj; Darold Ferguson	Creed II: The Album	2018	
"Save Me"	Nicki Minaj	Andrew Wansel; Onika Maraj; Warren Felder	Pink Friday	2010	
"Say So" (Remix) †	Doja Cat featuring Nicki Minaj	Amala Zandile Dlamini; Onika Tanya Maraj-Petty; Lydia Asrat; Lukasz Gottwald; Yeti Beats	Hot Pink (Deluxe edition)	2020	
"Seeing Green"	Nicki Minaj with Drake and Lil Wayne	Andrew Maxwell Ramsey; Aubrey Graham; Carlos Broady; Dwayne Carter; Kimberly Jones; Nashiem Myrick; Onika Miraj; Shannon Sanders	Beam Me Up Scotty (2021 reissue)	2021	
"Senile"	Young Money featuring Tyga, Nicki Minaj and Lil Wayne	Micheal Stevenson; Onika Maraj; Dwayne Carter; David Lewis Doman	Young Money: Rise of an Empire	2014	
"Sex In Crazy Places"	Gucci Mane featuring Bobby V, Nicki Minaj and Trina	Radric Davis; Bobby Wilson; Onika Maraj; LaDamon Douglas; Katrina Taylor	The State vs. Radric Davis	2009	
"Sex in the Lounge"	Nicki Minaj featuring Lil Wayne and Bobby V	Dion Wilson; Dwayne Cater; Matthew Joshua Hall; Onika Maraj; Safaree Lloyd Samuels	Pink Friday: Roman Reloaded	2012	
"Shakin' It 4 Daddy"	Robin Thicke featuring Nicki Minaj	Robin Thicke; Ester Dean; Jamal Jones; Onika Maraj	Sex Therapy: The Session	2011	
"Shanghai"	Nicki Minaj	Onika Maraj; Robert V Sample; Steven Pugh; Chinza//Fly; Irvin Whitlow; Deshawn Kennedy; Christian Ward	The Pinkprint (Deluxe version)	2014	
"She Came to Give It to You" †	Usher featuring Nicki Minaj	Usher Raymond; Onika Maraj; Pharrell Williams	Hard II Love (Japanese edition)	2014	
"She For Keeps"	Quality Control, Quavo and Nicki Minaj	Shane Lindstrom; Quavious Marshall; Onika Maraj	Quality Control: Control the Streets Volume 1	2017	
"Shopaholic"	Nicki Minaj featuring Bobby V and Gucci Mane	Bobby Wilson; Christopher Gholson; Josheph Antney; Onika Miraj; Radric Davis	Beam Me Up Scotty	2009	
"Side to Side" †	Ariana Grande featuring Nicki Minaj	Onika Maraj; Max Martin; Savan Kotecha; Alexander Kronlund; Ilya Salmanzadeh; Ariana Grande	Dangerous Woman	2016	
"Silly"	Nicki Minaj featuring Bobby V and Gucci Mane	DeAndre Way; Derrick Crooms; Jonathan Dumas; Jonathan Wright; Michael Crooms; Onika Miraj; Victor Owusu	Beam Me Up Scotty	2009	
"Sir"	Nicki Minaj featuring Future	Onika Maraj; Nayvadius Wilburn; Leland Wayne; Xavier Dotson	Queen	2018	
"Skrt On Me"	Calvin Harris featuring Nicki Minaj	Adam Wiles; Onika Maraj; Brittany Hazzard	Funk Wav Bounces Vol. 1	2017	
"Slide Around"	Chance the Rapper featuring Lil Durk and Nicki Minaj	Chancellor J. Bennett; Durk Banks; Nate Fox; Onika Maraj; Pi'erre Bourne	The Big Day	2019	
"Slumber Party"	Nicki Minaj featuring Gucci Mane	Christopher Gholson; Onika Miraj; Radric Davis	Beam Me Up Scotty	2009	
"So Bad" †	Cam'ron featuring Nicki Minaj and Yummy Bingham	Cameron Giles; Onika Maraj	1st of the Month Vol. 2	2014	
"Somebody Else" †	Mario featuring Nicki Minaj	Jamal Jones; William Tyler; Jeremiah Bethea; Onika Maraj; Marvin E. Smith; Mario Barrett; Cory McWilliams	Non-album single	2013	
"Starships" †	Nicki Minaj	Carl Falk; Nadir Khayat; Onika Maraj; Rami Yacoub; Wayne Hector	Pink Friday: Roman Reloaded	2012	
"Sticks In My Bun"	Nicki Minaj	Nicki Minaj	Playtime Is Over	2007	
"Still I Rise"	Nicki Minaj	Clifford Harris; Floyd Hills; Marcella Araica; Onika Miraj	Beam Me Up Scotty	2009	
"Streets Is Watchin'"	Young Money	Dwayne Carter; Onika Maraj; Carl Lilly Jr. Jarvis Mills; Lavell Crump; Carl Watts	We Are Young Money	2009	
"Stupid Hoe" #	Nicki Minaj	Onika Maraj; Tina Dunham	Pink Friday: Roman Reloaded	2012	
"Sugar" (Remix) †	Maroon 5 featuring Nicki Minaj	Mike Posner; Adam Levine; Joshua Coleman; Lukasz Gottwald; Jacob Kasher Hindlin; Henry Walter; Onika Maraj	V (Japanese special edition)	2015	
"Suge" (Remix) †	DaBaby featuring Nicki Minaj	Jonathan Kirk; Tahj Morgan; Darryl Clemons; Nicki Minaj	Non-album single	2019	
"Sunshine '07"	Nicki Minaj featuring Gravy	Nicki Minaj; Shawn Carter; Daven "Prestige" Vanderpool; Daryl Barksdale; Bobby Robinson; Terry Lewis; James Harris III	Playtime Is Over	2007	
"Super Bass" †	Nicki Minaj	Daniel Johnson; Ester Dean; Onika Maraj; Roahn Hylton	Pink Friday (Deluxe version)	2010	
"Super Freaky Girl" †	Nicki Minaj	Onika Maraj; Gamal Lewis; Rick James; Alonzo Miller; Lukasz Gottwald; Aaron Joseph; Lauren Miller; Vaughn Oliver	Pink Friday 2	2022	
"Swalla" †	Jason Derulo featuring Nicki Minaj and Ty Dolla Sign	Jason Desrouleaux; Onika Maraj; Tyrone Griffin Jr. Eric Frederic; Gamal Lewis; Jacob Kasher Hindlin; Russell Jones; Robert Diggs	2Sides	2017	
"Swish Swish" †	Katy Perry featuring Nicki Minaj	Katy Perry; Duke Dumont; Sarah Hudson; PJ "Promnite" Sledge; Nicki Minaj; Brittany Hazzard	Witness	2017	
"Take It to the Head" †	DJ Khaled featuring Chris Brown, Rick Ross Nicki Minaj and Lil Wayne	Andre Davidson; Andrew Harr; Chris Brown; Dwayne Cater; Jermaine Jackson; Khaled Khaled, Onika Maraj; Sean Davison; William Roberts II	Kiss the Ring	2012	
"Tapout" †	Rich Gang featuring Lil Wayne, Birdman, Mack Maine, Nicki Minaj and Future	Dwayne Carter; Nayvadius Wilburn; Noel Fisher; Onika Maraj; Jermaine Preyan; Bryan Williams; Joshua Luellen; Bryan Simmons	Rich Gang	2013	
"Thought I Knew You"	Nicki Minaj featuring The Weeknd	Onika Maraj; Abel Tesfaye; Brittany Hazzard; Jeremy Reid	Queen	2018	
"Throw Sum Mo" †	Rae Sremmurd featuring Nicki Minaj and Young Thug	Aaquil Brown; Khalif Brown; Michael Williams II; Kenneth Coby; Jeremy Felton; Onika Maraj; Jeffery Williams	SremmLife	2014	
"Till the World Ends (The Femme Fatale Remix)" †	Britney Spears featuring Kesha and Nicki Minaj	Alexander Kronlund; Kesha Sebert; Lukasz Gottwald; Max Martin; Onika Maraj	Non-album single	2011	
"Tonight I'm Getting Over You" (Remix) †	Carly Rae Jepsen featuring Nicki Minaj	Carly Rae Jepsen; Clarence Coffee Jr., Katerina Loules; Lukas Loules; Max Martin; Onika Maraj; Shiloh	Non-album single	2013	
"Touch Down" (Remix) †	Stylo G and The FaNaTiX featuring Nicki Minaj and Vybz Kartel	Curtis James; Adrian Francis; Mark Waxkirsh; Stylo G Vybz Kartel; Nicki Minaj	Non-album single	2018	
"Touchin, Lovin" †	Trey Songz featuring Nicki Minaj	Tremaine Neverson; Onika Maraj; Frank Brim; Kevin Ross; William Featherstone; Matthew Featherstone; Justin Featherstone; Christopher Featherstone; Sean Combs; Daron Jones; Robert Kelly; Christopher Wallace	Trigga	2014	
"Transformer"	Future featuring Nicki Minaj	Nayvadius Wilburn; Onika Maraj; Jacob Canady	Wrld on Drugs	2018	
"Trini Dem Girls" †	Nicki Minaj featuring LunchMoney Lewis	Onika Maraj; Jeremy Coleman; Lukasz Gottwald; Jacob Kasher Hindlin; Gamal Lewis; Theron Thomas; Alexander Castillo Vasquez; Henry Walter	The Pinkprint	2014	
"Trollz" †	6ix9ine and Nicki Minaj	Daniel Hernandez; Onika Maraj; Aaron Clarke; Jahnei Clarke; Jeremiah Raisen	TattleTales	2020	
"True Colors"	Wiz Khalifa featuring Nicki Minaj	Cameron Thomaz; Daniel Johnson; Jeremy Coleman; Luca Polizzi; Brian Soko; Andre Proctor; Rasool Diaz; Onika Maraj	Blacc Hollywood	2014	
"Truffle Butter" †	Nicki Minaj featuring Drake and Lil Wayne	Onika Maraj; Aubrey Graham; Dwayne Carter; Paul Jefferies; Maya Jane Coles	The Pinkprint	2014	
"Turn Me On" †	David Guetta featuring Nicki Minaj	David Guetta; Ester Dean; Giorgio Tuinfort; Onika Maraj	Nothing but the Beat and Pink Friday: Roman Reloaded (Deluxe version)	2011	
"Tusa" †	KAROL G and Nicki Minaj	Carolina Giraldo Navarro; Onika Maraj; Daniel Echavarría; Kevyn Mauricio Cruz Moreno	KG0516	2019	
"#Twerkit" †	Busta Rhymes featuring Nicki Minaj	Pharrell Williams; Trevor Tahiem Smith, Jr. Onika Maraj	Non-album single	2013	
"Up All Night"	Drake featuring Nicki Minaj	Aubrey Graham; Matthew Burnett; Matthew Samuels; Onika Maraj	Thank Me Later	2010	
"Up in Flames"	Nicki Minaj	Onika Maraj; Stephen Kozmeniuk; Matthew Samuels; Brett Ryan Kruger; Zale Epstein	Pink Friday: Roman Reloaded – The Re-Up	2012	
"Up Out My Face" (Remix) †	Mariah Carey featuring Nicki Minaj	Christopher Stewart; Mariah Carey; Onika Maraj; Terius Nash	Angels Advocate	2010	
"Va Va Voom" †	Nicki Minaj	Onika Maraj; Lukasz Gottwald; Allan Grigg; Max Martin; Henry Walter	Pink Friday: Roman Reloaded (Deluxe version) and Pink Friday: Roman Reloaded – The Re-Up	2012	
"Wamables"	Nicki Minaj	Onika Maraj; Andre Proctor; Rasool Diaz; Brian Soko; Noel Fisher; Francisco "Frankie" Ramirez	The Pinkprint (Deluxe version)	2014	
"Want Some More"	Nicki Minaj	Onika Maraj; Jeremih Felton; Xavier Dotson; Christian Ward; Leland Wayne	The Pinkprint	2014	
"Warning"	Nicki Minaj	Nicki Minaj; Christopher Wallace; Osten Harvey	Playtime Is Over	2007	
"Wave Ya Hand"	Nicki Minaj	Kaseem Dean; Onika Maraj	Pink Friday (Bonus track)	2010	
"The Way Life Goes" (Remix) †	Lil Uzi Vert featuring Nicki Minaj	Symere Woods; Ike Smith; Onika Maraj	Non-album single	2017	
"We Go Up" †	Nicki Minaj featuring Fivio Foreign	Onika Maraj; Maxie Ryles III; Anthony Woart, Jr. Konrad Zasada; Szymon Swiatczak; Joshua Goods	Non-album single	2022	
"Welcome to the Party" (Remix) †	Pop Smoke featuring Nicki Minaj	Bashar Jackson; Andre Loblack; Onika Maraj	Meet the Woo (Deluxe edition)	2019	
"What That Speed Bout!?" †	Mike WiLL Made-It, Nicki Minaj and YoungBoy Never Broke Again	Michael Williams II; Onika Maraj; Kentrell Gaulden; Kevin Gomringer; Tim Gomringer; Samuel Gloade	Non-album single	2020	
"What's Wrong With Them"	Lil Wayne featuring Nicki Minaj	Dwayne Carter; Onika Maraj; Bigram Zayas	I Am Not a Human Being	2010	
"Where Them Girls At" †	David Guetta featuring Flo Rida and Nicki Minaj	David Guetta; Giorgio Tuinfort; Jared Cotter; Juan Silinas; Michael Caren; Tramar Dillard; Onika Maraj; Oscar Silinas; Sandy Wilhelm	Nothing but the Beat	2011	
"Whip It"	Nicki Minaj	Achraf Jannusi; Alex Papaconstantinou; Bilal Hajji; Nadir Khayat; Onika Maraj; Wayne Hector	Pink Friday: Roman Reloaded	2012	
"Whole Lotta Choppas" (Remix) †	Sada Baby featuring Nicki Minaj	Casada Sorrell; Nicki Minaj; Marcus Black; Cecil Glenn; Stephen Gibson	Non-album single	2020	
"Whole Lotta Money" (Remix) †	Bia & Nicki Minaj	Bianca Landrau; Onika Maraj; London Jae; Rodrick Doss Jr. Tee Romano	For Certain (Deluxe version)	2021	
"Win Again"	Nicki Minaj	Onika Maraj; Shama Joseph; Lasanna Harris	The Pinkprint (Deluxe version)	2014	
"Wobble Up" †	Chris Brown featuring Nicki Minaj and G-Eazy	Christopher Brown; Jonathan Rotem; Onika Maraj; Theron Thomas; Gerald Gillum; Renetta Lowe; Byron Thomas; Billie Calvin	Indigo	2019	
"Woman Like Me" †	Little Mix featuring Nicki Minaj	Jessica Glynne; Edward Sheeran; Steve McCutcheon	LM5	2018	
"Woohoo" †	Christina Aguilera featuring Nicki Minaj	Christina Aguilera; Claude Kelly; Ester Dean; Onika Maraj; Jamal Jones	Bionic	2010	
"Wuchoo Know"	Nicki Minaj	Nicki Minaj; James "Groove" Chambers; Niatia Kirkland	Playtime Is Over	2007	
"Ya Lil" †	Ramage featuring Nicki Minaj	Ramage; MAZ; Abo-Z; Latino; Martin Adium Sinotte; Mohamed Yehia; Sari Abboud; Carl Austin Rosen; Louis Bell; Leland Wayne; Adam Feeney; Onika Maraj	Al Anesa Farah – Music from the Original TV Series	2019	
"Yasss Bish" #	Nicki Minaj featuring Soulja Boy	Onika Maraj	Non-album single	2014	
"Yikes" #	Nicki Minaj	Onika Maraj; Bobby Barrett; Darryl Clemons; Derrick Milano	Non-album single	2020	
"YM Salute"	Lil Wayne featuring Lil Twist, Lil Chuckee, Gudda Gudda, Jae Millz and Nicki Minaj	Dwayne Carter; Daen Simmons; Onika Maraj; Christopher Moore; Carl Lilly; Jarvis Mills; Rashad Ballard	I Am Not a Human Being	2010	
"You Already Know" †	Fergie featuring Nicki Minaj	Fergie Duhamel; William Adams; Onika Maraj; James Brown; Antonio Hardy	Double Dutchess	2017	
"You da Baddest" †	Future featuring Nicki Minaj	Nayvadius Wilburn; Onika Maraj; Noel Fisher; Andre Price	Hndrxx	2017	
"Young Forever"	Nicki Minaj	Henry Walter; Kelly Sheehan; Lukasz Gottwald; Onika Maraj	Pink Friday: Roman Reloaded	2012	
"Your Love" †	Nicki Minaj	Andrew Wansel; David Freeman; Joseph Hughes; Onika Maraj	Pink Friday	2010	
"You the Boss" †	Rick Ross featuring Nicki Minaj	Kevin Erondu; Onika Maraj; William Leonard Roberts II	Non-album single	2011	
"Y.U. Mad" †	Birdman featuring Lil Wayne and Nicki Minaj	Bryan Williams; Dwayne Carter; Jeremy Coleman; Onika Maraj; Todd Tolkoff	Bigga Than Life	2011	
"Zanies and Fools"	Chance the Rapper featuring Darius Scott and Nicki Minaj	Carter Lang; Chancellor J. Bennett; Darius Scott; Dwayne Verner, Jr. Greg Landfair; Nate Fox; Nico Segal; Onika Maraj; Oscar Hammerstein II; Peter Wilkins; Richard Rodgers	The Big Day	2019	

== Unreleased songs ==
Song	Artist(s)	Originating Album	Leak	Ref(s)	
"Ain’t Gone Do It"	Nicki Minaj featuring Tayla Parx	Nicki Minaj	The Pinkprint	Yes	<
"Big Barbie"	Nicki Minaj	Nicki Minaj	Queen	No	<
"Dem Boyz"	Nicki Minaj	Nicki Minaj	The Pinkprint	No	<
"Good Luck"	Nicki Minaj	Nicki Minaj	The Pinkprint	Yes	<
"New Body"	Kanye West featuring Ty Dolla Sign and Nicki Minaj	Unknown	Yandhi	Yes	<
"Oh My"	Nicki Minaj	Nicki Minaj	Unknown	No	<
"Sorry"	Nicki Minaj featuring Nas	Nicki Minaj	Queen	Yes	<

== See also ==
- Nicki Minaj discography
