= Extravagance =

Extravagance may refer to:

- Extravagance (1916 film), an American film
- Extravagance (1919 film), an American lost film
- Extravagance (1921 film), an American silent film directed by Phil Rosen
- Extravagance (1930 film), a 1930 American romantic drama directed by Phil Rosen

== See also ==
- Tryphé, extravagance in Roman antiquity
- "Extravagant", a song by Lil Durk
