= Boss Ass Bitch =

Single by PTAF

Single by PTAF

from the EP 3 The Hard Way
- Released: November 6, 2013
- Recorded: 2012
- Genre: Hip hop; rap; comedy hip hop; comedy rap
- Length: 3:34
- Label: DeRe
- Songwriters: Keyona Reed; Shontel Moore; Kandise Nathan; Eric Tandoc
- Producer: LadyTinyFameSix

PTAF singles chronology
"Boss Ass Bitch" (2013)	"Do Yo Shit" (2014)

Music video
- "Boss Boss Chick" on YouTube

"Boss Ass Bitch" (edited for radio as "Boss Boss Chick") is a song by American hip hop girl group PTAF. It was first released on May 6, 2012 as a music video on YouTube, following which it went viral online in 2013. The song was also remixed by rapper Nicki Minaj.

== Background ==
In 2012, PTAF made the song when they were students at Crenshaw High School. It was originally targeted at a girl in their school and titled "I Don't Like That Bitch", and the video was filmed at the school. At the time, they made music with the help of a man who would come after school every week for the purpose. One afternoon, K'Duce was beating on a desk when she yelled "boss ass bitch", which inspired the song. Soon, the trio recorded their verses and shot its video. K-Duce and Alizé stated that the title of the song has a different meaning from being "bossy" and refers to them "bossing up to our responsibilities."

The video that PTAF made for the song was used in many Vine videos, leading to the song becoming popular in the summer of 2013 and being played on radio. The song was released to streaming services on November 6, 2013 and served as the lead single from their EP 3 The Hard Way (2014). The success of the song led to PTAF signing to Capitol Records.

== Music video ==
A music video for the song was directed by Lil Chris and released on March 30, 2014. It sees PTAF walking around town and eating cereal.

== In popular culture ==
The 2015 film The Bronze features a version of "Boss Ass Bitch" during the closing credits, titled "F That!" and performed by American actress Melissa Rauch.

== Charts ==
Chart performance for "Boss Ass Bitch"
Chart (2021)	Peak position
US Bubbling Under Hot 100 (Billboard)	16

== Nicki Minaj remix ==
"Boss Ass Bitch (Remix)"

Song by PTAF with Nicki Minaj

from the album Beam Me Up Scotty
- Released: May 14, 2021
- Genre: Hip-hop
- Length: 4:08
- Label: Young Money; Aphilliates; Republic Records
- Songwriters: Onika Maraj; Kandise Nathan; Shontel Moore; Keyona Reed
- Producers: DJ Holiday; The Trap-a-Holics

On December 30, 2013, rapper Nicki Minaj released an unofficial remix of the song. In this freestyle, she raps aggressively about her way of handling disrespectful women, sharing three rules. Her lyrics consist of sex-related matters and boasts directed at her rivals. Toward the end, she sings in a haunting manner, "When I'm back on the prowl, you bitches better have my money, 'cause I'm coming for you". She ends the song with orders to ask rappers Lil Wayne and Birdman "who the five-star bitch is".

PTAF had not been asked permission for the use of the song's beat. Kandii said in regard to Minaj, "I thought she could have tried harder to contact us. I guess for her, putting out the song was a way of trying to get in contact with us. I thought she was complimenting us and getting us out there."

Minaj's remix was included in Pitchfork's list "The 100 Best Tracks of 2014".
