= Sucka Free =

Mixtape by Nicki Minaj
- Released: April 12, 2008
- Recorded: 2007–2008
- Genre: Hip hop
- Length: 56:25
- Labels: Young Money; Dirty Money
- Producer: Lil Wayne

Nicki Minaj chronology
Playtime Is Over (2007)	Sucka Free (2008)	Beam Me Up Scotty (2009)

Sucka Free is the second mixtape by New York–based rapper Nicki Minaj. It was released on April 12, 2008, by Dirty Money Records. Sucka Free features guest appearances from fellow rappers Lil Wayne, Gucci Mane, Jadakiss, Lil' Kim and Ransom. Production derives from Daven "Prestige" Vanderpool, Diddy, James Todd Smith, among others.

== Background ==
Just after Minaj's previous mixtape, Playtime Is Over, was released in 2007, Minaj released Sucka Free with label mate Lil Wayne after he discovered her on the Queens-made DVD series called The Come Up.

In a promotional photo for the mixtape, Minaj's pose paid homage to a photoshoot from rapper Lil' Kim's debut album, Hard Core, causing Kim to express anger on Twitter. Despite Minaj calling Kim an "influence" early in her career, tensions rose between the two with Kim calling Minaj "catty" and accused her of copying her image saying, "If you are going to steal my swag, you gonna have to pay. Something gotta give. You help me, I help you. That's how it goes to me." Minaj later commented on the situation in an interview with The Angie Martinez Show, saying "She picked a fight with Foxy, then she picked a fight with Eve, then she picked a fight with Remy, then it was Mrs. Wallace, then it was Nicki Minaj. Every time you in the news, it's 'cause you gettin' at somebody. Where's your music? Put your music out, and when I see your name on Billboard, that's when I'll respond to you."

== Critical reception ==
In a 2014 article, NME described the mixtape as Minaj's bang "on the door of hip-hop's boys club" and was described as "explosive". Although Minaj jumped on a "load of popular hip hop instrumentals", she successfully made every track feel like her own.

Minaj's remix of Eminem and The Notorious B.I.G.'s "Dead Wrong" was seen as a standout track from the mixtape which called in "comparisons to NYC rap legends like Notorious" and eventually continued by Minaj in her third studio album, The Pinkprint, on songs such as "Four Door Aventador". The song was also called a "triumph and an omen" in a Paper Magazine article, but that it was hardly comparable to Minaj's fourth studio album, Queen. With high praise response from critics, Minaj won an award for Female Artist of the Year at the 2008 Underground Music Awards.

=== Accolades ===
Year	Nominee / work	Award	Result
2008	Nicki Minaj	Female Artist of the Year	Won

== Commercial performance ==
The mixtape debuted at number 95 on Billboard's Top R&B/Hip-Hop Albums, making it Minaj's first mixtape to chart.

== Track listing ==
No.	Title	Sample(s)	Length
1.	"President Carter Speaks"		1:09
2.	"Sunshine" (featuring Lil Wayne)	"(Always Be My) Sunshine" by Jay-Z featuring Foxy Brown and Babyface	3:18
3.	"Set It Off"	"Set It Off" by N.O.R.E. featuring Swizz Beatz and J. Ru$$	2:15
4.	"Brraaattt" (featuring Ransom)	"Buck Buck" by Red Café and DJ Envy featuring Sheek Louch	2:43
5.	"Higher Than a Kite" (featuring Lil Wayne)	"My Swag" by T.I. featuring Wyclef Jean	2:35
6.	"Grindin"	"Grindin'" by Clipse	2:20
7.	"Curious George"	"730" by Foxy Brown	2:02
8.	"Sucka Free ‘08"		0:07
9.	"Baddest Bitch"	"Single Again" by Trina	2:19
10.	"Wanna Minaj?" (featuring Gucci Mane and Lil' Kim)	"Freaky Gurl" (Remix) by Gucci Mane featuring Lil' Kim & Ludacris	3:39
11.	"Doin It Well" (featuring Jadakiss)	"Doin' It" by LL Cool J	2:23
12.	"Cuchi Shop"	"Coffee Shop" by Yung Joc featuring Gorilla Zoe	3:11
13.	"Hundred Million Dollaz"		0:19
14.	"Young Money Ballaz" (featuring Lil Wayne)	"Roc-A-Fella Billionaires" by Freeway featuring Jay-Z	2:38
15.	"Sweetest Girl"	"Sweetest Girl (Dollar Bill)" by Wyclef Jean featuring Akon and Lil Wayne	3:04
16.	"Firm Biz '08" (featuring Jadakiss)	"Firm Biz" by The Firm featuring Dawn Robinson	1:37
17.	"Dead Wrong"	"Dead Wrong" by The Notorious B.I.G.	2:46
18.	"Long Time Comin'" (featuring Ransom)	"Suga Duga" by Dipset featuring Cam'ron	3:16
19.	"Womp Womp"	"Pussy MVP" by Lil Wayne featuring Jay Bezel and Hot Rod	2:34
20.	"Who's Ya Best MC?"		2:27
21.	"Autobiography"	"Feel It In the Air" by Beanie Sigel featuring Melissa	4:33
22.	"President Carter Signs Off"		0:16
23.	"Lollipop (Remix)"	"Lollipop" by Lil Wayne	5:42

== Charts ==
Chart (2010)	Peak position
US Top R&B/Hip-Hop Albums	95
