= Beam Me Up Scotty (mixtape) =

- Original cover

Mixtape by Nicki Minaj
- Released: April 18, 2009
- Genre: Hip-hop
- Length: 75:18
- Labels: Young Money (original); Republic (reissue)

Nicki Minaj chronology
Sucka Free (2008)	Beam Me Up Scotty (2009)	Pink Friday (2010)

Beam Me Up Scotty is the third mixtape by the Trinidadian rapper and singer Nicki Minaj, released on April 18, 2009, in association with Young Money. It features guest appearances from rappers Brinx, Busta Rhymes, Drake, Gucci Mane, Mack Maine, Gudda Gudda, Jae Millz, Lil Wayne, Red Café, Rocko and Ron Browz, as well as vocals from singers Ricky Blaze, Bobby V, Shanell. The mixtape received favourable reviews from music critics, and is also largely credited with establishing Minaj's fan base.

Minaj reissued Beam Me Up Scotty on May 14, 2021, via Republic Records, with four bonus tracks: "Seeing Green" with Drake and Lil Wayne, "Fractions", a remix of "Crocodile Teeth" with Skillibeng, and a remix of "Boss Ass Bitch" with PTAF. It debuted at number two on the Billboard 200, making it the highest-charting re-released mixtape by a rapper and the highest-debuting mixtape by a female rapper in history. Four tracks of the reissue charted on the Billboard Hot 100, the highest-charting being "Seeing Green", which debuted at number 12.

== Background ==
In 2006, Minaj signed to Fendi's Brooklyn production company Dirty Money Entertainment. She released her first mixtape Playtime Is Over (2007) and filmed a music video for the track "Click Clack", which was featured on the underground rap DVD The Come Up Vol. 11. Her rap on the DVD caught the attention of rapper Lil Wayne, who contacted Fendi to set up a call with Minaj and asked her to join the crew he was assembling for his new imprint called Young Money. Minaj did not sign a contract with Young Money then. Lil Wayne featured on her mixtapes and was credited as a mentor to Minaj when she recorded her 2008 mixtape Sucka Free and Beam Me Up Scotty. She sold her mixtapes from her car, booked shows and communicated with her fanbase on social media.

Minaj and her manager Debra Antney executive produced Beam Me Up Scotty. Minaj said that with the previous mixtapes much of the attention was focused on her image, and with Beam Me Up Scotty she made sure the focus would be on her work. She added that being part of the I Am Music Tour made her more "hungry" and inspired her while making the mixtape.

Minaj's mixtapes, freestyles, and features on other artists' songs garnered significant industry and public interest.

== Promotion ==
A music video for the song "Itty Bitty Piggy" was released for the song due to popular demand. The video is shots of Nicki performing the song live at a club concert and behind the scenes of the Beam Me Up Scotty photo shoot. The video was premiered on Hoodaffairs on Demand who also had a part in shooting the clip. "Go Hard", featuring Lil Wayne, was promoted with a music video shot by director Koach K. Rich.

== Critical reception ==
Professional ratings
Review scores
Source	Rating
AllMusic	4.5/5 stars
MSN Music (Expert Witness)	A−
PopMatters	8/10

Beam Me Up Scotty was well received by critics and fans alike receiving an average score of 78. MTV's Mixtape Daily chose Beam Me Up Scotty as its weekly pick on May 4, 2009, giving the album positive reviews: "Yeah, you are going to hear a bunch of more-than-just-friendly shout-outs to the ladies – Nicki says she loves the girls and has no problem surrounding herself with "bad bitches." Mixtape Daily favored tracks such as "I Get Crazy", "Kill the DJ" & "Envy". Beam Me Up Scotty is credited with helping distinguish Minaj as a popular female figure in a male-dominated genre.

BET.com's SoundOff TV gave Minaj a positive review on her mixtape while commenting on impressions of Minaj herself: "I'm not going to front, when Nicki first hit my 'new rapper radar' I immediately hit the 'I'll pass' button since the parallels between her and Lil' Kim were extremely similar. Light skin cutie with long hair rapping about explicit issues we only talk about behind closed doors – yeah, I'd say she was a carbon copy. But after removing the stubborn sticker from my forehead, I sat down and dissected shorty's material and the parallels didn't exist like I once thought."

Writing for MSN Music in 2011, critic Robert Christgau identified Beam Me Up Scotty as the release that convinced "hards" that Minaj "was street enough", noting her "highly unsisterly, rabidly materialistic" persona on the mixtape. According to Rob Molster of The Cavalier Daily, Beam Me Up Scotty "garnered [Minaj] a reputation for delivering vicious lyrics with a fresh style...[and] also revealed Minaj to have a knack for invoking alternative personalities, adding another layer to her already complex persona." The recording is credited with helping to create Minaj's fanbase. Shortly after its release, Minaj, along with other Cash Money/Young Money artists, appeared on MTV.com's Mixtape Daily to discuss the recording.

=== Retrospective analysis ===
In Beam Me Up Scotty, there are early signs of the relevance and empire Minaj would build in the upcoming years. She is prophetizing it all over the record, displaying her determination in tracks like "Gotta Go Hard", but also disclosing her vulnerable side in "Can Anybody Hear Me?" and "Still I Rise" [...] Never had the lines between rapping and singing been blurrier, and never had melodic vocals been more important for hip-hop.

— PopMatters writer Ana Clara Ribeiro on Beam Me Up Scotty

In a 2021 review of the mixtape's reissue, The Daily Californian writer Kelly Nguyen noted that back in 2009 when the tape was first released, "Minaj's rise as ruler of rap was sensational" and that her "clear talent was matched with her copious charisma—all wrapped up in the bait-and-switch of her personas". She added that the "nostalgia of Minaj's throwback mixtape is the reason why the album's release reignited Barbz and TikTok youth to stream it". She went on to say that beginning from this album, Minaj went "full throttle into a vertiginous verse that's built to make you feel like a Barbie-level boss. But then she's casual and carefree [...] It's how she's stayed relevant since the age of Justin Bieber prepuberty bowl cuts and Kanye's MTV VMA coup d’état. As much as the world tried to pare her down to its level, she chewed it up and spit it out, just to repeat the process on the next verse."

Complex writer Trace William Cowen also noted that "fans and industry watchers alike have pointed to the unique circumstances surrounding" the album's number two debut, "commending Minaj for bagging such a strong opening week with a project that's effectively (new cuts aside) a little over 12 years old". In an analysis of the reissue, PopMatters writer Ana Clara Ribeiro stated that "Minaj might not have been a pioneer of women in rap" but it also does not "make sense anymore to describe her as a 'female rapper' when she is one of the best alive and a serious candidate to best of all time". Rolling Stone writer Mankaprr Conteh stated that with the re-release, Minaj revisited a "distant golden age". He went on to say that Minaj's ascent with the mixtape "came as rap made by women seemed to be on the decline. The number of women signed to major labels reportedly went from more than 40 to just three between the late eighties and 2010; after her arrival, Minaj became a singular figure in music for almost a decade". He went on to say that this mixtape "paved the way for that accomplishment". On the mixtape content, he stated Minaj "brought a more down to earth humanity to her persona with revealing spoken interludes". Conteh went on to say that,

"Twelve years after Beam Me Up Scotty, there are many more women making popular rap music and there's no doubt that Nicki Minaj's success has inspired the variety and competition that exists now [...] Women across rap explore the contours of their voices, building on a framework established by [Minaj]. They complement their raps with delicate singing. They have tapped into her over-the-top wardrobe and wigs. Many came up remaking [Minaj's] songs and at their most fortunate, they've been able to collaborate with her".

== Commercial performance ==
In 2009, "I Get Crazy" charted at number 20 on the US Hot Rap Songs chart and number 37 on the Hot R&B/Hip-Hop Songs chart. The 2021 reissue of the mixtape debuted at number two on the Billboard 200, selling 80,000 copies in its first week. It became the "highest-charting re-released mixtape by a rapper and the highest-debuting female rap mixtape in history". The opening track of the reissue, "Seeing Green", debuted at number 12 on the Billboard Hot 100 and ranked as the week's best-selling song in pure sales. "Fractions" debuted at number 52, "Itty Bitty Piggy" at 82, and "Crocodile Teeth" at 100. With three new entries on the Hot R&B/Hip-Hop Songs chart, Minaj extended her record as the female artist with the most songs charted. She also surpassed Janet Jackson as the woman with the second-most songs to reach the top 10 of the chart, with "Seeing Green" debuting at number 8.

== 2021 reissue ==
On May 11, 2021 after a three-month hiatus from social media, Minaj shared a series of pictures on Instagram teasing the release of music on Friday, May 14th. She confirmed the release of music on Instagram Live confirming that Beam Me Up Scotty would be released "on major streaming services, and would include a fresh track" called "Seeing Green" featuring rappers Drake and Lil Wayne. Drake also joined the broadcast saying,

"It didn't feel right, you not being on it. Nobody does this shit better than you. We miss your presence, we miss your bars".

On May 14, 2021, Minaj re-released the mixtape on all streaming services along with a new cover and three new songs. Billboard described the new mixtape artwork as Minaj going "full-retro for the revamped Star Trek-themed artwork".

In 2021, as she teased the reissue of the mixtape, Minaj posted a picture of herself wearing hot pink Croc shoes. According to Billboard and The Sole Supplier, "the look caused a whopping 4,900% spike in sales of pink Crocs and the retailer's website also crashed."

In addition to "Seeing Green", the reissue includes two new tracks titled "Fractions" and a remix of "Crocodile Teeth" with Skillibeng. The mixtape also included her 2014 tracks "Chi-Raq" and "Boss Ass Bitch" with G Herbo and PTAF respectively. The 2009 mixtape was also included but several tracks did not make the final cut due to sampling issues including: "I Feel Free," "Mind on My Money," "Handstand," "Five-O" and "Outro."

== Track listing ==
Beam Me Up Scotty track listing
No.	Title	Sample(s)	Length
1.	"Intro"		1:04
2.	"I Get Crazy" (featuring Lil Wayne)		3:41
3.	"Itty Bitty Piggy"	"Donk" by Soulja Boy Tellem	4:07
4.	"Kill da DJ"		3:01
5.	"Mind on My Money" (featuring Brinx and Busta Rhymes)	"Live Your Life" by T.I. featuring Rihanna	4:31
6.	"Nicki Minaj Speaks"		0:19
7.	"Slumber Party" (featuring Gucci Mane)		3:30
8.	"Shopaholic" (featuring Bobby Valentino, Gucci Mane, Sandman, and Lil Joe)		5:32
9.	"Go Hard" (featuring Lil Wayne)	"Go Hard" by DJ Khaled featuring Kanye West and T-Pain	5:56
10.	"Nicki Minaj Speaks"		1:12
11.	"Best I Ever Had" (featuring Drake)	Best I Ever Had by Drake	5:26
12.	"Handstand" (featuring Shanell)		3:08
13.	"Keys Under Palm Trees"		2:51
14.	"Silly"	"Get Silly" by V.I.C.	1:30
15.	"Easy" (featuring Gucci Mane and Rocko)		4:05
16.	"Five-O" (featuring Jae Millz and Gudda Gudda)		4:18
17.	"Nicki Minaj Speaks"		0:53
18.	"Envy"		3:43
19.	"Can Anybody Hear Me"		3:26
20.	"Still I Rise"	"No Matter What" by T.I.	3:09
21.	"I Feel Free" (featuring Ron Browz, Red Café, and Ricky Blaze)		4:32
22.	"Outro"		1:39
23.	"Beam Me Up Scotty"	"Kill the Bitch" by Sasha	3:59
Total length:			66:00

2021 reissue track listing
No.	Title	Writer(s)	Sample(s)	Length
1.	"Seeing Green" (with Drake and Lil Wayne)	Onika Maraj; Aubrey Graham; Dwayne Carter; Kaushik Barua; Nile Goveia; Oliver El-Khatib; Andrew Maxwell Ramsey; Shannon Sanders; Kimberly Jones; Carlos Broady; Nashiem Myrick	"In My Mind" by Heather Headley	5:39
2.	"Fractions"	Maraj; Joshua Goods; Kendall Taylor; Norman Whitfield; Derrick Milano	"Where I'm From" by Jay-Z	3:01
3.	"Crocodile Teeth" (with Skillibeng) (Remix)	Maraj; Emwah Warmington; Andreas Olov Nilsson; John Scilipoti		3:37
4.	"Chi-Raq" (with G Herbo)	Maraj; Herbert Wright III; Matthew Samuels; Anderson Hernandez; Allen Ritter		3:51
5.	"Boss Ass Bitch" (with PTAF) (remix)	Maraj; Kandise Nathan; Shontel Moore; Keyona Reed		4:08
6.	"Intro"	Maraj		1:03
7.	"Itty Bitty Piggy"	Maraj; DeAndre Way	"Donk" by Soulja Boy Tellem	4:06
8.	"I Get Crazy" (featuring Lil Wayne)	Maraj; Carter; Desmond Ryan; Rondell Turner		3:40
9.	"Kill da DJ"	Maraj; Turner		3:01
10.	"Nicki Minaj Speaks"	Maraj		0:19
11.	"Slumber Party" (featuring Gucci Mane)	Maraj; Radric Delantic Davis; Christopher Gholson		3:30
12.	"Shopaholic" (featuring Gucci Mane, Bobby V and F1JO)	Maraj; Davis; Gholson; Bobby Wildson; Joseph "F1Jo" Antney		5:32
13.	"Gotta Go Hard" (featuring Lil Wayne)	Andrew Harr; Jermaine Jackson; Khaled Khaled; Faheem Najm; Kanye West; Jasper Cameron; Ciara Harris; Jamal Jones; Elvis Williams	"Go Hard" by DJ Khaled featuring Kanye West and T-Pain	5:55
14.	"Nicki Minaj Speaks #2"	Maraj		1:09
15.	"Best I Ever Had Remix" (with Drake)	Maraj; Graham; Carter; Nakia Coleman; Samuels; Ann Marie Hamilton; Dan Hamilton		5:25
16.	"Keys Under Palm Trees"	Maraj; Gerrit Wessendorf; Thomas Kessler		2:50
17.	"Silly"	Maraj; Derrick Crooms; Michael Crooms; Jonathan Dumas; Victor Owusu; Way; Jonathan Wright	"Get Silly" by V.I.C.	1:30
18.	"Easy" (featuring Gucci Mane and Rocko)	Maraj; Davis; Rodney Hill Jr.; Xavier Dotson		4:05
19.	"Nicki Minaj Speaks #3"	Maraj		0:52
20.	"Envy"	Maraj; Jonathan Joyner; Jahmon Pauling		3:27
21.	"Can Anybody Hear Me?"	Maraj; James DaVaughn Lennard; James Dean; William Wooten		3:25
22.	"Still I Rise"	Maraj; Clifford Harris; Floyd Hills; Marcella Araica	"No Matter What" by T.I.	3:08
23.	"Beam Me Up Scotty"	Maraj; Andrew Wansel; Karen Chin; Cleveland Browne; Wycliffe Johnson	"Kill the Bitch" by Sasha	3:58
Total length:				73:47

== Personnel ==
Credits adapted from the back cover of Beam Me Up Scotty.

- Debra Antney – executive producer
- Onika Maraj – executive producer
- Sandra Brummels, Giancarlo Pacheco – art direction/design (reissue)
- Mark Gierl – cover art design (reissue)

== Charts ==
=== Weekly charts ===
Weekly chart performance for Beam Me Up Scotty (2021 reissue)
Chart (2021)	Peak position
Australian Albums (ARIA)	41
Belgian Albums (Ultratop Flanders)	73
Belgian Albums (Ultratop Wallonia)	134
Canadian Albums (Billboard)	5
Dutch Albums (Album Top 100)	43
Irish Albums (Official Charts)	32
New Zealand Albums (RMNZ)	32
Swiss Albums (Schweizer Hitparade)	71
UK Albums (Official Charts)	19
UK R&B Albums (Official Charts)	10
US Billboard 200	2
US Top R&B/Hip-Hop Albums (Billboard)	2

=== Year-end charts ===
Year-end chart performance for Beam Me Up Scotty (2021 reissue)
Chart (2021)	Peak position
US Billboard 200	192
US Top R&B/Hip-Hop Albums (Billboard)	76

== Release history ==
List of release dates and formats for Beam Me Up Scotty
Region	Date	Format(s)	Version	Label(s)	Ref.
Various	April 18, 2009	Digital download	Original	Young Money; Aphilliates	
United Kingdom	September 6, 2010	CD	Original	Trapaholics	
Various	May 14, 2021	Digital download; streaming	2021 reissue	Republic	
United States	August 6, 2021	CD	2021 reissue	Republic	
Brazil	August 6, 2021	CD	2021 reissue	Universal Music Brasil	
United States	April 23, 2022	LP	2021 reissue	Republic	
