= Megatron (song) =

2019 single by Nicki Minaj

Single by Nicki Minaj
- Released: June 21, 2019
- Genre: Dancehall; hip hop
- Length: 3:11
- Label: Young Money; Cash Money; Republic
- Songwriters: Onika Maraj; Brittany "Chi" Coney; Denisia "Blu June" Andrews; Haldane Wayne Browne; Pop Wansel
- Producers: Pop Wansel; Nova Wav (add.)

Nicki Minaj singles chronology
| "BAPS" (2019) | "Megatron" (2019) | "Extravagant" (2019) |

Music video
- "Megatron" on YouTube

"Megatron" (stylized in all caps) is a song by rapper Nicki Minaj, released as a standalone single on June 21, 2019, along with its accompanying music video. The song contains a sample of "Heads High" by Jamaican singer Mr. Vegas.

== Background and release ==
"Megatron" is Minaj's only solo single released in 2019. Prior to release, Minaj was on a social media hiatus after wrapping up her world tour, The Nicki Wrld Tour, in Europe.

== Music and lyrics ==
"Megatron" was co-written by Minaj, Brittany "Chi" Coney, Denisia "Blu Jones" Andrews, Haldane Wayne Browne, and Andrew "Pop" Wansel, with additional production by Nova Wav and co-production by Minaj. The song's lyrical content reflects on the spirit of partying, dating, and flirtation. The song's sound is a Caribbean-inspired uptempo rhythm.

== Promotion ==
The song was first teased by Minaj on June 12, 2019, when the rapper posted the word "Megatron" to her social media accounts. One day after, Minaj uploaded a series of pictures from the music video's set, announcing the song's release date and an episode of her own Beats 1 show, Queen Radio, for the same day. A teaser for the music video was posted on June 19. Model Blac Chyna showed support to the song's visuals by posing in pictures with similar backgrounds to Minaj's teasers, leading to speculation she would feature in the music video, rumors Minaj quickly shut down. One day prior to the record's release, the rapper posted a video with her then-boyfriend and now husband, Kenneth Petty, and continued to tease the song.

== Music video ==
On June 19, Minaj released the first teaser for the music video. On June 21, the music video, directed by Mike Ho, was officially premiered on the rapper's YouTube channel.

== Commercial performance ==
In the United States, "Megatron" debuted and peaked at number 20 on the Billboard Hot 100, number 21 on the Rhythmic Songs airplay chart, and was certified Platinum by the RIAA. Outside of the United States, it peaked in the top 40 in the UK, Canada, & Scotland.

== Credits and personnel ==
Credits adapted from Tidal.

- Nicki Minaj – vocals, songwriting, co-production
- Pop Wansel – songwriting, production, programming
- Brittany "Chi" Coney – production
- Denisia "Blu June" Andrews – production
- Haldane Wayne Browne – production
- Nova Wav – additional production, programming
- Aubry "Big Juice" Delaine – record engineering
- Jacob Richards – mixing engineering
- Jaycen Joshua – mixing

== Charts ==
| Chart (2019) | Peak position |
|---|---|
| Australia (ARIA) | 89 |
| Canada Hot 100 (Billboard) | 25 |
| Euro Digital Song Sales (Billboard) | 19 |
| France Downloads (SNEP) | 30 |
| Greece International Digital (IFPI Greece) | 53 |
| Hungary (Single Top 40) | 9 |
| Ireland (IRMA) | 56 |
| Lithuania (AGATA) | 93 |
| New Zealand Hot Singles (RMNZ) | 10 |
| Scottish Singles Sales (Official Charts) | 23 |
| UK Singles (Official Charts) | 34 |
| US Billboard Hot 100 | 20 |
| US Hot R&B/Hip-Hop Songs (Billboard) | 11 |
| US Rhythmic Airplay (Billboard) | 21 |
| US Rolling Stone Top 100 | 14 |

== Certifications ==
| Region | Certification | Certified units/sales |
|---|---|---|
| Australia (ARIA) | Gold | 35,000^{‡} |
| Brazil (Pro-Música Brasil) | Platinum | 40,000^{‡} |
| Canada (Music Canada) | Gold | 40,000^{‡} |
| New Zealand (RMNZ) | Gold | 15,000^{‡} |
| United Kingdom (BPI) | Silver | 200,000^{‡} |
| United States (RIAA) | Platinum | 1,000,000^{‡} |
^{‡} Sales+streaming figures based on certification alone.

== Release history ==
| Region | Date | Format | Label(s) | Ref. |
|---|---|---|---|---|
| Various | June 21, 2019 | Digital download; streaming | Young Money; Cash Money; Republic | |
| United States | July 2, 2019 | Rhythmic contemporary | Young Money; Cash Money; Republic | |
