= Playtime Is Over (mixtape) =

Mixtape by Nicki Minaj
- Released: July 5, 2007
- Genre: Hip-hop
- Length: 44:10
- Label: Dirty Money
- Producer: Big Mike

Nicki Minaj chronology
Playtime Is Over (2007)	Sucka Free (2008)

Playtime Is Over is the debut mixtape by New York–based rapper Nicki Minaj. It was released on July 5, 2007, by Dirty Money Records. It features guest appearances from Hell Rell, Red Café, Murda Mook, Gravy, Lil Wayne, and more. The mixtape helped Minaj gain notice.

== Background and release ==
After working in the hip-hop group Hoodstars, Minaj pursued her music career independently. She uploaded some of her songs to Myspace and reached out to people in the music industry. Through Myspace, Minaj made contact with Fendi, the owner of the Brooklyn production company Dirty Money Entertainment, and signed to Dirty Money.

Playtime Is Over was released on July 5, 2007. Minaj and her manager Debra Antney executive produced the mixtape. Minaj connected with fans on social media, did freestyles, and sold her mixtape from her car. In the mixtape, she debuted one of her alter egos, "Nicki Lewinsky". Minaj filmed a music video for the track "Click Clack", which was featured on the underground rap DVD The Come Up Vol. 11.

As one of the first up-and-coming female rappers to garner buzz in the industry in over a decade, Minaj's work received significant attention.

== Reception and legacy ==
After the release of "Playtime Is Over", Minaj gained notice from Robin Thicke and Gucci Mane. In 2008 after releasing Sucka Free, she received Female Artist of the Year from the Underground Music Awards. Minaj's early discography also received BET awards for Best New Artist and Best Female Hip Hop Artist, and got her nominated for a Teen Choice Award.

"Playtime Is Over" established Nicki Minaj's physical persona as popular and amiable, like a Barbie doll. In an article by MTV, Minaj stated that "We're going with the whole Barbie doll theme so I'm gonna be doing a lot of kooky poses because I have to look like a doll straight out the box. But I'm not a Barbie that needs to play—Playtime is Over." The cover of "Playtime Is Over" shows Minaj with pink lipstick in a pink plastic-looking case, which resembles a packaged barbie doll. However, the music in her mixtape created made Minaj appear aggressive and flaunting; she attacked other rappers directly and boasted about herself through her wordplay. I'm the fearless Barbie doll." MTV states that the two contrasting personalities allowed Minaj to relate to a wide audience, and were therefore instrumental to her success as an artist. "Playtime Is Over" was developed with the help of established artists. Minaj credits collaboration, especially with Lil Wayne, as extremely helpful in increasing the popularity of her albums. In addition, Minaj's early discography lead to high-profile features on songs by Wyclef Jean and Drake, which further increased her popularity.

"Playtime Is Over" is considered unique (compared to albums from other, similar female rappers) in that Minaj put a lot of emphasis on the content of the mixtape, instead of on her sex appeal. Minaj's continued emphasis on her lyrical content, instrumentals, and delivery are reasons why Billboard credits Minaj as being one of the most influential female rappers.

== Track listing ==
No.	Title	Writer(s)	Original instrumental	Length
1.	"1-900-Ms-Minaj" (featuring Hell Rell, Red Café, Murda Mook, Ransom and Gravy)	writer		4:48
2.	"Dreams '07"	writer	"Just Playing (Dreams)" by The Notorious B.I.G.	2:39
3.	"Wuchoo Know"	writer	"Lip Gloss" by Lil Mama	2:18
4.	"Interlude" (featuring Lil Wayne)	writer	"Upgrade U" by Beyoncé featuring Jay-Z	1:50
5.	"Can't Stop Won't Stop" (featuring Lil Wayne)	writer	"Can't Stop, Won't Stop" by Young Gunz	2:26
6.	"Playtime Is Over"	writer	"We Takin' Over" by DJ Khaled featuring T.I., Rick Ross, Fat Joe, Birdman, Lil Wayne and Akon	1:46
7.	"Jump Off '07"	writer	"The Jump Off" by Lil' Kim featuring Mr. Cheeks	2:24
8.	"Click Clack"	writer	"Click Clack" by Slim Thug featuring Pusha T	4:02
9.	"40 Bars"	writer	"Banned from T.V." by Noreaga featuring Nature, Cam'ron and The Lox	2:09
10.	"Dilly Dally"	writer	"Kingdom Come" by Jay-Z	3:03
11.	"Warning"	writer	"Warning" by the Notorious B.I.G.	2:52
12.	"N.I.G.G.A.S." (featuring Angel De-Mar)	writer	"You're Wrong" by Bossman	3:48
13.	"Sunshine" (featuring Gravy)	writer	"(Always Be My) Sunshine" by Jay-Z featuring Foxy Brown	2:39
14.	"Letcha Go" (featuring Angel De-Mar)	writer	"Can't Let You Go" by Fabolous featuring Lil Mo and Mike Shorey	2:37
15.	"Sticks in My Bun"	writer	"Naomi" by Dre	2:46
16.	"I'm Cumin'"	writer	"Mo Money Mo Problems" by the Notorious B.I.G. featuring Puff Daddy and Mase	2:03
17.	"Freestyle"	writer	"Yeah Yeah Yeah" by Terror Squad	1:01
18.	"Hood Story"	writer	"Glory" by Cam'ron featuring Noreaga	1:59
19.	"Ease Up" (featuring Ru Spits)	writer		3:39
20.	"Encore '07"	writer	"Numb/Encore" by Jay-Z & Linkin Park	4:10
Total length:				44:10
