= Sorry (Nicki Minaj and Nas song) =

Unreleased song

Song by Nicki Minaj featuring Nas

from the album Queen (planned)
- Released: August 11, 2018 (leak)
- Length: 3:42

"Sorry" is an unreleased Nicki Minaj song, featuring Nas. The song was intended for inclusion on her 2018 album Queen, but was excluded due to a dispute with Tracy Chapman over its sampling of a cover of "Baby Can I Hold You."

"Sorry" aired once on Funkmaster Flex's radio show on August 11, 2018, having been allegedly leaked by Minaj. Following this, Chapman sued Minaj for copyright infringement. In December 2020, Minaj paid Chapman $450,000 for the incident.

== Composition ==
"Sorry" was created as a collaboration between Minaj and Nas. Rolling Stone described the song as a "love story of sorts," as Minaj and Nas had dated in 2017. "Sorry" was intended as a remake of the Shelly Thunder song of the same name; Thunder's song was a reggae cover of the Tracy Chapman song "Baby Can I Hold You."

== Release ==
On August 1, 2018, Minaj tweeted that she had found out that she had accidentally sampled Tracy Chapman, and asked her followers whether she should delay the album or remove "Sorry." In a Twitter poll, 50.4% voted to "Keep record/push date1 wk" instead of "Keep date/lose record." Despite announcing the album's delay, Queen was released on its original release date of August 10. On the night of August 11, "Sorry" was played on Funkmaster Flex's show on WQHT. According to Chapman's lawsuit, Minaj made sure the track was mastered by Aubry Delaine and sent it to Flex.

== Lawsuit ==
On October 22, 2018, Chapman filed a lawsuit in the United States District Court for the Central District of California, alleging that Minaj had committed copyright infringement. Chapman argued that Minaj should have acquired a license prior to producing the song; Judge Virginia A. Phillips ruled that Minaj's studio experimentation was protected under fair use. On December 17, 2020, Minaj's lawyers offered $450,000 to end the case; Chapman accepted on December 30.
