= Meet the Woo =

Mixtape by Pop Smoke
- Released: July 26, 2019
- Recorded: 2019
- Genres: Drill; grime
- Length: 34:13
- Labels: Victor Victor; Republic
- Producers: 808MeloBeats; Rico Beats; Yoz Beats

Pop Smoke chronology
Meet the Woo (2019)	Meet the Woo 2 (2020)

Singles from Meet the Woo
- 1. "Welcome to the Party" Released: April 23, 2019; 2. "Meet the Woo" Released: June 28, 2019; 3. "Dior" Released: February 11, 2020

Meet the Woo (alternatively titled Meet the Woo, Vol. 1) is the debut mixtape by American rapper Pop Smoke. It was released by Victor Victor Worldwide and Republic Records on July 26, 2019. Meet the Woo is a drill and grime record. All the tracks were recorded in 2019, and were mostly written by Pop Smoke and British producer 808MeloBeats, also known as 808Melo, with production from the latter, Rico Beats, and Yoz Beats.

The mixtape received generally favorable reviews from music critics, who praised Meet the Woo for introducing drill music to the mainstream. A total of three singles were released from 2019 to 2020. The lead single "Welcome to the Party" became a hit in New York, spawning two remixes from rappers Nicki Minaj and Skepta. After Pop Smoke was shot and killed at the age of 20, the mixtape's third and final single "Dior" became the rapper's first solo and posthumous US Billboard Hot 100 hit, peaking at number 22.

Meet the Woo debuted at number 173 on the US Billboard 200 dated August 31, 2019, becoming Pop Smoke's first entry on the chart. After the rapper's death, the mixtape reached a new peak of number 105 on the Billboard 200. The mixtape was more successful outside of the United States, peaking in the top 50 of record charts in Denmark, Sweden, and the Netherlands.

== Background and release ==
American rapper Pop Smoke began his music career in 2018 when visiting a Brooklyn recording studio with fellow rapper Jay Gwuapo. After Gwuapo got high on drugs, he fell asleep. Pop Smoke went into a recording booth to try rapping for the first time. He used a beat he got from British producer 808MeloBeats', also known as 808Melo, YouTube channel and recorded a remixed version of American rapper Sheff G's 2017 single "Panic Part 3" titled "Mpr (Panic Part 3 Remix)". In April 2019, Pop Smoke befriended American producer Rico Beats, who was acquainted with Haitian-American record executive Steven Victor. The three set up an interview, and Pop Smoke got signed to Victor Victor Worldwide, a subsidiary of Universal Music. On April 23, 2019, Pop Smoke released "Welcome to the Party". The single was a breakout in New York, gathering millions of views on YouTube. In a Genius interview, Pop Smoke stated he got "Welcome to the Party"'s beat from YouTube. Pop Smoke and 808Melo wrote and recorded most of the mixtape in New York City and London. On July 15, 2019, Pop Smoke announced the release date for Meet the Woo. On July 26, 2019, Meet the Woo was released by Victor Victor Worldwide and Republic Records. A deluxe edition of the mixtape was released on September 13, 2019, and featured two remixes of "Welcome to the Party".

On January 29, 2020, Pop Smoke announced his debut concert tour Meet the Woo Tour and teased a promotional flyer of the tour to promote both Meet the Woo and Meet the Woo 2. Tour dates were released on the same day for North America, while dates for the United Kingdom were revealed in February. The tour was planned to begin in the US in March, and end in the UK in April. On February 19, 2020, Pop Smoke was shot and killed at age of 20 during a home invasion. Four hooded men, including one who was wearing a ski mask and carrying a handgun, broke into a Hollywood Hills house the rapper was renting. A 15-year-old boy, the youngest of the four intruders, shot Pop Smoke three times in the chest with a Beretta M9 after fighting with him. Pop Smoke was rushed to Cedars-Sinai Medical Center, where doctors performed a thoracotomy on the left side of his chest but a few hours later, he was pronounced dead.

== Music and lyrics ==
Aron A. of HotNewHipHop mentions that Rico Beats and 808MeloBeats "bring together elements from grime and drill to form a truly unique style tailored perfectly for Pop Smoke". Danny Schwartz of Rolling Stone commented the mixtape "filtered New York City's tradition of raucous, streetwise melodramas through the militant spirit of Chicago drill and the woozy, haunting production of London drill". DeMicia Inman for Def Pen stated the opening track "Meet the Woo" has "quick, rhythmic verses with a smooth, deep bass voice drastically different from the melodic rap popular now". Pop Smoke told Genius that "Welcome to the Party" was not about girls but the streets and gangs. It is followed by drill track "Hawk Em", where Pop Smoke raps: "I'm a gentlemen and gangster/Double G, niggas know there's only one of me." In the fourth song "Better Have Your Gun", Pop Smoke goes from being "ignorant bravado" to being evil and playful, rapping about designer brands.

Alphonse Pierre of Pitchfork commented that Pop Smoke's vocals on "Scenario" are "harrowing and Marvel-supervillain worthy, the beat a haunted amusement park". "Dior" is a drill and hip hop track with lyrics about flirting with women and buying the latest designer clothes. David Crone of AllMusic opined that "Feeling" has "slushy tones" and that it sounds "sluggish rather than impactful". In "PTSD", Pop Smoke uses a spoken word approach instead of rapping. Pop Smoke mentions about getting his revenge seven years later on a kid for hitting him, and that he is not going to any clubs without a $25,000 deposit to support his love for designer clothes. Dhruva Balram of NME said the rapper talks about "the trauma he endured growing up" while Michael Saponara for Billboard mentions Pop Smoke "opens up about suffering from PTSD after all of the trauma he's endured growing up in Brooklyn". Crone commeneted that when Pop Smoke "sounds at home" on the closing track "Brother Man", he's "often let down by writing".

== Promotion ==
=== Singles ===
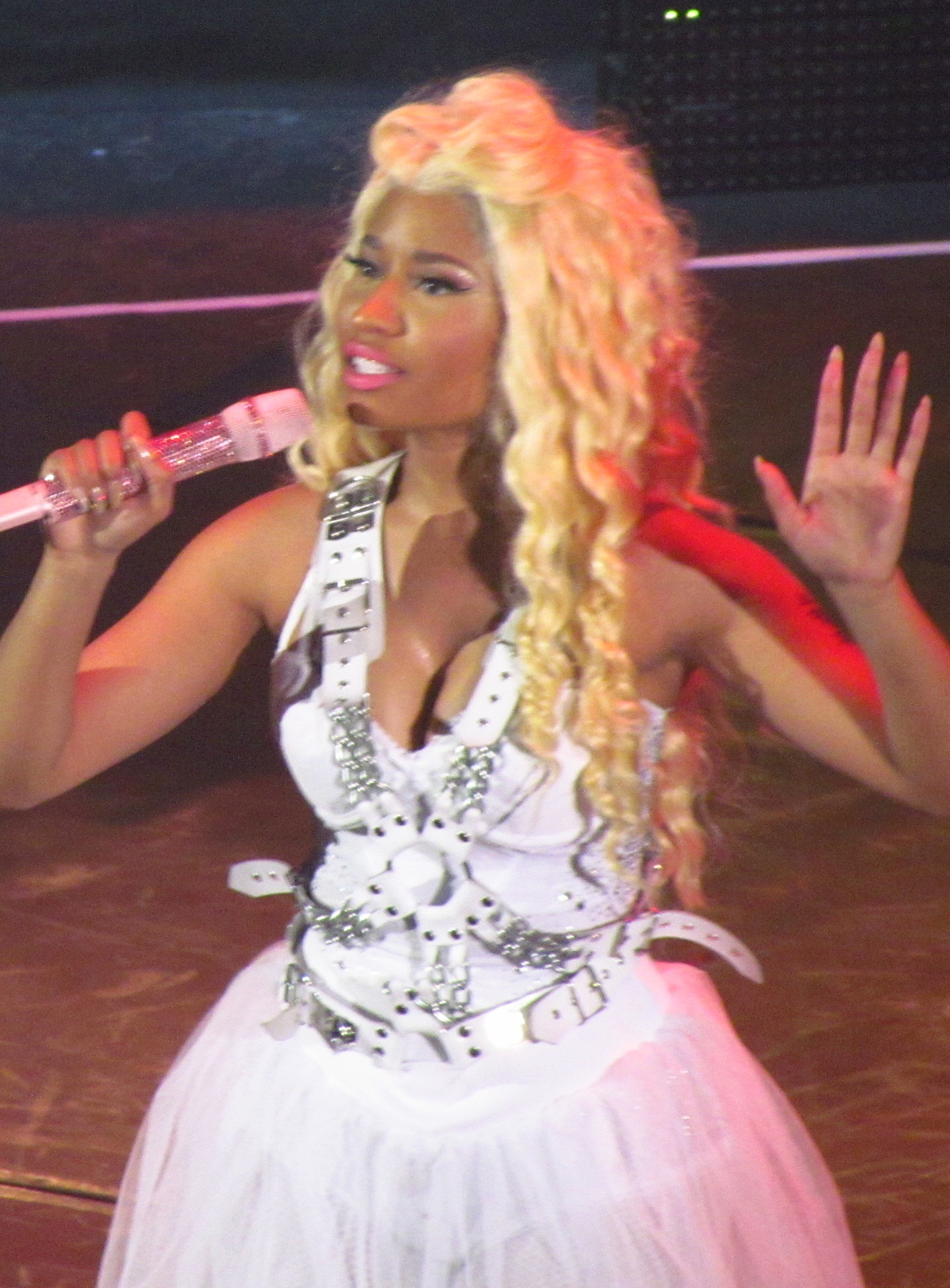
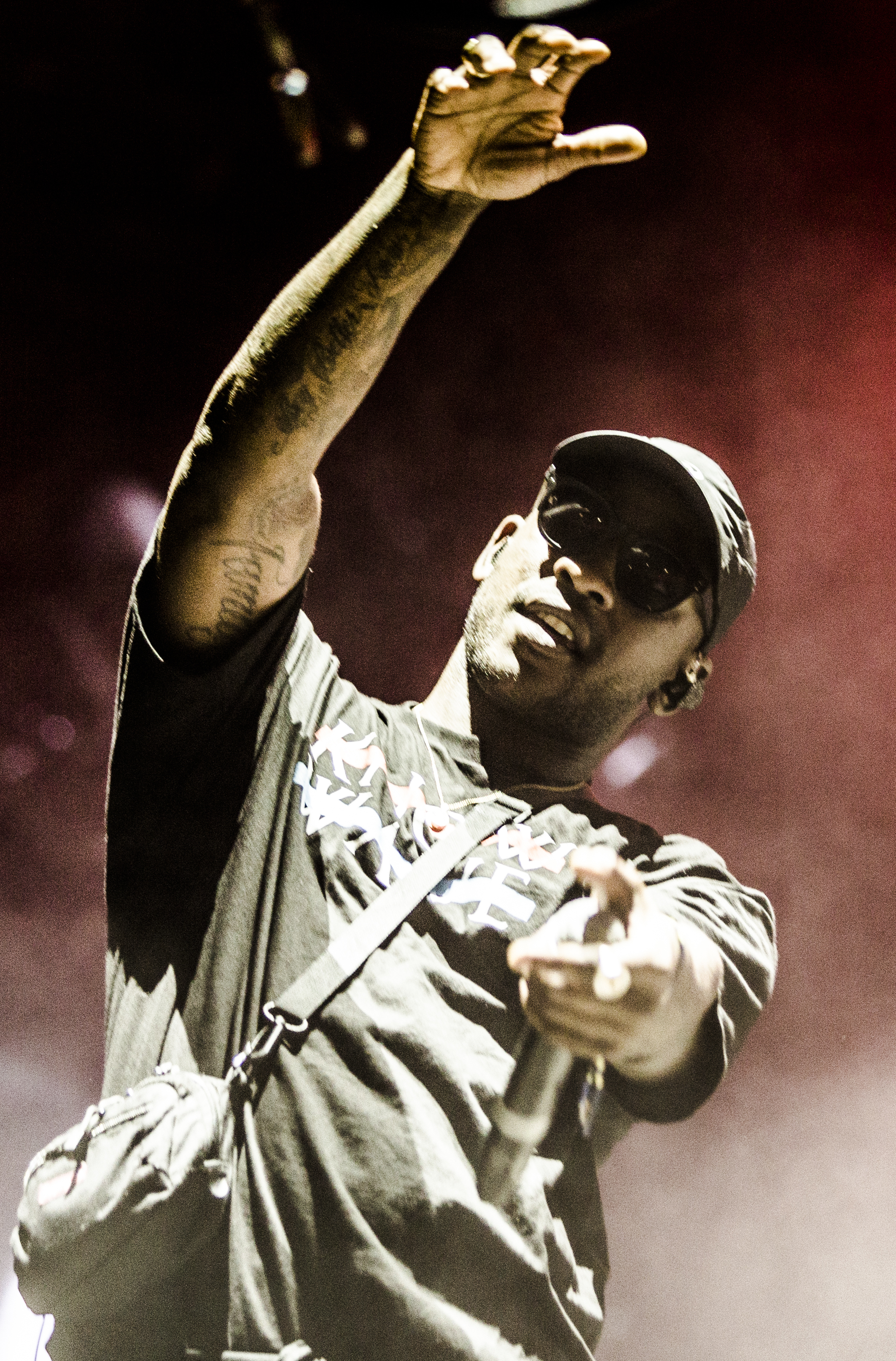
"Welcome to the Party" was promoted by two remixes, one featuring US rapper Nicki Minaj (left), and the other featuring British rapper Skepta.

On April 23, 2019, Pop Smoke released Meet the Woo's lead single "Welcome to the Party". A music video for "Welcome to the Party" was released on May 28, 2019. The visual was directed and produced by GoddyGoddy. It features a group of men saying the names of people who are dead or imprisoned while Pop Smoke raps the song and holds a small child in his arms. The song was followed by two remixes, one featuring rapper Nicki Minaj, which was released on August 16, 2019, and the other featuring British rapper Skepta, which was released on August 21, 2019. The remixes were later released on the reissue deluxe release of the mixtape. The remix featuring Minaj peaked at number five on the US Billboard Bubbling Under Hot 100 chart.

"Meet the Woo" was released as the mixtape's second single on June 28, 2019. The song's music video was released on April 16, 2019, and was directed by GoddyGoddy. It shows the late rapper being surrounded by his friends and family. "Dior" was sent to American rhythmic contemporary radio as the third and final single on February 11, 2020. A music video for the song was released on September 3, 2019, and was directed, produced, and edited by JLShotThat. The visual features Pop Smoke and a group of men and women dancing to the track in a strip club and in a nearby parking lot. After Pop Smoke was murdered, "Dior" debuted at number 49 on the US Billboard Hot 100, becoming the rapper's first solo and posthumous Hot 100. Following the release of Pop Smoke's posthumous debut studio album Shoot for the Stars, Aim for the Moon (2020), the track peaked at number 22 on the Hot 100. In November 2020, "Dior" received a nomination for Best Rap Performance at the 63rd Annual Grammy Awards.

=== Live performances ===
In October 2019, Pop Smoke performed "Dior" and "Welcome to the Party" live on MTV's Total Request Live offshoot program Fresh Out Friday. A month later, he performed both songs for VevoDSCVR, a platform showcasing emerging young artists. On November 27, 2019, Pop Smoke performed some songs from the mixtape at the Islington Assembly Hall in Islington, London. Later in December, he performed "Dior" live at a Rolling Loud concert in Los Angeles, California. In February of the next year, shortly after his death, the Yard Club in Paris, France, debuted an on-stage hologram of Pop Smoke that virtually performed "Dior" and "Welcome to the Party".

== Reception ==
=== Critical reception ===
Professional ratings
Review scores
Source	Rating
AllMusic	2.5/5 stars
Pitchfork	7.6/10

Pierre, who gave the mixtape a 7.6 out of 10, said it "might be occasionally unimaginative, but overall Meet the Woo injects life into a Brooklyn drill scene that was running on fumes". Jon Caramanica, writing for The New York Times stated that Meet the Woo is a mixtape "full of tossed-off threats and rowdy bluster, a soundtrack for rumbles in dark basements". Writing for Vulture, Paul Thompson opined the mixtape "helped shape Brooklyn's drill scene, an emerging web of young artists who posit that New York can be just as interesting as an importer — and mutator — of other regional sounds". Crone gave the mixtape two and a half stars out of five, saying Meet the Woo has "lack of direction; from aimless style-mashing to rehashed lyrics, it's hard to see the album as anything more than a collision of styles". He continues, saying it "flounders more than it flourishes. As well as a poor showing for [Pop] Smoke, this is a disappointing mainstream statement from Brooklyn's otherwise vibrant scene".

=== Commercial performance ===
Meet the Woo debuted at number 173 on the US Billboard 200 dated August 31, 2019, becoming Pop Smoke's first entry on the chart. It later reached a peak of number 105 on the chart following the rapper's death. Outside of Pop Smoke's native the United States, the mixtape peaked at number 27 in Sweden, number 31 in Denmark, number 49 in the Netherlands, number 98 in Canada, number 123 in France, and number 158 in the Belgium Flanders chart.

== Track listing ==
Meet the Woo track listing
No.	Title	Writer(s)	Producer(s)	Length
1.	"Meet the Woo"	Bashar Jackson; Andre Loblack	808MeloBeats	2:01
2.	"Welcome to the Party"	Jackson; Loblack	808MeloBeats	3:35
3.	"Hawk Em"	Jackson; Loblack	808MeloBeats	1:59
4.	"Better Have Your Gun"	Jackson; Loblack	808MeloBeats; Yoz Beats	3:20
5.	"Scenario"	Jackson; Loblack	808MeloBeats	4:02
6.	"Dior"	Jackson; Loblack	808MeloBeats	3:36
7.	"Feeling"	Jackson; Loblack; Ricardo Lamarre	808MeloBeats; Rico Beats	2:41
8.	"PTSD"	Jackson; Bartosz Welka; Marcin Gerek	Rico Beats	3:20
9.	"Brother Man"	Jackson; Loblack; Lamarre	808MeloBeats; Rico Beats	3:03
Total length:				27:37

Deluxe edition (bonus tracks)
No.	Title	Writer(s)	Producer(s)	Length
10.	"Welcome to the Party" (Remix; featuring Nicki Minaj)	Jackson; Loblack; Onika Maraj	808MeloBeats	3:01
11.	"Welcome to the Party" (Remix; featuring Skepta)	Jackson; Loblack; Joseph Adenuga	808MeloBeats	3:35
Total length:				34:13

== Personnel ==
- Pop Smoke – vocals
- 808MeloBeats – programming (1–6, 9–11)
- Rico Beats – programming (7–9)
- Yosief Tafari – additional vocals (4)
- Jaycen Joshua – mixer
- Colin Leonard – mastering engineer (10, 11)
- Dom Martin – recording engineer (1, 2, 10, 11)
- Yung Ave – recording engineer (3–6, 8, 9)
- Vic Wainstein – recording engineer (4, 6, 8)
- Christopher Ulrich – recording engineer (7, 8)
- John Muller – engineer (2)
- DJ Riggins – assistant mixer (3–7, 9, 10)
- Jacob Richards – assistant mixer (3–7, 9, 10)
- Mike Seaberg – assistant mixer (3–7, 9, 10)

== Charts ==
=== Weekly charts ===
Chart performance for Meet the Woo
Chart (2019–2020)	Peak position
Belgian Albums (Ultratop Flanders)	158
Danish Albums (Hitlisten)	31
Canadian Albums (Billboard)	98
Dutch Albums (Album Top 100)	49
French Albums (SNEP)	123
Swedish Albums (Sverigetopplistan)	27
US Billboard 200	105

=== Year-end charts ===
2020 year-end chart performance for Meet the Woo
Chart (2020)	Position
Danish Albums (Hitlisten)	80
Icelandic Albums (Tónlistinn)	21
Swedish Albums (Sverigetopplistan)	71

2021 year-end chart performance for Meet the Woo
Chart (2021)	Position
Icelandic Albums (Tónlistinn)	39

== Certifications ==
Certifications and sales for Meet the Woo
Region	Certification	Certified units/sales
Denmark (IFPI Danmark)	Platinum	20,000^{‡}
Italy (FIMI)	Gold	25,000^{‡}
Poland (ZPAV)	Gold	10,000^{‡}
United Kingdom (BPI)	Silver	60,000^{‡}
^{‡} Sales+streaming figures based on certification alone.
