= PTAF =

American hip hop group

- Also known as: Pretty Taking All Fades
- Origin: South Los Angeles, California, U.S.
- Genres: Hip hop, crunk
- Years active: 2012–Present
- Label: Capitol Records (2014–2015)
- Members: Kandii; K'Duce; Alizé

PTAF (acronym of Pretty and Taking All Fades) is an American hip hop crunk girl group from Los Angeles consisting of Kandi, K'Duce, and Alizé. They are most known for their viral song "Boss Ass Bitch", which gathered the attention of the public and scored them a record deal with Capitol Records in January 2014. In mid 2015, PTAF was dropped from Capitol Records after failing to find success with a second single. In 2017, the group announced on social media that they had split up and that the individual members were pursuing solo careers but still remain friends. In October 2020, the group came back together to be featured on a song with Ayce Nyce, which has been streamed over 1 million times worldwide.

PTAF came together at Crenshaw Charter. The song was released May 9, 2012 accompanied by a music video. The music video was filmed in front of a silver gate at the school SEA Crenshaw. On 29 March 2014, PTAF joined Vevo and released a more updated music video. Originally, the girls were going to say, "I don't like that bitch" repetitively but used "boss" to promote female empowerment. The song gained popularity when used virally by users on the video site Vine.

PTAF signed with Capitol Records around the time that Nicki Minaj released an unauthorized remix of "Boss Ass Bitch". Some press outlets reported that Minaj's mix drew Capitol's attention to the group, while others related that Capitol was already interested in the group at the time Minaj's remix was released. After "Boss Ass Bitch" was placed in the movie The Bronze, the group was contacted by actress Melissa Rauch to collaborate an original song for the film, which yielded the track "Fuck That". On May 14, 2021, Nicki Minaj officially released her "Beam Me Up Scotty" mixtape to streaming services, which included the "Boss Ass Bitch" remix. The remix debuted and peaked at number 16 on the Billboard Bubbling Under Hot 100 Chart on the chart dated May 29, 2021.

== Singles ==
Title	Year
"Boss Ass Bitch"	2012
"Do Yo Shit"	2014
"Turnnup"	2014
"Fly Shit Only"	2014
"Fuck the Law"	2014
"Hol Up"	2014
"You Playin"	2015
"In The Light"	2015
"Above the Law"	2016
"Dont Know"	2016
