= Extravagant =

Single by Lil Durk featuring Nicki Minaj

from the album Love Songs 4 the Streets 2
- Released: August 2, 2019
- Genre: Hip hop
- Length: 3:19
- Label: Interscope Records, Alamo Records
- Songwriters: Durk Banks: José Julian de la Cruz; Nicki Minaj; Widnick Prevalon

Lil Durk singles chronology
"Play With Us" (2018)	"Extravagant" (2019)	"Green Light" (2019)

Nicki Minaj singles chronology
"Megatron" (2019)	"Extravagant" (2019)	"Hot Girl Summer" (2019)

"Extravagant" is a song by American rapper Lil Durk recorded for his fourth studio album Love Songs 4 the Streets 2. The song features vocals by Nicki Minaj. The song was produced by Julian Cruz and Skufl. Additional writing was done by Jose Julian De La Cruz, Widnick Prevalon, Nicki Minaj and Lil Durk.

== Background ==
The song marks the second time Durk and Minaj worked together on a track, the first collaboration being "Slide Around" from the album The Big Day by Chance The Rapper. On July 29, "Extravagant" was premiered on the Apple Music Beats 1 radio show and was subsequently released as a way to promote the then-upcoming album which was set to be released on August 2.

== Composition ==
"Extravagant" is a slow R&B song. On the song both rappers talk about sex and how Nicki can do sex better than other girls. Durk's verse was recorded using auto-tune.
