= I Am Music II Tour =

2011 concert tour by Lil Wayne

- Tour by Lil Wayne
- Start date: March 18, 2011
- End date: September 11, 2011
- Legs: 2
- No. of shows: 67

Lil Wayne concert chronology
- America's Most Wanted Tour (2009); I Am Music II Tour' (2011); Drake vs. Lil Wayne (2014)

The I Am Music II Tour (also referred as I Am Still Music Tour), was a North American concert tour headlined by American rapper Lil Wayne, and with several special guests. The tour was announced on January 24, 2011, and the tickets went on sale on February 4.

== Opening Acts ==
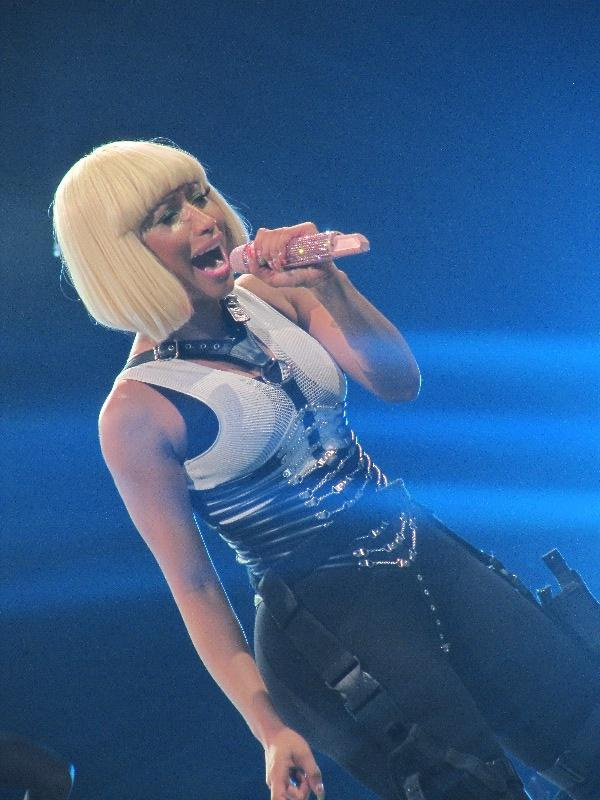
Nicki Minaj was an opening act on the first leg of the tour.

Leg One:

- Nicki Minaj
- Rick Ross
- Porcelain Black
- Travis Barker
- Mixmaster Mike

Leg Two:

- Keri Hilson
- Rick Ross
- Porcelain Black
- Lloyd
- Far East Movement

== Setlist ==
Nicki Minaj
1. "Massive Attack"
2. "Up All Night"
3. "Roman's Revenge"
4. "Bottoms Up"
5. "Did It on 'Em"
6. "Moment 4 Life"
7. "My Chick Bad"
8. "Letting Go (Dutty Love)"
9. "Super Bass"
10. "Right Thru Me"
11. "Monster"

== Tour dates ==
Date	City	Country	Venue
March 16, 2011	Providence	United States	Dunkin' Donuts Center
March 18, 2011	Buffalo	United States	HSBC Arena
March 19, 2011	Columbus	United States	Nationwide Arena
March 20, 2011	Baltimore	United States	First Mariner Arena
March 23, 2011	Hampton	United States	Hampton Coliseum
March 24, 2011	Cleveland	United States	Quicken Loans Arena
March 26, 2011	Philadelphia	United States	Wells Fargo Center
March 27, 2011	Uniondale	United States	Nassau Coliseum
March 30, 2011	University Park	United States	Bryce Jordan Center
April 1, 2011	Chicago	United States	United Center
April 2, 2011	Auburn Hills	United States	The Palace of Auburn Hills
April 3, 2011	Washington, D.C.	United States	Verizon Center
April 5, 2011	Miami	United States	Bank Atlantic Center
April 6, 2011	Orlando	United States	Amway Center
April 8, 2011	Greensboro	United States	Greensboro Coliseum Complex
April 9, 2011	Atlanta	United States	Philips Arena
April 10, 2011	St. Louis	United States	Scottrade Center
April 12, 2011	Bloomington	United States	Indiana University Auditorium
April 14, 2011	New Orleans	United States	New Orleans Arena
April 15, 2011	Dallas	United States	American Airlines Center
April 16, 2011	Houston	United States	Toyota Center
April 19, 2011	Phoenix	United States	US Airways Center
April 22, 2011	Los Angeles	United States	STAPLES Center
April 23, 2011	Anaheim	United States	Honda Center
April 24, 2011	Oakland	United States	Oracle Arena
April 26, 2011	Sacramento	United States	Power Balance Pavilion
April 27, 2011	Vancouver	Canada	Rogers Arena
April 28, 2011	Edmonton	Canada	Rexall Place
April 29, 2011	Calgary	Canada	Scotiabank Saddledome
May 1, 2011	East Rutherford	United States	Bamboozle Festival
July 13, 2011	Hartford	United States	Comcast Theatre
July 15, 2011	Bristow	United States	Jiffy Lube Live
July 16, 2011	Holmdel	United States	PNC Bank Arts Center
July 17, 2011	Mansfield	United States	Comcast Center
July 19, 2011	Scranton	United States	Toyota Pavilion at Montage Mountain
July 20, 2011	Saratoga Springs	United States	Saratoga Performing Arts Center
July 22, 2011	Cuyahoga Falls	United States	Blossom Music Center
July 23, 2011	Camden	United States	Susquehanna Bank Center
July 24, 2011	Darien	United States	Darien Lake
July 26, 2011	Hershey	United States	Hershey Park Pavilion
July 27, 2011	Cincinnati	United States	Riverbend Music Center
July 29, 2011	Raleigh	United States	Time Warner Cable Music Pavilion
July 30, 2011	Virginia Beach	United States	Farm Bureau Live at Virginia Beach
August 2, 2011	West Palm Beach	United States	Cruzan Amphitheatre
August 3, 2011	Tampa	United States	1-800-ASK-GARY Amphitheatre
August 5, 2011	Birmingham	United States	Verizon Wireless Music Center
August 6, 2011	Atlanta	United States	Aaron's Amphitheatre at Lakewood
August 7, 2011	Charlotte	United States	Verizon Wireless Amphitheatre
August 9, 2011	Minneapolis	United States	Xcel Center
August 10, 2011	Milwaukee	United States	Marcus Amphitheater
August 12, 2011	Burgettstown	United States	First Niagara Pavilion
August 13, 2011	Tinley Park	United States	First Midwest Bank Amphitheatre
August 14, 2011	Noblesville	United States	Klipsch Music Center
August 16, 2011	Ottawa	Canada	Scotiabank Place
August 17, 2011	Montreal	Canada	Bell Centre
August 19, 2011	Toronto	Canada	Molson Canadian Amphitheatre
August 20, 2011	Clarkston	United States	DTE Energy Music Theatre
August 21, 2011	Maryland Heights	United States	Verizon Wireless Amphitheater
August 23, 2011	Kansas City	United States	Sprint Center
August 25, 2011	Phoenix	United States	Ashley Furniture HomeStore Pavilion
August 26, 2011	San Diego	United States	Cricket Wireless Amphitheatre
August 27, 2011	San Bernardino	United States	San Manuel Amphitheater
August 30, 2011	Greenwood Village	United States	Comfort Dental Amphitheatre
August 31, 2011	Albuquerque	United States	The Pavilion
September 2, 2011	Mountain View	United States	Shoreline Amphitheatre
September 3, 2011	Marysville	United States	Sleep Train Amphitheatre
September 4, 2011	Auburn	United States	White River Amphitheatre
September 7, 2011	Omaha	United States	CenturyLink Center Omaha
September 9, 2011	San Antonio	United States	AT&T Center
September 10, 2011	Dallas	United States	Gexa Energy Pavilion
September 11, 2011	The Woodlands	United States	Cynthia Woods Mitchell Pavilion
