= Moneymaker =

Moneymaker or Money Maker may refer to:

== Surname ==
- Amelia Moneymaker, American artistic gymnast
- Chris Moneymaker (born 1975), American poker player
  - Moneymaker effect
- Heidi Moneymaker, gymnast and stunt performer
- Kelly Moneymaker (born 1970), American singer

== Music ==
- Money Maker (Re-Loaded), 2012 album from Froggy Fresh
- "Money Maker", 2006 song by Ludacris
- "The Moneymaker", 2007 song by Rilo Kiley
- "Money Maker", a 2011 song by The Black Keys from their El Camino
- "Money Maker", 1994 song by The NPG
- "Moneymaker", a 2012 song by Diego's Umbrella from their album Proper Cowboy
- "Moneymaker", a 2022 song by Fitz and the Tantrums from their album Let Yourself Free

== Other uses ==
- Moneymakers, 1970s Canadian business television series
- The Moneymakers, 1960s Canadian game show
- Moneymaker tomato, an heirloom tomato cultivar
- "The Moneymaker", a 1956 episode of The 20th Century-Fox Hour

== See also ==
- Shake Your Moneymaker (disambiguation)
- Money
