= Blazin' (song) =

Song by Nicki Minaj featuring Kanye West

from the album Pink Friday
- Recorded: 2010
- Studio: Glenwood Place Studios (Burbank, CA)
- Genre: Hip hop; electronic; hyperpop
- Length: 5:02
- Label: Young Money; Cash Money; Universal Motown
- Songwriters: Onika Maraj; Kanye West; W. Brown; Andrew Thielk; Keith Forsey; Steve Schiff
- Producer: Skyz Muzik

Audio video
- "Blazin" on YouTube

"Blazin'" is a song by American hip hop artist Nicki Minaj that features Kanye West, from her debut studio album, Pink Friday (2010).

== Background ==
Earlier in the year of Pink Friday's release, Minaj had a guest verse on West's single "Monster" from his album My Beautiful Dark Twisted Fantasy (2010). "Blazin'" leaked online on November 17, 2010, along with fellow album track "Fly" that features Rihanna.

== Composition and recording ==
The song includes a sample of 1985 recording "Don't You (Forget About Me)" by Simple Minds. Minaj revealed via Twitter in March 2017 that she had to beg West to not be on fellow album song "Right Thru Me", as he really wanted to get on it, and also that the hook on "Blazin'" was freestyled by her in the studio.

== Critical reception ==
After hearing the leak, HipHop-N-More described Minaj and West as being a 'lethal combination'. Idolator cited the track as an example of Pink Friday's 'club-ready dance tunes'.

== Commercial performance ==
The song peaked at number 4 on the US Billboard Bubbling Under R&B/Hip-Hop Singles chart and spent a total of four weeks on it.

== Charts ==
Chart performance for "Blazin'"
Chart (2010)	Peak position
US Bubbling Under R&B/Hip-Hop Singles (Billboard)	4
