= Best Friend =

Best Friend or Best Friends may refer to:

== Film and television ==
- Best Friend (film), a 2020 South Korean film
- Best Friends (1982 film), a film starring Goldie Hawn and Burt Reynolds
- Best Friends (1975 film), a film by Noel Nosseck
- Best Friends, a Telugu film by Sunil Kumar Reddy
- Best F(r)iends, a film starring Tommy Wiseau and Greg Sestero
- "Best Friend" (Peppa Pig), a 2004 episode
- "Best Friends" (Star Wars: Young Jedi Adventures), a 2024 episode
- "Best Friends", a Thomas & Friends season 12 episode

== Literature ==
- Best Friends (Martin novel), part of the Main Street book series
- Best Friends (Wilson novel), a children's novel by Jacqueline Wilson
- Best Friends, a 2003 novel by Thomas Berger

== Music ==
=== Albums ===
- Best Friends (Cleo Laine and John Williams album) (1978)
- Best Friend (Edmond Leung album) (1997)
- Best Friend (Hillsong United album) (2000)
- Best Friends?, a 2010 album by Brad

=== Songs ===
- "Best Friend" (50 Cent song) (2005)
- "Best Friend" (The Beat song) (1980)
- "Best Friend" (Brandy song) (1994)
- "Best Friend" (Foster the People song) (2014)
- "Best Friend" (Conan Gray song) (2022)
- "Your best friend" (Toby Fox song) (2016)
- "Best Friend" (Kana Nishino song) (2010)
- "Best Friend" (Saweetie song) (2021)
- "Best Friend" (Toy-Box song) (1999)
- "Best Friend" (Sofi Tukker song) (2017)
- "Best Friend" (Yelawolf song) (2015)
- "Best Friend" (Young Thug song) (2015)
- "Best Friend", by Toni Braxton from Toni Braxton (1993)
- "Best Friend", by C.T.F.G. from Casper: A Spirited Beginning (1997)
- "Best Friend", by Candlebox from Lucy (1995)
- "Best Friend", by Johnny Cash from Any Old Wind That Blows (1973)
- "Best Friend", by Jason Chen (2011)
- "Best Friend", by the Drums from The Drums (2010)
- "Best Friend", by iKon from Return (2018)
- "Best Friend", by James Marriott from Don't Tell the Dog (2025)
- "Best Friend", by Kiroro (2001)
- "Best Friend", by Madonna from MDNA (2012)
- "Best Friend", by Paul McCartney & Wings from Red Rose Speedway (1973)
- "Best Friend", by Megan Thee Stallion from Megan: Act II (2024)
- "Best Friend", by Helen Reddy from I Don't Know How to Love Him (1971)
- "Best Friend", by Rex Orange County (2017)
- "Best Friend", by S Club 7 from 7 (2000)
- "Best Friend", by Stan Walker from All In (Stan Walker album) (2022)
- "Best Friend", by Pharrell Williams from In My Mind (2006)
- "Best Friend", by Younha from Someday (2008)
- "Best Friend (The Unicorn Song)", by Margie Adam from Margie Adam. Songwriter. (1976)
- "Best Friends" (Froggy Fresh song) (2012)
- "Best Friends" (Sophia Grace song) (2014)
- "Best Friends", by 5 Seconds of Summer from 5SOS5 (2022)
- "Best Friends", by Allstars from Allstars (2001)
- "Best Friends", by Ron Sexsmith from Cobblestone Runway (2002)
- "Best Friends", by The Weeknd from Dawn FM (2022)

== Other uses ==
- Best friends forever, a close friendship
- Best Friend (play), a 1976 Broadway play by Michael Sawyer
- Best Friends (professional wrestling), a professional wrestling tag team
- Best Friends Animal Society, an animal welfare organization based in the United States

== See also ==
- Best friends forever
- Best Fwends, a musical group from Texas
- Best Friend of Charleston, an early railroad locomotive
- Best of Friends (disambiguation)
- Man's best friend, a phrase describing domestic dogs
