= Fly (Nicki Minaj song) =

2011 single by Nicki Minaj featuring Rihanna

Single by Nicki Minaj featuring Rihanna

from the album Pink Friday
- Released: August 30, 2011
- Recorded: 2010
- Studio: Glenwood Place Studios (Burbank, California); Chalice Recording Studios (Los Angeles, California)
- Genre: Hip-hop; electro-R&B
- Length: 3:32
- Label: Young Money; Cash Money; Universal Motown; Universal Republic
- Songwriters: Onika Maraj; J. R. Rotem; Kevin Hissink; W. Jordan; Clemm Rishad
- Producers: J. R. Rotem; Kevin Hissink

Nicki Minaj singles chronology
"Lollipop Luxury" (2011)	"Fly" (2011)	"Y.U. Mad" (2011)

Rihanna singles chronology
"Cheers (Drink to That)" (2011)	"Fly" (2011)	"We Found Love" (2011)

Music video
- "Fly" (Clean) on YouTube

"Fly" is a song by Trinidadian rapper Nicki Minaj, featuring Barbadian singer Rihanna, from Minaj's debut studio album, Pink Friday (2010). It was released on August 30, 2011 by Young Money, Cash Money, Universal Motown and Universal Republic as the eighth and final single from the album. The track was written by Minaj, producers J. R. Rotem and Kevin Hissink, Will Jordan, and Clemm Rishad. Minaj wrote it about soaring above and overcoming stereotypes and negativity to come out victorious. Several music critics praised its lyrics, as well as the chemistry between Minaj and Rihanna, but were critical of its formulaic production.

In the United States, "Fly" peaked at number 19 on the Billboard Hot 100. It also peaked within the top 20 of the charts in Australia, Ireland, New Zealand and the United Kingdom. The song's music video, directed by Sanaa Hamri, depicts Minaj and Rihanna experiencing the destruction in a post-apocalyptic environment.

== Writing and recording ==
"Fly" was written by Minaj, J.R. Rotem, Kevin Hissink, W. Jordan and Clemm Rishad. Production of the song was handled by Rotem. Rotem said the song almost did not make the cut for Pink Friday and was the last addition to the album; "Near the tail end of her project, I came into the studio and I had some tracks [for her]. That was one of the ones I was excited about. When I played it for her, she knew instantly: 'Yes, this is the record.'" The demo version featured a studio-vocalist that would have later been an uncredited vocalist on the track, however Minaj decided to ask Rihanna to sing it. Rotem noted, "It took time because she was promoting her own album and traveling overseas. It happened, and I heard it when Nicki gave me the record and it really was one of those incredible things that was really a blessing. It manifested. She said she wanted it and it happened."

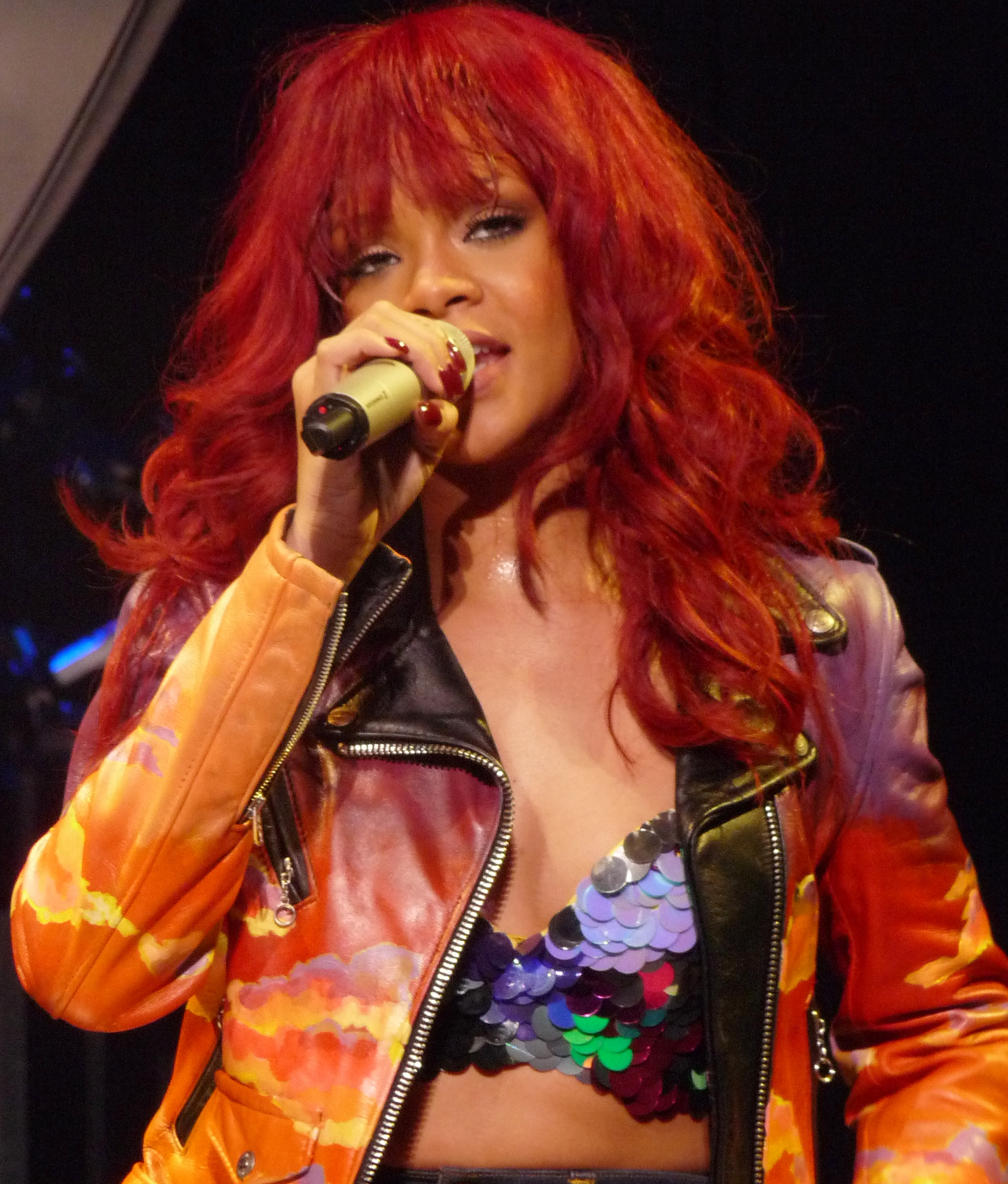
Rihanna's vocals on the song was a last minute addition.

During a Pink Friday Diaries session, Minaj talked more in depth about the song. "FLY is one of my absolute faves. I wanted to work with Rihanna for a long time. I'm very proud of her accomplishments [...] This song is a female empowerment song. But then again, it's not specific to just women. It speaks about flying, soaring high in the face of every single solitary adversity that comes your way. I speak about how the media has attempted to box me in and how that has made me feel suffocated. After years of being dragged thru the mud, I've mustered up the courage to re-define myself."

The song was recorded by Aerial Chobaz and Charles Moniz at Glenwood Place Studios, Burbank, California and at Chalice Recording Studios, Los Angeles, California. They were assisted by Lyttleton "Cartwheel" Carter. It was mixed by Carter, Chobaz and Rotem at Glenwood Recording Studios and Chalice Recording Studios. Instrumentation was provided for by Rotem and Hissink. Rihanna appears on the track as a featured artist courtesy of Def Jam Recordings.

According to the sheet music published at Musicnotes.com by Sony/ATV Music Publishing, "Fly" is written in the key of B♭ major, with a relaxed-four tempo of 120 beats per minute. The song follows a chord progression of B♭–C^{7}sus–Gm^{7}–E♭, while Rihanna and Nicki's vocals span from B♭_{3} to D_{5}.

== Critical reception ==
Margaret Wappler of the Los Angeles Times complimented the song's collaboration, stating, "Even though her roots are elsewhere, Minaj sounds better on the Pink Friday tracks that are more squarely in the club R&B vein, which she almost always spikes with enough rap to remind anyone that she isn't another Beyonce or even Sasha Fierce, not by any stretch. 'Fly' makes good work out of its Rihanna cameo — while the dark glamour bird soars, Minaj skitters around her with her vulnerable but choppy rhymes, equal parts tough woman and big softie." Scott Plagenhoef of Pitchfork complimented the song and how it made Pink Friday the record it is by stating, "but these tracks – plus the Rihanna collaboration "Fly" and the solo ballad "Save Me"—are the best examples of what Pink Friday is rather than what many of us wanted it to be."

Rob Sheffield of Rolling Stone commented on the genre of choice and the toned-down sexiness, "Minaj aims for a Rihanna-style crossover approach, singing R&B choruses over electro floss and toning down her nasty side." Marc Hogan of Spin complimented the song's inspirational tone and that other cuts from the album, including "Fly", "have her charismatically colorful, larger-than-life personality all over them."

== Chart performance ==
"Fly" debuted at number 22 in New Zealand on September 5, 2011. The following week, the song climbed into the top 20 of the chart at number 18. It reached its final peak of 13 the following week. The song spent nine weeks on the chart in total. "Fly" entered the Australian Singles Chart at number 38 on September 18, 2011. The following week, it rose to number 23, and reached its peak of 18 in its third week. The song spent a total of nine weeks on the chart. It earned a Platinum certification from the Australian Recording Industry Association, denoting sales of 70,000 copies.

Following its release as a single in the United States, "Fly" reached number 19 on the Billboard Hot 100 on the issue dated December 10, 2011. The position marked Minaj's fourth top 20 of her career on the chart. The song also reached number 20 on the US Hot R&B/Hip-Hop Songs chart, becoming Minaj's sixth top 20 song on the chart. On the Mainstream Top 40 chart, "Fly" reached number 16, marking only Minaj's third song to reach the top 20, following "Moment 4 Life" (featuring Drake) and "Super Bass" earlier the same year. The song also charted on the Hot Dance/Club Songs chart at number 47, becoming Minaj's second song to appear on the chart following "Super Bass". As of December 2014, "Fly" has sold over 1.5 million copies in the United States. "Fly" made an appearance on the Canadian Hot 100 at number 55.

"Fly" entered the top 40 of the UK Singles Chart at number 38 on September 17, 2011, after placing at number 67 the previous week. The following week it rose to number 26. It reached its top 20 peak at number 16 on October 15, 2011, after seven weeks on the chart. The peak marked Minaj's second-highest charting song on the chart as a lead artist, and sixth top 20 overall. "Fly" also peaked at number three the UK R&B Chart. It also reached the top twenty in the Republic of Ireland.

== Music video ==
=== Background ===
A music video for the song was shot the weekend of January 7, 2011 and directed by Sanaa Hamri. "Fly" was the second music video to be shot in a string of music videos Minaj announced to be shot for promotion, along with "Save Me" and "Girls Fall Like Dominoes". Minaj and Rihanna both shared behind the scenes photos of the music video on Twitter, where Rihanna sported straight red hair and Minaj wore a curly black wig and a barbed pink dress. In an interview with E! Online, Minaj spoke briefly about the concept stating, "We're going to save the world in more ways than one with the video and that's all I can say about that." In an interview with BBC Radio's Tim Westwood, Minaj spoke very highly about the upcoming video, stating "The video is done. The 'Fly' video is a freakin' movie! Movie! Movie! Cinematic popcorn." In a blog from Minaj's website, she stated that the video for "Fly" had been pushed back, but it would be released soon. The video was filmed at Universal Studios Hollywood on the plane crash set used for War of the Worlds.

In an interview with MTV News, Minaj discussed the song's video and official release from the album. She stated that the video's release date and official single release would take place sometime around Memorial Day weekend, as she did not want to interfere with Rihanna's releases circulating the radio and wanted to allow time for both artists to promote each other's respective album before the collaboration was officially released. She added "So she has a lot of [songs] in rotation and I want to let her stuff have a moment and do its thing, dominate radio. [Instead], I wanted to come out with something more fun." A preview of the video was previewed first time at the 2011 MTV Video Music Awards pre-show. The preview consisted of Minaj and Rihanna in a foggy area, with Minaj having a pixie cut and Rihanna having long hair, seemingly switching hairstyles. The full "Fly" music video premiered on mtv.com and Minaj's Vevo after the preview on VMA's Pre-Show on August 28, 2011.

=== Synopsis ===
A scene from the video with Rihanna (left) and Nicki Minaj (right)

The video begins with a Jaguar XKR driving through the wreckage of a post-apocalyptic landscape. Part way through it cuts to a shot of the sky, with the sun blocked out by clouds. The video then returns to the car which has stopped and the roof retreats to the back of the car. The song begins as Minaj steps out wearing a strange, pink barbed dress, thigh-high cowboy boots and big curly hair. Minaj begins her verse whilst walking through the wreckage, and as her verse finishes she is joined by Rihanna who sings the second chorus, wearing a black dress, with straight red hair. As the second verse begins the video switches to a scene where we see Minaj standing on the wing of a crashed plane, this time sporting a pink bob-style wig and lilac dress. For the third chorus we see Rihanna and Minaj together again standing amongst the wreckage in a night time scene, with Rihanna wearing a white long-sleeved straight jacket, and Minaj with leopard print style hair and a baby dress. As Minaj begins her third verse the scenes alternate between the current scene and one where we see Minaj, wearing a white cat suit and White Tiger print hair style, standing on at the top of some steps. As she walks down, ninjas start appearing from over either side of the stair railings and attacking her. Minaj surprisingly defeats all her opponents, in what is a slightly extended version of the third verse compared to the album version of the song. This scene also alternates with the scene where Minaj is on the plane wing. On the last chorus the video alternates between the plane wing scene and the scene with Rihanna and Minaj whimpering amongst the wreckage. As the video comes to an end, plant life begins to grow around and over the wreckage. The video finishes by returning to the shot of the sky, where now the sun can be seen exploding between the clouds.

=== Reception ===
A writer of The Huffington Post commented that the video for "Fly" was "dramatic, [and] disaster-focused". The Boombox praised the fashion and the out-fits Minaj and Rihanna wore during the video. MTV News' Jocelyn Vena also praised the fashion in the video and added: "[It] plays out like some post-apocalyptic fashion magazine photo shoot in which Nicki Minaj and Rihanna stand near a plane wreck in couture outfits, mugging for the camera."

== In popular culture ==
- American musical TV series Glee, performed a version of the song in episode fourteen of season three, "On My Way" (aired on February 21, 2012). It is a mash-up track with the song "I Believe I Can Fly" by R. Kelly.

== Credits ==
Credits adapted from the liner notes of Pink Friday.

- Vocals - Nicki Minaj, Rihanna
- Production – J.R. Rotem
- Vocal recording – Aerial Chobaz and Charles Moniz
- Assistant vocal recording – Lyttleton "Cartwheel" Carter
- Mixing – Aerial Chobaz, Charles Moniz Lyttleton "Cartwheel" Carter
- Instrumentation – J.R. Rotem
- Guitar – Kevin Hissink

== Charts ==
Chart performance for "Fly"
Chart (2011–2013)	Peak position
Australia (ARIA)	18
Belgium (Ultratip Bubbling Under Flanders)	24
Brazil (Billboard Brasil Hot 100)	89
Brazil Hot Pop Songs	59
Canada Hot 100 (Billboard)	55
Canada CHR/Top 40 (Billboard)	35
France (SNEP)	46
Ireland (IRMA)	14
New Zealand (Recorded Music NZ)	13
Scottish Singles Sales (Official Charts)	12
UK Singles (Official Charts)	16
UK Hip Hop/R&B (Official Charts)	3
US Billboard Hot 100	19
US Dance Airplay (Billboard)	20
US Dance Club Songs (Billboard)	47
US Hot R&B/Hip-Hop Songs (Billboard)	20
US Hot Rap Songs (Billboard)	9
US Pop Airplay (Billboard)	16
US Rhythmic Airplay (Billboard)	8

== Certifications ==
Certifications for "Fly"
Region	Certification	Certified units/sales
Australia (ARIA)	2× Platinum	140,000^{‡}
New Zealand (RMNZ)	Platinum	15,000^{*}
United Kingdom (BPI)	Gold	400,000^{‡}
United States (RIAA)	Platinum	1,500,000
^{*} Sales figures based on certification alone.^{‡} Sales+streaming figures based on certification alone.

== Release history ==
"Fly" release history
Region	Date	Format	Labels	Ref.
United States	August 30, 2011	Rhythmic contemporary radio	Young Money; Cash Money; Universal Republic	
Australia	September 5, 2011	Contemporary hit radio	UNI; Universal Australia	
United States	September 20, 2011	Contemporary hit radio	Young Money; Cash Money; Universal Republic	
