= Best Friends (Froggy Fresh song) =

Single by Froggy Fresh

from the album Money Maker (Reloaded)
- Released: May 31, 2012
- Recorded: May 2012
- Genre: Hip hop
- Length: 3:22
- Songwriter(s): Froggy Fresh

Froggy Fresh singles chronology
"Haters Wanna Be Me" (2012)	"Best Friends" (2012)	"Girl Work It" (2012)

"Best Friends" is a song by rapper Froggy Fresh from his debut album, Money Maker (Re-Loaded). It was originally released on May 31, 2012, under the name Krispy Kreme. The song was accompanied by a music video, just as "The Baddest", and all other of Froggy's songs. The video, Froggy's third overall, has accumulated over 6.5 million views, as of December 1, 2013.

== Release ==
"Best Friends" was released following "The Baddest", and "Haters Wanna Be Me". Both of the preceding songs thrust Froggy into the spotlight.

== Music video ==
The music video depicted the friendship between Froggy Fresh, and Money Maker Mike. It also displays the "beef" that Mike has with the main antagonist of Froggy's raps, James. James, a drug lord, kidnaps Mike. This propels Froggy to salvage his friendship, by rescuing Mike.

== Reception ==
The music video, just as Froggy's previous two, as well as his subsequent videos, went viral, being featured on Complex, and CollegeHumor, among other online publications.

One source used the video as a criticism and point to determine that Froggy is a troll.

The video was highlighted for having a more serious tone than his previous works. Froggy's shout out to rapper Tupac Shakur, at the end of the song, was also heavily noted.
