= Roahn Hylton =

American hip-hop producer

- Also known as: First Born
- Born: Roahn Hylton; Houston, Texas, United States
- Genres: Hip hop, R&B, pop
- Occupations: Record producer, songwriter, engineer
- Years active: 2005–present
- Label: Sony/ATV Music Publishing

Roahn Hylton, known as "First Born", is a Hip-Hop, R&B, and Pop music producer from Houston, Texas. He attended Oral Roberts University before becoming a professional music producer. First Born was a co-producer with Kane Beatz on Nicki Minaj’s first Billboard Top 5 single "Super Bass". In addition to the song being a platinum hit in the U.S., "Super Bass" spent several weeks inside the top 20 and is Minaj's highest charting solo single to date. First Born has also worked with Flo Rida, Plies, Ne-Yo, Trey Songz, Kaleena, Ludacris, Cassie, Ariana Grande, The Game, Gucci, and New Boys. Additional projects Hylton has worked on include Shonlock's LP Never Odd or Even and Darrell Vanzant's Broken: A Musical.

In 2019, Hylton and Jacob Yoffee created the original score for the Amazon.com docuseries Free Meek, about rapper Meek Mill's battle to free himself from the criminal justice system.

== Discography ==
- "Make a Wish" - Flo Rida's Mail on Sunday (Best Buy Bonus Track) (2008)
- "Super Bass" - Nicki Minaj's Pink Friday Deluxe Edition (2010)
- "I Don't Care" - New Boyz's Too Cool to Care (2011)
- "Can't Nobody" - New Boyz's Too Cool to Care (2011)
- “Honeymoon Avenue” - Ariana Grande’s Yours Truly
