= Sophia Grace & Rosie =

British duo-singers

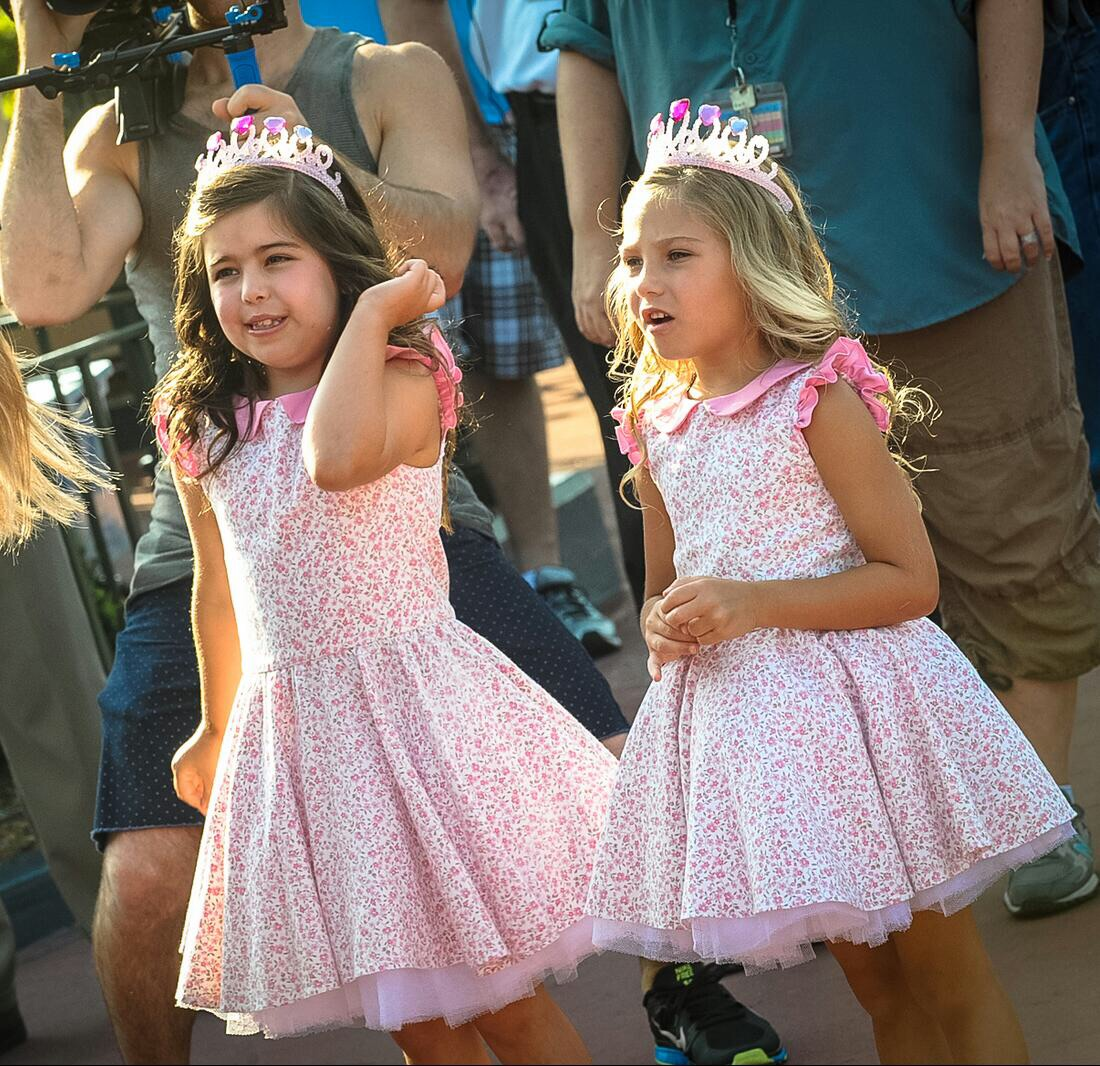
- Sophia Grace (left) and Rosie (right) in 2013

Background information
- Born: Sophia Grace Brownlee; 18 April 2003 (age 23); Rosie McClelland; 7 September 2006 (age 20)
- Origin: Harlow, Essex, England
- Genres: Pop-rap; pop
- Years active: 2011–present
- Label: Capitol Records France
- Members: Sophia Grace Brownlee; Rosie McClelland

Sophia Grace & Rosie are an English duo of singers, actresses and internet personalities. The duo was formed by Sophia Grace Brownlee and Rosie McClelland in October 2011, when they were aged eight and five respectively. They garnered popularity by making regular appearances on The Ellen DeGeneres Show, after posting a cover version of the Nicki Minaj song "Super Bass" that became popular on YouTube. The video was posted to YouTube in October 2011 and has garnered more than 151 million views as of November 2024.

Sophia Grace Brownlee debuted with her solo single "Girls Just Gotta Have Fun" in 2013, followed by the single "Best Friends" in late 2014, the latter of which charted on the Billboard Hot 100. The music videos for each single appear on her official YouTube channel. As of May 2022, "Girls Just Gotta Have Fun" has more than 239 million views. After signing a recording deal with Capitol Records France, she released her third single "Girl in the Mirror" on iTunes in 2016 featuring rapper Silentó, along with its accompanying music video. Grace started a YouTube channel centered around her life and started uploading vlogs and song covers. In May 2018, McClelland released her first solo single "Handstand."

== The Ellen DeGeneres Show ==
Brownlee and McClelland were first invited onto The Ellen DeGeneres Show in October 2011, after Ellen DeGeneres saw their cover of "Super Bass" by Nicki Minaj on YouTube. Brownlee and McClelland, then eight and five years old respectively, became recurring cast members on the show. The girls eventually hosted their own segment, called "Tea Time with Sophia Grace & Rosie". In the segment, the duo invited guests over for tea and interviewed them. Guests included Miley Cyrus, Taylor Swift, Katy Perry, Hugh Grant, Julie Bowen, Harry Connick Jr., LL Cool J, Justin Bieber, and Reese Witherspoon. The segment won Grace and McClelland the "Choice Webstar" at the 2012 Teen Choice Awards. They were also correspondents during red carpet events, such as the Grammy Awards, the American Music Awards, the Billboard Music Awards and the MTV Video Music Awards.

Brownlee and McClelland both reappeared on Ellen in May 2022, their first appearance on the show in over 6 years, where they performed "Super Bass" together again, discussed the background behind going viral, plans for the future, and their new music releases.

== Other TV and film appearances ==
Brownlee and McClelland appeared in two episodes of Sam & Cat, the third episode ("#TheBritBrats") and the eleventh episode ("#RevengeOfTheBritBrats"). In early August 2013, Brownlee's representatives announced that she had been cast as Little Red Riding Hood in the Disney movie adaptation of Into the Woods. The announcement of her casting, which was never confirmed by Disney, was criticised as "a stunt" and was met with concern due to her age and the sexual undertones present between Little Red Riding Hood and the Wolf. On 16 September 2013, the BroadwayWorld website announced that the film had "kicked off production last week" with Broadway star Lilla Crawford playing Little Red.

After the film's cast list was announced, Dominic Brownlee explained that Brownlee had withdrawn from the movie, saying, "After careful consideration, we as parents felt, as rehearsals progressed, that she was too young for this part. It was a joint decision between us and the director and producer of Into the Woods, to withdraw Sophia Grace from the film".

Brownlee and McClelland starred together in the 2014 film Sophia Grace & Rosie's Royal Adventure directed by Brian Levant. The film was a straight-to-DVD release produced by Nickelodeon. According to TMZ, Brownlee was paid around $50,000 for the film; a five-picture deal signed by the cousins states that the older will earn $75,000 if a second and third installment are released, and $100,000 each for a possible fourth and fifth installment.

In 2017, Brownlee began starring as a judge on the ABC reality series The Toy Box. However, she did not return for the second season.

== Books ==
Brownlee and McClelland have published two illustrated story books. The first book, entitled Tea Time with Sophia Grace & Rosie, was published 1 February 2013. It debuted at No. 2 on The New York Times Best Seller list of "Children's Picture Books", only outsold by Victoria Kann's Emeraldalicious (Pinkalicious). The second book, Show Time with Sophia Grace & Rosie, was published on 25 March 2014, and also received commercial and critical success, like its predecessor. Both books were written by both Brownlee and McClelland and illustrated by Shelagh McNicholas. They were published by Orchard Books.

== Singing dolls ==
In April 2014, Just Play launched a two-doll pack containing two dolls of both Brownlee and McClelland. They were sold exclusively at Walmart stores for the first month, until made available at Claire's in May.

== Personal lives ==
Brownlee has three children; a son, born 26 February 2023, and two daughters, born 29 December 2024 and 4 October 2026.

== Discography ==
=== Singles ===
Sophia Grace
Year	Title	Peak chart positions	Writer(s)	Producer(s)	Length
Year	Title	US	Writer(s)	Producer(s)	Length
2013	"Girls Just Gotta Have Fun"	—	—N/a	Michael Busalacchi; Kelvin Craver	3:34
2014	"Best Friends"	87	Hi W. Jackson; Dominic Brownlee	Donald Sales; Da Beatfreakz	3:53
2016	"Girl in the Mirror" (featuring Silentó)	—	Dominic Brownlee; Silentó; K Nita; Emile Ghantous; Keith Hetrick	Emile Ghantous; Keith Hetrick	3:38
2017	"Hollywood"	—	—N/a	—N/a	3:00
2017	"Got 2 Be"	—	—N/a	—N/a	2:54
2017	"UK Girl"	—	—N/a	—N/a	3:20
2017	"Why U Mad"	—	—N/a	—N/a	2:48
2018	"Number 1" (featuring AJ & Deno)	—	—N/a	—N/a	3:25
2018	"Can't Sleep"	—	Shaun Barrett; Naweed	Sophia Grace; Berynia Aigbe; Jahmahl Elliott	3:41
2019	"My Zone" (#MostWanted Sav & Sophia Grace)	—	—N/a	Br!dge	2:56
2022	"Little Things"	—	Sophia Grace; Anthony Dixon; Patrick Smith	Anthony Dixon	2:34
Rosie McClelland
2018	"Handstand"	—	—N/a	—N/a	3:06
2019	"LaLa"	—	—N/a	—N/a	3:23
2020	"Tik Tok"	—	Alawn; Lauren Dyson	Alawn	2:44
2020	"Girls"	—	Alawn; Lauren Dyson; Taylor Jones	Alawn	2:38
2021	"Throw It Away"	—	KC; Alawn; Taylor Jones	Alawn	2:48
2021	"Ready for Love"	—	Lauren Dyson; Taylor Jones	Alawn	3:13
2022	"Safe in Your Love"	—	Lauren Dyson; Harold Philippon	Alawn	2:53
2023	"Hurts So Good"	—	Alawn; Lauren Dyson; Harold Philippon	Alawn	3:22
2024	"No Lie"	—	—N/a	—N/a	3:32
2025	"HeadRush"	—	Chelsea Balan; Matthew Chirichillo; Maia Kelly; Rosie McClelland; Jordan Richman	Jordan Richman; Matthew Chirichillo	2:51
2025	"Make It Through"	—	Rosie McClelland; Rosie Shaw; Liam McCluskey	Liam McCluskey	2:38
2025	"In a State"	—	Rosie McClelland; Jordan Richman; Liv Miraldi	Jordan Richman	3:07
2025	"P.O.V."	—	Rosie McClelland; Charlotte Boyle; Liam McCluskey	Liam McCluskey	2:35
2025	"Speeding"	—	Rosie McClelland; Naila; Liam McCluskey	Liam McCluskey	2:42
