= Did It On'em =

2011 single by Nicki Minaj

Single by Nicki Minaj

from the album Pink Friday
- Released: April 7, 2011
- Recorded: April 2010
- Studio: Glenwood Place Studios (Burbank, CA)
- Genre: Hip hop
- Length: 3:32
- Label: Young Money; Cash Money
- Songwriters: O. Maraj; Shondrae Crawford; J. Ellington; Safaree Samuels
- Producer: Bangladesh

Nicki Minaj singles chronology
"Super Bass" (2011)	"Did It On'em" (2011)	"Girls Fall Like Dominoes" (2011)

Music video
- "Did It On Em" on YouTube

"Did It On'em" is a song by rapper Nicki Minaj from her debut studio album, Pink Friday (2010). It was released on April 7, 2011 by Young Money and Cash Money as the sixth single from the album. It was written by Minaj, producer Shondrae "Bangladesh" Crawford, and J. Ellington.

"Did It On'em" is a hip hop song driven by a distinct beat and synths, with lyrics of Minaj winning over detractors. The song reached number 45 on the US Billboard Hot 100, number three on the US R&B/Hip-Hop Songs and number four on US Rap Songs charts. It is certified gold in the US, as well as Australia and New Zealand. A music video was released for the track, featuring Minaj behind-the-scenes and performing on the I Am Still Music Tour.

== Composition ==
"Did It On'em" is a hip hop song that has instrumentally been described as having a massive, ungainly beat. Producer Bangladesh creates hi-hats that have been described as on overdrive. The synths on the track have been described as a "whirring synth drone" and blowing up like "a car-alarm siren". One of Minaj's more lyrically explicit songs from the album, the lyrics speak of Minaj winning over haters, with phrases such as saying she "shitted on 'em", "pissed on 'em", and with an imagined "dick" she would "piss" on them. The song also references Cher and her 1989 single "If I Could Turn Back Time", rhyming "Cher" with the depilatory brand Nair. Brad Wete of Entertainment Weekly said Minaj was "ordering her Barbies to put up two fingers if they're crapping on their competition."

== Reception ==
Scott Plagenhoef of Pitchfork named "Did It On'em" the album's best track as it features Minaj going "toe-to-toe with a huge beat." Additionally from Pitchfork, Tom Breihan said it displays "how beautifully, effortlessly weird she is-- how willing she is to contort her voice and persona into pretzel shapes just to induce that oh-shit face in anyone listening." Margaret Wappler of Los Angeles Times called the song "aggressively scatological". Writing for Spin, Marc Hogan said it features Minaj's "best rapping". Sam Wolfson of NME described the track as a "post-dubstep cry" with vulgarity that may place Minaj on the "Teen Choice Awards blacklist". In a list of the "50 Best songs of 2010" by Rolling Stone, "Did It On'em" came in a number 25, with the magazine deeming it a "hazy, synapse-butchering throwdown."

In November 2011, after a fan brought the Cher reference to her attention on Twitter, Cher exchanged tweets with Minaj and her then-boyfriend Safaree Samuels, initially dismissing the line before apologizing for reacting defensively; all parties later deleted the tweets.

== Chart performance ==
The song peaked at number 45 on the US Billboard Hot 100 and spent 16 weeks on the chart. It also peaked in the top five of the Billboard component charts Hot R&B/Hip-Hop Songs and Rap Songs, reaching number three on the former and number four on the latter.

== Music video ==
In April 2011, during an interview with KIIS-FM's DJ JoJo, Minaj revealed that she had shot a music video for "Did It On'em". The following month, the video's director DJ Scoob Doo stated that he and Minaj pieced the video together within two weeks.

The video premiered exclusively to fans with accounts on Minaj's official website on May 27, 2011, and later premiered worldwide. It includes clips from the I Am Still Music Tour, Minaj performing the track on stage, backstage moments with Young Money artists Drake and Lil' Wayne, candids of past photo shoots, and magazine photo shoots cut together with footage of Minaj signing fans' chests. Minaj stated the video was a gesture of gratitude to her fans for their support for her on the I Am Still Music Tour.

== Credits and personnel ==
Credits are taken from Pink Friday liner notes.

- Nicki Minaj – vocals
- Shondrae "Bangladesh" Crawford – producer
- Safaree Samuels - additional vocals

== Charts ==
=== Weekly charts ===
Chart (2011)	Peak position
US Billboard Hot 100	49
US Hot R&B/Hip-Hop Songs (Billboard)	3
US Hot Rap Songs (Billboard)	4
US Rhythmic Airplay (Billboard)	13

=== Year-end charts ===
Chart (2011)	Position
US Hot R&B/Hip-Hop Songs (Billboard)	28

== Certifications ==
Region	Certification	Certified units/sales
Australia (ARIA)	Gold	35,000^{‡}
New Zealand (RMNZ)	Gold	15,000^{‡}
United States (RIAA)	Gold	500,000^{*}
^{*} Sales figures based on certification alone.^{‡} Sales+streaming figures based on certification alone.

== Release history ==
Country	Date	Type
United States	April 7, 2011	Rhythm/Crossover and Urban airplay
