= Girls Fall Like Dominoes =

Single by Nicki Minaj

from the album Pink Friday (Deluxe)
- Released: April 11, 2011
- Recorded: 2010
- Genre: Hip hop • electropop
- Length: 3:44 (album version); 3:22 (radio edit)
- Label: Young Money; Cash Money; Universal-Island
- Songwriters: Onika Maraj; J.R. Rotem; Robbie Furze; Millo Cordell; Cleveland Browne; Greville Gordon; Wycliffe Johnson
- Producer: J.R. Rotem

Nicki Minaj singles chronology
"Did It On'em" (2011)	"Girls Fall Like Dominoes" (2011)	"Where Them Girls At" (2011)

Audio video
- "Nicki Minaj - Girls Fall Like Dominoes (Official Audio)" on YouTube

"Girls Fall Like Dominoes" is a song by rapper Nicki Minaj. It serves as the seventh single from some deluxe editions of her debut album Pink Friday (2010). The song's chorus is sampled from "Dominos", a 2009 single by British indie rock band The Big Pink. "Girls Fall Like Dominoes" was originally released as an international iTunes Store bonus track on Minaj's debut album, Pink Friday; however it was released later on all editions of the album in the United Kingdom on March 11, 2011. The single was released on April 11, 2011 in Australia. It was released on April 15, 2011 as the fourth UK single after "Moment 4 Life". "Girls Fall Like Dominoes" became a top 20 hit in New Zealand, reaching number 13.

The song was written by Nicki Minaj herself, J.R. Rotem, Robbie Furze, Millo Cordell, Cleveland Browne, Greville Gordon and Wycliffe Johnson, and was produced by J. R. Rotem. The song also contains interpolations of "Trailar Load a Girls". After the release of the track, it debuted at number thirty-two in the United Kingdom.

== Background and composition ==
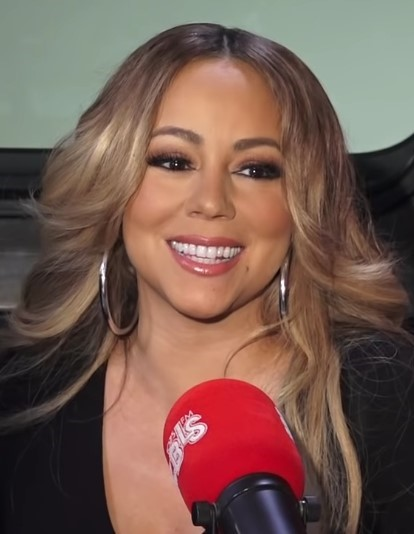
Mariah Carey is one of many women Minaj mentions on the track

"Girls Fall Like Dominoes was released as an iTunes Store bonus track during the release of Pink Friday. The song was later included on the album's official track listing during the UK re-release of the album.

Produced by J.R. Rotem, "Girls Fall Like Dominoes" has been described as a "jubilant, poppy song." Lyrically, Minaj raps about how she is hot enough to steal the fans of male rappers, in this case Lil Wayne and Drake. Minaj name checks many women in the entertainment industry, including Kristin Cavallari, Kourtney Kardashian, M.I.A., Mo'Nique, Angelina Jolie, Madonna, Donatella Versace, Wilhelmina Cooper, Beyoncé, Mariah Carey, Rihanna, Kim Kardashian, Khloé Kardashian, Ciara, Keri Hilson and Grace Jones. She also mentions Al Pacino.

As Rotem creates characteristically colossal chords, Minaj discusses her love for women. Rotem's production on the song has been described as diabolically catchy and synth-drenched. "Girls Fall Like Dominoes" samples "Dominos" from British band the Big Pink.

== Critical reception ==
With a three and a half out of five star-rating, DJBooth stated that the song is exactly what one would expect from a Minaj and Rotem collaboration and that fellas should be warned. Dan Martin of NME placed "Girls Fall Like Dominoes" at number two on a list of "10 Tracks You Have To Hear", adding that Minaj upgrades the original classic that is sampled in the song.

== Chart performance ==
"Girls Falls like Dominoes" first charted on the UK Singles Charts at number 54, and in the UK Urban chart at 12. In its second week it appeared at numbers 32 and 8, becoming Minaj's third UK Top 40 single, and second Top 10 UK Urban song. A week later, the single charted at number 24. The song debuted at number ten on the UK R&B Chart, marking her fourth top 30 urban single. The single gained a new peak on the UK R&B Chart, peaking at number eight. The single also debuted at number 50 on the Irish Singles Charts, peaking at 28, her third top 40 single in that country. Girls Fall Like Dominoes also charted in Scotland, charting at 27, making it her second top 30 single in that country also.

== Track listing ==
UK Digital single

1. "Girls Fall Like Dominoes" (Radio Edit) – 3:22
2. "Girls Fall Like Dominoes" (Distance Remix) – 3:50

== Charts ==
Chart (2011)	Peak position
Australia (ARIA)	99
Australia Urban (ARIA)	30
Ireland (IRMA)	28
New Zealand (Recorded Music NZ)	13
Scotland Singles (OCC)	27
UK Singles (OCC)	24
UK Hip Hop/R&B (OCC)	8

== Radio and release history ==
Country	Date	Type
Australia	April 11, 2011	Digital download
New Zealand	April 11, 2011	Digital download
United Kingdom	April 13, 2011	Radio airplay (BBC Radio 1)
United Kingdom	April 15, 2011	Digital download
