= Best of Friends (disambiguation) =

Best of Friends is a British children's television programme that aired between 2004 and 2008.

(The) Best of Friends may also refer to:

== Theatre and books ==
- The Best of Friends (play), a 1987 epistolary play by Hugh Whitemore
- The Best of Friends, a 1902 play by Cecil Raleigh
- The Best of Friends, a 1972 novel by Joy Fielding

== Film and television ==
- The Best of Friends (film), a 1982 Australian romantic comedy
- "Best of Friends," an episode of the TV series Eight Is Enough
- "Best of Friends / Aftermath / Dream Boat," an episode of the TV series The Love Boat
- "Best of Friends," an episode of the TV series Night Court

== Music ==
=== Albums ===
- The Best of Friends (album), a compilation album by Loggins and Messina
- Best of Friends, an album by The Smurfs nominated for Grammy Award for Best Album for Children, 1983
- Best of Friends (Twennynine album), 1979
- Best of Friends, a 2007 album by Jools Holland
- Best of Friends, a 1984 album by Tom Paxton, Anne Hills & Bob Gibson
- The Best of Friends, an album by John Lee Hooker

=== Songs ===
- "Best of Friends," a song from the Disney film The Fox and the Hound
- "Best of Friends," a song by Joan Baez from the album Where Are You Now, My Son?
- "Best of Friends," a song by Palma Violets from the album 180
- "Best of Friends," a song by The Rowans from the album Jubilation
- "Best of Friends," the theme song to the TV series Simon & Simon, performed by the Thrasher Brothers
- "Best of Friends", a duet by Livingston Taylor and Carly Simon on the former's album There You Are Again
- "Best of Friends", a song by Peter, Paul and Mary from their Reunion album

== See also ==
- Best of Enemies (disambiguation)
- Best Friend (disambiguation)
