= Best of Enemies =

Best of Enemies may refer to:

== Films ==
- Best of Enemies (1933 film), an American comedy film
- Best of Enemies (2015 film), an American documentary film
- Best of Enemies, alternate title of The Girls' Room, a 2000 American comedy-drama film
- The Best of Enemies (1961 film), a British-Italian comedy film
- The Best of Enemies (2019 film), an American drama film

== Other ==
- Best of Enemies (novel), a 1991 Nancy Drew & Hardy Boys mystery novel
- Best of Enemies (play), a 2021 play by James Graham
- Best of Enemies (TV series), a 1968 British comedy series
- Best of Enemies: A History of US and Middle East Relations, a 2012 graphic novel drawn by David Beauchard
- The Best of Enemies: Race and Redemption in the New South, a 1996 non-fiction book by Osha Gray Davidson

== See also ==
- Best of Friends (disambiguation)
