= Super Bass =

2011 single by Nicki Minaj

Single by Nicki Minaj

from the album Pink Friday
- B-side: "Moment 4 Life"
- Released: April 5, 2011
- Recorded: 2010
- Studio: Glenwood Place Studios (Burbank, CA)
- Genre: Pop rap; electropop
- Length: 3:20
- Label: Young Money; Cash Money; Universal Motown
- Songwriters: Onika Maraj; Daniel Johnson; Esther Dean; Roahn Hylton; Jeremy Coleman
- Producers: Kane Beatz; JMIKE

Nicki Minaj singles chronology
"The Creep" (2011)	"Super Bass" (2011)	"Did It On'em" (2011)

Music video
- "Super Bass" on YouTube

"Super Bass" is a song by Trinidadian rapper Nicki Minaj from the deluxe version of her debut studio album, Pink Friday (2010). It was sent to American rhythmic radio stations as the album's fifth single on April 5, 2011. The song was written by Minaj alongside Ester Dean (who provides additional vocals), Roahn Hylton, and producers Kane Beatz and JMIKE. According to Minaj, the song's lyrics detail the story of a playful romance between her and a potential suitor. The pop rap track contains electronic influences, while Minaj raps over a hip hop beat. An accompanying music video for the single was shot in March 2011 by director Sanaa Hamri and shows Minaj playfully taunting a group of men; while making use of multiple props colored bubblegum pink.

"Super Bass" peaked at number three on the US Billboard Hot 100, and number eight on the UK Singles Chart. It also charted within the top-ten in Australia, Belgium, Canada, New Zealand, and Scotland. In the United States, it has sold over five million digital downloads as of December 2014. In November 2021, "Super Bass" was certified Diamond by the Recording Industry Association of America (RIAA), for selling 10 million equivalent units in the US. The track is certified 11-times platinum in Australia, double platinum in Norway and the United Kingdom, and platinum in New Zealand. Billboard ranked it at number 94 on its Hot 100 decade-end chart of the 2010s; it is Minaj's first and only song to appear on the ranking. The song received positive reviews from music critics upon release. Billboard placed "Super Bass" on their "100 Songs That Defined the Decade" list, and later ranked it number 13 on their list of the "500 Best Pop Songs of All Time". The song has also appeared on Rolling Stone's "500 Best Songs of All Time" list.

== Composition ==
"Super Bass"
"Super Bass" blends electronic music and pop over a hip-hop beat.

"Super Bass" was co-written by Minaj, Ester Dean, Roahn Hylton, and Daniel "Kane Beatz" Johnson, who produced the song alongside JMIKE. While being interviewed by MTV News during the video shoot for the single, Minaj explained the song's concept, stating: "'Super Bass' is about the boy that you are crushing over, [...] And you kind of want to get your mack on, but you're taking the playful approach." The song utilizes electronic music, electropop, and pop-rap in its composition, while Minaj raps over a hip hop drum beat, while also infusing elements of J-pop combined with an upbeat hook. It uses a busy beat that is interspersed with digital rain drop sound effects and strong bass. Minaj's vocals in the song have been described as "breathy". "Super Bass" is written in the key of G-sharp minor with a moderate tempo of 127 beats per minute. Minaj's lyrics in the song are often provocative and suggestive, with lines like "He just gotta give me that look, when he give me that look / Then the panties comin' off, off, uh" and a catchy onomatopoetic refrain: "Boom, badoom, boom, boom, badoom, boom, bass, he got dat super bass".

Brad Wete of Entertainment Weekly stated that the song describes Minaj's type of man as "one who hits the gym often and has first-class... money" as she states: "He pops bottles and he’s got the right kind of build.... He’s always in the air / But he never flies coach". Charley Rogulewski of AOL's The Boombox stated that "the uber-catchy 'boom, badoom, boom, boom' chorus makes 'Super Bass' the most pop-friendly Minaj song released to radio [sic] yet". Described as a lighter side to Minaj by Jessica Sinclair of Long Island Press, the song gets more in-depth with a little more pop and an upbeat hook that "really sticks"; however, Minaj still assists the song's pop edge with "crazy rapping skills".

== Critical reception ==
Wesley Case of The Baltimore Sun gave the song a positive review, stating that was it an "obvious hit". He compared the song to the rest of Pink Friday, stating that it is much more potent as compared to the rest of the album. Case later added: "Pink Friday is short on memorable hooks, but 'Super Bass' is an exception". Rap-Up described the tune as "infectious". Jessica Sinclair of Long Island Press complimented Nicki Minaj for taking "center stage" on the song, due to her solo performance, and added that in doing so Minaj created a success. Sinclair additionally commented on the song as a lighter side to Minaj, and complimented the hook as upbeat and added that it "really sticks". Rosie Gray of BlackBook complimented the song as a "killer". Alex Pielak of Metro compared Minaj's "Super Bass" to Beyoncé's "Move Your Body", stating that: "Nicki wins for the sheer number of words she's managed to cram in – and therefore takes the face off".

Lewis Corner from Digital Spy gave the single four out of a possible five stars. Corner wrote that the song's chorus was "sharper than a Sherbet Dib Dab." Minaj's "eccentric rapping style" was praised in the review with Corner writing that the song was likely to become her first solo top ten hit in the United States or the United Kingdom. Claire Suddath of Time magazine named "Super Bass" one of the Top 10 Songs of 2011. As of January 2015, Billboard listed the song as one of "The 20 Best Songs of 2010s (So Far)".

Billboard writer, Tatiana Cirisano, stated that in 2011, Minaj was "one of the few mainstream female rappers ... thanks to her ability to bridging audience boundaries with genre-blending hits," which "established her as a pop superstar", and the song "both shaped and reflected the music and culture" of the mentioned year.

In 2022, Billboard named it the 7th Greatest karaoke song of all time. In 2023, Billboard named it the 13th Best Pop Song of All Time.

=== Accolades ===
Critics' decade-end lists
Publication	List	Rank	Ref.
NPR Music	The 200 Greatest Songs By 21st Century Women	15	
Billboard	Top 100 Songs Which Defined the 2010s Decade	—N/a	
Billboard	The 500 Best Pop Songs of All Time	13	
Billboard	Greatest Karaoke songs of all time	7	
NME	100 Greatest Songs of the 2010s	51	
Rolling Stone	500 Best Songs of All Time	426	
Billboard	500 Best Pop Songs of All Time	13	

== Commercial performance ==
On the week of May 14, 2011, "Super Bass" debuted on the US Billboard Hot 100 at position 98. The following week it rose 50 spots to number 48. On the week titled May 21, 2011, "Super Bass" debuted on the Hot Rap Songs and Hot Digital Songs charts at number 25 and 31 respectively. In its 14th week, the song reached a new peak at number three on the Hot 100, while also having longevity on the charts for 39 weeks until 2012; 38 of which were in the top 50, becoming Minaj's first top ten-hit. In Canada, "Super Bass" debuted on the Canadian Hot 100 at number 92 and peaked at number six. It was the highest-charting female rap song since "Work It" by Missy Elliott in 2002. "Super Bass" entered the UK Singles Chart at number 46 on May 21, 2011, and after nine non-consecutive weeks of moving up the chart, reached a peak of number eight on the chart for the week ending August 13, 2011. As of December 2014, the song has sold 5 million pure sales in the United States. As of November 2021, the song has sold 10 million equivalent units in the United States and has been certified diamond.

In Europe and Oceania, the song was a moderate success but reinforced Minaj's international recognition, reaching top ten in Belgium, Australia, Scotland, France and New Zealand, top twenty in Finland and Lebanon and top fifty in Austria and Sweden. "Super Bass" made an appearance in Switzerland and the Netherlands, becoming Minaj's first solo and second solo entry respectively.

== Music video ==
=== Background ===
"I just wanted to do something real colorful and cutesy. This is an icy world, it's a sexy world, it's a playful world. Of course I have lots of eye candy for my girls and my boys [...] We have a lot of little surprises in store for this particular video, [...] I would like to put out 50 videos. The videos really tell the story a lot more elaborately than just the song does."

— Minaj explaining the video's inspiration.

On March 10, 2011, Minaj revealed during an interview with MTV News that she was shooting a video for "Super Bass" with director Sanaa Hamri and producers: Kimberly S. Stuckwisch, Michelle Larkin & Keith "KB" Brown. She explained the video's concept, stating that she wanted the video to be full of eye candy and that she wanted it to be colorful. On April 26, 2011, Minaj premiered a sneak peek of the music video on BET's 106 & Park. The preview showed Minaj in a pink wig with similarly-clad backup dancers gyrating to the song, wearing a uniform of white tank tops, denim short shorts, different colored bras, and different colored work boots and the same laces.

Originally the video was set to premiere on the same show as where the preview was premiered on April 27, 2011, but instead was postponed. Minaj took to Twitter to explain that the music video has been pulled from the show and would not be premiering that date for unknown reasons. The music video instead premiered on Minaj's official Vevo account on May 5, 2011. As of April 2024, the music video has 1.02 billion views on YouTube.

=== Synopsis ===
A screenshot from the "Super Bass" music video

The music video begins with a close-up of Minaj as she opens her eyes and begins to blink as the song begins. As Minaj raps verses of the song, Barbie-approved props; a pink Ferrari, pink plane and a pink pool, are shown contemplating what Minaj is saying in the verse. Minaj then begins to playfully tease men as clips of ice-speakers and a motorcycle made of ice are interlaced into the scene. As the chorus begins, Minaj is seen performing choreography with five clones of herself. As the video continues, Minaj is seen in a green wig at a pool side with several well-built men, and then splashing with a man in the pool of pink water. Minaj then continues to ride the motorcycle made of ice while wearing a skintight pink bodysuit emblazoned with giraffe prints, a half-blond and pink wig, gold eye shadow and bright pink lipstick. Minaj then begins to reprise her lap dances in the dark, with black lights setting the glowing tone of the dancers, as Minaj glows in the dark with glowing lips, hair and makeup. She and her dancers play in feathers that are also glow in the dark towards the end of the video. The video closes with Safaree S.B. Samuels dancing beside her, and Minaj lit in the black lighting, biting her finger while laying across the lap of a male she gave a lapdance to in the video.

=== Critical reception and accolades ===
D.L. Chandler from Rapfix complimented the video's visuals writing, "it is a dazzling visual affair if nothing else". AOL music's Contessa Gayles reviewed the video, writing, "The highlight of the Sanaa Hamri-directed video? The glow-in-the-dark lap-dance scene." On the day of its premiere, Rap-Up complimented the video as "vibrant". Becky Bain of Idolator gave the song a positive review, comparing it to "Judas" stating, "Super Bass had the better choreography in an anxiously-awaited music video featuring a pop star riding a motorcycle released today. (Sorry, 'Judas')". United Kingdom's MTV found Minaj's signature lap dance "saucy" and complimented the clip's use of "hunky men" and "outrageous flirting". Brad Wete of Entertainment Weekly stated that there is plenty of "eye candy" for both men and women, stating that Minaj "ratchets up the sex appeal" in the clip. Wesley Case of The Baltimore Sun complimented the video as wildly stylized that "looks like a comic book come to life". At the 2011 MTV Video Music Awards, Minaj's video for "Super Bass" was nominated under the Best Female Video and Best Hip-Hop Video categories, winning the latter and gaining Minaj her first moonman.

== Live performances ==
"Super Bass" was performed live for the first time during the 2011 Billboard Music Awards on May 22, 2011. Minaj performed the song alongside David Guetta at the American Music Awards of 2011 on November 20, 2011, and also performed Guetta's song "Turn Me On", which Minaj was featured on. Minaj also performed the song on Dick Clark's New Year's Rockin' Eve with Ryan Seacrest and on the 2011 Victoria's Secret Fashion Show which aired on November 29, 2011 on CBS. The song was the encore song on Minaj's debut concert tour, the Pink Friday Tour. She also has performed the song on her Pink Friday: Reloaded Tour, The Pinkprint Tour, The Nicki Wrld Tour and as a closing-show for her Gag City Tour.

Minaj performed "Super Bass" at the 2014 MTV Europe Music Awards followed by "Bed of Lies" with Skylar Grey and "Anaconda". On May 30, 2015, Minaj also performed the song on the iHeartRadio Summer Pool Party 2015 in Las Vegas.

== Cover versions ==
"Super Bass" was covered by several artists and celebrities such as Taylor Swift, Selena Gomez, Kendall Jenner and Sophia Grace & Rosie who performed with Minaj on The Ellen DeGeneres Show after going viral on YouTube. MTV writer, Rob Markman, stated that "more than its chart positioning was the song's impact" citing various covers and renditions.

== Awards and nominations ==
Awards
Year	Ceremony	Category	Result	Ref.
2011	4Music Video Honours	Best Big Beat	Won	
2011	4Music Video Honours	Best Video	Nominated	
2011	MP3 Music Awards	Music Industry Choice Award	Won	
2011	MTV Video Music Awards	Best Female Video	Nominated	
2011	MTV Video Music Awards	Best Hip-Hop Video	Won	
2011	Teen Choice Awards	Choice Summer Song	Nominated	
2012	Billboard Music Awards	Top Rap Song	Nominated	
2012	Billboard Music Awards	Top Streaming Song (Audio)	Nominated	
2012	Billboard Music Awards	Top Streaming Song (Video)	Won	
2012	BMI Pop Awards	Award-Winning Song	Won	
2012	BMI R&B/Hip-Hop Awards	Song of the Year	Won	
2012	BMI R&B/Hip-Hop Awards	Award-Winning Song	Won	
2012	International Dance Music Awards	Best R&B/Urban Dance Track	Nominated	
2012	International Dance Music Awards	Best Rap/Hip Hop Dance Track	Won	
2012	MTV Platinum Video Plays Awards	Most-Played Music Video	Won	

== Track listing ==
- Digital download
1. "Super Bass" – 3:19
- US CD single
1. "Super Bass" – 3:21
2. "Moment 4 Life" – 4:39
- UK Promo CD single
1. "Super Bass" – 3:21

== Credits and personnel ==
Credits adapted from the liner notes of Pink Friday.

- Lead vocals & Songwriting – Nicki Minaj
- Background Vocals – Ester Dean
- Songwriting – Ester Dean, Daniel Johnson
- Production – Kane
- Recording – Ariel Chobaz
- Recording assistant – Lyttleton "Cartwheel" Carter

== Charts ==
=== Weekly charts ===
Chart (2011–2012)	Peak position
Australia (ARIA)	6
Australia Urban (ARIA)	2
Austria (Ö3 Austria Top 40)	42
Belgium (Ultratop 50 Flanders)	3
Canada Hot 100 (Billboard)	6
Canada CHR/Top 40 (Billboard)	4
Canada Hot AC (Billboard)	27
Euro Digital Song Sales (Billboard)	18
Finland (Suomen virallinen lista)	17
Ireland (IRMA)	17
Japan Hot 100 (Billboard)	89
Lebanon (The Official Lebanese Top 20)	16
Netherlands (Single Top 100)	82
New Zealand (Recorded Music NZ)	3
Scottish Singles Sales (Official Charts)	8
South Korea International Singles (Gaon)	40
Sweden (Sverigetopplistan)	43
Switzerland (Schweizer Hitparade)	58
UK Hip Hop/R&B (Official Charts)	3
UK Singles (Official Charts)	8
US Billboard Hot 100	3
US Adult Pop Airplay (Billboard)	33
US Dance Club Songs (Billboard)	23
US Hot R&B/Hip-Hop Songs (Billboard)	6
US Hot Rap Songs (Billboard)	2
US Pop Airplay (Billboard)	3
US Rhythmic Airplay (Billboard)	1

=== Year-end charts ===
Chart (2011)	Position
Australia (ARIA)	17
Canada (Canadian Hot 100)	29
New Zealand (RIANZ)	17
UK Singles (OCC)	29
US Billboard Hot 100	8
US Hot R&B/Hip-Hop Songs (Billboard)	42
US Mainstream Top 40 (Billboard)	9
US Rhythmic (Billboard)	5

Chart (2012)	Position
UK Singles (OCC)	189

=== Decade-end charts ===
Chart (2010–19)	Position
US Billboard Hot 100	94

== Certifications ==
Region	Certification	Certified units/sales
Australia (ARIA)	11× Platinum	770,000^{‡}
Brazil (Pro-Música Brasil)	3× Platinum	180,000^{‡}
Denmark (IFPI Danmark)	Platinum	90,000^{‡}
Germany (BVMI)	Gold	150,000^{‡}
Italy (FIMI)	Gold	50,000^{‡}
Japan (RIAJ)	Gold	100,000^{*}
New Zealand (RMNZ)	5× Platinum	150,000^{‡}
Norway (IFPI Norway)	2× Platinum	20,000^{‡}
United Kingdom (BPI)	3× Platinum	1,800,000^{‡}
United States (RIAA)	12× Platinum	12,000,000^{‡}
^{*} Sales figures based on certification alone.^{‡} Sales+streaming figures based on certification alone.

== Radio and release history ==
Country	Date	Format	Label
United States	April 5, 2011	Rhythmic contemporary	Young Money; Cash Money; Universal Motown
Australia	May 13, 2011	Digital download	Cash Money
New Zealand	May 13, 2011	Digital download	Cash Money
Germany	May 16, 2011	Digital download	Cash Money
United States	May 17, 2011	Contemporary hit radio	Young Money; Cash Money; Universal Motown
United States	June 20, 2011	Urban contemporary	Young Money; Cash Money

== See also ==
- List of highest-certified singles in Australia
