= Pink Friday =

2010 studio album by Nicki Minaj

Studio album by Nicki Minaj
- Released: November 22, 2010
- Recorded: 2009–2010
- Studios: 25 Sound (Detroit); Chalice (Los Angeles); Glenwood Place (Burbank)
- Genres: Hip-hop; pop; R&B
- Length: 50:46
- Labels: Cash Money; Young Money; Universal Motown
- Producers: Bangladesh; Blackout Movement; Drew Money; J. R. Rotem; Kane Beatz; Pop & Oak; Skyz Muzik; Swizz Beatz; T-Minus; will.i.am

Nicki Minaj album chronology
Beam Me Up Scotty (2009)	Pink Friday (2010)	Pink Friday: Roman Reloaded (2012)

Singles from Pink Friday
- 1. "Your Love" Released: June 1, 2010; 2. "Check It Out" Released: September 3, 2010; 3. "Right Thru Me" Released: September 24, 2010; 4. "Moment 4 Life" Released: December 7, 2010; 5. "Super Bass" Released: April 5, 2011; 6. "Did It On'em" Released: April 7, 2011; 7. "Fly" Released: August 30, 2011

Pink Friday is the debut studio album by the Trinidadian rapper and singer Nicki Minaj. It was released on November 22, 2010, by Cash Money Records, Young Money Entertainment and Universal Motown Records. Minaj began recording the album after signing a recording contract with Young Money Entertainment in 2009. Musically, it is primarily a hip-hop, pop and R&B album that incorporates elements of electronic music. The album features guest vocals from Eminem, Rihanna, Drake, will.i.am, Kanye West, and Natasha Bedingfield.

Pink Friday was promoted with three singles before its release: "Your Love", "Check It Out", and "Right Thru Me". "Moment 4 Life", "Did It On'em", and "Fly" followed. Five singles peaked within the top 40 on the US Billboard Hot 100, and the deluxe album's "Super Bass" peaked at number three on the chart. Pink Friday debuted at number two on the US Billboard 200, selling 375,000 copies in its first week, which marked the second highest sales debut ever for a female rapper after Lauryn Hill. It later peaked at number one, becoming Minaj's first number one album. Internationally, it charted within the top 20 in Australia, Canada, and the UK. In 2016, the album was certified 3× platinum by the Recording Industry Association of America (RIAA).

Pink Friday received generally positive reviews, with some critics ambivalent on Minaj's exploration of R&B and pop. It was nominated for Best Rap Album at the 54th Grammy Awards in 2012, alongside Minaj's other nominations for Best New Artist and Best Rap Performance for the single "Moment 4 Life". Over a decade since its release, the album has received praise from music journalists and has developed a cult following. In 2022, Rolling Stone included Pink Friday in their list of "200 Greatest Hip-Hop Albums of All Time" at number 31, stating that the album "proved you could own the charts without dialing back your confrontational individuality, and it set the table for a generation of artists." Minaj released a sequel to the album, Pink Friday 2, in 2023.

== Recording and production ==
After a major record label bidding war, Young Money Entertainment announced on August 31, 2009, that Nicki Minaj had signed to the label. Recording sessions for the album took place at several recording locations, including 25 Sound Studios in Detroit, Chalice Recording Studios in Los Angeles, and Glenwood Place Studios in Burbank, California. American record producer Swizz Beatz confirmed that his collaboration with Minaj for the album, with Minaj discussing a song, "Catch Me", describing it as "moody" and "mellow futuristic", would later became a bonus track on the album. Minaj also confirmed to Entertainment Weekly that the Black Eyed Peas member and record producer will.i.am contributed production to the album. Fellow rapper and record producer Kanye West was also confirmed for the album. Fellow record producer Bangladesh also contributed to the album. In 2011, there was a track, titled "We Miss You", from the album being leaked online. Minaj responded by saying that the song "was sent to Mariah Carey and Keyshia Cole over a year ago", but did not "make it on Pink Friday, due to clearance issues".

== Music and lyrics ==
"Super Bass"
A sample of "Super Bass", blending electronic music and pop over a hip-hop beat

"Your Love" is a mid-tempo hip-hop, pop, and R&B song, with an auto-tuned chorus. It samples the instrumentals and background vocals of Annie Lennox's cover version of "No More I Love You's" by The Lover Speaks, with the addition of additional bass, drum-loops and hip-hop backbeats. "Roman's Revenge" features American rapper Eminem; the song includes both rappers exchanging bars over a "spastic beat" produced by Swizz Beatz. Lyrically, "Roman's Revenge" has been described as "unrelenting", "bonkers", "angry" and "outrageous". "Did It On'em" is a hardcore hip-hop and post-dubstep song that has instrumentally been described as having a massive, ungainly beat. The lyrics speak of Minaj winning over her competition, by saying she "shitted on 'em" or "pissed on 'em."

"Right Thru Me" is styled with pop-rap tones, and has an electronic beat, while being influenced by R&B. Lyrically, the song describes someone who wonders aloud about how a lover can see the real her. Lyrically, "Moment 4 Life", is about a desire to maintain a feeling of accomplishment, as Drake follows behind Minaj and raps the same theme of enjoying the moment. Straying away from the standard rap song construction of three verses and a hook, Nicki performs a brain-dump of sorts on the track, spitting as if she's making a speech to both her fans and detractors. "Check It Out" features the nearly constant repetition of the piano and vocal hook from the Buggles' 1979 classic, "Video Killed the Radio Star", which is famous for being the first video ever played on MTV. "Super Bass" utilizes electronic music and bubblegum pop in its composition, while Minaj raps over a hip-hop beat, Minaj explained the song's concept, stating: "'Super Bass' is about the boy that you are crushing over, [...] And you kind of want to get your mack on, but you're taking the playful approach."

== Singles ==
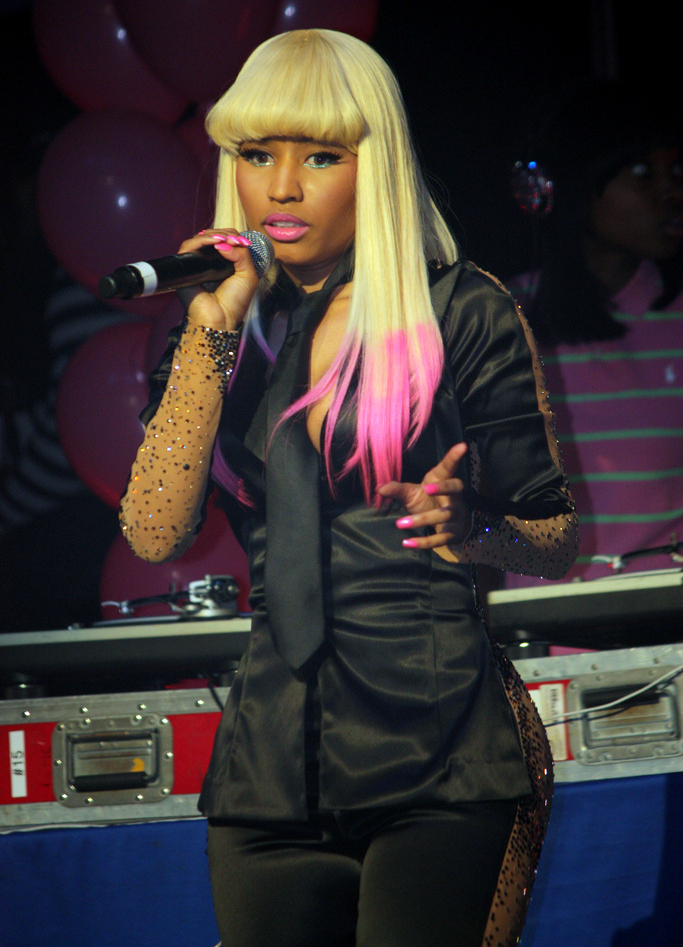
Minaj at the album's release concert in 2011

"Massive Attack" was released on April 13, 2010, through digital distribution. It bubbled under the US Billboard Hot 100 at number 22, and peaked at number 65 on the Hot R&B/Hip-Hop Songs chart. The song was initially considered to be the album's first single, however it was not on the album.

"Your Love" was released as the album's official lead single in the US on June 1, 2010, and as the first single in the United Kingdom on July 2, 2010. Initially, the song had never been planned for release, but after significant airplay it was mastered. It peaked at number 14 on the Billboard Hot 100, number four on the Hot R&B/Hip-Hop Songs chart and topped the Hot Rap Songs chart for eight consecutive weeks. Minaj became the first female artist to top the Hot Rap Songs chart unaccompanied since 2002. It also charted in Canada and the UK.

"Check It Out" was released on September 3, 2010. It was a joint single from the album between will.i.am and Minaj. A music video for the song was directed by Rich Lee and was released on October 25, 2010. The song has since peaked at number 24 on the Billboard Hot 100. "Right Thru Me" was released on September 24, 2010. A music video directed by Diane Martel was released for the single on October 27, 2010. The song peaked at number 26 on the Billboard Hot 100.

"Moment 4 Life", which features Drake, was released on December 7, 2010, as the album's fourth single. The music video for "Moment 4 Life" was released on January 27, 2011. The song peaked at number 13 on the Billboard Hot 100 and topped both the Hot R&B/Hip-Hop Songs and Rap Songs charts. "Roman's Revenge" featuring Eminem was released as a promotional single to iTunes on October 30, 2010.

"Super Bass" was released as the album's fifth single and officially impacted radio on April 5, 2011. It was released to iTunes in some markets on May 13, 2011. The song became an international top ten hit. In its seventh week on the Billboard Hot 100, the song had peaked at number 3, making it Minaj's first top ten placement as a lead artist. This single would go on to be Minaj's first diamond song by the RIAA (12× Platinum).

"Did It On'em" was sent to Urban radio on April 7, 2011, as the album's sixth single. The song peaked at number 49 on the Billboard Hot 100 and at numbers 3 and 4 on the Hot R&B/Hip-Hop Songs and Rap Songs charts respectively. "Girls Fall Like Dominoes" was released in Australia on April 11, 2011, and in the United Kingdom on April 15, 2011.

"Fly", which features Rihanna, was the album's eighth and final single. It was sent to US rhythmic radio and to Top 40/Mainstream radio on August 30, 2011. The song peaked at number 19 on the Billboard Hot 100 as well as in the top 20 in Australia and the United Kingdom.

== Release and promotion ==
On July 8, 2010, Minaj announced via Twitter that the album would be released on November 23, 2010. It was later announced that the album was pushed up by one day to November 22, 2010. Minaj's official website and related social networking outlets later announced that the digital download version of the album would be available for pre-order through iTunes on October 30, less than a month before the release date of the physical edition.

On her Twitter, Minaj stated that if she reached one million followers she would dedicate a Ustream to her fans. On August 3, 2010, Minaj went on Ustream to call fans who emailed her their phone numbers and to reveal the album's title. Later that same day, Minaj revealed on Ustream that the album's name would be Pink Friday, stating, "To carry on a great tradition of Black Friday, we are going to switch it up this year in honor of the Nicki Minaj album and call that day Pink Friday, and call my album Pink Friday!" A deluxe edition of the album was also confirmed. Minaj released the official artwork for her album cover on Friday, October 15, 2010. Rap-Up commented on the album cover, stating "The cover features Minaj as a doll alarmingly staring at the camera, sitting armless on the ground with her elongated legs in a flowing silver corset, pink stilettos, and a stark pink wig." GL Woods, the photographer of the cover, stated that Minaj wanted to look like a "broken Barbie". Woods photographed Minaj for an Out, which had a similar theme; according to the photographer, Minaj was inspired by the photoshoot.

Prior to the release of Pink Friday, MAC Cosmetics announced and launched a lipstick called "Pink 4 Friday" that was sold for four consecutive Fridays beginning November 26, 2010, in promotion of the album. In 2011, OPI Products created a six-piece nail polish collection with Minaj, in which the colors of the collection were named after select songs from the album. In December 2011, Mattel produced a custom-made, Minaj-themed Barbie doll valued at about $15,000 for auction. The doll's design was modeled after Minaj as how she appears on the Pink Friday album cover, with the pink wig and a similar outfit.

A 2020 reissue of the album, titled "Complete Edition", was released to coincide with its 10th anniversary on November 20, 2020, containing all the bonus tracks that were released from other versions of the album, such as "Bedrock", and the Lil Wayne remix of "Roman's Revenge".

== Tour ==
Pink Friday Promo Tour
- Continental tour by Nicki Minaj
- Location: North America • South America
- Associated album: Pink Friday
- Start date: October 22, 2010
- End date: October 30, 2010
- No. of shows: 5

Nicki Minaj concert chronology
- Pink Friday Promo Tour (2010); Pink Friday Tour (2012)

Minaj announced via the social networking site Twitter that she would kick off a five-date promotional tour a month before the album dropped. Tweeting, "Ok Barbz, here are the 1st 5 dates on my Pink Friday Tour," the tour began in Philadelphia on October 22, and ran through October 30 in Trinidad and Tobago.

Date	City	Country	Venue
North America
October 22, 2010	Philadelphia	United States	Wells Fargo Center
October 23, 2010	Washington, D.C.	United States	Star Night Club
October 24, 2010	Waterbury	United States	Sin City
October 25, 2010	Boston	United States	TD Garden
South America
October 30, 2010	Port of Spain	Trinidad and Tobago	Hasely Crawford Stadium

== Critical reception ==
Professional ratings
Aggregate scores
Source	Rating
AnyDecentMusic?	6.4/10
Metacritic	68/100
Review scores
Source	Rating
AllMusic	3.5/5 stars
Entertainment Weekly	B+
The Guardian	3/5 stars
The Independent	3/5 stars
MSN Music (Expert Witness)	A
NME	4/5 stars
Pitchfork	6.5/10
Rolling Stone	3.5/5 stars
Spin	7/10
USA Today	3/4 stars

Pink Friday was met with generally positive reviews from music critics. Review aggregator Metacritic, which uses a weighted average, assigned the album a score of 68 out of 100, based on 26 reviews, indicating "generally favorable reviews".

Reviewing the album for The Boston Globe, James Reed called it "a brash pop album brimming with Minaj's various personae and Technicolor rhymes". Entertainment Weekly's Brad Wete applauded Minaj's "knack for melody" and "boasting lyrics", while Sam Wolfson of NME noted Minaj's "pop sensibility", "volatility and quirks ... reminiscent of heyday Lil Wayne". Los Angeles Times writer Margaret Wappler commented that the album "shows Minaj is on the cusp", while Ann Powers noted Minaj's attempt to showcase her multi-faceted range and complimented her female perspective. Marc Hogan of Spin said it succeeded more as "a budding artist's love letter to pop – well-wrought and exuberantly penned", while Pitchfork critic Scott Plagenhoef believed "even when she's aiming down the middle of the road, she's at least better than almost anyone else", while citing the hip-hop bonus tracks "Blow Ya Mind" and "Muny" as among the album's best. He stated that the "pop album" is "a depressing Nicki Minaj album." AllMusic's David Jeffries wrote that the album "both dazzles and disappoints", stating "Feed off the production, the great musical ideas, and Minaj's keen sense of her surroundings, and Pink Friday is an outstanding success". Allison Stewart of The Washington Post wrote that the album "nibbles at the edges of what female rappers are allowed to do, even as it provides a steady helping of pop hits". Robert Christgau from MSN Music called Minaj "the quick-lipped hoyden of the year" who is "proud to be shameless, with the hooks to back it up", and later named Pink Friday the 12th best album of 2010.

Some reviewers were more critical. Andy Gill of The Independent felt that "Right Thru Me" is the only track that exhibits "adequate use of [Minaj's] R&B vocal skills" among an album of unoriginal "rap braggadocio". Slant Magazine's Jesse Cataldo praised Minaj's versatility on tracks like "Roman's Revenge", but was disappointed with the collaborative "Moment 4 Life", noting she could have shown more confidence by acting as a foil for Drake, but didn't. In The Observer, Kitty Empire called the album a "triumph of prevarication", but observed a stylistic identity crisis, with a satisfactory but characterless portion of pop music. Rich Juzwiak of The Village Voice criticized the album's "R&B crossover" material and found it lyrically "underwhelming". in a negative review, Alexis Petridis of The Guardian commented that "for every burst of originality, there's a burst of generic frosty synth and Auto-Tune", noting that "the pop- and R&B-influenced tracks simply aren't as exciting, lyrically or musically, as the foam-mouthed hardcore ones".

=== Accolades ===
Critics' year-end lists
Publication	List	Rank	Ref.
The Guardian	The 40 Best Albums of 2010	38	
Complex	The 25 Best Albums of 2010	25	

Industry awards
Year	Ceremony	Category	Result	Ref.
2011	American Music Awards	Favorite Rap/Hip-Hop Album	Won	
2011	BET Hip Hop Awards	CD of the Year	Nominated	
2011	Billboard Music Awards	Top Rap Album	Nominated	
2012	54th Annual Grammy Awards	Best Rap Album	Nominated	

== Commercial performance ==
Pink Friday debuted at number two on the US Billboard 200 chart, selling 375,000 copies in its first week. This marked the second-highest sales week for a female hip-hop artist, after Lauryn Hill's The Miseducation of Lauryn Hill (1998). On December 17, it was certified platinum by the Recording Industry Association of America (RIAA). In its eleventh week on the chart, the album sold 45,000 copies and topped the Billboard 200 for the first time. The album also held the then-record for the most weeks in the top ten on the Billboard 200 chart by a female rap album, having spent fourteen consecutive weeks in the top ten since its release. On March 22, 2016, the album was certified triple platinum by the RIAA for combined album sales, track sales, on-demand audio, and video streams equivalent of three million album-sale units. As of February 2018, the album has sold two million traditional copies in the United States.

Internationally, Pink Friday peaked at number eight in Canada, and within the top twenty in Australia, Ireland and the United Kingdom. In the United Kingdom, it has sold 282,000 copies, as of April 2012.

== Legacy ==
According to DeMicia Inman of Nylon, Pink Friday's commercial success "propelled [Minaj] into worldwide fame, which comes with more weight and responsibility than handing out mixtapes and street DVDs in club parking lots" and also "expanded the constraints that previously contained women to battle it out for a metaphorical throne". Dayna Haffenden of Complex wrote that "throughout the 13-song tracklist, she proved her pen game was not to be questioned, while showcasing her vulnerability and chameleonic abilities". Nick Soulsby of PopMatters wrote that "we're witnessing an avalanche of female rappers rising to the top" and that "we're living in a house that Minaj built and recognition that she is the finest rapper of the past decade... is overdue". Billboard credited Pink Friday with helping Minaj reintroduce female rap into the mainstream in the United States. Writing in 2021, Ellish Gilligan of Junkee wrote that "the influence of Pink Friday in pop, rap and even hyperpop in undeniable" and added that it is still inspiring albums like Doja Cat's Planet Her (2021). In 2020, Dayna Haffenden of Complex Magazine wrote, "[Nicki's] unwavering success has inspired a generation of rappers who have followed in her footsteps" and further went on to say that, "One decade later, Nicki Minaj's debut album can still be picked apart for gems, laughs, and a break from reality, which is ultimately a testament to its lasting legacy. Pink Friday proved that Minaj is here to stay, and she doesn't need anything but her art to speak for itself."

== Track listing ==
Pink Friday track listing^{[a]}
No.	Title	Writer(s)	Producer(s)	Length
1.	"I'm the Best"	Onika Maraj; Daniel Johnson	Kane Beatz	3:37
2.	"Roman's Revenge" (featuring Eminem)	Maraj; Marshall Mathers; Kasseem Dean	Swizz Beatz	4:38
3.	"Did It On'em"	Maraj; Shondrae Crawford; J. Ellington; S. Samuels	Bangladesh	3:32
4.	"Right Thru Me"	Maraj; Andrew Thielk; Stephen Hacker; J. Satriani	Drew Money	3:56
5.	"Fly" (featuring Rihanna)	Maraj; Jonathan Rotem; Kevin Hissink; William Jordan; C. Rishad	J.R. Rotem; Kevin Hissink	3:32
6.	"Save Me"	Maraj; Andrew Wansel; Warren Felder	Pop Wansel; Oak Felder	3:05
7.	"Moment 4 Life" (featuring Drake)	Maraj; Aubrey Graham; Tyler Williams; Nikhil Seetharam	T-Minus	4:39
8.	"Check It Out" (with will.i.am)	Maraj; William Adams; Geoffrey Downes; Trevor Horn; Bruce Woolley; J. Brown	will.i.am	4:11
9.	"Blazin'" (featuring Kanye West)	Maraj; Kanye West; Brown; Thielk; Keith Forsey; S. Schiff	Drew Money	5:02
10.	"Here I Am"	Maraj; Dean; J. Williams; Robbie Bronnimann	Swizz Beatz; John B	2:55
11.	"Dear Old Nicki"	Maraj; Johnson	Kane Beatz	3:53
12.	"Your Love"	Maraj; Wansel; David Freeman; Joseph Hughes; Felder	Pop Wansel; Oak Felder	4:05
13.	"Last Chance" (featuring Natasha Bedingfield)	Maraj; Natasha Bedingfield; Thielk	Drew Money	3:51
Total length:				50:46

Complete/super deluxe edition bonus tracks
No.	Title	Writer(s)	Producer(s)	Length
14.	"Super Bass"	Maraj; Johnson; Ester Dean	Kane Beatz	3:20
15.	"Blow Ya Mind"	Maraj; Samuels; Winston Thomas; Danny Schofield; Larry Nacht	Blackout	3:41
16.	"Muny"	Maraj; Wansel; Felder; Makeba Riddick	Pop Wansel; Oak Felder	3:47
17.	"Wave Ya Hand"	Maraj; Dean	Swizz Beatz	3:00
18.	"Catch Me"	Maraj; Dean	Swizz Beatz	3:56
19.	"Girls Fall Like Dominoes"	Maraj; Rotem; Robbie Furze; Millo Cordell; Cleveland Browne; Greville Gordon; Wylcliffe Johnson	J.R. Rotem	3:44
20.	"BedRock" (performed by Young Money featuring Lloyd)	Dwayne Carter, Jr.; Carl "Gudda Gudda" Lilly; Graham; Maraj; Michael Stevenson; Jarvis Mills; Lucas Bogg; Sean Garrett	Kane Beatz	4:48
21.	"Roman's Revenge" (featuring Lil Wayne)	Maraj; Carter, Jr.; Dean; Smith	Swizz Beatz	3:50
Total length:				88:26

Notes

- ^{^a} Credits adapted from the liner notes of Pink Friday.
- Track 14, 15 and 16 were initially available exclusively on the deluxe edition.
- Track 19 and 21 were initially available exclusively on the digital deluxe edition.
- The UK Super Bass edition includes the bonus tracks "Girls Fall Like Dominoes", and "Super Bass".
- The Overseas digital limited, US Best Buy, and international physical deluxe edition include the bonus tracks "Catch Me", and "Wave Ya Hand"
- The New Zealand deluxe edition includes the bonus tracks "Girls Fall Like Dominoes".
- The Japanese deluxe edition includes the bonus tracks "Girls Fall Like Dominoes", and "BedRock".

Sample credits

- "Check It Out" samples "Video Killed the Radio Star" performed by The Buggles, and elements and samples of "Think (About It)" written by James Brown, performed by Lyn Collins.
- "Blazin" samples "Don't You (Forget About Me)", written by Keith Forsey and Steve Schiff, as performed by Simple Minds.
- "Here I Am" samples "Red Sky" by John B and Shaz Sparks.
- "Your Love" samples "No More I Love You's" by Annie Lennox.
- "Girls Fall Like Dominoes" contains samples from "Dominos" written by The Big Pink, and interpolations of "Trailar Load a Girls" written by Cleveland Browne, Greville Gordon and Whycliffe Johnson.

== Personnel ==
Credits adapted from AllMusic.

- Chris Bellman – mastering
- Joshua Berkman – A&R
- Sandy Brummels – art direction
- Noel Cadastre – assistant
- Dwayne "Tha President" Carter – executive producer
- Lyttleton "Cartwheel" Carter – assistant
- Ariel Chobaz – engineer, mixing
- Seandrae "Mr. Bangladesh" Crawford – producer
- James Cruz – A&R, management
- Sean Combs – management
- DJ Ammo – synthesizer
- Dylan Dresdow – mixing
- Chris Gehringer – mastering
- Kevin Hissink – electric guitar
- John B. – keyboards, producer, programming
- Padraic Kerin – engineer
- Kidus Henok – A&R
- Kenny Meiselas – legal counsel
- Drew Money – producer
- Charles Moniz – engineer
- J.R. Rotem – arranger, mixing
- Safaree "SB" Samuels – A&R, vocals
- Ed Shapiro – legal counsel
- Noah "40" Shebib – engineer
- Olivia Smith – package design
- Shaz Sparks – vocals
- Swizz Beatz – producer
- T-Minus – producer
- Pop Wansel – producer
- will.i.am – drum programming, engineer, producer, synthesizer
- Bryan Williams – executive producer
- Ronald Williams – executive producer
- G.L. Wood – photography

== Charts ==
=== Weekly charts ===
Chart (2010–2012)	Peak position
Australian Albums (ARIA)	19
Australian Urban Albums (ARIA)	5
Belgian Albums (Ultratop Flanders)	81
Belgian Albums (Ultratop Wallonia)	100
Canadian Albums (Billboard)	8
French Albums (SNEP)	116
Irish Albums (IRMA)	17
South Korean Albums (Gaon)	110
New Zealand Albums (RMNZ)	15
Scottish Albums (Official Charts)	22
Spanish Albums (Promusicae)	94
UK Albums (Official Charts)	16
UK R&B Albums (Official Charts)	4
US Billboard 200	1
US Top R&B/Hip-Hop Albums (Billboard)	1

=== Year-end charts ===
Chart (2011)	Position
Australian Albums (ARIA)	82
Canadian Albums (Billboard)	28
UK Albums (OCC)	61
US Billboard 200	7
US Top R&B/Hip-Hop Albums (Billboard)	2
Chart (2012)	Position
UK Albums (OCC)	94
US Billboard 200	152
US Top R&B/Hip-Hop Albums (Billboard)	32

=== Decade-end charts ===
Chart (2010–2019)	Position
US Billboard 200	86

== Certifications ==
Certifications and sales for Pink Friday
Region	Certification	Certified units/sales
Australia (ARIA)	Platinum	70,000^{^}
New Zealand (RMNZ)	2× Platinum	30,000^{‡}
United Kingdom (BPI)	Platinum	300,000^{^}
United States (RIAA)	3× Platinum	3,000,000^{‡}
^{^} Shipments figures based on certification alone.^{‡} Sales+streaming figures based on certification alone.

== See also ==
- List of Billboard 200 number-one albums of 2011
- Pink Friday 2
