= Money Maker (Reloaded) =

Studio album by Froggy Fresh
- Released: December 21, 2012
- Recorded: April–December, 2012
- Genre: Hip hop, Comedy
- Length: 48:17

Froggy Fresh chronology
Money Maker (Reloaded) (2012)	Dream Team (2014)

Money Maker (Reloaded), alternatively spelled Money Maker (Re-Loaded), is the debut album by American rapper Froggy Fresh, originally released on December 21, 2012. The album was originally titled Money Maker. The album was named for Money Maker Mike. On April 23, 2014, a remastered version of the album was released.

== Background ==
Froggy Fresh created songs under the name "Krispy Kreme". Starting with "The Baddest", these songs, accompanied by music videos, went viral. However, in December 2012, the rapper was forced to change his name by the Krispy Kreme doughnut company. While the rapper was intending to change his name to Jelly Bean Jack, the rapper opted to instead change his name to Froggy Fresh. The original title of the album was going to be Money Maker. However, due to the rapper being forced to change his name and the words "Krispy Kreme" being mentioned on the album's tracks, the album was discarded. Then the album was instead released as an extended version of the discarded album including an additional four tracks originally being held off for Froggy's following album. The music videos were treated similarly, as they were deleted and later re-uploaded in February 2013 with any mention of "Krispy Kreme" being dubbed over with "Froggy Fresh" or muted.

== Track listing ==
All tracks are written by Froggy Fresh.

Money Maker (Reloaded) track listing
No.	Title	Length
1.	"The Baddest"	3:46
2.	"Haters Wanna Be Me"	2:30
3.	"Best Friends"	3:26
4.	"Girl Work It"	4:35
5.	"Stolen Bikes"	3:28
6.	"Coolest Guys"	3:02
7.	"The Fight"	2:25
8.	"Denzel Washington"	3:25
9.	"Me and Daniel Tosh"	2:01
10.	"Halloween"	3:37
11.	"Christmas"	2:44
12.	"Same Old Kid"	4:19
13.	"Mikes Mom"	3:35
14.	"Er"	3:03
15.	"Er" (live; remix)	2:53
Total length:		48:17

== Charts ==
Chart performance for Money Maker (Reloaded)
Chart (2013)	Peak position
US Comedy Albums (Billboard)	3
