= Shake Your Moneymaker =

Shake Your Moneymaker may refer to:

- "Shake Your Moneymaker" (song), by Elmore James, recorded by several artists
- Shake Your Money Maker (album), a 1990 album by The Black Crowes
- Shake Your Money Maker, a 1996 album by Gillette

== See also ==
- "Shake Your Money", song by Black Grape from their 1995 album It's Great When You're Straight...Yeah
- "Money Maker", a 2006 single from rapper Ludacris, which features the saying as a refrain
