= Check It Out (will.i.am and Nicki Minaj song) =

2010 single by will.i.am and Nicki Minaj

Single by will.i.am and Nicki Minaj

from the album Pink Friday
- Released: September 3, 2010
- Recorded: 2010
- Studio: Glenwood Place Studios (Burbank, CA)
- Genre: Pop rap; electropop
- Length: 4:11; 3:58 (Radio Edit)
- Label: Interscope
- Songwriters: Onika Maraj; William Adams; Geoff Downes; Trevor Horn; Bruce Woolley
- Producer: will.i.am

will.i.am singles chronology
"I'm in the House" (2010)	"Check It Out" (2010)	"Free" (2011)

Nicki Minaj singles chronology
"Letting Go (Dutty Love)" (2010)	"Check It Out" (2010)	"Right Thru Me" (2010)

Music video
- "Check It Out" on YouTube

"Check It Out" is a song performed by American rappers will.i.am and Nicki Minaj. The hip hop and electropop song, written by will.i.am and Minaj, samples the 1979 hit single "Video Killed the Radio Star" by the Buggles. After release, it debuted on the US Billboard Hot 100 at No. 78 and on the Canadian Hot 100 at No. 48. It appears on Minaj's first album, Pink Friday, though it was not released to promote the album. The special remix released in the UK features the British recording artist Cheryl Cole. The song peaked at No. 24 on the Billboard Hot 100. By December 2013, it had sold 780,000 digital downloads.

== Background ==
The song samples "Video Killed the Radio Star" by the Buggles. Minaj said in an interview with Entertainment Weekly that she was working with producer will.i.am on her latest album, not hinting at whether it was a production or a featured help, saying, "Just something for my album that I'm really excited about." An unofficial mix of the song was leaked on the Internet on August 27, 2010, two weeks before its official release.

In an interview with MTV News, Minaj commented on her collaboration with the will.i.am, saying, "I worked with tons of producers on my album, shout out to all of them. Will’s the only producer that produced me. He really sat there and got this weird sound, and I was like, 'What?' It was so simple. He was sitting there and he made the beat on the spot." She continued, "I was sitting there, and it was like five minutes later, he finished the beat!" The Buggles, the British band behind the original, performed the updated record "Check It Out" at shows at Supperclub in London and at The British Music Experience at The O2 Arena. The lead singer, Trevor Horn, commented on his song being sampled by the duo by saying, "We’re very happy because it means we made a little bit of money for it."

== Composition and critical reception ==
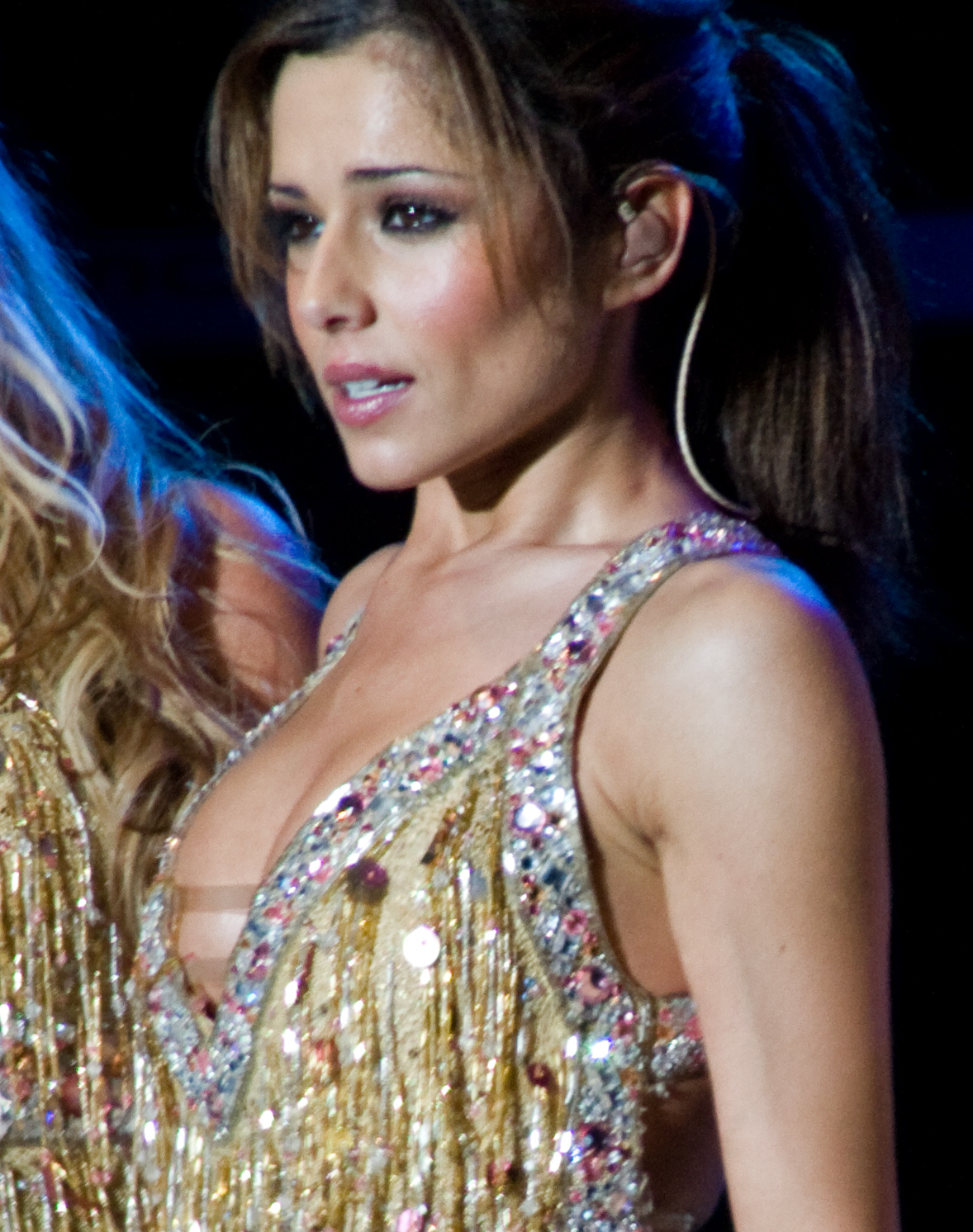
Cheryl was featured on the song's Special mix.

"Check It Out"
A sample of "Check It Out", where will.i.am raps his first verse.

"Check It Out" features the nearly constant repetition of the piano and vocal hook from The Buggles' 1979 classic 'Video Killed the Radio Star,' which is famous for being the first video ever played on MTV in 1981. Matthew Wilkening of AOL Radio Blog states that the "Incessant 'Oh-a oh's' pretty much bore a hole in your head, the duo verbally flip the bird to their haters while on their way into the hottest dance club in town." Wilkening gave the song's lyrics a negative review stating "If you're looking for deep lyrical insights, jeez, are you at the wrong party." Entertainment Weekly put the single as its No. 2 of "The Must List" writing, "The Black Eyed Peas front-man and hip-hop's reigning femme fatale make ingenious use of those famous coos from the 1979 Buggles hit "Video Killed the Radio Star" to create an irresistible party-starter."

The special remix also features the British singer Cheryl Cole, but both versions of the song were released in the UK for digital download on October 31, 2010, and CD on November 1, 2010. The music video for the UK special mix was released on November 11, 2010. It is mostly the same as the original with added clips that include Cole.

== Music video ==
The music video for the single was shot over the weekend of September 26 in a studio in Los Angeles, directed by Rich Lee. In an interview with MTV News, Will.i.am said, "You can expect to see a bunch of flyness as far as the outfits. When I say flyness, I'm talking about Nicki's outfits. She's looking super-duper fly and whatnot." The video is a tribute to Japanese anime. Minaj also commented on the video shoot and its theme, saying, "We're doing almost like an ode to Japanese culture and Japanese anime. I'm obviously a big fan and I've joined forces with like the only boy that I know that's also able to capture that culture." A behind the scenes video was released along with the interview. This is, however, in contrast to both the spoken introduction to the video and the words popping up during the video; the words are written in hangul, the Korean alphabet, and the introduction is spoken in Korean.

The music video was released on October 25, 2010.

=== Synopsis ===
Minaj and will.i.am dress in futuristic Korean culture attire in the video.

Because the video uses the Korean language rather than Japanese, her "tribute to Japanese anime" and her claim to be an "obvious big fan" is made questionable. Korean was possibly used because it takes fewer characters to write and would take less space on the screen. The video starts on a simple soundstage. A man (who is Korean) introduces the pair to an audience of women similarly dressed in black and wearing squared sunglasses. As the song begins playing from a boombox, Minaj – wearing a creatively shaped teal, cream and mauve hat, blonde wig and beige outfit – raps to the camera that she is a "savage/ Haters you can kill yourself". When the chorus arrives, so do the clones of will.i.am dressed in white jackets. Cape is wearing striped shirts and black pants. Then two dancers, clad in futuristic clothing and goggles, begin grooving and suddenly multiply into five more clones all executing the same moves. The scene flips back to Minaj's camera, and there is now only one will.i.am and two Nicksters. When the beat slows down for the song's bridge, Minaj is in a new outfit, a pink and white bodysuit with a black wig. Then will.i.am, who received flak for performing during the MTV Video Music Awards (VMA) in what many described as black face, appears in what one could call "white face". He resembles a black-and-white cartoon, whose face is white but hair is black, as he rhymes, "Step up to my level need to grow a little taller." The video ends with Minaj and Will striking poses.

== Live performances ==
Minaj and will.i.am appeared together at the 2010 VMAs pre-show, where they performed "Check It Out" as well as Minaj appearing solo to perform her single "Your Love". Rap-Up magazine said the performance had eccentric dancing and pink escapades. However, Chris Ryan from MTV Buzzworthy was less impressed with the duo appearing as The Jetsons. He said, "The WTF? ... Look, we LOVE Nicki Minaj. We would fake-marry her if Drake hadn't already fake-married her. And one thing we really, really love about Nicki Minaj is the wild and crazy looks she breaks out. But given the flack he's taken in the last few days over his, um, unique choice in attire, she might have wanted to pregame with Will.i.am a little harder, regarding his stage fashion." He went on to say that Minaj's performance lived up to expectations. "And of course, Nicki more than delivered. Harajuku Barbie really brought the house down with "Check It Out", You have to see it to believe it."

However, will.i.am attracted negative media criticism for his choice of outfit, consisting of "an all black leather outfit with matching all black make-up". Sean Michaels of The Guardian wrote, "It was a look more Max Headroom than Al Jolson, but never underestimate the Internet's capacity for righteous indignation," while fans "comparing his makeup to the racist 19th century blackface minstrel shows". "1st. just because I where [sic] all black including head mask as expression and emphasize my outfit, it shouldn’t be looked at as racial…, let go of the past. there are far more important things 2 bark about. (Jobs, health, education) not a black man wearing all black everything. Are you guys serious? my outfit set “black people back 100 yrs" choose your twits wisely. no education sets people back, no jobs, bad health." Minaj agreed with will.i.am's decision and attire in an interview with Hot 97’s Funkmaster Flex, saying, "You can't expect him to make common folk happy."

The duo also appeared on the Late Show with David Letterman on October 4, 2010. The performance recalled some of the elements of their VMA performance, including the two female back-up dancers and Minaj's hype man S.B. wearing a Pink Friday T-shirt. Both later performed the single on the Live with Regis & Kelly show on October 11, 2010. Minaj performed in a blonde wig, kaleidoscopic Marc Bouwer couture dress, and Christian Louboutin ankle boots.

== Personnel ==
- Chris Bellman – mastering
- Dylan "3D" Dresdow – mixing
- will.i.am – production, recording, synthesizers, vocals, writing
- Padriac Kerin – recording
- DJ Ammo – synthesizers
- Ariel Chobaz – recording
- Nicki Minaj – rap vocals, writing
- Bruce Woolley – writing
- Geoff Downes – writing
- Trevor Horn – writing
- Cheryl Cole – vocals (special mix and backing vocals on original mix)

== Track listing ==
- Canada, US digital download
1. "Check It Out" – 4:11
- International digital download
1. "Check It Out" (Radio Mix) – 3:58
- UK digital and CD single
1. "Check It Out" (Main) – 4:11
2. "Check It Out" (Special Mix) (with Cheryl Cole) – 4:11
- Canada, US digital The Remixes single
1. "Check It Out" (Benny Benassi Remix) – 5:55
2. "Check It Out" (Shameboy Remix) – 5:11

== Charts and certifications ==
=== Weekly charts ===
Chart (2010–11)	Peak position
Australia (ARIA)	21
Belgium (Ultratip Bubbling Under Flanders)	4
Belgium (Ultratip Bubbling Under Wallonia)	2
Canada Hot 100 (Billboard)	14
Canada CHR/Top 40 (Billboard)	17
Czech Republic Airplay (ČNS IFPI)	52
Denmark (IFPI Dance)	40
European Hot 100 Singles (Billboard)	36
Ireland (IRMA)	14
Japan (Japan Hot 100)	5
Japan Hot Overseas (Billboard)	1
Netherlands (Dutch Top 40)	27
Scottish Singles Sales (Official Charts)	12
Slovakia Airplay (ČNS IFPI)	26
UK Singles (Official Charts)	11
US Billboard Hot 100	24
US Dance Club Songs (Billboard)	48
US Hot R&B/Hip-Hop Songs (Billboard)	100
US Pop Airplay (Billboard)	21

=== Year-end charts ===
Chart (2010)	Position
UK Singles (Official Charts Company)	132
Chart (2011)	Position
Japan (Japan Hot 100)	70

=== Certifications ===
Region	Certification	Certified units/sales
United Kingdom (BPI)	Silver	200,000^{^}
^{^} Shipments figures based on certification alone.

== Release history ==
Country	Date	Type
Canada	September 3, 2010	Digital download
Canada	September 8, 2010	Digital download, Main radio mix
Canada	November 22, 2010	Digital download, The Remixes
United States	September 3, 2010	Digital download
United States	September 8, 2010	Digital download, Main radio mix
United States	September 14, 2010	Mainstream airplay
United States	October 19, 2010	Urban airplay
United States	November 22, 2010	Digital download, The Remixes
Australia	September 10, 2010	Digital download, Radio mix
Germany	September 10, 2010	Digital download, Radio mix
United Kingdom	October 31, 2010	Digital download
United Kingdom	November 1, 2010	CD single
