= The Baddest (Froggy Fresh song) =

Single by Froggy Fresh

from the album Money Maker (Re-Loaded)
- Released: April 20, 2012
- Recorded: April 2012
- Genre: Hip hop
- Length: 3:47
- Songwriter: Froggy Fresh

Froggy Fresh singles chronology
"The Baddest" (2012)	"Haters Wanna Be Me" (2012)

"The Baddest" is a song by the American hip-hop artist Tyler Cassidy, released as his Froggy Fresh character under the character's original "Krispy Kreme" moniker. Released on April 20, 2012, the song was self-written and accompanied by a music video, just as all subsequent songs by Froggy Fresh. Cassidy's debut song as the character, it is included as the first track on the album Money Maker (Re-Loaded).

== Release and music video ==
Froggy Fresh, then under the moniker, Krispy Kreme, recorded and released the song in April 2012.

The music video for "The Baddest" was released on April 20, 2012, as Froggy's debut music video and song. The music video went viral, reaching 11 million views, before being removed from YouTube. The original music video, which included the name "Krispy Kreme" in the lyrics, was removed due to a dispute with the Krispy Kreme doughnut company. However, an edited version of the music video was released by Froggy on February 15, 2013.

== Reception ==
The viral videos have been highlighted for their slow-witted and braggadocio lyrics, along with being featured on CBS.

Aside from praise of his viral videos, the rapper has also met negativity for "The Baddest" video as Tosh.0 criticized his flow and the beat of the song. The song caused Froggy to also be referred to as "the Rebecca Black of rapping".
