= Froggy Fresh =

American musician (born 1990)

- Also known as: Krispy Kreme
- Born: Tyler Stephen Cassidy; January 1990 (age 36)
- Origin: Burton, Michigan, U.S.
- Genres: Tyler Cassidy; Soul; pop Krispy Kreme / Froggy Fresh; Comedy hip hop
- Occupations: Singer, rapper, songwriter

YouTube information
- Channels: FroggyFreshRap; Tyler Cassidy Music
- Years active: 2012–present
- Genres: Music; comedy; satire
- Subscribers: 860K (FFR) 450K (TCM)
- Views: 199.9 million (FFR) 50.8 million (TCM)
- Last updated: February 25, 2026

Tyler Stephen Cassidy (born January 1990), also known as Froggy Fresh (and previously Krispy Kreme), is an American singer and rapper. He became known after the comedy rap music video for his song, "The Baddest", became popular on YouTube. He continued rapping until 2018, when Cassidy stepped away from his Froggy Fresh character and began a career as a singer under his real name. As of February 2026, Cassidy's FroggyFreshRap YouTube channel has over 860 thousand subscribers and 200 million video views, while his Tyler Cassidy Music channel has over 450 thousand subscribers and 50 million video views.

== Career ==
=== 2012: Initial virality as Krispy Kreme ===
Michigan-based Tyler Cassidy began rapping at 19. At 22, Cassidy began uploading videos as the character "Krispy Kreme". The first Krispy Kreme video uploaded was the music video for "The Baddest". Uploaded on April 20, 2012, it attracted attention from websites such as The Huffington Post. Writing for The Stranger, Megan Seling noted that Krispy's deadpan delivery featured in "The Baddest" made many unsure if the video was authentic or satirical in nature.

On May 14, Krispy Kreme released his follow-up single, "Haters Wanna Be Me", which also quickly became popular. "Haters Wanna Be Me" was ranked as the No. 20 best music video of 2012, so far, by Complex. Krispy's first two videos were noted by media outlets for their slow-witted and braggadocio lyrics. One oft-cited lyric featured Krispy boasting about supposedly having "400 cars, scars, guitars, houses (twice), and mouses."

On May 31, Krispy released another song, "Best Friends", a more serious rap than the previous two, with the lyrics focusing on his friendship with Money Maker Mike and referencing the influential rapper Tupac Shakur towards the end of the song. On June 3, 2012, Kreme gave a motivational speech to his fans about chasing their dreams. Krispy Kreme uploaded another song on July 6, 2012, titled "Stolen Bikes". His seventh song, titled "The Fight", was uploaded on August 24, 2012. Afterwards, on September 14, he released a song called "Denzel Washington", praising the actor. Around this time, the rapper was also featured on the Comedy Central show Tosh.0.

In November 2012, Krispy Kreme was featured in a Mashable article that listed fifteen people made famous by the internet.

=== 2012–2013: Froggy Fresh and Money Maker (Reloaded) ===
On December 3, 2012, Cassidy, while in character, stated on his YouTube channel that his father received a call from the Krispy Kreme doughnut company telling him that his name was trademark infringement. He also stated that he could not use any variation of the words 'Krispy' or 'Kreme' without facing legal problems. Krispy Kreme announced that he would be changing his rap name to one of the following, depending on viewer comments: Froggy Fresh, Candy Cane, Jelly Bean, Jelly Bean Jack, Lil Kuntry, or White Chocolate. Though he was originally going to change his stage name to Jelly Bean Jack, on December 18, the rapper announced he would go by Froggy Fresh.

Also in December 2012, Froggy Fresh released his debut album, Money Maker (Reloaded) on the iTunes Store. The album featured new songs in addition to existing ones already on his YouTube channel. On January 9, 2013, the music video for "Same Old Kid", the rapper's first song under the name Froggy Fresh, was released. On January 26, 2013, Money Maker (Re-Loaded), debuted and peaked at No. 3 on the Billboard Comedy Album chart.

Froggy Fresh deleted all his music videos that featured the moniker "Krispy Kreme", before re-posting the videos on February 15, switching "Krispy Kreme" to "Froggy Fresh". In February 2013, Froggy released an announcement video that also included a freestyle. The music video for "Mike's Mom" was released on March 4, 2013. In March 2013, John Cena spoke about Froggy Fresh, during an interview, praising the rapper.

=== 2013–2018: Dream Team and Escape from Hood Mountain ===
On May 21, 2013, Froggy Fresh released the single, "Dunked On", which Froggy previously revealed would appear on his second album. The album, confirmed to be titled Dream Team, was released in October 2014, on iTunes.

Froggy released a non-album single, as well as its music video, titled "Jimmy Butler Is Your Father". The song's lyrics center on praising Chicago Bulls basketball player Jimmy Butler, as well as the entire Bulls franchise, and dissed the Cleveland Cavaliers and their star small forward, LeBron James. Froggy would release the track and music video on May 9, 2015, one day after the Chicago Bulls defeated the Cleveland Cavaliers in the third game of their Eastern Conference Semi-finals series. However, the Bulls would lose their following game and end up losing their best of seven series against the Cavaliers.

On February 21, 2017, Cassidy uploaded a video on YouTube, which has since been removed from his channel, explaining the story behind the Krispy Kreme/Froggy Fresh project. In the 23-minute video, Cassidy revealed that Froggy Fresh was indeed a comedic character created after years of struggling to gain attention as a serious rap artist. Despite stating that he truly enjoyed the five years of making videos, Cassidy revealed that it eventually became boring for him and that the friends who populated his videos had gone in different directions in their respective lives. He also expressed his interest in becoming a comedic actor.

=== 2018–2023: Releasing music as Tyler Cassidy ===
After releasing Escape from Hood Mountain and going on a tour, Cassidy dropped the Froggy Fresh character and persona; he additionally stopped posting to the Froggy Fresh YouTube account. Cassidy began uploading his new music onto an eponymous YouTube account that was registered in January 2018. He uploaded both original and cover songs on the channel. Shortly thereafter, Cassidy once again went viral online, as his original "Junkie" song attracted attention on the "r/videos" subreddit forum.

In June 2019, Creative Loafing wrote, "with soft piano melodies and honestly pretty offensive lyrics, Cassidy's internet presence today walks a drunk line between music, comedy and cringe." In October, Cassidy released a non-album track titled "Amber Guyger", named after and criticizing the police officer found guilty of murdering Botham Jean.

On October 30, 2019, Cassidy released Renee, his debut album under his real name.

=== 2023–2024: Retirement from music and Cameo account ===
On November 20, 2023, Cassidy made an announcement on his Instagram and Facebook stating that he was retiring from his music career, and started selling items used in previous music videos. On December 4, Cassidy opened up a Cameo account where he, as his Froggy Fresh character, would make short songs based on stories that fans would submit in for a request. In September 2024, Cassidy released "Still The Baddest", a remake of "The Baddest".

== Other ventures ==
He was scheduled to fight Chris Ray Gun at the then-upcoming Creator Clash 2 on April 15, 2023. However, he was removed from the fight card shortly prior to the event, causing some of his fans to boycott the event.

== Discography ==
=== Albums ===
List of albums, with selected chart positions
Title	Album details	Peak chart positions
Title	Album details	US Comedy
Money Maker (Reloaded)	Released: December 21, 2012; Formats: CD, digital download	3
Dream Team	Released: October 3, 2014; Formats: CD, digital download	—
Escape from Hood Mountain	Released: February 15, 2018; Formats: Digital download	—
