= Best Friends (Sophia Grace song) =

2014 single by Sophia Grace

Single by Sophia Grace

from the EP Hollywood
- Released: November 30, 2014
- Recorded: 2014
- Genre: Bubblegum pop; pop rap
- Length: 3:53
- Label: Capitol Records France
- Songwriters: Dominic Brownlee; Hi W. Jackson
- Producers: Donald Sales; Da Beatfreakz

Sophia Grace singles chronology
"Girls Just Gotta Have Fun" (2013)	"Best Friends" (2014)	"Girl in the Mirror" (2016)

Music video
- "Best Friends" on YouTube

"Best Friends" is a song by singer Sophia Grace of the British duo Sophia Grace & Rosie. It was released to all streaming platforms on November 30, 2014. It was written by Dominic Brownlee and Hi W. Jackson, and produced by Donald Sales and Da Beatfreakz. The music video was released on January 7, 2015. The song debuted at number 87 on the Billboard Hot 100.

== Background and composition ==
In November 2014, Grace announced the track was available to download on iTunes. It was eventually released on November 30 to all social media platforms. The song is a bubblegum pop and pop rap single that is marketed towards children. It contains heavy production grounded by elements of synth, bass, snaps, and hi-hats, among other sounds. Sophia sings about being committed to friendship and leadership, having a "best friend that has your back", disbanding and "shutting down stupid boys", singing in the first verse, rapping in the second verse, and doing both in the third verse. Ryan Bassil described the song as "an incredible exercise in crafting a brilliant pop song. The DJ Mustard-esque production is on point, there's a mid-song breakdown that's reminiscent of PC Music, and it works in almost any situation."

Grace spoke with Ryan Seacrest about the track.

I'm so excited to release this song as I think all girls can relate to the lyrics ... It's a great song to listen to with your friends at a party and it's real catchy for everyone to sing along, I had so much fun recording this song in the studio.

== Reception ==
In his review for PopBuzz, Liam Dryden stated: "There's no denying the song's a banger, but it feels like a whole other thing when you realize the singer is 11 years old and looks as though she's been lifted straight out of an ad for Lelli Kelly shoes". Singer-songwriter Katy Perry expressed her approval of the record on Twitter. On January 7, she wrote "If Sophia Grace plays her new trap hit at Coachella, I'll go." and in a now-deleted tweet, "[This song] goes hard as fuck."

In the United States, "Best Friends" debuted at number 87 on the Billboard Hot 100 on week ending January 24, 2015, becoming Grace's first ever entry on the chart.

== Music video ==
On November 14, 2014, a trailer for the song's music video was posted, along with a behind the scenes video on December 16. The full video was eventually released on January 7, 2015. It showcases Grace and other actors portraying her "best friends" in different scenes. One dancing in a bedroom, hopping on a bed, another one shopping together at a Kmart for outfits and toys before returning home to try their outfits and makeup on, and the last one dancing on a stage. Short clips of Sophia dancing and singing in front of a sunset are also included. The video was directed by Matt Alonzo. It currently sits at over 94 million views.

== Charts ==
Chart performance for "Best Friends"
Chart (2015)	Peak position
US Billboard Hot 100	87
