= Amelia Moneymaker =

American artistic gymnast

Amelia Moneymaker (born September 22, 2004) is an American artistic gymnast on the UC Davis Aggies' women's gymnastics team and competes in the Mountain Pacific Sports Federation (MPSF). Moneymaker has earned recognition from both UC Davis and MPSF.

== Early life ==
Amelia Moneymaker was born in September 22, 2004, in Sacramento, California. She started on the competitive gymnastics team at Technique Gymnastics in 2012 in Rancho Cordova, CA. By the age of 11, Moneymaker was training under Annie Baker at Dream Xtreme Gymnastics in Vacaville, CA. At Dream Xtreme, she won the regional floor championship in 2021.

== NCAA gymnastics career ==
- School Record Holder in All Around and Uneven Bars
- 2023 All-MPSF Second Team (Vault/Bars)
- 2023 All-MPSF First Team (Floor)
- 2023 MPSF Freshman of the Year
- 2024 MPSF Champion (Beam)
- 2024 All-MPSF Second Team (Bars)
- 2024 All-MPSF First Team (Floor)
- 2025 MPSF Champion (Bars/Beam/All-Around)
- 2025 All-MPSF First Team (Bars/Beam/Floor/All-Around)
- 2025 NCAA Qualifier (All-Around)

The school record holder joined the UC Davis Aggies gymnastics team in 2022. During the 2022-2023 season, she competed in all 11 meets on the vault and floor exercise in her debut season. She competed uneven bars for 8 meets, joining the lineup against San Jose State in February 2023. Despite a serious case of cellulitus on her right wrist during the meet against Air Force (2/16/2024) Moneymaker received Freshman of the Week honors three times and earned Freshman of the Year from the MPSF conference. Additionally, Moneymaker earned All-MPSF First Team honors for floor exercise and Second Team honors for vault and bars. Moneymaker contributed to the fifth conference title for the Aggies.

The next season, Moneymaker competed in all 11 regular season meets as well as the MPSF conference championship in the All Around competition. Throughout the season she was nursing a torn TFCC, a partially torn extensor carpi ulnaris tendon, and dorsal radial ligament. Moneymaker opted to not have surgery on her wrist. She tied the school record on the uneven bars with a score of 9.925. She also tied for second top All Around score in school history with a 39.450. Moneymaker ended the season as the MPSF Balance Beam Champion and tied for second in the All Around at the MPSF conference championships. She earned MPSF All Academic honors, All-MPSF First Team honors for All Around and Floor Exercise, and All-MPSF Second Team honors for Uneven Bars.

During the 2024-2025 season, Moneymaker competed All Around in all 12 regular season meets and the MPSF conference championships. She competed as an individual All Around competitor at the NCAA Regional Championships in Seattle, WA. The UC Davis team also qualified to the team competition at Regionals, so Moneymaker competed with the team, too. In addition to the tears in her right wrist from the previous season, at the quad meet at Washington on January 10, 2025, Moneymaker suffered a stress fracture of her right tibula. Later in the season, at the meet at San Jose State, she tore the fascia away from her left heel bone. On March 14, 2025, Moneymaker bested her own All Around record and earned the highest All Around score in UC Davis history with a 39.550. On March 22, 2025, Moneymaker landed on the All Around leaderboard once again by earning a 39.50, putting her in first, third, and tied-fourth in the UC Davis top five scores. She also earned the All-Time All Arounder with seven scores of 39 or above. She earned All MPSF First Team honors on uneven bars, balance beam, floor exercise, and all around. She took home the title for uneven bars, balance beam, and all around. Moneymaker earned three Gymnast of the Week honors.

Moneymaker will compete in her final season during 2025-2026 after having spent most of the summer treating the injuries on her shin and heel.

== Personal life ==
Amelia Moneymaker is a graduate of Del Oro High School in Loomis, CA. She is a cousin to former UCLA gymnast Heidi Moneymaker and former San Jose State gymnast Renae Moneymaker.
