= Right Thru Me =

Single by Nicki Minaj

from the album Pink Friday
- Released: September 24, 2010
- Recorded: 2009–2010
- Studio: Glenwood Place Studios (Burbank, CA)
- Genre: Hip-hop; synthwave; R&B
- Length: 3:55
- Label: Young Money; Cash Money; Universal Motown
- Songwriters: Onika Maraj; Andrew Thielk; Joe Satriani; Stephen Hacker
- Producer: Drew Money

Nicki Minaj singles chronology
"Check It Out" (2010)	"Right Thru Me" (2010)	"Monster" (2010)

Music video
- "Right Thru Me" on YouTube

"Right Thru Me" is a song by rapper Nicki Minaj from her debut studio album, Pink Friday (2010). It was released as the album's second single on September 24, 2010 by Young Money, Cash Money, and Universal Motown. It was serviced to urban and rhythmic radio on October 5, and then mainstream radio on November 2, 2010. The song charted on the US Billboard Hot 100, Australia, France and the United Kingdom.

"Right Thru Me" is a hip-hop , synthwave and R&B song featuring electronic beats and synths. Lyrically, Minaj wonders how a lover can see through her. The Diane Martel-directed music video was filmed the weekend of October 1, 2010, and premiered on October 27.

== Background ==
While discussing the progress of her debut album with MTV, Minaj discussed a song she described as a "standout" in the entire album. The song "Right Thru Me" is confirmed for the album with Minaj stating, "It's not gonna come right now. It'll come closer to when the album drops, but it's a really, really pretty song. Everyone's gonna like it. It's just really insightful but in a very conversational kind of way." The song was produced and co-written by Andrew "Drew Money" Thielk.

In an interview with ET, Minaj commented on the depth and the meaning of the song stating "The song to me is very, very personal. I haven't spoken about an authentic relationship since I've come out. … Not everybody is rich, not everyone likes jewelry, not everybody likes playing dress-up, but everyone has been in a relationship at some point in their lives, so when you hear a relationship song, it's like, you react.""

== Composition ==
"Right Thru Me" is a pop rap song that features an electronic beat, while being influenced by R&B. The main accompanying melody and chord progression are sampled from the Joe Satriani song "Always with Me, Always with You" from his breakthrough 1987 album Surfing With the Alien. The song has been described as a breezy jam that brandishes a swinging electronic beat, synth melodies, big pop hooks and guitar lines, and triple metre beats. Lyrically, the song describes someone who wonders aloud about how a lover can see the real her.

MTV described the song as "straight-shooting rap" in Minaj's "multiple-accent style" while also being in the vein of "a Katy Perry-esque ballad", with Minaj singing about a lover who stands by her through thick and thin. Paul Cantor of MTV News said it "finds Nicki talking to a lover, admitting that she puts up walls and tries to hide behind a front, but despite all that, her feelings are really transparent. ... The track is all triple-time drum programming and sprightly synthesizer lead lines. It's a perfect backdrop for her to spit. The hook finds Nicki questioning, almost rhetorically."

== Critical reception ==
Chris Ryan of MTV Buzzworthy gave the song a positive review accepting the change of style by stating "Make no mistake, Nicki's solo singles--'Massive Attack,' 'Check It Out' and 'Your Love'--all have distinct qualities, but none of them has truly captured Nicki's blinding charisma the way some of her guest verses have. Maybe that's all going to change with 'Right Thru Me.'" Paul Cantor of MTV News commented on the change in pace for Minaj, stating "One thing that's noticeably absent from the song is the different character voices Nicki's become known for. In the cover story of Complex magazine's October issue, she says the voices are something she's pulling back on."

== Music video ==
A music video for the single was shot over the weekend of October 1, 2010, in Los Angeles and directed by Diane Martel. Minaj commented on the concept of the music video stating "The concept of the video is boy-and-girl relationship drama, you know, all of the intimate stuff as well as the fighting as well as the self-reflecting type stuff. It's basically just a love story told from the perspective of a very hard girl who doesn't want to give in but she has to." A behind-the-scenes video was released on October 4, 2010. The music video was released for digital download on October 28, 2010.

=== Reception ===
On the day of its premier Rap-Up commented on the music video positively stating, "Hip-hop’s Barbie, who trades in her colorful wigs for a more natural look, shows off her acting chops as she argues with her man." James Montgomery of MTV Buzzworthy reviewed the music video during a behind a scenes look, stating "Yes, from her vast collection of neon wigs to her closet full of skintight outfits, Nicki is rarely, if ever, subtle. But in her upcoming video for 'Right Thru Me,' all of that has changed. Gone are the Kool-Aid accoutrements and Harajuku Barbie getups, replaced instead with a side of the rapper most of her fans have never seen before: a sensitive, softer one.

On the day of its actual release, Hillary Crosley of MTV News commented on the change in pace for Minaj in the video stating, "You can take the girl out of Queens, but you can't take the Queens out of the girl. Nicki Minaj premiered her stripped-down video for 'Right Thru Me' on MTV Wednesday (October 27), and it is quite a departure from her boisterous 'Check It Out' video that debuted Tuesday. Instead of blond hair and futuristic outfits, Nicki looks like she's about to walk down Jamaica Avenue in 50 Cent's hometown." An Idolator writer also gave the song a positive review stating "Our favorite thing about Nicki Minaj? Is it the kaleidoscopic fashion? Her obsession with toys? Or her flat-out astounding skills on the mic? While Nicki has blessed us with many things, perhaps our favorite thing about her is that she continues to surprise us. Witness: just two days after laughing it up in a cartoonish clip with will.i.am, she returns with what has to be her heaviest performance ever (yes, more so than Stuck On Broke) — watch her in a rare moment of vulnerability as she plays a disrespected woman in the just-premiered, 'borderline romantic' 'Right Thru Me'. Watch Nicki get personal."

Ed Easton Jr. of 92.3 Now gave the song an extremely positive review, also complimenting Minaj on her change in pace stating, "The flow of the song matches perfectly with the video – even though Nicki wasn’t “Barbied-Up” she still possesses that glow from her we’ve all grown to love. The video may not be filled with her signature random Japanese/Korean culture references or special effects but was still interesting to watch and definitely kept my attention. In all the video was a breath of fresh air for Minaj, bringing her image a little more down to earth for her fans so it deserves a 9 out of 10."

=== Continuation ===
Nicki Minaj premiered the movie for her third album "The Pinkprint" on December 19, 2014. The movie features Willy Monfret reprising his role as Minaj's boyfriend.

== Live performances ==
Minaj performed "Right Thru Me" on The Wendy Williams Show on November 17, on Late Show with David Letterman on November 18, 2010, and again on Live with Regis and Kelly on November 29, 2010. She later performed the track on Saturday Night Live on January 29, 2011. Minaj has also performed the song on her Pink Friday: Reloaded Tour.

== Charts and certifications ==
=== Weekly charts ===
Chart (2010–2011)	Peak position
Australian ARIA Urban Singles Chart	38
Canada Hot 100 (Billboard)	60
UK Hip Hop/R&B (Official Charts)	11
UK Singles (Official Charts)	71
US Billboard Hot 100	26
US Hot R&B/Hip-Hop Songs (Billboard)	4
US Hot Rap Songs (Billboard)	3
US Pop Airplay (Billboard)	32
US Rhythmic Airplay (Billboard)	7

=== Year-end charts ===
Chart (2011)	Position
US Hot R&B/Hip-Hop Songs (Billboard)	51

=== Certifications ===
Region	Certification	Certified units/sales
United States (RIAA)	Gold	500,000^{^}
^{^} Shipments figures based on certification alone.

== Radio dates and release history ==
Region	Date	Format
United States	September 24, 2010	Digital download
United States	October 5, 2010	Urban & Rhythmic radio
United States	November 2, 2010	Mainstream radio
United Kingdom	November 28, 2010	Digital download
