= Moment 4 Life =

2010 single by Nicki Minaj

Single by Nicki Minaj featuring Drake

from the album Pink Friday
- Released: December 7, 2010
- Recorded: 2010
- Studio: Glenwood Place Studios (Burbank)
- Genre: Hip-hop; R&B
- Length: 4:39; 3:46 (Radio Edit)
- Label: Young Money; Cash Money; Universal Motown
- Songwriters: Onika Maraj; Aubrey Graham; Tyler Williams; Nikhil Seetharam
- Producer: T-Minus

Nicki Minaj singles chronology
"Raining Men" (2010)	"Moment 4 Life" (2010)	"The Creep" (2011)

Drake singles chronology
"Fall for Your Type" (2010)	"Moment 4 Life" (2010)	"Put It Down" (2010)

Music video
- "Nicki Minaj - Moment 4 Life (Clean Version) ft. Drake" on YouTube

"Moment 4 Life" is a song by rapper Nicki Minaj, featuring rapper Drake, from Minaj's debut studio album, Pink Friday (2010). It was released on December 7, 2010 by Young Money, Cash Money, and Universal Motown as the fourth single from the album. The song was written by both artists, producer T-Minus and Nikhil Seetharam. It is a hip hop song that lyrically relates to maintaining a feeling of accomplishment and enjoying the moment.

The song peaked at number 13 on the US Billboard Hot 100. Internationally, it became a top 40 hit in Canada, Ireland, and the United Kingdom, and charted in Belgium and France. In the US, it has sold over two million digital downloads as of December 2014. The song received a nomination for Best Rap Performance at the 2012 Grammy Awards and a nomination for best collaboration at the 2011 MTV Video Music Awards. It also won the Soul Train Music Award for Rhythm & Bars.

== Composition ==
While writing Pink Friday, Minaj had a conversation with producer Irv Gotti where he told her to enjoy the moment in her career being a new star in music as the feeling only happens once. This sentiment inspired Minaj to write the song. During a session from the Pink Friday Diaries, Minaj added a background story to the song, stating: "[It] is about 2 kids that grew up on the same block. They shared their dreams of making it as rappers. They laughed together, they cried together. One day they realize that their dreams have come to fruition. Though they know all things come to an end, they celebrate. They wish that they could have this moment 4 Life." Lyrically, the song is about a desire to maintain a feeling of accomplishment. Drake follows Minaj in rapping about the same theme of enjoying the moment. MTV wrote, "Straying away from the standard rap song construction of three verses and a hook, Nicki performs a brain-dump of sorts on the track, spitting as if she's making a speech to both her fans and detractors."

== Critical reception ==
Brad Wete of Entertainment Weekly called the song " "triumphant" and stated that, along with the album's two lead singles, it showcases [Minaj's] knack for melody while boasting lyrics chronicling her struggles–be they professional or intimate ones of love and hurt. All of which are way more poignant than raps about how dope she is." Alexis Petridis of The Guardian disliked the pop- and R&B-influenced tracks of the album, writing that in the song "she sounds bored rigid, which rather makes you wonder where showing off one's musical versatility ends and cravenly softening your sound for the marketplace begins." Scott Plagenhoef of Pitchfork felt Minaj was "upstaged by Drake" on the track, "but these tracks—plus the Rihanna collaboration "Fly" and the solo ballad "Save Me"—are the best examples of what Pink Friday is rather than what many of us wanted it to be." Jesse Cataldo of Slant Magazine said that "Minaj's deranged wildness could potentially provide a foil for Drake, cutting into his tendency to work slowly and calmly [...] Instead, Minaj backs off from an early round of forcefulness, letting Drake dictate the pace of the song. It's this seeming lack of confidence, contradictory to the poise she shows elsewhere". Nick Levine of Digital Spy UK gave the track 4 out of 5 starts, commenting that "yes, the track itself - melodic and portentous(ish) midtempo R&B - is decent, but 'Moment 4 Life' is inevitably all about its frontline duo, arguably the most exciting male and female rhyme merchants of our times."

== Chart performance ==
The song debuted on the US Hot R&B/Hip-Hop Songs at number 56 and the US Hot Rap Songs at number 17 due to strong digital sales and heavy radio play, following the album's release. It became Minaj's first number-one song on the R&B/Hip-Hop Songs chart, and also managed to top the Rap Songs chart. On the Billboard Hot 100, "Moment 4 Life" peaked at number 13 making it her highest-charting song on the chart at the time. As of December 2014, the single has sold 2 million copies in the US. In the UK, the single debuted on the singles chart at number 135, in its second week it rose to 55 due to strong digital sales. On February 13, 2011, the single entered the UK top 40 at a current peak of 22, giving Nicki her second UK top 40 single (after her joint single "Check It Out" with will.i.am peaked at 11). It peaked at number 9 on the UK R&B Chart, becoming her third top 30 urban single to do so and her first top 10 UK R&B hit. In Europe, the song made appearance on Western charts, such as France, where the song peaked at 35 in March 2011, and stayed 18 weeks, becoming Minaj's first entry and Drake's second after "What's My Name?" by Rihanna in which he features, which peaked at number 16 and stayed 10 weeks. The song appeared in Dutch Charts equally, and Belgian charts, becoming also Minaj's first entry in these territories.

== Music video ==
=== Background ===
Filmed in late December 2010, the music video for the single was shot and directed by Chris Robinson. The president of Young Money Entertainment, Mack Maine, told MTV News, "We're still trying to work out the date for the next video with [Nicki] and Drake for the 'Moment 4 Life' video. That's the next project." "Moment 4 Life" is the first music video shot in a string of music videos to be released for promotion. In an interview on The Ellen DeGeneres Show, Minaj revealed that Roman Zolanski's mother, Martha Zolanski, will make a physical debut in the music video. In an interview with MTV News, Minaj discussed the marriage concept of the music video between her and her label-mate Drake, stating "Obviously, Drake and I, we’ve played around so much with the whole marriage thing and stuff like that, so people have come to be kind of intrigued about us and it's where we’re shooting the video together. So I was like, there has to be some sort of romantic storyline. It's Drake and me." Drake additionally added "I mean, it's a fantasy video. You’ve got a very regal environment, and you’ve got Nicki doing what she does—big outfits, big everything. Yeah, I love that girl, man. I’m not going to lie to you. The twist of it, the concept of it, I don't want to give it all away."

=== Synopsis ===
"Moment 4 Life" marked the onscreen debut of Martha Zolanski, mother of Roman Zolanski, an alter-ego played by Nicki Minaj.

The video for "Moment 4 Life" premiered on January 27, 2011, at 7:54 pm ET on MTV alongside an interview with Minaj. The video takes part in a type of Minaj-assisted fairy tale from a book. The video begins with Minaj sitting by a boudoir as Martha Zolanski appears as Minaj's fairy godmother. After discussing how Roman and Slim Shady have been sent to boarding school, Martha informs Nicki that this kind of fairy tale is different from ones she's seen, stating "These kinds of nights are fleeting and usually end by mid-night. But my fairy god mother senses tell me that you may have this moment for life." The song begins as Martha gifts Minaj with a special pair of heels. During Minaj's verse she is seen walking into a ballroom as she is spotted by Drake. When the two meet in a hall, Drake performs his verse with Minaj by a fireplace. During the climax of the song, Drake and Minaj walk down the aisle, where they share a wedding kiss by fireworks as the clock strikes midnight.

=== Critical reception ===
On the day of its premiere, James Montgomery of MTV News gave the video a very positive review and breakdown, stating, "So it's not exactly a stretch to call 'Moment 4 Life' the most Nicki Minaj video of all time. It takes basically every aspect of her personality – the fashionista, the glamazon, the princess, the badass, the cartoon character, the girly girl – and crams them together into one very shiny package. And then it wraps that package with nods to her past (the British accent, the mention of her Roman Zolanski alter-ego, the consummation of her Twit-lationship with Drake) for good measure. The end result is perhaps the most complete portrait of Minaj to date... There are very few silly wigs and nary a stitch of Spandex to be seen anywhere. It is basically our first glimpse at the real Nicki: a young woman who is more than just the sum of her parts, even if those parts are pretty interesting." Chris Robinson of Idolator compared and contrasted the "Moment 4 Life" wedding with other wedding music video's stating, "We’re going to call it right now. As of 2018, the video has more than 200 million views.

== Live performances ==
Minaj first performed the song at a Thanksgiving Party hosted by Hot 97 with Drake, and later performed their other song "Up All Night". Minaj also performed the song on the Lopez Tonight show as her alter ego Rosa without the assistance of Drake. While performing on VH1 Divas Support the Troops, Minaj performed the song for the men and women of the military without Drake again. During the performance, Minaj wore a fluffy white wig, turquoise tights, elongated heels and a super-snug, orange and blue mini-dress. Minaj performed the song for the holidays on many occasions, including a Christmas concert for Hot 97. During the Christmas special, Minaj wore a leopard-print bodysuit wrapped in a black cloth cage. Minaj additionally performed the song on a Manhattan rooftop during a pre-taped New Year's event on NBC's New Year's Eve with Carson Daly. Minaj performed the song with the assistance of Drake at the New Year's celebration "All Pink Everything Belvedere Vodka" she also hosted. During the performance, Minaj wore black and gold piece with multi-colored hair. Minaj most recently performed the song on The Ellen DeGeneres Show, minus Drake, in a black cocktail dress, blonde hair, and signature "Barbie" chain. Minaj performed the song on her first appearance on Saturday Night Live, where she wore a colorful full bodysuit and performed the song minus Drake. The rapper performed the song on her first headlining tour, the Pink Friday Tour. She has also added this song to her Pink Friday: Reloaded Tour, The Pinkprint Tour and to The Nicki Wrld Tour. During her concert at 2014 iHeartRadio Music Festival, Minaj also performed the song. On May 30, 2015, Minaj also performed the song on the iHeartRadio Summer Pool Party 2015 in Las Vegas.

== Track listing ==
- UK Promo CD single
1. "Moment 4 Life" (Clean Radio Edit) - 3:46

== Personnel ==
Credits are taken from Pink Friday liner notes.

- Vocals (Rap and sung by): Nicki Minaj, Drake
- Producing: T-Minus
- Recording: Ariel Chobaz & Noah "40" Shebib
  - Assisted by: Lyttleton "Cartwheel" Carter & Noel Cadastre
- Mix engineer: Ariel Chobaz
  - Assisted by: Lyttleton "Cartwheel" Carter

== Charts ==
=== Weekly charts ===
2010–2011 weekly chart performance for "Moment 4 Life"
Chart (2010–2011)	Peak position
Belgium (Ultratip Bubbling Under Flanders)	23
Canada Hot 100 (Billboard)	27
Canada CHR/Top 40 (Billboard)	16
France (SNEP)	35
Ireland (IRMA)	37
Netherlands (Dutch Tipparade 40)	9
Netherlands (Single Top 100)	51
Romania (Romanian Top 100)	91
Scottish Singles Sales (Official Charts)	24
UK Singles (Official Charts)	22
UK Hip Hop/R&B (Official Charts)	9
US Billboard Hot 100	13
US Hot R&B/Hip-Hop Songs (Billboard)	1
US Hot Rap Songs (Billboard)	1
US Pop Airplay (Billboard)	18
US Rhythmic Airplay (Billboard)	2

2026 weekly chart performance for "Moment 4 Life"
Chart (2026)	Peak position
Nigeria Airplay (TurnTable)	88

=== Year-end charts ===
2011 year-end chart performance for "Moment 4 Life"
Chart (2011)	Position
Canada (Canadian Hot 100)	92
UK Singles (Official Charts Company)	152
US Billboard Hot 100	50
US Hot R&B/Hip-Hop Songs (Billboard)	9
US Rhythmic (Billboard)	10

== Certifications ==
Certifications and sales for "Moment 4 Life"
Region	Certification	Certified units/sales
Australia (ARIA)	2× Platinum	140,000^{‡}
Brazil (Pro-Música Brasil)	Gold	30,000^{‡}
New Zealand (RMNZ)	2× Platinum	60,000^{‡}
United Kingdom (BPI)	Platinum	600,000^{‡}
United States (RIAA)	Platinum	2,000,000
^{‡} Sales+streaming figures based on certification alone.

== Release history ==
Release dates and formats for "Moment 4 Life"
Region	Date	Type
United States	December 7, 2010	Rhythmic contemporary (Rhythmic CHR) airplay
United States	January 4, 2011	Urban contemporary
United Kingdom	February 3, 2011	Mainstream airplay (BBC Radio 1)
