= Nicki Minaj videography =

Videos and media by American rapper

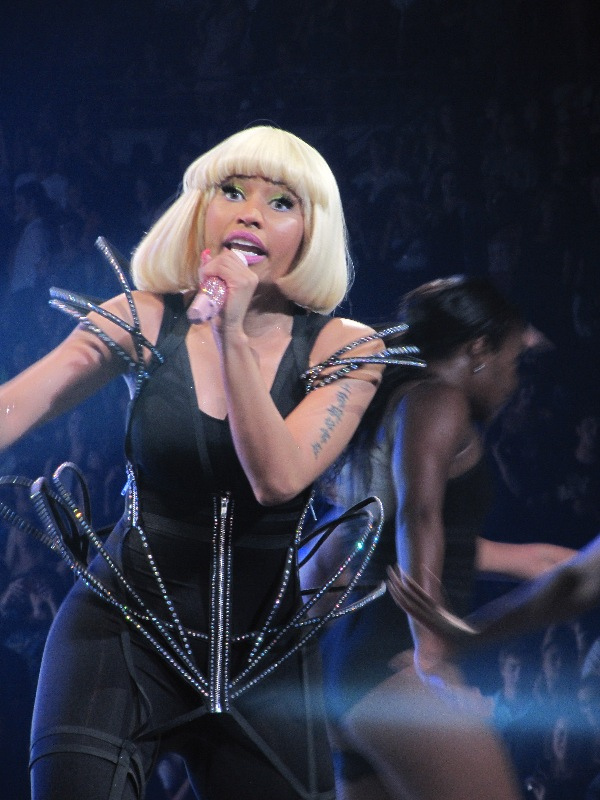
Nicki Minaj in 2011

Rapper Nicki Minaj has been featured in 89 music videos (55 as a lead artist and 51 as a featured artist), nine commercials, and four documentaries. Additionally, she has featured in four films: the animated The Angry Birds Movie 2 where she plays as a pink bird named Pinky, the animated Ice Age: Continental Drift in which she voiced the woolly mammoth, Steffie, Barbershop: The Next Cut in which she plays a sassy recruit named Draya, and The Other Woman, in which she played Lydia, an opinionated law-firm assistant. In 2009, Minaj signed a recording contract with Young Money Entertainment, and released her first solo music video under the label (for the single "Massive Attack") in March 2010.

The rapper released the first music video from Pink Friday, "Your Love", in July 2010. It was directed by Director X, which premiered on MTV and featured Michael Jai White as Minaj's love interest. She released "Super Bass" as the fifth single from Pink Friday, with the accompanying music video released on 5 May 2011, being noted particularly for the "glow in the dark" lap-dance scene. She has accumulated 20 music videos on her Vevo account with over 100 million views. The rapper has five MTV Video Music Awards for her video work: Best Hip Hop Video for "Super Bass" (2011), "Anaconda" (2015) and "Chun-Li" (2018), Best Female Video for "Starships" (2012), and Best Power Anthem as a feature in Megan Thee Stallion's "Hot Girl Summer" (2019).

Minaj has set the Vevo 24 hour viewing record with two separate videos in her channel, "Stupid Hoe" and "Anaconda", which earned 19.6 million views within its first 24 hours of release.

== Music videos ==
=== As lead artist ===
List of music videos, showing year released, director and mixtape
Title	Year	Director(s)	Ref.	Views (in millions)
"Warning"	2007	Jordan Tower		0.2
"Jump Off '07"	2007	Sal Green		5.1
"Wuchoo Know"	2007	Jordan Tower		0.8
"N.I.G.G.A.S"	2007	Jordan Tower		1.2
"Click Clack"	2007	Jordan Tower		0.07
"Dead Wrong"	2008	C Money		0.3
"Higher Than a Kite"	2008	Jordan Tower		0.5
"Go Hard"	2009	Koach K. Rich		6.7
"Itty Bitty Piggy"	2009	Hood Affairs		61
"Massive Attack" (featuring Sean Garrett)	2010	Hype Williams		81
"Your Love"	2010	Director X		196
"Check It Out" (with will.i.am)	2010	Rich Lee		128
"Right Thru Me"	2010	Diane Martel		119
"Moment 4 Life" (featuring Drake)	2010	Chris Robinson		284
"Super Bass"	2011	Sanaa Hamri		995
"Did It On'em"	2011	DJ Scoob Doo		20
"Fly" (featuring Rihanna)	2011	Sanaa Hamri		203
"Stupid Hoe"	2012	Hype Williams		134
"Beez in the Trap" (featuring 2 Chainz)	2012	Benny Boom		243
"Starships"	2012	Anthony Mandler		500
"Right by My Side" (featuring Chris Brown)	2012	Benny Boom		556
"Pound the Alarm"	2012	Benny Boom		299
"I Am Your Leader" (featuring Cam'ron and Rick Ross)	2012	Colin Tilley		52
"Come on a Cone"	2012	Grizz Lee		4.7
"The Boys" (with Cassie)	2012	Colin Tilley		215
"Va Va Voom"	2012	Hype Williams		147
"Freedom"	2012	Colin Tilley		36
"High School" (featuring Lil Wayne)	2013	Benny Boom		365
"Up in Flames"	2013	Grizz Lee		4.4
"Lookin Ass"	2014	Nabil		62
"Pills n Potions"	2014	Diane Martel		284
"Anaconda"	2014	Colin Tilley		1061
"Bang Bang" (with Jessie J and Ariana Grande)	2014	Hannah Lux Davis		1821
"Only" (featuring Drake, Lil Wayne and Chris Brown)	2014	Hannah Lux Davis		564
"The Crying Game"*	2015	Taylor Cohen		N/A
"I Lied"*	2015	Francesco Carrozzini		N/A
"Grand Piano"*	2015	Taylor Cohen		N/A
"Feeling Myself" (featuring Beyoncé)	2015	Alek Keshishian		140
"The Night Is Still Young"	2015	Hannah Lux Davis		220
"Make Love" (with Gucci Mane)	2017	Eif Rivera		31.4
"No Frauds" (with Drake and Lil Wayne)	2017	Benny Boom		236
"Regret in Your Tears"	2017	Mert and Marcus		27
"MotorSport" (with Migos and Cardi B)	2017	Bradley & Pablo and Quavo		643.5
"She For Keeps" (with Quality Control and Quavo)	2018	Daps and Quavo		32.9
"Chun-Li" (vertical video)	2018			32
"Barbie Tingz"	2018	Giovanni Bianco and Nicki Minaj		132
"Chun-Li"	2018	Steven Klein		205
"Bed" (featuring Ariana Grande)	2018	Hype Williams		107
"Ganja Burn"	2018	Mert and Marcus		58
"Barbie Dreams"	2018	Hype Williams		160
"Good Form"	2018	Colin Tilley		316
"Hard White"	2019	Mike Ho		38
"Megatron"	2019	Mike Ho		162
"Tusa (with Karol G)"	2019	Mike Ho		1340
"Trollz (with 6ix9ine)"	2020	CanonF8, David Wept & 6ix9ine		434
"What' That Speed About?!" (with Mike WiLL Made-It & YoungBoy Never Broke Again)	2020	Edgar Esteves, Austin McCraken		43
"Boyz" (with Jesy Nelson)	2021	Harry James		25
"Do We Have A Problem?" (featuring Lil Baby)	2022	Benny Boom		39
"Do We Have A Problem? (Short Version)" (featuring Lil Baby)	2022	Benny Boom		9.4
"Blick Blick" (with Coi Leray)	2022			36
"We Go Up" (featuring Fivio Foreign)	2022	Andre "DreVinci" Jones		37
"Tukoh Taka" (featuring Maluma & Myriam Fares)	2022	Edgar Esteves, Juan Felipe Zuleta		
"Super Freaky Girl"	2022	Joseph Kahn		58
"Red Ruby Da Sleeze"	2023	[unknown]		39
"Barbie World" (Featuring Ice Spice & Aqua)	2023	Hannah Lux Davis		173

- ^*: Released together as 'The Pinkprint Movie'.

=== As featured artist ===
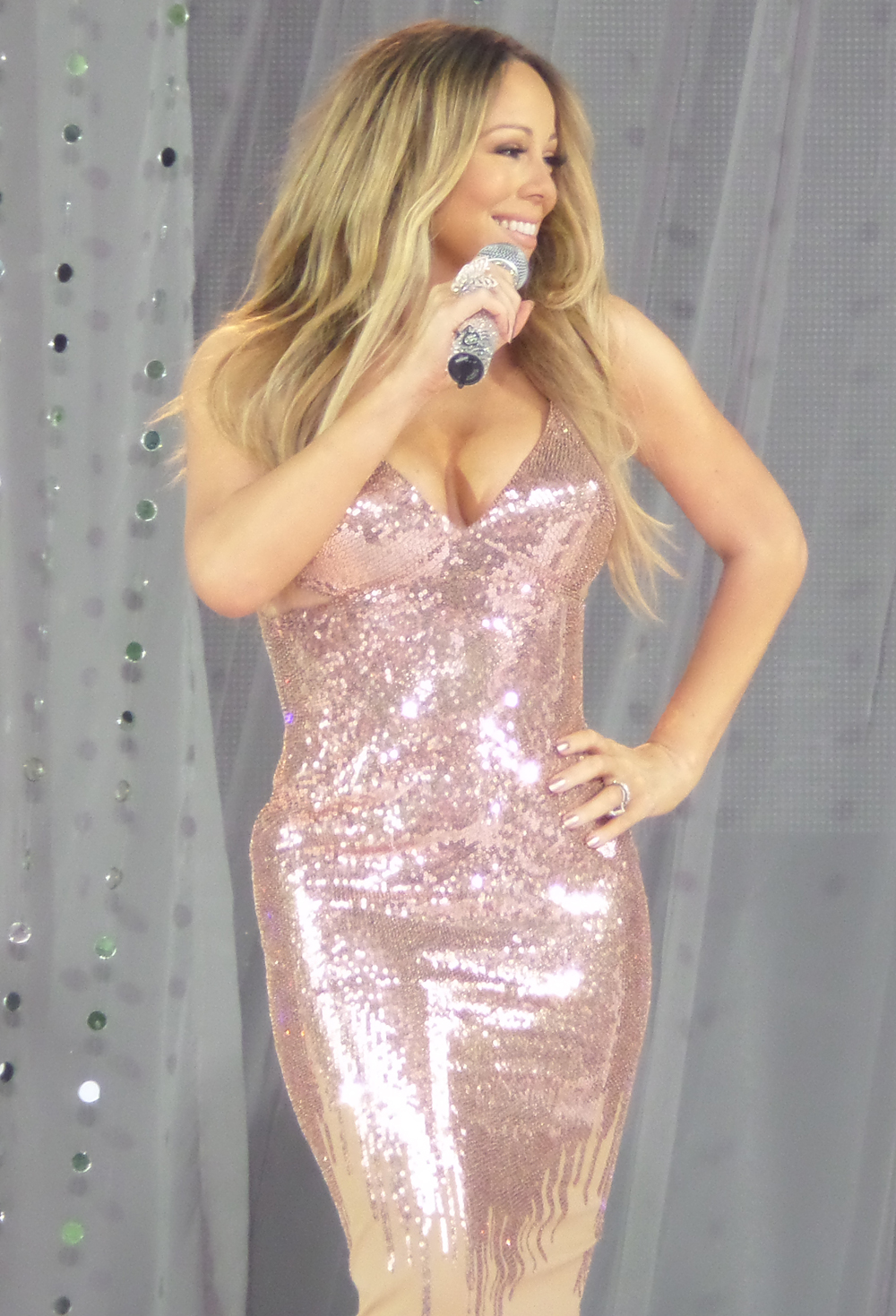
Minaj appears as a guest artist on Mariah Carey's (pictured) single "Up Out My Face"

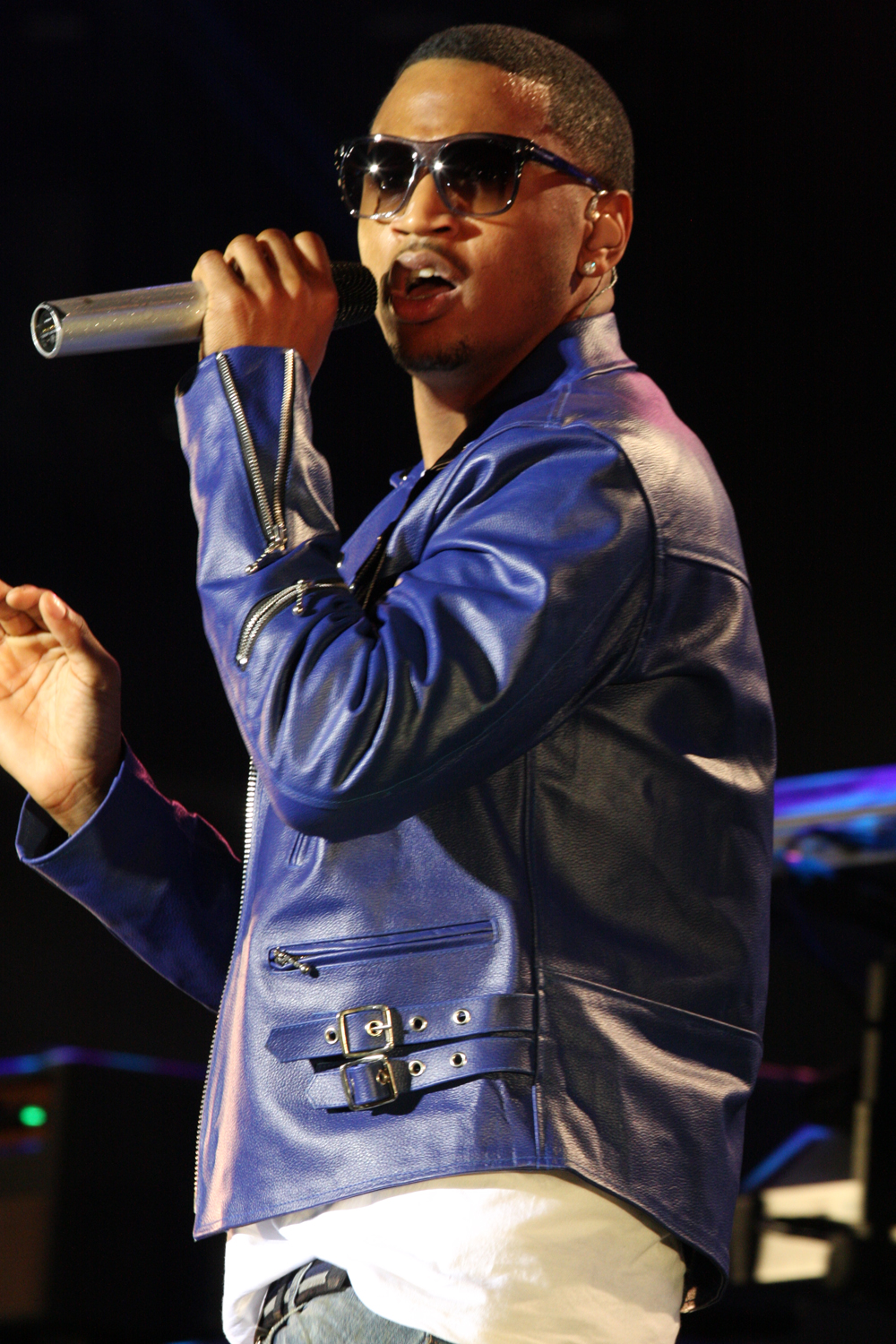
Minaj is a guest vocalist on Trey Songz (pictured) song "Bottoms Up".

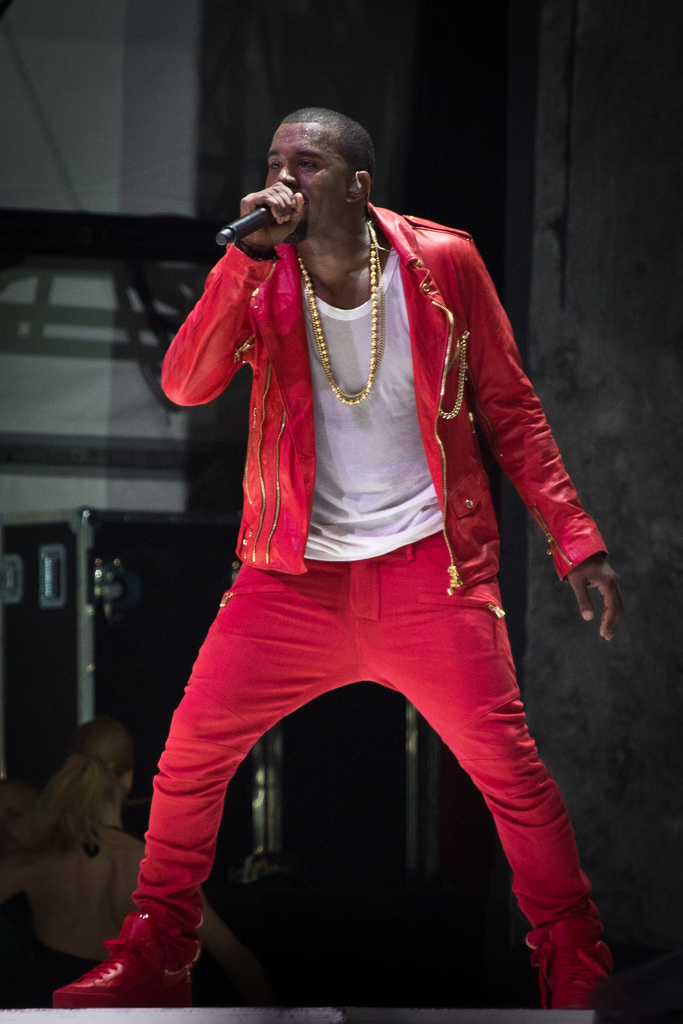
Minaj is a guest vocalist on Kanye West's (pictured) song "Monster".

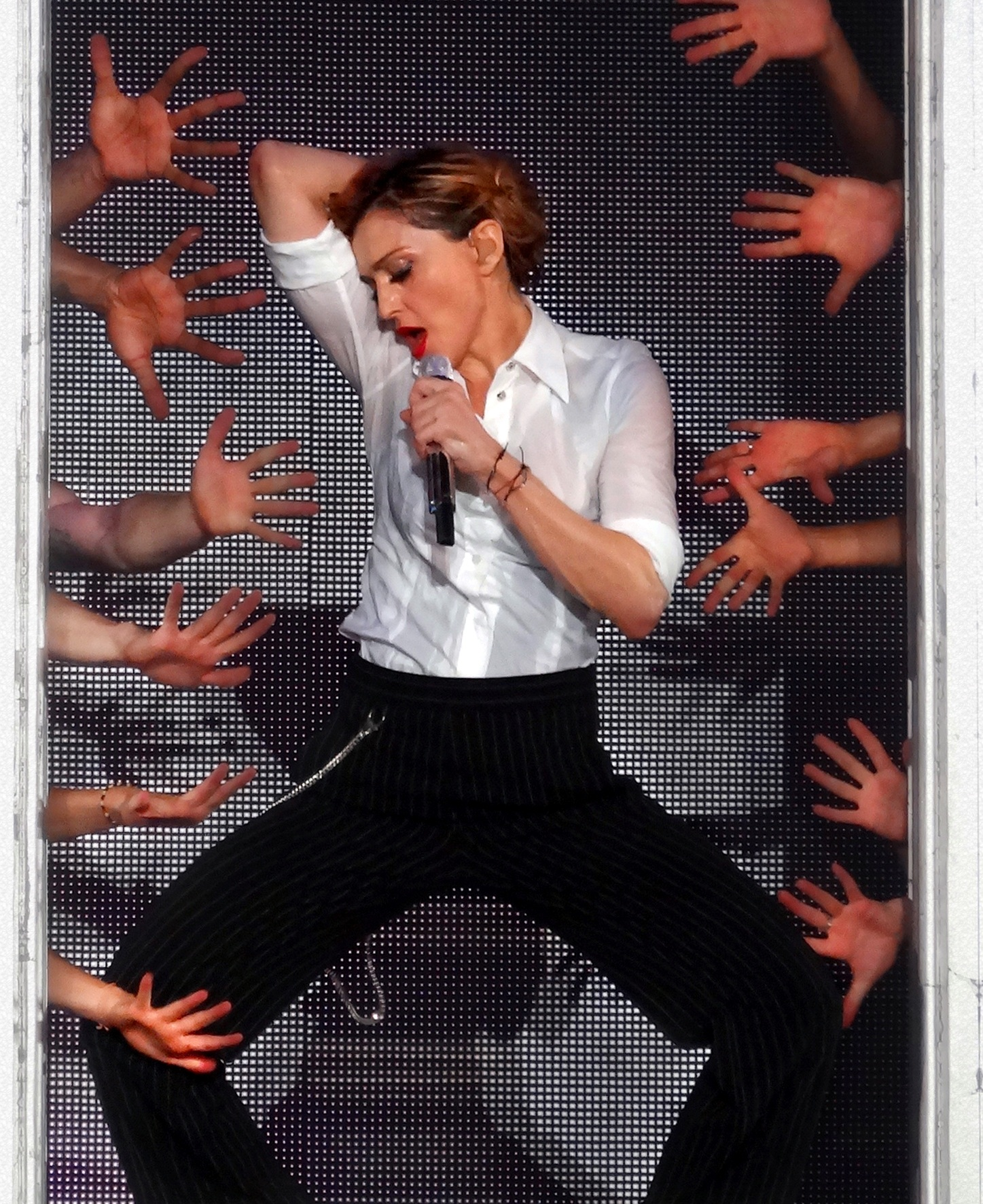
Minaj is a guest vocalist on Madonna's songs "Gimme All Your Luvin" and "Bitch I'm Madonna".

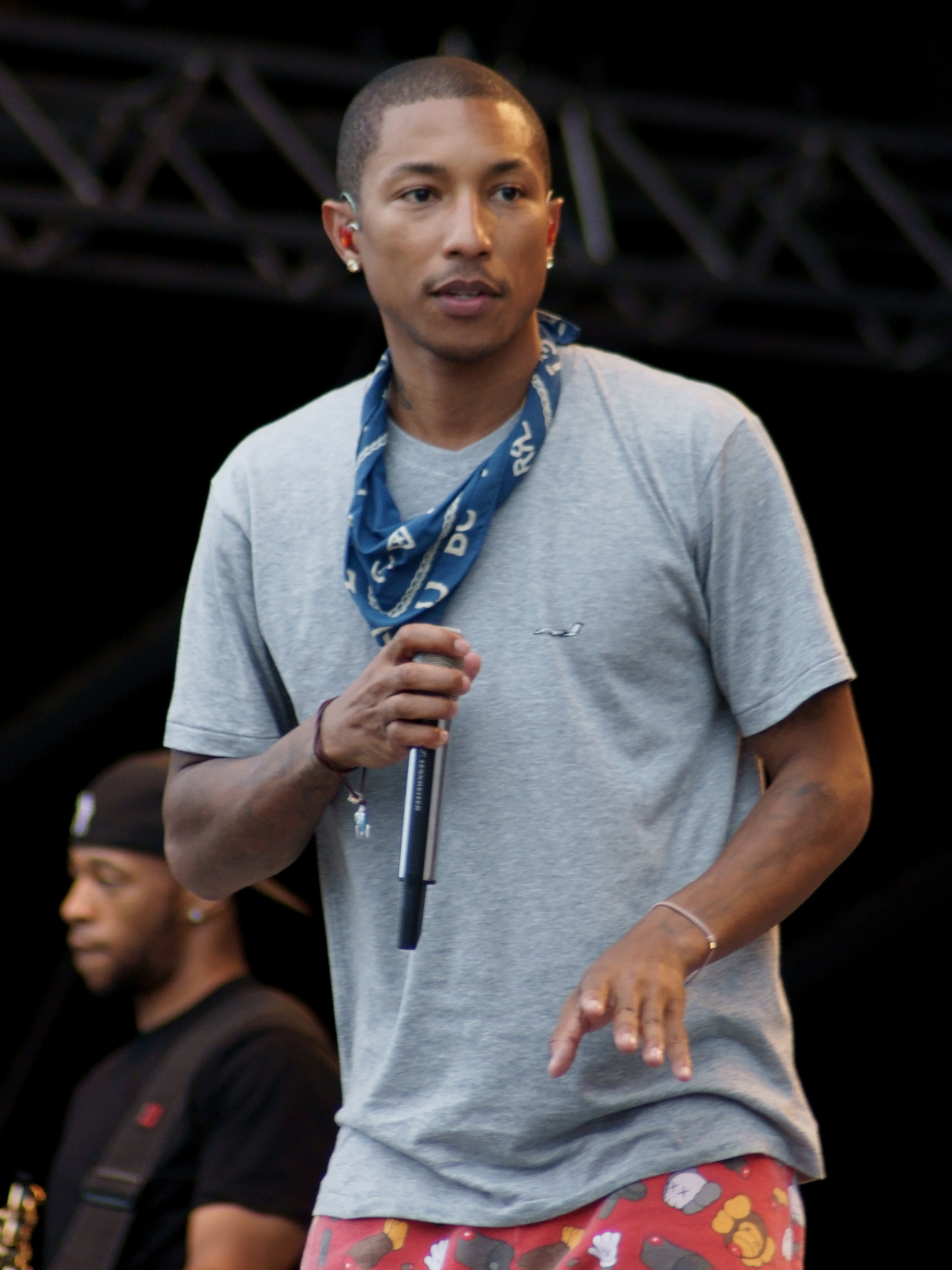
Pharrell Williams features, with Minaj, on "Get Like Me".

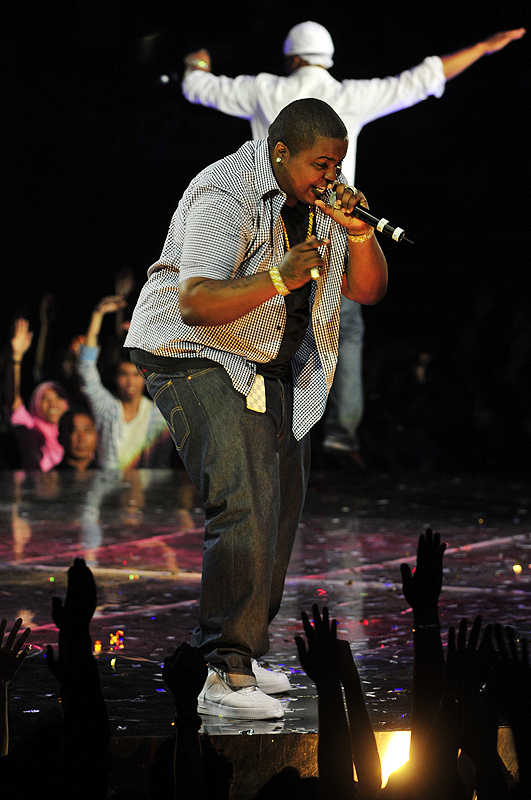
Minaj, features on Sean Kingston's single "Letting Go (Dutty Love)".

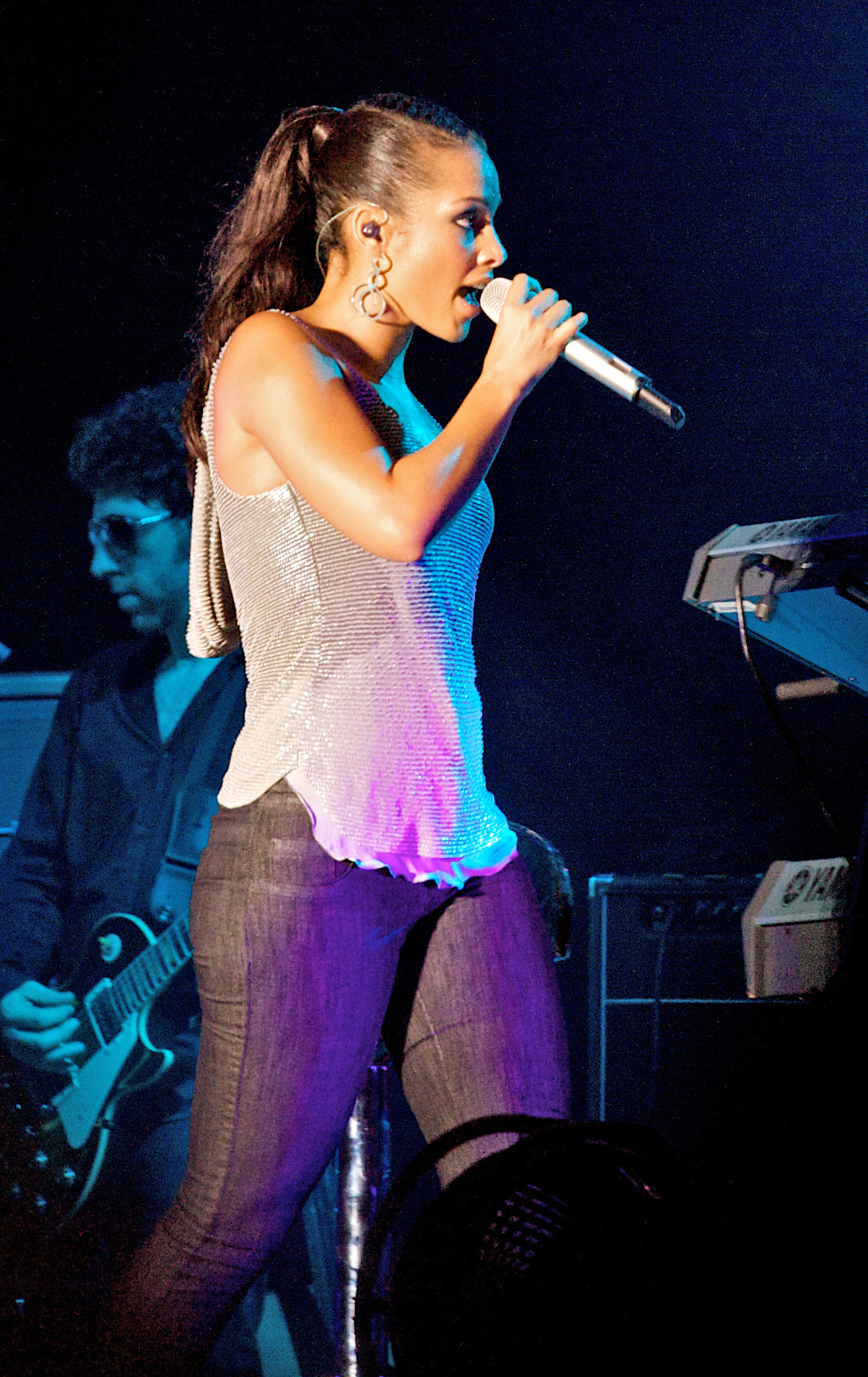
Minaj, features on Alicia Keys's single "Girl on Fire".

List of music videos, showing year released, director and album
Title	Year	Director(s)	Ref.	Views (in millions)
"5 Star" (Remix) (Yo Gotti featuring Gucci Mane, Trina and Nicki Minaj)	2009	Rage		15.4
"BedRock" (with Young Money featuring Lloyd)	2009	Dayo		274
"Up Out My Face" (Mariah Carey featuring Nicki Minaj)	2010	Nick Cannon		64
"My Chick Bad" (Ludacris featuring Nicki Minaj)	2010	Taj Stansberry		140.8
"Roger That" (with Young Money)	2010	Phenom		21.7
"Lil Freak" (Usher featuring Nicki Minaj)	2010	Anthony Mandler		34
"Knockout" (Lil Wayne featuring Nicki Minaj)	2010	Jeff Panzer, Dwayne Carter		75
"Get It All" (Sean Garrett featuring Nicki Minaj)	2010	Gil Green		3.6
"Hello Good Morning" (Remix) (Diddy-Dirty Money featuring Nicki Minaj and Rick Ross)	2010	Hype Williams		13.2
"All I Do Is Win" (Remix) (DJ Khaled featuring T-Pain, Rick Ross, Busta Rhymes, Diddy, Nicki Minaj, Fabolous, Jadakiss, Fat Joe and Swizz Beatz)	2010	Dayo		28.6
"Bottoms Up" (Trey Songz featuring Nicki Minaj)	2010	Anthony Mandler		127
"2012 (It Ain't the End)" (Jay Sean featuring Nicki Minaj)	2010	Erik White		72
"Letting Go (Dutty Love)" (Sean Kingston featuring Nicki Minaj)	2010	Little X		56
"Monster" (Kanye West featuring Jay-Z, Rick Ross, Bon Iver and Nicki Minaj)	2010	Jake Nava		N/A
"I Ain't Thru" (Keyshia Cole featuring Nicki Minaj)	2010	Benny Boom		23
"The Creep" (The Lonely Island featuring Nicki Minaj)	2011	Akiva Schaffer		111
"Where Them Girls At" (David Guetta featuring Flo Rida and Nicki Minaj)	2011	Dave Meyers		335
"Y.U. Mad" (Birdman featuring Nicki Minaj and Lil Wayne)	2011	Gil Green		56.2
"Fireball" (Willow featuring Nicki Minaj)	2011	Hype Williams		N/A
"Dance (A$$)" (Remix) (Big Sean featuring Nicki Minaj)	2011	Mike Waxx, Mike Carson		110
"Turn Me On" (David Guetta featuring Nicki Minaj)	2012	Sanji Senaka		381
"Give Me All Your Luvin'" (Madonna featuring Nicki Minaj and M.I.A.)	2012	MegaForce		81
"Take It to the Head" (DJ Khaled featuring Chris Brown, Rick Ross, Nicki Minaj and Lil Wayne)	2012	Colin Tilley		35.6
"I Luv Dem Strippers" (2 Chainz featuring Nicki Minaj)	2012	Benny Boom		41.3
"Out of My Mind" (B.o.B featuring Nicki Minaj)	2012	Benny Boom		29
"Get Low" (Waka Flocka Flame featuring Nicki Minaj, Tyga and Flo Rida)	2012	Benny Boom		8
"Beauty and a Beat" (Justin Bieber featuring Nicki Minaj)	2012	Justin Bieber, Jon M. Chu		1004
"Girl on Fire" (Inferno Version) (Alicia Keys featuring Nicki Minaj)	2012	Sophie Muller		36
"Freaks" (French Montana featuring Nicki Minaj)	2013	Eif Rivera		4
"Tapout" (Rich Gang featuring Lil Wayne, Future, Birdman, Mack Maine, and Nicki Minaj)	2013	Hannah Lux Davis		
"I'm Out" (Ciara featuring Nicki Minaj)	2013	Hannah Lux Davis		109
"Somebody Else" (Mario featuring Nicki Minaj)	2013	Alexandre Moors		
"Get Like Me" (Nelly featuring Nicki Minaj and Pharrell)	2013	Colin Tilley		14.5
"Clappers" (Wale featuring Nicki Minaj and Juicy J)	2013	Benny Boom		27.7
"Twerk It" (Busta Rhymes featuring Nicki Minaj)	2013	Director X		
"Love More" (Chris Brown featuring Nicki Minaj)	2013	Chris Brown		210
"I Wanna Be with You" (DJ Khaled featuring Nicki Minaj, Rick Ross and Future)	2013	Colin Tilley		46
"I B on Dat" (Meek Mill featuring Nicki Minaj, Fabolous and French Montana)	2013	Will Ngo		
"Give It All to Me" (Mavado featuring Nicki Minaj)	2013	Grizz Lee		
"My Nigga" (Remix) (YG featuring Lil Wayne, Nicki Minaj, Rich Homie Quan and Meek Mill)	2014	Motion Family		182
"Senile" (Young Money featuring Tyga, Lil Wayne and Nicki Minaj)	2014	Colin Tilley		69.9
"So Bad" (Cam'ron featuring Nicki Minaj and Yummy Bingham)	2014	Antwan Smith		
"Low" (Juicy J featuring Nicki Minaj, Lil Bibby and Young Thug)	2014	Benny Boom		55.5
"She Came to Give It to You" (Usher featuring Nicki Minaj)	2014	Philip Andelman		
"No Love" (Remix) (August Alsina featuring Nicki Minaj)	2014	Benny Boom		349
"Touchin, Lovin" (Trey Songz featuring Nicki Minaj)	2014	Jason Zada		83.3
"Throw Sum Mo" (Rae Sremmurd featuring Nicki Minaj and Young Thug)	2015	Motion Family, Michael Williams		173
"Hey Mama" (David Guetta featuring Nicki Minaj and Afrojack)	2015	Hannah Lux Davis		1543
"Bitch I'm Madonna" (Madonna featuring Nicki Minaj)	2015	Jonas Akerlund		348
"All Eyes on You" (Meek Mill featuring Nicki Minaj and Chris Brown)	2015	Benny Boom		457
"Back Together" (Robin Thicke featuring Nicki Minaj)	2015	Ben Mor		18.5
"No Broken Hearts" (Bebe Rexha featuring Nicki Minaj)	2016	Dave Meyers		301
"Side To Side" (Ariana Grande featuring Nicki Minaj)	2016	Hannah Lux Davis		2013
"Do You Mind" (DJ Khaled featuring Nicki Minaj, Chris Brown, August Alsina, Jeremih, Future and Rick Ross)	2016	Unknown		377
"Swalla" (Jason Derulo featuring Nicki Minaj and Ty Dolla $ign)	2017	Gil Green		1681
"Run Up" (Major Lazer featuring PartyNextDoor and Nicki Minaj)	2017	Paul, Luc & Martin		98.8
"Light My Body Up" ( David Guetta featuring Nicki Minaj and Lil Wayne)	2017	Benny Boom		40.8
"Kissing Strangers" (DNCE featuring Nicki Minaj)	2017	Marc Klasfeld		92
"You da Baddest" (Future featuring Nicki Minaj)	2017	Benny Boom		199.8
"Swish Swish" (Katy Perry featuring Nicki Minaj)	2017	Dave Meyers		663
"Rake It Up" (Yo Gotti featuring Nicki Minaj)	2017	Benny Boom		265.5
"You Already Know" (Fergie featuring Nicki Minaj)	2017	Bruno Ilogti		
"The Way Life Goes (Remix)" (Lil Uzi Vert featuring Nicki Minaj)	2017	Daps		81.8
" Krippy Kush (Remix)" (Farruko, Nicki Minaj and Bad Bunny featuring 21 Savage and Rvssian)	2017	Eif Rivera		128
"The Light Is Coming" (Ariana Grande featuring Nicki Minaj)	2018	Dave Meyers		65.5
"Big Bank" (YG featuring 2 Chainz, Big Sean and Nicki Minaj)	2018	Taj Stansberry		216
"Fefe" (6ix9ine featuring Nicki Minaj and Murda Beatz)	2018	TrifeDrew and William Asher		1010
"Idol" (BTS featuring Nicki Minaj)	2018	YongSeok Choi		153
"Goodbye" (Jason Derulo and David Guetta featuring Nicki Minaj and Willy William)	2018	Jason Derulo, David Strbik and Jeremy Strong		154.7
"Woman Like Me" (Little Mix featuring Nicki Minaj)	2018	Marc Klasfeld		334.7
"Dip" (Tyga featuring Nicki Minaj)	2018	Tyga and Arrad Rahgoshay		191
"Runnin'" (Mike Will Made It featuring ASAP Ferg, Nicki Minaj & ASAP Rocky)	2019			
"Wobble Up" (Chris Brown featuring Nicki Minaj and G-Eazy)	2019	Chris Brown and Arrad Rahgoshay.		81
"Hot Girl Summer" (Megan Thee Stallion featuring Nicki Minaj and Ty Dolla $ign)	2019	Munachi Osegbu		122.7
"Nice to Meet Ya" (Meghan Trainor featuring Nicki Minaj)	2020	Mathew Cullen		31
"Move Ya Hips" (A$AP Ferg featuring Nicki Minaj & MadeinTYO)	2020			
"Expensive" (Ty Dolla $ign featuring Nicki Minaj)	2020			
"Ya Lil" (Ramage featuring Nicki Minaj)	2020	Wael Farag, Ahmed El Gendy		
"Oh My Gawd (Dance Video)" (Mr Eazi & Major Lazer featuring Nicki Minaj & K4mo)	2020			
"Oh My Gawd" (Mr Eazi & Major Lazer featuring Nicki Minaj & K4mo)	2020			
"Love in the Way" (Yung Bleu featuring Nicki Minaj)	2022			
"WTF" (Young Boy NeverBrokeAgain featuring Nicki Minaj)	2023			
"Princess Diana" (Ice Spice featuring Nicki Minaj)	2023			
"Alone" (Kim Petras featuring Nicki Minaj)	2023			

=== Cameo appearances ===
List of music videos, showing year released, performer, director and album
Title	Year	Performer(s)	Director(s)	Ref.
"La Dee Da Dee"	2004	Park Slope; Hoodstarz	Unknown	
"Drop da Beat"	2008	Ru Spits	hiphopmovie.com	
"Got Money"	2008	Lil Wayne	Gil Green	
"Spotlight"	2009	Gucci Mane; Usher	Benny Boom	
"Bricks"	2009	Gucci Mane	Mr Boomtown	
"Make Tha Trap Say Aye"	2009	OJ da Juiceman	Unknown	
"I'm Single"	2010	Lil Wayne	DJ Scoob Doo	

== Filmography ==
=== Documentaries ===
List of documentaries, showing year released, TV network and notes
Title	Year	TV Network	Notes	Ref.
My Time Now	2010	MTV	Footage from 2010 VMA's, leading up to her debut album release.	
E! Special: Nicki Minaj	2011	E!	Journey to fame, childhood footage.	
Nicki Minaj: Day in the Life	2012	4Music	Behind-the-scenes footage of British promo run.	
Nicki Minaj: My Truth	2012	E!	Three part mini series	
My Time Again	2015	MTV	Footage from 2014 VMA's, the making and lead up to release of her third album.	
The BET Life of...Nicki Minaj	2015	BET	The story of Minaj's early days before becoming a prominent artist. This documentary also features rare interview footage.	
Nicki	TBA	TBA	Six part docu-series	

=== Television shows ===
List of television shows, showing year aired, character played and notes
Year	TV show	Role	Notes	Ref.
2010	My Super Sweet 16	Herself	Cameo appearance Appeared as Justin Combs surprise date / Performed	
2010	VH1 Divas: Salute the Troops	Herself	Performed "Girls Just Wanna Have Fun" with Katy Perry	
2011	New Year's Eve with Carson Daly	Herself	Performed "Moment 4 Life" and "Save Me"	
2011	Fashion Police	Herself	Guest judge	
2011	Saturday Night Live	Herself	Episode 693: "Jesse Eisenberg/Nicki Minaj" (season 36)	
2011	America's Next Top Model	Herself	Guest judge Episode: "Nicki Minaj" (Cycle 17)	
2011	America's Best Dance Crew	Herself	Season 6 Episode: "Nicki Minaj Challenge"	
2012	Dick Clark's New Year's Rockin' Eve with Ryan Seacrest	Herself	Performed "Turn Me On", "Super Bass", and "Roman in Moscow"	
2012	The Cleveland Show	Herself	Episode: "Menace II Secret Society" (Season 4); Voice role	
2013	American Idol	Herself	Main judge (Season 12)	
2014	The Fabulous Life of...	Herself	Season 9 Episode: "Nicki Minaj"	
2014	HSN	Herself	Exclusive fragrance launch	
2014	Steven Universe	Sugilite	Episode: "Coach Steven" (Season 1)	
2014	On the Run Tour: Beyoncé and Jay Z	Herself	Performed "Flawless" (Remix) alongside Beyoncé; HBO concert special	
2014	Saturday Night Live	Herself	Episode 774: "James Franco/Nicki Minaj"; Season 40	
2016	Steven Universe	Sugilite	Episode: "Know Your Fusion" (Season 4) (Archival recordings)	
2018	Black Ink Crew: Chicago	Herself	Guest appearance Episode: "Barbie Tingz" (season 4); Filmed getting a new tattoo	
2019	Saturday Night Live	Herself	Episode 850: "Tina Fey/Nicki Minaj" (season 43)	
2019	Keeping Up with the Kardashians	Herself	Guest appearance Teased collaboration with Kanye West; Episode: "Kourtney's Choice (season 16)	
2020	RuPaul's Drag Race	Herself	Guest judge Episode: "I'm That Bitch" (season 12)	
2021	The Real Housewives of Potomac	Herself	Co-host; Episode: "Reunion Part 4: Nicki Minaj Takeover" (season 6)	
2022	Carpool Karaoke	Herself	Episode: "Nicki Minaj Carpool Karaoke / Mark Wahlberg, Judy Greer, Sigrid	
2022	2022 MTV Video Music Awards	Herself	Co-Host	
2023	2023 MTV Video Music Awards	Herself	Host	

=== Video games ===
List of video games, showing year released, character played and notes
Year	Game	Role	Notes	Ref.
2023	Call of Duty: Modern Warfare II	Herself	Playable Character (DLC); Voice and Likeness	

=== Films as an actress ===
List of cinematic film releases, showing year released, role, director(s) and box office gross
Title	Year	Role	Director(s)	Budget	Box office	Ref.
Title	Year	Role	Director(s)	USD$ (millions)		Ref.
Ice Age: Continental Drift	2012	Steffie (voice)	Michael Thurmeier & Steve Martino	95	877.2	
The Other Woman	2014	Lydia	Nick Cassavetes	40	197	
Barbershop: The Next Cut	2016	Draya	Malcolm D. Lee	20	55	
The Angry Birds Movie 2	2019	Pinky (voice)	Thurop Van Orman	65	136	
Anaconda	TBA	TBA	Tom Gormican			
Total film gross as an actress				USD$1.285 billion		

=== Films as a personality ===
List of films, showing year released, character and notes
Film	Year	Character	Notes	Ref.
The Come Up DVD: Volume 11 (Carter Edition)	2007	Herself	Dirty Money Entertainment, cameo appearance, Pre-fame.	
The Come Up DVD: Volume 17 (Wayne World Edition)	2008	Herself	Dirty Money Entertainment, cameo appearance, Pre-fame.	
Britney Spears Live: The Femme Fatale Tour	2011	Herself	Cameo appearance, performer.	
The Re-Up DVD	2012	Herself	Box-set DVD, shows behind-the-scenes footage of the Pink Friday Tour, and other miscellaneous footage of Minaj.	
Justin Bieber's Believe	2013	Herself	Cameo appearance	

== Commercials ==
List of commercials, showing company/product, year released, director and description
Company/product	Year	Director(s)	Description	Ref.
MTV	2010	Michael John Warren	In promotion for the 2010 MTV Video Music Awards. The commercial uses an old-school, black and white styling.	
Pepsi	2012	Fredrik Bond	Pepsi's first global "Live For Now" campaign. A reworked version of Minaj's hit "Moment 4 Life" acted as theme. Designer Betsey Johnson made a cameo appearance.	
Adidas	2012	Melina Matsoukas	Adidas X Jeremy Scott commercial including cameos from Big Sean, 2NE1. Minaj fronts the campaign with her song "Masquerade", used as theme.	
iHeartRadio	2012	Unknown	Minaj, Usher, Katy Perry, Enrique Iglesias, Pitbull, One Direction and Christina Aguilera, appear to promote the iHeartRadio service.	
Pink Friday	2012	Benny Boom	First official fragrance by Minaj, it premiered on primetime in 2012, Freedom serves as theme.	
Beats Electronics	2013	Chris Waitt, Allen Hughes	Television commercial for the limited edition Nicki Minaj "Pink Pill". A pill shaped wireless speaker.	
Minajesty	2013	David LaChapelle	Television commercial for the second official fragrance by Minaj, the scenes were shot in a wooded area, in July 2012.	
Nicki Minaj Collection	2013	Jonas Åkerlund	Television commercial for Minaj's debut clothing line with shopyourway.com and Kmart.	
Myx Fusions	2014	TBA	Television commercial for Minaj's owned, fruit infused Moscato beverage.	
T-Mobile	2016	TBA	Promoting T-Mobile's unlimited data.	
Beats Electronics	2016	Brian Beletic	Promoting Beats Audio wireless headphones alongside Pharrell Williams, DJ Khaled and others.	
H&M	2017	Johan Renck	Promoting H&M's Holiday Collection.	
Mercedes-Benz	2018	Brian Beletic	Promoting Mercedes-Benz A-Class. The commercial featured a sample of Minaj's yet-to-be-released song "Good Form."	
EA Sports	2018	Neal Brennan	Promoting Madden NFL '19 alongside Quavo, Lil Dicky and others.	
Beats Electronics	2018	Dave Meyers	Promoting Beats by Dre alongside Nas and Serena Williams. The commercial featured the song "Majesty" from Minaj's recently released album "Queen" as well as a lyric from Kanye West's "Monster" featuring Minaj, Jay-Z and Rick Ross.	
