= Hard white =

Hard white may refer to:

- Hard white, slang/street name for cocaine
- Hard white soap
- Hard white wheat, often called "Hard white winter wheat"
- "Hard White (Up in the Club)", a music single by hip-hop artist Yelawolf featuring Lil Jon
- "Hard White", a 2018 song by Nicki Minaj from her fourth studio album, Queen
