= Barbie Dreams =

2018 single by Nicki Minaj

Single by Nicki Minaj

from the album Queen
- Released: August 14, 2018
- Studio: Glenwood Place Studios (Burbank, California); Larrabee Sound Studios (North Hollywood, California); Chris Athens Masters (Austin, Texas)
- Genre: Hip hop
- Length: 4:39
- Label: Young Money; Cash Money
- Songwriters: Rivelino Raoul Wouter; Onika Tanya Maraj; Christopher Smith; James Brown; Fred Wesley
- Producers: Mel & Mus; Ringo

Nicki Minaj singles chronology
"Fefe" (2018)	"Barbie Dreams" (2018)	"Goodbye" (2018)

Music video
- "Barbie Dreams" on YouTube

"Barbie Dreams" is a song recorded by rapper Nicki Minaj for her fourth studio album Queen (2018). It was released on August 14, 2018, to radio stations through Young Money Entertainment and Cash Money Records as the third single from the album. The song was written by Minaj, Rashad "Ringo" Smith, Alexander Roland, the duo Mel & Mus (composed of Melvin Hough II and Rivelino Raoul Wouter), Christopher Smith, James Brown, and Fred Wesley; while its production was done by Ringo, and Mel & Mus.

"Barbie Dreams" received widespread critical acclaim. It also received public recognition from many of the male rappers "roasted" in the song. Commercially, the song peaked at number 18 on the Billboard Hot 100 and entered the charts in Australia, Canada, and the United Kingdom. For promotion, Minaj debuted the track on her Queen Radio show on Beats 1, and performed the song live at the 2018 MTV Video Music Awards.

== Background and release ==
In a June 2018 Elle magazine interview, Minaj lamented the death of rap beef, something she loved and felt had dissipated, so she wanted to bring that energy back in a fun spirit. On August 10, 2018, Minaj revealed the final tracklist for her fourth studio album, Queen, that included a track titled "Barbie Dreams" at number three. It premiered a few hours later as part of the album on all major music platforms. To promote it as well as the 18 other tracks, Minaj played the song live on her Beats 1 Queen Radio show with Zane Lowe, and explained the message behind it. Four days later, as announced by Young Money, the song was sent to Rhythmic contemporary radio stations as the third single from the album, following "Bed", which features American singer Ariana Grande. The song's title "Barbie Dreams" also connects to Nicki Minaj's Barbie persona. She often dresses to portray a Barbie-like image, using Barbie as one of her alter egos.

== Composition and lyrics ==
"Barbie Dreams"
A 30-second sample of the song

"Barbie Dreams" is a hip hop song that is four minutes and thirty-nine seconds long. It contains interpolations from "Just Playing (Dreams)", written by Christopher Wallace and Smith, as performed by The Notorious B.I.G.; interpolations and samples from "Blues and Pants", written by Brown and Wesley, as performed by Brown. The song marks the second time Minaj rapped on B.I.G.'s "Just Playing (Dreams)" beat, as she previously used it on her track "Dreams" from her debut mixtape, Playtime Is Over (2007).

Lyrically, unlike the former who rapped about his attraction to popular female R&B singers, Minaj playfully insults prominent male rappers and athletes, who are mostly friends and collaborators of hers, with a few of them even featured on the album. The list includes Lil Wayne, Drake, Meek Mill, Dave East, Eminem, DJ Khaled, 50 Cent, Young Thug, Swae Lee, Lil Uzi Vert, Fetty Wap, Quavo, Bow Wow, Future, 6ix9ine, Special Ed, Desiigner, Kanye West, and YG. Several publications suggested that the song was a diss track, but Minaj has denied that and clarified during her Queen Radio show that the track only targeted individuals she loves. She also tweeted a similar statement, "I only mentioned people [...] that I fuk wit. This isn't a diss. Yikes. This is culture, this is BIGGIE!!!!! New York!!!! This is FUN." Furthermore, she uses the idea of Barbie, the iconic western doll to contradict normalized ideas of beauty being blond and thin. Instead, Nicki Minaj uses her Barbie persona to show she is just as beautiful without those traits. She shows the power of her body that she shows so much pride in. Minaj's recording engineer Big Juice explained the making process of the song saying, "She told me to load up that beat, put it on loop, and give her about twenty or thirty minutes. Then she goes in the booth and lays that shit down, and that’s what you got. I didn’t know what she was gonna say. I wanna say she did 90% of that in one take. She mumbled the hook when she was laying the verses, laid the rest of it, went back and put the hook in the middle."

Talking about her influences to make the song on her Queen Radio show, Minaj mentioned B.I.G. and Eminem saying, "Shout outs to B.I.G. [who] is still inspiring me every day. [...] I love dope writers who can write bars and make you laugh. Eminem [after that] too." She also cited 50 Cent's "How to Rob" as an inspiration on her Hot 97 interview, "It's so "How to Rob" [...] I wanna shoutout 50 because [...] he inspired that record so much. That's why it's the first person I say on the song."

== Critical reception ==
The song received widespread critical acclaim. Mosi Reeves of Rolling Stone commented on the song, "The centerpiece is 'Barbie Dreams,' a viral revision of The Notorious B.I.G.'s 'Just Playing (Dreams).'" While Biggie drooled over "R&B bitches," Nicki Minaj "dreams of fucking one of these little rappers," and cuts them down to size in the process. "Drake worth a 100 million, always buying me shit/But I don't know if the pussy wet or if he crying and shit," she rhymes, subtly poking fun at Drake's sad boy persona." Kathy Iandoli of Billboard called the song a standout track on the album. Ben Beaumont-Thomas of The Guardian stated, "It is the perfect track for a gossipy, meme-obsessed age, and Minaj smartly puts herself at the front of the social media conversation.", Brianna Younger of Pitchfork thought that the single is a "flamethrowing pink slip delivered with a wink. Positioning some of rap’s biggest names in her crosshairs".

In Variety, A.d. Amorosi described it as a "hilarious rap attack modeled after the Notorious B.I.G.'s "Just Playing (Dreams)" and its rip on popular female R&B singers of his day — except this time, it's the men of hip-hop who get a playful beat-down." Spin's Israel Daramola advanced "Echoing Biggie, Minaj reminds us throughout "Barbie Dreams" that "she's just playing." Still, what makes the song so great is that it's just mean and personal enough to make you wonder if maybe she isn't. The song doesn't leave you thinking about whether Minaj went too far, but instead reveling in her gleeful hacking away at the pride of the men who dominate the genre. For one song, at least, Queen accomplishes its goal."

In December 2018, Billboard ranked "Barbie Dreams" as the 95th best song of the year, where Christine Werthman wrote that she "uses her verses to roast some famous rappers (and one football player)" and "though whether or not that lessened the sting of the slaps she delivered is still up for debate."

== Music video ==
Screenshot from the music video for Minaj's 2018 single "Barbie Dreams" featuring Minaj holding the DJ Khaled like Hand puppet in the music video of the song

The accompanying music video for "Barbie Dreams" was directed by Hype Williams and it premiered on September 10, 2018, after Minaj radio show Queen Radio on Beats1 Apple. It was made available on the singer's official YouTube account.

=== Synopsis ===
The video begins with a Muppet (audience applauding) welcoming the audience to the "Barbie's Dreams" Show then the video cuts to Minaj ascending as she pays homage to The Notorious B.I.G with the line "R.I.P. to B.I.G Classic shit" most of the scenes features Minaj dancing, grinding and making faces in a variety of different outfits and hair colors. The video features Hand puppet muppet-like versions of Hip-Hop performers mentioned on the track and why she would or would not have sex with them, The Muppet's are all male rappers (in order): 50 cent, Meek Mill, 6ix9ine, Dj Khaled, Lil Wayne, and Quavo.

== Commercial performance ==
"Barbie Dreams" debuted at number 18 on the US Billboard Hot 100, dropped to number 38 in its second week, and left the top 40 in its third week.

== Live performances ==
Minaj first performed the song on August 20, 2018, in a medley of "Majesty", "Barbie Dreams", "Ganja Burns", and "Fefe" live from the PATH World Trade Center station at the 2018 MTV Video Music Awards. On September 4, 2018, Minaj performed the song in the medley of "Barbie Dreams", "Ganja Burn", and "Fefe" during the premiere show of sixteenth season of The Ellen DeGeneres Show. Minaj also performed the song as part of her setlist on The Nicki Wrld Tour, during her shows in London and Birmingham.

== Credits and personnel ==
Credits and personnel adapted from Queen album liner notes.

Recording

- Recorded at Glenwood Place Studios, Burbank, California
- Mixed at Larrabee Sound Studios, North Hollywood, California
- Mastered at Chris Athen Masters, Austin, Texas

Personnel

- Nicki Minaj – vocals
- Rashad "Ringo" Smith – production
- Mel & Mus
- Aubry "Big Juice" Delaine – record engineering
- Laura Bates – record engineering assistance
- Todd Bergman – record engineering assistance
- Jaycen Joshua – mixing
- David Nakaji – mixing assistance
- Ben Milchev – mixing assistance
- Chris Athens – mastering

== Charts ==
Chart performance for "Barbie Dreams"
Chart (2018)	Peak position
Australia (ARIA)	57
Canada Hot 100 (Billboard)	43
Ireland (IRMA)	41
New Zealand Hot Singles (RMNZ)	3
Scottish Singles Sales (Official Charts)	60
Slovakia Singles Digital (ČNS IFPI)	92
Sweden Heatseeker (Sverigetopplistan)	7
UK Singles (Official Charts)	36
US Billboard Hot 100	18
US Hot R&B/Hip-Hop Songs (Billboard)	12
US Rhythmic Airplay (Billboard)	12

== Certifications ==
Certifications for "Barbie Dreams"
Region	Certification	Certified units/sales
Australia (ARIA)	Platinum	70,000^{‡}
Brazil (Pro-Música Brasil)	Gold	20,000^{‡}
New Zealand (RMNZ)	Platinum	30,000^{‡}
United Kingdom (BPI)	Silver	200,000^{‡}
United States (RIAA)	Gold	500,000^{‡}
^{‡} Sales+streaming figures based on certification alone.

== Release history ==
Release history and formats for "Barbie Dreams"
Region	Date	Format	Label	Ref.
Various	August 10, 2018	Digital download; streaming	Young Money; Cash Money	
United States	August 14, 2018	Rhythmic contemporary radio	Young Money; Cash Money	
