= Hard White (song) =

2019 song by Nicki Minaj

Song by Nicki Minaj

from the album Queen
- Released: January 31, 2019
- Studio: Glenwood Place Studios (Burbank, California); Larrabee Sound Studios (North Hollywood, California); Chris Athens Masters (Austin, Texas)
- Genre: Hip hop
- Length: 3:13
- Label: Young Money; Cash Money
- Songwriter(s): Onika Maraj, Matthew Samuels, Ramon Ibanga Jr., Brittany Hazard
- Producer(s): Boi-1da, !llmind

Music video
- "Hard White" on YouTube

"Hard White" is a song by Nicki Minaj from her fourth studio album Queen (2018). In an interview with Zane Lowe, Nicki stated that the track was recorded in early 2017 in Paris. The song was originally leaked under the title "Half Back". The music video for the song was released on January 31, 2019.

== Background ==
A track under the name of "Half Back" was leaked in April 2018. In August it was confirmed by the song's producer Illmind that the original title was "Half Back" before it was changed to "Hard White". He commented that the song has Minaj "in rare form" and that it showcases her rap abilities.

== Reception ==
Bryan Rolli from Forbes characterized how Minaj "rides the hypnotic trap beat" of "Hard White" while singing "a delightfully Auto-Tuned chorus that takes cues from Migos’ tried-and-tested formula". Stephanie Smith-Strickland from Entertainment Weekly outlined how the track, alongside Minaj's other solo tracks "Good Form" and "Barbie Dreams", "[displays] her innate lyrical skill".

== Live performances ==
Minaj performed the track live at the TIDAL X Vivo concert in São Paulo, Brazil. The song was on the setlist of her The Nicki Wrld Tour (2019) and Pink Friday 2 World Tour (2024)

== Music video ==
Nicki announced via her Instagram on 30 January 2019 that she would be releasing the music video later at midnight. Directed by Mike Ho, the video opens with Nicki striding confidently towards her throne, adorned with a spiked crown and a flowing black gown, all while declaring, "my legacy could never be undone." She wears a variety of different costumes in the clip, with undead creatures lurking around her.

In the video, Nicki Minaj appears to take subtle jabs at both rapper Drake and the Grammys according to media. The video features visuals of a scorpion breaking into pieces, seemingly referring to Drake's studio album Scorpion (2018), and Minaj's lyrics contain elements that could be interpreted as directed towards him. She appears to take a jab at the Grammys by featuring a gramophone that resembles a Grammy statue while she raps, "I'm the trophy of the game, everybody's trying to win me". It was also speculated that Minaj shades rapper Cardi B with the lyrics "I ain’t never played a ho position / I ain’t never had to strip to get the pole position", but that was debunked by Minaj in an interview with Zane Lowe.

Althea Legaspi from Rolling Stone India noted its "imagery of dark rituals", and how "Minaj affirms her reign, taking a seat at the throne". Nia Groce from Hypebeast called the visuals of the video "haunting" and "cryptic-themed". Jovem Pan described how "in a very futuristic plot, the rapper transforms into a queen and exudes personality".

== Credits ==
Personnel:

- Composer: Onika Maraj, Brittany Hazzard, Matthew Samuels, Ramon Ibanga Jr.
- Producer: Boi1da, !llmind
- Mixer: Jaycen Joshua, Aubry "Big Juice" Delaine
- Assistant mixer: Bne Milchev, Laura Bates, David Nakaji
- Recording engineer: Aubry "Big Juice" Delaine
- Assistant recording engineer: Yann Bordeo, Ludovick Tartavel, Iain Findley, Jordon Silva
