= Touch Down (song) =

2018 single by Stylo G

"Touch Down (Remix)"

Single by Stylo G featuring Nicki Minaj and Vybz Kartel
- Released: May 10, 2018; December 9, 2018 (Nicki Minaj and Vybz Kartel version)
- Genre: Hip hop; dancehall
- Length: 3:15
- Label: 3Beat; Young Money
- Songwriters: McDermott; Maraj; Palmer
- Producer: The FaNaTiX

Stylo G singles chronology
"Contigo" (2018)	"Touch Down (Remix)" (2018)

Nicki Minaj singles chronology
"Good Form" (2018)	"Touch Down (Remix)" (2018)	"Dumb Blonde" (2019)

Vybz Kartel singles chronology
"Girlfriend" (2017)	"Touch Down (Remix)" (2018)

Audio video
- "Touch Down Remix" on YouTube

Touch Down (Remix) is a song by the British rapper Stylo G, the Jamaican singer Vybz Kartel, and the American rapper Nicki Minaj. It is a remix of the song "Touch Down" by Stylo G. The song's lyrics are credited to The FaNaTiX, Stylo G & Minaj, and production was handled by the FaNaTiX .

== Composition ==
"Touch Down" was written and produced by the FaNaTiX, Stylo G and Minaj. It features vocals from Vybz Kartel and FaNaTiX provided additional production and mixed the song. "Touch Down" is a dancehall and Hip-Hop song. Minaj announced the remix on December 4, 2018.

== Live performances ==
During the concert in England London and Birmingham as part of The Nicki Wrld Tour on March 14 and 17, 2019, Stylo G joined Minaj onstage to perform "Touchdown" remix.

== Track listing ==
Original version
No.	Title	Writer(s)	Producer	Length
1.	"Touch Down (Dweet)"	McDermott	The FaNaTiX	2:07

Alternate version
No.	Title	Writer(s)	Producer	Length
1.	"Touch Down Remix" (featuring Nicki Minaj and Vybz Kartel)	The FaNaTiX; Palmer; Onika Maraj	The FaNaTiX	3:15
