= Majesty (song) =

Song by Nicki Minaj and Labrinth featuring Eminem

from the album Queen
- Released: August 10, 2018
- Studio: Criteria Studios (Miami, Florida); Effigy Studios (Detroit, Michigan); Jungle City Studios (New York)
- Genre: Melodic rap
- Length: 4:55
- Label: Young Money; Cash Money
- Songwriters: Onika Maraj; Timothy McKenzie; Marshall Mathers; Luis Resto
- Producers: Labrinth; Eminem

"Majesty" is a song by rapper Nicki Minaj and recording artist Labrinth, featuring fellow rapper Eminem. It was released on August 10, 2018 as a track on Minaj's fourth studio album Queen (2018), through Young Money Entertainment and Cash Money Records. The song was written by the artists themselves, alongside Luis Resto, and produced by Labrinth and Eminem. It was recorded at Criteria Studios, based in Miami, Florida, Effigy Studios, based in Detroit, Michigan, and Jungle City Studios, based in New York. The track is a hip hop and melodic rap record that lyrically revolves around Minaj's desire for money and success.

Upon the release of Queen, the song received mixed reviews from music critics. Commercially, the song peaked at number 58 on the US Billboard Hot 100, and entered charts in Australia, Canada, New Zealand, Sweden, Switzerland, and the United Kingdom. It was additionally certified Gold in both Australia and Brazil. It was promoted with live performances at both the 2018 MTV Video Music Awards and The Nicki Wrld Tour. "Majesty" was also featured in a Beats By Dr. Dre commercial starring Minaj herself, alongside fellow rapper Nas, and Serena Williams.

== Background and release ==
On August 10, 2018, Minaj revealed the final tracklist for her fourth studio album, Queen, that included a song titled "Majesty" featuring Eminem and Labrinth as track number two. The song marks the second time Minaj and Eminem have collaborated on a track, after "Roman's Revenge" from Minaj's debut studio album Pink Friday (2010). It was released a few hours later as part of the album on all major music platforms.

To promote it, as well as the 18 other tracks from the album, Minaj first played the song live on her Beats 1 Queen Radio show with Zane Lowe, and claimed that Eminem's verse would "go down in history as one of the best verses in the history of rap." The song was planned to be sent to rhythmic contemporary radio stations on October 16 as the fourth single from the album, however, these plans were ultimately canceled.

== Composition and lyrics ==
"Majesty" is a hip hop song that "sinks under dated piano chords, melodramatic string swells and a grating vocal hook." Minaj's recording engineer Big Juice explained the making of the song saying, "When we heard the piano part, we were like, 'oh, that's a pretty cool beat.' Once it dropped into the [sings more aggressive part], everybody went crazy. But I didn't know she was putting Eminem on it until the last couple of weeks when he sent it back. He's still one of those guys who pays attention to lyricism, and as you can tell on this song, he went in. When that beat drops, that is crazy. Then it changes again in the outro with that Caribbean vibe."

Talking about Eminem's inclusion in the song to DJ Whoo Kid's The Whoolywood Shuffle, Minaj said: "We sent him 'Majesty' not thinking he was gonna do it. He co-produced it, [...] he did the same thing with 'Roman's Revenge' [...] but he added more production value on this one like he just goes in, he tailor-makes the beat around his flow and, you know, it's epic. Can we acknowledge that [Eminem's verse is] like one of the best rap verses we've heard in years? Like oh my god, like I was so freaking stunned when I got that back. I just sat there for a long time, I couldn't move, I couldn't do nothing, I was just like, 'yo, he murdered'. It was like another level because lately you don't see rappers doing that because they don't feel like they have to anymore."

Lyrically, Minaj raps about her desire for money and success, and defends her legacy from alleged pretenders: "Can't post on Nicki block unless you sellin' Nicki crack," she raps. She uses word play in the two-liners "The MAC movin' like crack/I'm selling powder now," which is a double entendre that references her MAC Cosmetics collection and drug dealing. Towards the end of the song, she addresses in a 40 seconds outro those who are jealous of her, singing in a gently menacing coda: "Jealousy is a disease, die slow." Labrinth also pays tribute to Minaj's status as he sings on the chorus, "Whatever you say, Mrs. Majesty/Whatever you want, you can have from me."

Eminem uses a singsong flow, before turning up for a fast long-form verse—a formula that he is using since 2009's Relapse. He calls out trendy mumble rap saying, "Our genre's lymph nodes are swollen up," before abandoning the song's framework to breathlessly rap about his difficult past, and how it would be a bad idea to talk about them at all, "Let me keep it one hundred, two things shouldn't be your themes of discussion/The Queen and her husband, last thing you're gonna be is our subjects," he states. He name-checks American rappers Slick Rick and Q-Tip, and American hip hop collective Souls of Mischief, implicitly placing himself and Minaj in that same lineage.

According to a set of calculations done by a Genius contributor and confirmed by the website, Eminem's verse on the song out-performs his 2013 song "Rap God" in rapping speed by about 9.7 syllables per second. On "Majesty", Eminem raps 123 syllables in about 12 seconds—about 10.3 syllables per second—, while he spits 157 syllables in 16.3 seconds—9.6 syllables per second— on the speediest part of "Rap God". However, the latter track does still hold the Guinness World Record for most words in a single with 1,560. This record was later surpassed by Eminem again on his 2020 track "Godzilla" featuring American rapper Juice Wrld, rapping 10.65 syllables per second during his third verse.

== Critical reception ==
"Majesty" divided music critics. In a positive review, Stephanie Smith-Strickland of Entertainment Weekly called the song "a swaggering, boastful affair," and found that "The track's high-energy nature spurs the duo to go bar-for-bar with the same intensity of their last collaborative song 'Roman's Revenge'." She also praised Minaj's use of word play in the song. In Refinery29, Courtney Smith described "Majesty" as an "almost Queen-esque track," and pointed Minaj's "die slow" line towards the end of the song, which she felt were "heavy-handed." The Atlantic's Spencer Kornhaber found that "Majesty" is "a clunky show of force that leans hard on Eminem," and praised the outro stating that "It's one of a few times on Queen where the catchiest or most intriguing bits—the ones where she seems un-miffed and ready to riff— are relegated to interludes." Similarly, Rawiya Kameir from The Fader writes, "As usual, Nicki's best moments come through when she's experimenting, when it sounds like she's not overthinking things. [...] Towards the end of "Majesty", [she delivers a gently menacing lilt that is] for more inventive than much of the rest of the album."

Sam Hockey-Smith from Vulture found that while the song "is not especially surprising," Minaj and Eminem "sound great together on 'Majesty'," and "have a lot of chemistry, mostly because they both enjoy modulating their voices mid-verse." The Guardian's Ben Beaumont-Thomas felt that "Perhaps [Minaj's] closest analogue is Eminem, someone else who plays with persona and sometimes lets their technical excellence do the heavy lifting rather than truly interesting lyrics." He applauded both Minaj and Eminem's verses, but was critical of Labrinth's "catchy chorus", which he found "not finessed into [Minaj's] verses." Mike Neid of Idolator summarized, "[Minaj and Eminem] established their chemistry on "Roman's Revenge", but ["Majesty"] is another strong offering (barring some questionable lines)."

In a negative review, Ella Jukwey of The Independent wrote that "'Majesty' fails to live up the imposing title of the album. [...] On paper, [it] should be a thrilling collaboration but in fact, it is one of the few misses of the album, running for too long and lacking a cohesiveness between its three artists." In USA Today, Maeve McDermott stated that "'Majesty' isn't necessarily a bad song, but its jauntily folksy chorus and confounding Eminem verse raise more questions than answers—mainly, why does this sound like Twenty One Pilots?" She also pointed the "classic mistake of conflating rapping that is fast with rapping that is good." Forbes' Bryan Rolli advanced that "[Minaj's] lyrical ability can't salvage a track when [she] cedes it to her collaborators," criticizing Eminem's recent rap formula which is "scoring [him] pop hits but sacrificing his artistry along the way." He concluded that "'Majesty' is doomed to be mediocre at best, but Minaj could've slashed Eminem's verse altogether and made a more serviceable track at half the length." Jonny Coleman of The Hollywood Reporter added the song to the list of the album's filler tracks, writing, "[The song] could have easily hit the cutting room floor. [...] Labrinth does a poor André 3000 impression while Eminem's lyrics, production and general inclusion feel completely misplaced."

== Live performances ==
Minaj first performed the song on August 20, 2018, in a medley of "Majesty", "Barbie Dreams", "Ganja Burn", and "FEFE" live from the PATH World Trade Center station at the 2018 MTV Video Music Awards. Minaj also had frequently performed "Majesty" as her opening song on The Nicki Wrld Tour.

== In the media ==
"Majesty" was featured in a Beats by Dre commercial ad released on August 27, 2018. Titled Queen of Queens, it co-stars American tennis player Serena Williams, American rapper Nas, and Minaj. It starts out with Nas saying "In Fair Queens a complex sits. Between two sides, our hero split," before Williams comes into the picture on a stoop in New York City and the song plays in the background. Williams eventually works her way to the middle of the street where she's crowned "Queen." Minaj ends the spot by saying "Now watch the Queen conquer."

== Credits and personnel ==
Credits and personnel adapted from Queen album liner notes.

Recording

- Recorded at Criteria Studios, Miami, Florida; Effigy Studios, Detroit, Michigan; and Jungle City Studios, New York
- Mixed at Effigy Studios, Detroit, Michigan
- Mastered at Brian Gardner Mastering

Management

- Labrinth appears courtesy of Syco Music
- Eminem appears courtesy of Aftermath Records, a division of Universal Music Group

Personnel

- Nicki Minaj – vocals
- Eminem – vocals, additional production, mixing
- Labrinth – vocals, production, record engineering
- Aubry "Big Juice" Delaine – record engineering
- Mike Strange – record engineering, mixing
- Joe Strange – record engineering
- Nick Valentin – record engineering assistance
- Alex Estevez – record engineering assistance
- Luis Resto – additional keyboards
- Brian "Big Bass" Gardner – mastering

== Charts ==
Chart (2018)	Peak position
Australia (ARIA)	60
Canada Hot 100 (Billboard)	44
New Zealand Hot Singles (RMNZ)	6
Sweden Heatseeker (Sverigetopplistan)	10
Switzerland (Schweizer Hitparade)	56
UK Singles (OCC)	41
US Billboard Hot 100	58
US Hot R&B/Hip-Hop Songs (Billboard)	25

== Certifications ==
Region	Certification	Certified units/sales
Australia (ARIA)	Gold	35,000^{‡}
Brazil (Pro-Música Brasil)	Gold	20,000^{‡}
^{‡} Sales+streaming figures based on certification alone.

== Release history ==
Region	Date	Format	Label	Ref.
Various	August 10, 2018	Digital download; streaming	Young Money; Cash Money	
United States	October 16, 2018	Rhythmic contemporary radio	Young Money; Cash Money	
