= Rich Sex =

Promotional single by Nicki Minaj featuring Lil Wayne

from the album Queen
- Released: June 11, 2018
- Studio: Criteria Studios (Miami, FL)
- Genre: Dirty rap; trap
- Length: 3:12
- Label: Young Money; Cash Money
- Songwriters: Onika Maraj; Dwayne Carter; Aubry "Big Juice" Delaine; Jawara Headley; Jeremy Reid
- Producers: Big Juice; J. Reid

Nicki Minaj chronology
"Yasss Bish" (2014)	"Rich Sex" (2018)	"Fendi" (2019)

"Rich Sex" is a song by rapper Nicki Minaj featuring Lil Wayne. It was released as the first promotional single from Minaj's fourth album Queen (2018) on June 11, 2018, by Young Money Entertainment and Cash Money Records.

== Release ==
Minaj released "Rich Sex" as the first promotional single on June 11 along with the announcement of her upcoming second single "Bed" featuring American singer Ariana Grande.

== Live performances ==
Minaj first performed the song in a medley consisting of "Chun-Li" and "Rich Sex" at the BET Awards 2018 held on June 23.

== Lawsuit ==
In January 2021, rapper and co-writer of the song Jawara Headley sued Minaj for more than $200 million over the track. Headley, professionally known as Brinx Billions, claimed he should be credited as the sole author, composer, writer and producer of "Rich Sex". In his legal filings, the writer alleged he first showed Minaj "Rich Sex" prior to 2016, when she said to him "it would be extremely marketable and become a global hit".

== Credits and personnel ==
Credits adapted from Tidal.

- Nicki Minaj – lead vocals
- Lil Wayne – vocals
- J. Reid – songwriting, production
- Aubry "Big Juice" Delaine – songwriting, production, mixing engineering
- Jawara Headley – songwriting
- Jaycen Joshua – mixing
- Manny Galvez – mixing engineering
- Jeff Edwards – mixing engineering
- Rashawn Mclean – assistant mixing
- Mike Seaberg – assistant mixing
- Jacob Richards – assistant mixing
- Jason Delattiboudere – assistant engineering
- Brian Judd – assistant engineering
- Jamal Berry – assistant engineering

== Charts ==
Chart (2018)	Peak position
Canada Hot 100 (Billboard)	86
Hungary (Single Top 40)	28
Scottish Singles Sales (Official Charts)	66
US Billboard Hot 100	56
US Hot R&B/Hip-Hop Songs (Billboard)	24

== Certifications ==
Region	Certification	Certified units/sales
Australia (ARIA)	Gold	35,000^{‡}
^{‡} Sales+streaming figures based on certification alone.

== Release history ==
Region	Date	Format	Label	Ref.
Various	June 11, 2018	Digital download; streaming	Young Money, Cash Money	
