= Just Playing (Dreams) =

Promotional single by The Notorious B.I.G.

from the album Ready to Die
- Released: September 13, 1994
- Recorded: 1994
- Genre: East Coast hip hop
- Length: 2:42
- Label: Bad Boy; Arista
- Songwriters: Christopher Wallace; Rashad Smith
- Producer: Rashad Smith

Just Playing (Dreams) is a promotional single by American hip hop artist The Notorious B.I.G. for his 1994 debut album Ready to Die. It was produced by Rashad Smith, and contains a sample of James Brown's "Blues and Pants" from Hot Pants. Complex magazine ranked the song number two on its list of "The 50 Funniest Rap Songs".

Although the song does not appear on the original version of Ready to Die, it appears on the 2004 remastered version.

== Background ==
Some of the lyrics initially appeared on Mary J. Blige's "What's the 411?" remix. The song was released as a promotional single for Biggie's debut album Ready to Die.

== Composition ==
"Just Playing (Dreams)" was written by The Notorious B.I.G. and Rashad "Ringo" Smith. The song is built on a sample of "Blues and Pants" written by James Brown, and its production was done by Ringo.

In the song, Biggie takes aim at 20 of his favorite R&B singers and lists what he'd like to do to them. The list includes female R&B singers Mary J. Blige, Patti LaBelle, Mariah Carey, Chaka Khan, and Sade, who was not offended by the song. However, Raven-Symoné was 8 years old when Biggie rapped the line, "make Raven-Symoné call date rape".

The R&B quartet Xscape did not appreciate the song, which described them as "those ugly-ass Xscape bitches". In a 2009 interview, group member Kandi Burruss said that her bandmate Tameka "Tiny" Cottle ran into Biggie on the evening of his death, and he apologized for the lyric.

== Cover versions and remixes ==
- In 1996, Lil Kim's song "Dreams" sampled the lyrics of "Just Playing" on her debut studio album Hard Core.
- In 1996, Mad Skillz, sampled the line “Everybody, move ya body” as the chorus of his song "Move Ya Body" on his debut album From Where???
- In 2015, rapper Young M.A dropped her "Dreams Freestyle" from her debut 13-track mixtape Sleep Walkin.
- In 2018, rapper Nicki Minaj sampled the song for her studio album Queen in the song "Barbie Dreams". The single reached number 18 on the Billboard Hot 100 and number 36 on the UK Singles Chart.
