= Good Form (song) =

- Cover of remix featuring Lil Wayne

Single by Nicki Minaj

from the album Queen
- Released: August 10, 2018
- Recorded: January 14, 2018
- Studio: Germano Studios (New York City); Criteria Studios (Miami, Florida)
- Genre: Bounce; trap; hip hop
- Length: 3:57
- Label: Young Money; Cash Money; Republic
- Songwriters: Onika Maraj; Michael Williams; Asheton Hogan; Dwayne Carter (single version only)
- Producers: Mike Will Made It; Pluss

Nicki Minaj singles chronology
"No Candle No Light" (2018)	"Good Form" (2018)	"Touch Down (Remix)" (2018)

Lil Wayne singles chronology
"Uproar" (2018)	"Good Form" (2018)	"Don’t Cry" (2019)

Music video
- "Good Form" (feat. Lil Wayne) on YouTube

"Good Form" is a song by rapper Nicki Minaj. The original mix debuted on the US Billboard Bubbling Under Hot 100 singles chart at number nine following the release of her fourth album, Queen, on August 10, 2018. A remix to the song featuring American rapper Lil Wayne was released on November 29, 2018, as the fourth single from the album; it peaked at number 60 on the Billboard Hot 100. It was written by Minaj and was produced by Mike Will Made It and Pluss.

== Background ==
"Good Form" originally appeared on March 29, 2018, in a Mercedes-Benz commercial starring Minaj. Instrumentals from the song could be heard at one point during the advertisement. The song was included as a track on Minaj's album Queen, released on August 10, 2018.

== Music video ==
A music video for the remix song was released on November 29, 2018, coincident with the song. Directed by Colin Tilley, it stars Minaj and Wayne along with reality star Evelyn Lozada, actress Lauren London, the Clermont twins, and rappers Tyga, Gudda Gudda, and Marley G. Charles Holmes of Rolling Stone described the video as "a full-length monument to twerking, and a sensual overload", as well as "an Oscar contender of a music video". In France, the music video was broadcast with warning "Not advised for kids under 10 years old" during the day with blurring, then after 10pm the night "Not advised for kids under 12 years" with or without blurring, following the sexual content, vulgar, obscenes images and erotic scenes in the video.

== Reception ==
Briana Younger of Pitchfork commented about the song: "the twerk-ready 'Good Form' showcase the rapper’s inimitable technique... Little tricks, like her play on the phonetics of 'good form,' which she alternates to sound like 'good for him,' are the kind of flourishes that set her apart", Maeve McDermott from USA Today was positive towards the song; she stated, "[the song] is peak Nicki bravado – chest puffing and explicit – and a fitting counterpart to 'LLC,' as a pair of tracks with the stinging lyricism and bratty flows at which Minaj excels." Israel Daramola of Spin listed the song as being a standout track from the album. In HipHopDX, Trent Clark called it a "fraternal filler."

== Live performances ==
Minaj performed the song live on November 4, 2018, in a medley, which featured "Woman Like Me" by British girlband Little Mix at the 2018 MTV Europe Music Awards. She performed the single again, along with "Dip" with American rapper Tyga at the 44th People's Choice Awards. Minaj also performed the song as part of her setlist on The Nicki Wrld Tour, during her shows in London and Birmingham.

== Chart performance ==
For the week of December 8, 2018, the remix reached number 16 on the Billboard R&B/Hip Hop Digital Song Sales chart. For the issue dated December 15, 2018, the song entered the US Billboard Hot 100 at number 60. It charted for a total of six weeks.

== Credits and personnel ==
Credits adapted from Queen album liner notes and Tidal.

Recording

- Recorded at Germano Studios, New York City, and Criteria Studios, Miami, Florida
- Mixed at Larrabee Sound Studios, North Hollywood, California
- Mastered at Chris Athens Masters, Austin, Texas

Personnel

- Nicki Minaj – main artist
- Lil Wayne – featured artist
- Mike Will Made It – production
- Pluss – production
- Aubry "Big Juice" Delaine – record engineering
- Manny Galvez – record engineering
- Matthew Sim – record engineering assistance
- Jason Staniulis – record engineering assistance
- Kenta Yonesaka – record engineering assistance
- Nick Valentin – record engineering assistance
- Jaycen Joshua – mixing
- David Nakaji – mixing assistance
- Ben Milchev – mixing assistance
- Chris Athens – mastering

== Charts ==
Original mix

Chart (2018)	Peak position
Ireland (IRMA)	96
UK Single Charts	90
US Bubbling Under Hot 100 Singles (Billboard)	9

Remix

Chart (2018–2019)	Peak position
Canada Hot 100 (Billboard)	46
New Zealand Hot Singles (RMNZ)	28
US Billboard Hot 100	60
US Hot R&B/Hip-Hop Songs (Billboard)	29
US Rhythmic Airplay (Billboard)	23

== Certifications ==
Certifications for "Good Form"
Region	Certification	Certified units/sales
Australia (ARIA) for remix featuring Lil Wayne	Platinum	70,000^{‡}
Brazil (Pro-Música Brasil)	Platinum	40,000^{‡}
New Zealand (RMNZ)	Gold	15,000^{‡}
United Kingdom (BPI)	Silver	200,000^{‡}
^{‡} Sales+streaming figures based on certification alone.

== Release history ==
Region	Date	Format	Label(s)	Ref.
Worldwide	August 10, 2018 (Original Version)	Digital download; streaming	Young Money; Cash Money; Republic	
Worldwide	November 29, 2018	Digital download; streaming	Young Money; Cash Money; Republic	
United States	December 4, 2018	Rhythmic contemporary	Young Money; Cash Money; Republic	
