= Yasss Bish =

2014 song performed by Nicki Minaj

Promotional single by Nicki Minaj featuring Soulja Boy
- Released: May 19, 2014
- Recorded: 2014
- Genre: Drill
- Length: 4:11
- Label: Young Money; Cash Money; Universal Republic
- Songwriter: Onika Tanya Maraj
- Producers: Soulja Boy & Joseph DaVinci

Nicki Minaj chronology
"Yasss Bish" (2014)	"Rich Sex" (2018)

"Yasss Bish" is a song recorded by rapper Nicki Minaj for her third studio album The Pinkprint (2014), which did not make the final cut. It was written by Minaj along with the song's producers, Joseph DaVinci & Soulja Boy, who is also credited as a guest vocalist. The track was released through her official SoundCloud account as the album's third promotional single on May 3, 2014, following "Lookin Ass" and "Chi-Raq".

Musically, "Yasss Bish" is a drill song with a trap beat. Its stripped back hip hop production encompasses intense Roland TR-808 drum hits, a "sinister, echo-y" vocal loop, "eerie" shimmering synthesizers, foreboding snares, and the sound of church bells ringing in an ominous tone. Lyrically, Minaj addresses her detractors, and references several celebrities including Donald Sterling and Will and Jada Smith.

Minaj performed the song live for the first time along with Soulja Boy on May 18, 2014, at the Power 106's Powerhouse, Minaj performed the song again on June 2 at Hot 97 Summer Jam 2014.

== Background ==
In September 2013, Minaj began working on her third studio album, The Pinkprint (2014). For the album, Minaj desired to return to her hip-hop roots, calling the album's sound "a continuation of The Re-Up with a lot more". Minaj told MTV News that the sound of The Pinkprint would be "next level" and will have "so much to talk about", saying: "I'm really excited and the people that have been working with me now, have been people that I haven't worked with before so it's like they're bringing a new sound to the album that I've never experimented with."

In April 2014, Minaj posted a picture on Instagram of herself with Soulja Boy in a studio. Later that month, he posted a Vine of him singing the song's chorus. Originally, Joseph DaVinci & Soulja Boy created the song's beat but according to him, it lacked a hook. However, he later came up with the idea for the hook while making a Vine, and added it into the song. He then brought the unfinished version of "Yasss Bish" to Minaj, who was impressed by the song and recorded her vocals. After Minaj sent the track back to him, it took "about a day" for Soulja Boy to finish mixing the record. In May 2014, Minaj spoke of the meaning behind the word "yasss": "When I watch 'RuPaul's Drag Race,' I live for the way they speak. Females, we adopted it and it makes us feel like very cocky and very just like sexy and feminine. So saying 'yass' as opposed to 'yes,' it's just putting on a billion times more attitude to the word 'yes'." On May 3, 2014, Minaj posted the song on her official SoundCloud shortly after midnight.

== Composition ==
Musically, "Yasss Bish" has been described as a "bouncy drill anthem" with a trap beat. It features a stripped back hip hop production that encompasses intense Roland TR-808 drum hits, a "sinister, echo-y" vocal loop, "eerie" shimmering synthesizers, foreboding snares, and the sound of church bells ringing in an ominous tone. Minaj's vocals in "Yasss Bish" have been described as "melodic" with a "fierce" message, while her rapping has been compared to the works of Southern hip hop group Migos. Several critics including Kyle Harvey of The Grio and Emma Goddard of Bustle noted the change in sound to be the beginning of a new image for Minaj. Harvey said the song continued her goal of shedding her image of a pop act, while Goddard said: "Although this song is definitely NSFW and it's completely improbable that we'll hear British sisters Sophia Grace and Rosie rapping her song anytime soon, Minaj has come back strong with a new image."

Lyrically, she addresses her detractors and all those who don't believe in her. The song opens with Soulja Boy singing "yasss bish" repeatedly for thirty seconds before Minaj begins her rap with "Me I'm just me/Me I'm just real/Me I'm that bitch that be footing the bill." In the line "I don't fuck with you niggas/I own the Clippers/I own some homes/I own my own liquor" Minaj references ex-Clippers owner Donald Sterling, who was banned from the NBA after leaked recordings of him making racist comments were made public. She also mentions Will and Jada Smith in the lyrics: "Bitches can't beat me they ain't got the skill/Eye of the tiger they ain't got the kill/Look up to Jada/I love her and Will."

== Critical reception ==
Upon release, "Yasss Bish" received positive reviews from music critics. Lewis Corner of Digital Spy named "Yasss Bish" one of the "10 tracks you need to hear", praising Minaj's vocal delivery, the inclusion of Soulja Boy, and the line "Fix it, Jesus." Colin Joyce of Spin called the song an "unbridled joy", and noted that while it may not be included on The Pink Print, the album would be "lucky, however, to feature any track half as exuberant as this one." A writer for MTV News UK praised both the production and vocals on "Yasss Bish", saying that Minaj's "melodic" vocals and "fierce" rap delivery were the best part of the song. Several critics noted a musical departure from the pop and dance-pop stylings of her second studio album Pink Friday: Roman Reloaded (2012). MTV News writer Emilee Lindner said "Yasss Bish" found Minaj going back to her original sound, saying: "Nicki Minaj is letting her rapping speak for itself. She's left her colorful wigs, fancy robes and tutus behind — along with the hyper-pop production of some of her biggest hits — and now she's getting back to her roots." Emma Goddard of Bustle praised the chemistry between the two rappers and saw the song as a change from the more upbeat sound found in Minaj's catalogue, which she credited with "show[ing] her rapping prowess much more". Writing for The Source, Khari said of "Yasss Bish": "[Minaj] sheds the wig and the excessive make-up, we get the most gorgeous Nicki we've seen in her career. Now, she grabs Soulja Boy & Joseph DaVinci for the hook and the beat. You guessed it, score again."

== Release history ==
Region	Date	Format	Label
United Kingdom	May 19, 2014	Contemporary hit radio	Universal Republic
