= Queen (Nicki Minaj album) =

2018 studio album by Nicki Minaj

Studio album by Nicki Minaj
- Released: August 10, 2018
- Recorded: 2016–2018
- Studios: Criteria (Miami); Effigy (Detroit); La Grande Armée (Paris); Glenwood Place (Burbank); Kingdom (Beverly Hills); SremmLife (Los Angeles); Jungle City (New York City); Germano (New York City); Premier (New York City)
- Genre: Hip-hop
- Length: 66:19
- Labels: Young Money; Cash Money; Republic
- Producers: Beats Bailey; Ben Billions; Domenic Garofalo; Boi-1da; Ashley "Blank" Bannister; Chris Braide; Cirkut; Cubeatz; DJ Wes; Frank Dukes; Illmind; Invincible; J Beatzz; JFK; J Gramm; JMIKE; J. Reid; June Nawakii; Kane Beatz; Labrinth; Mel & Mus; Messy; Metro Boomin; Mike Will Made It; Murda Beatz; Pluss; Rashad Smith; Rex Kudo; Sevn Thomas; Supa Dups; Zaytoven

Nicki Minaj chronology
The Pinkprint (2014)	Queen (2018)	Queen Radio: Volume 1 (2022)

Singles from Queen
- 1. "Chun-Li" Released: April 12, 2018; 2. "Bed" Released: June 14, 2018; 3. "Barbie Dreams" Released: August 14, 2018; 4. "Good Form" Released: November 29, 2018

Queen is the fourth studio album by rapper Nicki Minaj. It was released on August 10, 2018, by Young Money Entertainment, Cash Money Records, and Republic Records. Recording sessions with a handful of producers for the album began in late 2016 and concluded in August 2018. The album includes guest appearances by rappers Eminem, Foxy Brown, Future, Swae Lee, and Lil Wayne, along with singers Ariana Grande, Labrinth, and the Weeknd.

Queen's release date was pushed back twice before ultimately being released a week ahead of schedule. The album was supported by four singles: "Chun-Li", "Bed" featuring Ariana Grande, "Barbie Dreams" and a remix of "Good Form" featuring Lil Wayne. "Fefe" with 6ix9ine and Murda Beatz was added to streaming editions of the album in the week following its release; both "Chun-Li" and "Fefe" peaked within the top ten of the US Billboard Hot 100. To promote the album, Minaj launched her live radio program, Queen Radio (which aired on Beats 1), and eventually embarked on The Nicki Wrld Tour with Juice Wrld in February 2019.

Queen received generally positive reviews from music critics upon its release, who complimented the album's production but criticized its length and lack of direction. The album debuted at number two on the US Billboard 200 with 185,000 album-equivalent units, of which 78,000 came from pure album sales. It charted within the top ten in other countries, including Australia, Canada, Netherlands, Ireland, New Zealand, Norway, Switzerland, and the United Kingdom. The album was certified platinum by the Recording Industry Association of America (RIAA) in January 2019.

== Background and development ==
In an October 2016 interview, following the release of her third studio album, The Pinkprint (2014), and the completion of The Pinkprint Tour in August 2015, Minaj was asked for details on her upcoming fourth album, responding, "The album is so freaking epic, but it's a journey, right? Before my first album came out, I was on everybody's song; I had my own campaign without realizing it. Right now, I have to complete a few things for other people." During subsequent interviews, Minaj claimed her fourth studio album would be her "best body of work" and "a classic hip-hop album that people will never forget", as well as signifying an era of her career "a billion times more epic than anything 'Anaconda' could have delivered."

In October 2017, Minaj told T Magazine about her vision for the album, stating, "Sonically, I know what the album's about to sound like; I know what this album is gonna mean to my fans. This album is everything in my life coming full-circle. [...] Now, I can tell you guys what happened for the last two years of my life. I know who I am. I am getting Nicki Minaj figured-out with this album and I'm loving her."

== Music and lyrics ==
Queen is a hip hop album with elements of trap, dancehall, reggae, pop, and R&B. The opening track "Ganja Burn" is a reggae-inspired island-pop song, in which Minaj defends her position in the music industry. The following track "Majesty", with Labrinth featuring Eminem, is a pop-rap song that "sinks under dated piano chords, melodramatic string swells and a grating vocal hook." The third track, "Barbie Dreams", samples the Notorious B.I.G.'s 1994 song "Just Playing (Dreams)". While the Notorious B.I.G. rapped about his sexual desire for popular R&B singers, Minaj roasts male artists, including Drake, ex-boyfriend Meek Mill, Eminem, DJ Khaled, 50 Cent, Young Thug, Swae Lee, Lil Uzi Vert, Fetty Wap, Quavo, Desiigner, Future, and YG. Minaj clarified that the track only targets individuals she loves, and claimed it is not a diss track.

"Rich Sex", featuring Lil Wayne, is a trap song, in contrast to the R&B song "Thought I Knew You" which "sports some of Queen's lushest production". In the song, the Weeknd, a featured artist on the track, contributes to the lament over estranged lovers with Weeknd's "buttery tenor serving as the perfect counterpoint to [Minaj's] clipped, Auto-Tuned raps and distorted vocals." Swae Lee, of hip-hop duo Rae Sremmurd, is also featured on the album. Brendan Klinkenberg of Rolling Stone opines that Lee steals the spotlight on this track with his "delicate falsetto" with Minaj "deploying clearly demarcated, darting verses." Minaj named their song "Chun Swae" after her collaborator. At the end of this track, Minaj boasts to her listeners "You're in the middle of Queen right now, thinking/I see why she called this shit Queen/This bitch is really the fucking queen—ahh!" before bursting into a maniacal laugh.

The album's lead single, "Chun-Li" then follows. Variety described "Come See About Me" as "a soft, sculpted ballad that allows Minaj's rap-singing romanticism to nestle in a richly opulent setting." Foxy Brown is featured in the track "Coco Chanel". Andree Gee from Uproxx asserted that their collaboration in the "swaggering" track remained "true to both rapper's Trini roots, with dancehall inspired drums fused over ominous keys." The song continues into the closing track "Inspirations Outro".

== Release and promotion ==
On May 7, 2018, during an interview at the Met Gala, Minaj announced the album's title and original release date, which was then delayed. It was initially scheduled for a June 15 release, but was later pushed back to August 10, and then to August 17, before ultimately being released a week ahead of schedule.

To accompany the album's release, Minaj launched her own radio show titled Queen Radio, which aired on Beats 1. The radio show started August 9, 2018, and the most recent show aired on February 10, 2020. The show featured celebrity guest appearances by Ariana Grande, Alicia Keys, Winnie Harlow, Kim Kardashian, Kelly Rowland, Swae Lee, Little Mix, Lil Wayne, Nene Leakes, Normani, Kandi Burruss, Lauren London, Kehlani, Tyga, Trina, Asian Doll, Cassie, Soulja Boy, Blac Chyna, Big Fendi, Joe Budden and Ts Madison. The show usually began with Minaj reading fans' tweets. Throughout the show, Minaj played a mixture of songs from her own playlist as well as some tracks from the album. Additionally, Minaj gave advice to callers about their sex lives.

Minaj made several television appearances and live performances in support of the album. On May 13, 2018, Minaj performed "Chun-Li" live during Future's set at Rolling Loud Festival in Miami. She also performed the song during her Saturday Night Live season finale appearance on May 19, 2018. On June 23, 2018, she performed a medley of "Chun-Li" and "Rich Sex" at the BET Awards. On August 13, 2018, she appeared as a guest on The Late Show, and freestyled a personalized verse from "Barbie Dreams" dedicated to Stephen Colbert. On August 20, 2018, she performed a medley of "Majesty", "Barbie Dreams", "Ganja Burn", and "Fefe" live from the PATH World Trade Center station at the 2018 MTV Video Music Awards. On November 4, 2018, Minaj performed her song "Good Form" and "Woman Like Me" with Little Mix in Spain at the 2018 MTV Europe Music Awards. On November 11, 2018, Minaj performed "Good Form" and "Dip" with Tyga at the 44th People's Choice Awards where Queen won the fan-voted award for the Album of 2018.

Merchandise and tour bundles were sold with the album. Further promotion included a co-headlining NickiHndrxx Tour with American rapper Future. However, it was announced on December 21, 2018, that Future was no longer part of the tour and Minaj would tour with late American rapper Juice Wrld instead; The Nicki Wrld Tour commenced in February 2019 in Europe.

=== Artwork and packaging ===
On June 7, 2018, Minaj released the cover art for the album on Twitter, shot by Mert and Marcus during the "Ganja Burn" music video shoot, which featured Minaj topless, sitting on a log. She wears pasties and a head-dress inspired by the ancient Egyptian queen Cleopatra.

== Singles ==
"Chun-Li" was released on April 12, 2018, as the first single alongside "Barbie Tingz". As the lead single from the album, a vertical music video was released on April 13, while the official video, directed by Steven Klein, was uploaded onto Minaj's YouTube and Vevo accounts on May 4. It peaked at number ten on the US Billboard Hot 100 and number six on the Hot R&B/Hip-Hop Songs chart; and was certified platinum by the Recording Industry Association of America (RIAA). "Barbie Tingz" appears on the Target Exclusive edition of the album and as a bonus track in Japan. Its music video, directed by Giovanni Bianco, was uploaded to Minaj's YouTube and Vevo accounts on May 4. The song peaked at number 25 on the Billboard Hot 100 and number 17 on the Hot R&B/Hip-Hop Songs chart, and was certified gold by the Recording Industry Association of America.

"Bed", featuring American singer Ariana Grande, was released as the album's second single on June 14 along with the album pre-order, and was later serviced to contemporary hit radio and rhythmic contemporary radio in the United States on June 19. Its music video, directed by Hype Williams, premiered on July 6 on Minaj's YouTube and Vevo accounts. The song peaked at number 42 on the Billboard Hot 100 and number 19 on the Hot R&B/Hip-Hop Songs chart and was certified gold by the RIAA.

"Barbie Dreams" was released as the album's third single and serviced to rhythmic contemporary radio in the United States on August 14. The music video for the song was released on September 11 and was directed by Hype Williams. It peaked at number 18 on the Billboard Hot 100 and number 13 on the Hot R&B/Hip-Hop Songs chart and was certified gold by the RIAA. "Majesty", featuring Eminem and Labrinth, and "Good Form" were scheduled to be serviced to radio as singles on October 16 and November 13, respectively. Only the latter was released, with a remix featuring American rapper Lil Wayne, being serviced as the album's fourth single with an accompanying music video, directed by Colin Tilley, on November 29. It peaked at number 60 on the Billboard Hot 100 and number 29 on the Hot R&B/Hip-Hop songs chart.

=== Promotional singles ===
"Rich Sex" featuring American rapper Lil Wayne was released on June 11, 2018, as a promotional single from the album. It peaked at number 56 on the Billboard Hot 100 and number 24 on the Hot R&B/Hip-Hop Songs chart.

=== Other songs ===
"Ganja Burn", the opening track of the album, was supported by a music video directed by Mert and Marcus, released on August 13. The song peaked at number 60 on the Billboard Hot 100 and number 27 on the Hot R&B/Hip-Hop Songs chart. "Hard White" was also supported by a music video released on February 1, 2019. Minaj announced the release of the video a day earlier on Instagram along with the announcement of her Queen Fragrance.

"Fefe" by American rapper 6ix9ine featuring Minaj and Murda Beatz was released on July 22, along with its accompanying music video, directed by TrifeDrew and William Asher. It peaked at number three on both Billboard Hot 100 and the Hot R&B/Hip-Hop Songs chart and was certified 8× Platinum by the Recording Industry Association of America. "Fefe" was added to the tracklist days after the album release as track number 20, and only appears in the standard digital edition.

== Critical reception ==
Professional ratings
Aggregate scores
Source	Rating
AnyDecentMusic?	6.5/10
Metacritic	70/100
Review scores
Source	Rating
AllMusic	3/5 stars
Entertainment Weekly	B
The Guardian	3/5 stars
HipHopDX	3.4/5
The Independent	4/5 stars
NME	3/5 stars
Pitchfork	7.6/10
Rolling Stone	3.5/5 stars
Spin	2.5/5 stars
Vice (Expert Witness)	A−

Queen was met with generally positive reviews from critics, who praised its production but derided the length of the album and the general lack of direction. At Metacritic, which assigns a normalized rating out of 100 to reviews from mainstream publications, the album received an average score of 70, based on 22 reviews.

In a positive review, Ella Jukwey of The Independent wrote that Queen is "the most important album of Minaj's career so far. It's the first time in her career that she has faced real opposition, and this latest record suggests that competition brings out the best in her. It may lack cohesion at certain points, but one thing is never in doubt: Minaj is still one of the best in her field." Reviewing for Vice, Robert Christgau said Minaj's album and Eminem's 2018 Kamikaze record are "quick-lipped, sharp-tongued arguments for the hip-hop they and I came up on and the endangered kind of flow both excel at. And both are funny, outrageous, self-confident announcements that neither artist has any intention of going away."

For Billboard, Kathy Iandoli stated that Queen "exists to exemplify Nicki's proven longevity, which is enough of a rarity to finally declare her as well-deserved rap royalty", although was critical of the album's length. Briana Younger of Pitchfork gave the album a positive review, stating "the connections between past and present, between style and form, make Queen feel like her most creatively honest album." Erin Lowers from Exclaim! gave the album a positive review, saying it highlighted the rapper's "ability to adapt to an ever-changing sonic landscape" and concluding that Minaj wasn't going anywhere anytime soon. The A.V. Club gave it a B+, stating in their review, "Musically, she avoids flavor-of-the-moment trend-hopping in favor of lusher, more broadly poppy production [...] it's a lot of fun, but not quite the instant classic for which Minaj seems to have been aiming."

In a mixed review, Bryan Rolli of Forbes concluded that Queen is "a great 10-song album hiding inside a messy 19-song album", though complimented Minaj's lyricism, and said the album "gives fans plenty to sink their teeth into." Mikael Wood of the Los Angeles Times, felt that Minaj "spends so much time describing her dominance that a clear conclusion is that she fears it's beginning to erode [...] all the back-in-my-day stuff suggests a lack of confidence in her unique perspective." For The Washington Post, Chris Richards said, "Queen only feels connected to the current rap zeitgeist in the saddest way, as another portrait of a visionary rapper in decline." Carl Anka of NME wrote, "Unfortunately, in trying to take on all comers at once, there are parts of Queen that feel like an overreach. There is a better ten track effort hiding in Queen, but you get the impression Nicki kept tracks like 'Miami' to hedge her bets in a bid for streaming success." Mosi Reeves of Rolling Stone wrote that Queen brings a new Nicki Minaj character: "the regal, haughty monarch, a woman who insists on sword-sharpened rhymes as a prerogative for excellence" but taking note of the "flabby, meandering mid-section."

In an unfavorable review, The Hollywood Reporter's Jonny Coleman deemed the album "[a] joyless mess" and summarized, "Minaj doesn't really investigate any of her issues with herself or others in any meaningful way on the new album. When all is said and done, it's just another playlist of disconnected mish-mash bangers that we'll probably forget in two weeks." The Atlantic's Spencer Kornhaber criticized the lyrical content of "Hard White", describing it as sexist and undermining Minaj's feminist position. Online hip hop publication HipHopDX criticised the album for a lack of depth and its run time, saying: "There are no deep layers to be uncovered on Queen."

=== Accolades ===
A summary of accolades by publication and rank
Publication	Accolade	Rank	Ref.
Okayplayer	The Best Albums of 2018	8	

== Commercial performance ==
In the United States, the album debuted at number two on the Billboard 200 with 185,000 album-equivalent units, of which 97,000 were came from 128.7 million streaming equivalent units, 10,000 from 100,000 track equivalent album sales (downloads & pure sales of the tracks 10 pure track sales/downloads equals 1 album sale) & finally 78,000 were from pure album sales. The album debuted behind Astroworld by American rapper Travis Scott, which was spending its second week on top. The album dropped one place to number three in its second week, earning an additional 95,000 album-equivalent units. The album dropped to the number five position on the Billboard chart in the third week, moving 64,000 equivalent units. In the fourth week, Queen slipped from the number five to seven position on the Billboard charts, moving 47,000 equivalent-units. In January 2019, Queen was certified Platinum by the Recording Industry Association of America (RIAA) for 1 million equivalent units in the US.

In Australia, Queen opened at number four on the ARIA Albums Chart, becoming Minaj's highest-charting album in the country. In Canada, the album debuted at number two on the Canadian Albums Chart, behind Scott's Astroworld. It serves as Minaj's fourth consecutive top-ten album in the country. In the United Kingdom, Queen debuted at number five on the UK Albums Chart, becoming the rapper's second top-ten album on the chart. The album also reached the top ten in other music markets, such as Ireland, the Netherlands, New Zealand, Norway, Switzerland, and Wallonia. Queen is also Minaj's highest-peaking album in France and Germany, where it debuted at number seven and eighteen, respectively.

== Track listing ==
Queen track listing
No.	Title	Writer(s)	Producer(s)	Length
1.	"Ganja Burn"	Onika Maraj; Jeremy Reid; Jairus Mozee	J. Reid	4:54
2.	"Majesty" (with Labrinth featuring Eminem)	Maraj; Timothy McKenzie; Marshall Mathers; Luis Resto	Labrinth; Eminem^{[b]}	4:55
3.	"Barbie Dreams"	Maraj; Rashad Smith; Melvin Hough II; Rivelino Raoul Wouter; Christopher Wallace; James Brown; Fred Wesley	Rashad Smith; Mel & Mus	4:39
4.	"Rich Sex" (featuring Lil Wayne)	Maraj; Dwayne Carter; Reid; Jawara Headley; Aubry Delaine	J. Reid; Big Juice^{[b]}	3:12
5.	"Hard White"	Maraj; Matthew Samuels; Ramon Ibanga Jr.; Brittany Hazzard	Boi-1da; Illmind	3:13
6.	"Bed" (featuring Ariana Grande)	Maraj; Benjamin Diehl; Gamal Lewis; Brett Bailey; Mescon David Asher; Dwayne Chin-Quee	Ben Billions; Beats Bailey; Supa Dups; Messy^{[a]}	3:09
7.	"Thought I Knew You" (featuring the Weeknd)	Maraj; Abel Tesfaye; Hazzard; Reid	J. Reid	3:18
8.	"Run & Hide"	Maraj; Hazzard; Rupert Thomas Jr.; Masamune Kudo	Sevn Thomas; Rex Kudo	2:34
9.	"Chun Swae" (featuring Swae Lee)	Maraj; Khalif Brown; Leland Wayne	Metro Boomin	6:10
10.	"Chun-Li"	Maraj; Reid	J. Reid; Nicki Minaj^{[a]}	3:11
11.	"LLC"	Maraj; Rasool Diaz; Wesley Dees; Jason Fox	SoolGotHits; DJ Wes; JFK	3:41
12.	"Good Form"	Maraj; Michael Williams II; Asheton Hogan	Mike Will Made It; Pluss	3:19
13.	"Nip Tuck"	Maraj; Hazzard; Jeremy Coleman; Daniel Johnson; June Nawakii	JMIKE; June Nawakii; Kane Beatz	3:27
14.	"2 Lit 2 Late Interlude"	Maraj; Hazzard; Julian Gramma; Adam King Feeney	J Gramm; Frank Dukes	0:55
15.	"Come See About Me"	Maraj; Hazzard; Christopher Braide; Henry Walter	Chris Braide; Cirkut	4:06
16.	"Sir" (featuring Future)	Maraj; Nayvadius Wilburn; Wayne; Xavier Dotson	Metro Boomin; Zaytoven	3:44
17.	"Miami"	Maraj; Shane Lindstrom; Diaz; Douglas Patterson	Murda Beatz; Sool^{[a]}	3:10
18.	"Coco Chanel" (featuring Foxy Brown)	Maraj; Joshua Adams; Inga Marchand; Ashley Bannister; Dillon Hart Francis; Sonny Moore	J Beatzz; Blank^{[a]}	3:44
19.	"Inspirations (Outro)"	Maraj; Adams; Bannister; Dillon; Moore	J Beatzz; Blank^{[a]}	0:58
Total length:				66:19

Revised digital edition bonus track
No.	Title	Writer(s)	Producer(s)	Length
20.	"Fefe" (6ix9ine featuring Nicki Minaj and Murda Beatz)	Daniel Hernandez; Maraj; Lindstrom; Kevin Gomringer; Tim Gomringer; Andrew Green	Murda Beatz	2:59
Total length:				70:00

Digital deluxe edition bonus track
No.	Title	Writer(s)	Producer(s)	Length
20.	"Good Form" (featuring Lil Wayne)	Maraj; Michael Williams II; Asheton Hogan; Carter	Mike Will Made It; Pluss	3:57
Total length:				70:16

Target and Japanese edition bonus tracks
No.	Title	Writer(s)	Producer(s)	Length
20.	"Barbie Tingz"	Maraj; Reid	J. Reid	3:11
21.	"Regular Degular"	Maraj; Vincent Watson; Cory Martin	Invincible; Lowkey^{[b]}	3:33
Total length:				73:14

Notes

- ^{^[a]} signifies a co-producer.
- ^{^[b]} signifies an additional producer.
- "Ganja Burn" was incorrectly titled as "Ganja Burns" upon release
- "Fefe" was added halfway through Queen's first week

Sample credits

- "Barbie Dreams" contains interpolations from "Just Playing (Dreams)", written by Christopher Wallace and Rashad Smith, as performed by The Notorious B.I.G.; samples and interpolations from "Blues & Pants", written by James Brown and Fred Wesley, as performed by Brown
- "Coco Chanel" and "Inspirations (Outro)" contain elements and samples from "Bun Up the Dance", written by Dillon Hart Francis and Sonny Moore, as performed by Dillon Francis and Skrillex

== Personnel ==
Credits adapted from Queen album liner notes.

=== Musicians ===
- Nicki Minaj – main vocals (all tracks)
- 6ix9ine – main vocals (track 20 (bonus))
- Murda Beatz – lead artist (track 20 (bonus))
- Labrinth – main vocals (track 2)
- Eminem – featured vocals (track 2)
- Lil Wayne – featured vocals (track 4, track 20 (deluxe))
- Ariana Grande – featured vocals (track 6)
- The Weeknd – featured vocals (track 7)
- Swae Lee – featured vocals (track 9)
- Future – featured vocals (track 16)
- Foxy Brown – featured vocals (track 18)
- Douglas Patterson – additional vocals (track 17)
- Jairus Mozee – guitars (track 1)
- Luis Resto – additional keyboards (track 2)
- OP! – additional programming (track 3)

=== Production ===
- Dwayne "Tha President" Carter – executive production
- Bryan "Baby Birdman" Williams – executive production
- Ronald "Slim tha Don" Williams – executive production
- Nicki Minaj – co-executive production, co-production (track 10)
- Jenny Beal – album production
- Michelle Ayabarreno – album production
- J. Reid – production (tracks 1, 4, 7, 10, and 21 (Target))
- Labrinth – production (track 2)
- Rashad "Ringo" Smith – production (track 3)
- Mel and Mus – production (track 3)
- Boi-1da – production (track 5)
- Illmind – production (track 5)
- Ben Billions – production (track 6)
- Beats Bailey – production (track 6)
- Dwayne "Supa Dups" Chin-Quee – production (track 6)
- Sevn Thomas – production (track 8)
- Rex Kudo – production (track 8)
- Metro Boomin – production (tracks 9 and 16)
- Sool – production (tracks 11 and 17)
- DJ Wes – production (track 11)
- JFK – production (track 11)
- Mike Will Made It – production (track 12)
- Pluss – production (track 12)
- JMIKE – production (track 13)
- June Nawakii – production (track 13)
- Kane Beatz – production (track 13)
- J Gramm – production (track 14)
- Frank Dukes – production (track 14)
- Christopher Braide – production (track 15)
- Henry "Cirkut" Walter – production (track 15)
- Zaytoven – production (track 16)
- Murda Beatz – production (tracks 17 and 20 (bonus))
- J Beatzz– production (tracks 18 and 19)
- Invincible – production (track 20 (Target))
- Messy – co-production (track 6)
- Ashley "Blank" Bannister – co-production (tracks 18 and 19)
- Cubeatz – co-production (track 20 (bonus))
- Lowkey – co-production (track 20 (Target))
- Eminem – additional production (track 2)
- Aubry "Big Juice" Delaine – additional production (track 4)

=== Technical ===
- Aubry "Big Juice" Delaine – record engineering (all tracks), mixing (tracks 5, 16, and 21 (Target))
- Labrinth – record engineering (tracks 1, 2, 11, and 21 (Target))
- Mike Strange – record engineering (track 2)
- Joe Strange – record engineering (track 2)
- Jeff Edwards – record engineering (track 4)
- Manny Galvez – record engineering (track 4)
- Shin Kamiyama – record engineering (track 7)
- Randy Lanphaer – record engineering (track 9)
- Swae Lee – record engineering (track 9)
- Jeremy Reid – record engineering (track 18)
- Wizard Lee Weinberg – record engineering (track 20 (bonus)), mixing (track 20 (bonus)), mastering engineering (track 20 (bonus))
- Laura Bates – record engineering assistance (tracks 1, 3, 7, 10, 11, and 21 (Target)), mixing assistance (tracks 5, 10, 16, and 21 (Target))
- Iván Jiménez – record engineering assistance (tracks 1, 10, 11, and 21 (Target)), mixing assistance (track 16)
- Brian Judd – record engineering assistance (tracks 1, 4, 7, 9, 11, 13, and 17)
- Nick Valentin – record engineering assistance (tracks 1, 2, 6, 8, 12–15, and 20 (Target))
- Alex Estevez – record engineering assistance (track 2)
- Todd Bergman – record engineering assistance (track 3)
- Jamal Berry – record engineering assistance (tracks 4 and 15)
- Jason Delattiboudere – record engineering assistance (track 4)
- Ludovick Tartavel – record engineering assistance (track 5)
- Yann Bordeo – record engineering assistance (track 5)
- Iain Findlay – record engineering assistance (tracks 5 and 16)
- Jordon Silva – record engineering assistance (tracks 5 and 16)
- William Knauft – record engineering assistance (tracks 6, 11, and 15)
- Cory Williams – record engineering assistance (tracks 9 and 14)
- Matthew Sim – record engineering assistance (tracks 12, 17, and 18)
- Jason Staniulis – record engineering assistance (tracks 12, 17–19)
- Kenta Yonesaka – record engineering assistance (tracks 12, 17, and 18)
- Shane Goodridge – record engineering assistance (tracks 18 and 19)
- Jaycen Joshua – mixing (tracks 1, 3–5, 7, 9, 11, 12, 14, 15, 17–19)
- Eminem – mixing (track 2)
- Mike Strange – mixing (track 2)
- Serban Ghenea – mixing (tracks 6 and 13)
- Jon Castelli – mixing (tracks 8 and 20 (Target))
- John Hanes – mixing engineering (tracks 6 and 13)
- Ingmar Carlson – mixing engineering (track 8)
- Josh Deguzman – mixing engineering (track 20 (Target))
- David Nakaji – mixing assistance (tracks 1, 3, 5, 7, 9, 11, 12, 14, 15, 17–19)
- Ben Milchev – mixing assistance (tracks 1, 3, 5, 7, 9, 11, 12, 14, 15, 17–19)
- Jacob Richards – mixing assistance (track 4)
- Rashawn Mclean – mixing assistance (track 4)
- Mike Seaberg – mixing assistance (track 4)
- Chris Athens – mastering (tracks 1, 3–19, 20 (Target), and 21 (Target))
- Brian "Big Bass" Gardner – mastering (track 2)

=== Artwork ===
- Marcus Piggott – photography
- Mert Alas – photography
- Jenna Marsh – creative direction
- Joe Perez – creative direction
- Katie McIntyre – type design, art direction assistance
- Allen Chiu – type design drawing

== Charts ==
=== Weekly charts ===
Chart (2018)	Peak position
Australian Albums (ARIA)	4
Austrian Albums (Ö3 Austria)	19
Belgian Albums (Ultratop Flanders)	11
Belgian Albums (Ultratop Wallonia)	8
Canadian Albums (Billboard)	2
Czech Albums (ČNS IFPI)	44
Danish Albums (Hitlisten)	18
Dutch Albums (Album Top 100)	8
Estonian Albums (Eesti Ekspress)	11
Finnish Albums (Suomen virallinen lista)	11
French Albums (SNEP)	7
German Albums (Offizielle Top 100)	18
Greek Albums (IFPI)	21
Hungarian Albums (MAHASZ)	31
Irish Albums (IRMA)	5
Italian Albums (FIMI)	19
Japanese Albums (Oricon)	80
New Zealand Albums (RMNZ)	8
Norwegian Albums (VG-lista)	9
Polish Albums (ZPAV)	27
Scottish Albums (Official Charts)	15
Slovak Albums (ČNS IFPI)	15
Spanish Albums (PROMUSICAE)	19
Swedish Albums (Sverigetopplistan)	15
Swiss Albums (Schweizer Hitparade)	5
UK Albums (Official Charts)	5
UK R&B Albums (Official Charts)	1
US Billboard 200	2
US Top R&B/Hip-Hop Albums (Billboard)	2

=== Year-end charts ===
Chart (2018)	Position
Australian Albums (ARIA)	69
Canadian Albums (Billboard)	40
French Albums (SNEP)	185
US Billboard 200	42
US Top R&B/Hip-Hop Albums (Billboard)	25

Chart (2019)	Position
US Billboard 200	96
US Top R&B/Hip-Hop Albums (Billboard)	67

== Certifications ==
Certifications for Queen
Region	Certification	Certified units/sales
Australia (ARIA)	Gold	35,000^{‡}
Canada (Music Canada)	2× Platinum	160,000^{‡}
France (SNEP)	Gold	50,000^{‡}
New Zealand (RMNZ)	Gold	7,500^{‡}
United Kingdom (BPI)	Gold	100,000^{‡}
United States (RIAA)	Platinum	1,000,000^{‡}
^{‡} Sales+streaming figures based on certification alone.

== Release history ==
Region	Date	Format	Label
Various	August 10, 2018	Digital download; streaming	Young Money; Cash Money; Republic
Various	August 17, 2018	CD	Young Money; Cash Money; Republic
Various	November 2018	LP; cassette	Young Money; Cash Money; Republic
Japan	September 26, 2018	CD	Universal Music Japan

== See also ==
- List of UK R&B Albums Chart number ones of 2018
