= Ganja Burn =

2018 song by Nicki Minaj

Song by Nicki Minaj

from the album Queen
- Released: August 10, 2018
- Studio: Glenwood Place Studios (Burbank, California); Larrabee Sound Studios (North Hollywood, California); Chris Athens Masters (Austin, Texas)
- Genre: Reggae fusion; hip hop
- Length: 4:54
- Label: Young Money; Cash Money
- Songwriter: Onika Maraj
- Producer: Jeremy Reid

Music video
- "Ganja Burn" on YouTube

"Ganja Burn" is a song recorded by rapper Nicki Minaj for her fourth album, Queen (2018), released through Young Money Entertainment and Cash Money Records. It was written by Minaj herself, alongside Jairus Mozee and Jeremy Reid; while its production was done by the latter. The song was recorded at Glenwood Place Studios, based in Burbank, California, Larrabee Sound Studios, based in North Hollywood, Los Angeles, and Chris Athens Masters, based in Austin, Texas. "Ganja Burn" is a reggae-inspired reggae fusion song, that lyrically finds Minaj defending her position in the music industry, while sending a message to other female rappers.

Upon the release of Queen, "Ganja Burn" received mixed reviews from music critics. Commercially, it charted at number 60 on the US Billboard Hot 100 and peaked at number 27 on the Hot R&B/Hip-Hop Songs chart. It also charted at number 43 on the Canadian Hot 100, number 13 on the New Zealand Hot Singles chart, and number 67 on the Scottish Singles Chart. The song was further promoted with an accompanying music video for the song directed by Mert and Marcus, which was released on August 13, 2018. It was also performed live on Minaj's Beats 1 Queen Radio show with Zane Lowe.

== Background and release ==
On August 10, 2018, Minaj revealed the final tracklist for her fourth album, Queen, that included an opening track titled "Ganja Burn". It premiered a few hours later as part of the album on all major music platforms. To promote it, as well as the 18 other tracks from the album, Minaj played the song live on her Beats 1 Queen Radio show with Zane Lowe and mentioned how it makes her emotional and gives her chills every time she listens to it, as it is one of her favorite songs on the album. The song was originally intended to be titled "Ganja Burn", however when submitting the track listing, Minaj accidentally wrote "Burns" instead. It has since been fixed on iTunes and Spotify. Additionally, the title itself is a double entendre as it is not only referring to the burning of marijuana, but it is also representing Nicki Minaj removing the negative factors in her life. Some lyrics quoted from the track were printed on the Queen merchandise, such as clothing, ashtrays, lighters, and rolling papers.

== Composition and lyrics ==
"Ganja Burn" is a reggae-inspired island-pop song. It uses a mid-tempo beat, that was described by The Atlantic as "evoking a beach party ruined by a cold snap." Minaj's recording engineer Big Juice explained the making process of the song saying, "[Minaj] probably freestyled 65%, 75% of the song. She got the beat from her producer J. Reid, head it, told me to load it up and ran in the booth. It was kind of the same with "Chun-Li". She was playing around, singing, “Ganja burn, ganja burn, ganja burn,” and then when she listened back, she was like, "that shit's hard!" I wanna say the hook is still the freestyle she laid when she first stepped in the booth. She pulled that shit out of thin air."

Lyrically, Minaj uses word play to defend her position in the music industry, "You made one dope beat, now you Kanye?/You got a nigga named Jay, now you 'Yoncé?/You got about three stacks, now you André?/...You gotta have real skill, gotta work for that," while sending a message about other female rappers in the music industry. The song has a simple chorus where Minaj sings about missing an ex, "Every time I get high, I just think about you," and croons, "Ganja burn, ganja burn, ganja burn.” She tweeted soon after the song's release about her dissatisfaction with it, "[I] realized that I hate how low I made the hook," and revealed that she wanted to swap it out.

== Critical reception ==
In The Hollywood Reporter, Jonny Coleman found that "Ganja Burns" was an arbitrary choice for the album, writing "[...] most of the sequencing seems arbitrary here, as if changes were being made up until the last minute and with little actual regard for flow." He concluded that the song was just "[a] filler which could have easily hit the cutting room floor." The Atlantic's Spencer Kornhaber, expressed his dissatisfaction with the verses-chorus matching with his confusion of the verses and chorus not connecting. In a positive review, Shamika Sanders of Billboard, praised Minaj's use of word play on the song, suggesting that Nicki may be using her wordplay to reference Cardi B in one line, which many fans have speculated it to be an intentional diss. Despite the theory, the lyrics are not specified toward Cardi and Minaj has not addressed this rumor.

== Music video ==
The initial draft for the music video was leaked online in early July 2018; A finished draft for the song later premiered on August 13, 2018. It was directed by Turkish-Welsh duo Mert and Marcus, composed of Mert Alaş and Marcus Piggott, who previously directed Minaj's video for "Regret in Your Tears" (2017). The video matches the theme of the album cover art, which was also designed by Mert and Marcus. The music video begins with title cards providing a backstory of enemies betraying the Queen, leading to the Queen rising back up and stronger than ever to prove herself to her enemies. The music video shows Minaj as an ancient queen in the desert, rising from the ground, insinuating that she is rising against the negativity despite those who have caused her to fall. Later in the music video, a ring of fire surrounds a group of people while Nicki morphs into royal attire, further building the story of the Queen (Nicki) thriving after burning out the negative people in her life.

== Credits and personnel ==
Credits and personnel adapted from Queen album liner notes.

Recording

- Recorded at Glenwood Place Studios, Burbank, California
- Mixed at Larrabee Sound Studios, North Hollywood, California
- Mastered at Chris Athen Masters, Austin, Texas

Personnel

- Nicki Minaj – vocals
- J. Reid – production
- Aubry "Big Juice" Delaine – record engineering
- Labrinth – record engineering
- Laura Bates – record engineering assistance
- Iván Jiménez – record engineering assistance
- Brian Judd – record engineering assistance
- Nick Valentin – record engineering assistance
- Jaycen Joshua – mixing
- David Nakaji – mixing assistance
- Ben Milchev – mixing assistance
- Jairus Mozee – guitars
- Chris Athens – mastering

== Charts ==
Chart (2018)	Peak position
Canada (Canadian Hot 100)	47
New Zealand Hot Singles (RMNZ)	13
Scotland Singles (OCC)	67
US Billboard Hot 100	60
US Hot R&B/Hip-Hop Songs (Billboard)	27
