= The Nicki Wrld Tour =

2019 concert tour by Nicki Minaj and Juice WRLD

- Continental tour by Nicki Minaj with Juice Wrld
- Promotional poster for the European leg
- Location: Europe
- Associated albums: Queen; Death Race for Love
- Start date: February 21, 2019
- End date: March 28, 2019
- Legs: 1
- No. of shows: 19
Nicki Minaj tour chronology
The Pinkprint Tour (2015–16)	The Nicki Wrld Tour (2019)	Pink Friday 2 World Tour (2024)
Juice Wrld tour chronology
The Nicki Wrld Tour (2019)	Death Race for Love Tour (2019)

The Nicki WRLD Tour was a concert tour by American rappers Nicki Minaj and Juice Wrld. The European tour supported Minaj's fourth studio album, Queen (2018), and Juice Wrld's second studio album, Death Race for Love (2019). The tour began on February 21, 2019, in Munich, Germany at Olympiahalle and concluded on March 28, 2019, in Geneva, Switzerland at SEG Geneva Arena, consisting of 19 shows.

The tour was originally titled the NickiHndrxx Tour with Future and was to include a North American leg which was set to begin in 2018. Juice Wrld was later announced as the replacement for Future as the co-headliner.

== Background ==
During an interview on Beats 1 Radio in April 2018, Minaj announced the release date of her fourth studio album Queen, as well as touring plans. The NickiHndrxx Tour was officially announced in June of the same year, with co-headliner Future. The tour was set to begin in early September, but the North American leg was later postponed as Minaj "decided to re-evaluate elements of production". In December 2018, Minaj announced that co-headliner Future withdrew, and was replaced by American rapper Juice Wrld, and that the tour could commence in Europe.

=== Musicians ===
- Nicki Minaj - main performer, vocals
- Omar Edwards - musical direction
- Adam Blackstone - musical direction
- Devine Evans - music programmer, composer
- Marcus Kincy - keyboards
- Dareck Cobbs - keyboards, music programmer, composer

== Set list ==
This set list is representative of the show in Munich, on February 21, 2019. It is not representative of all concerts for the duration of the tour.

1. "Majesty"
2. "Hard White"
3. "Feeling Myself"
4. "Only"
5. "Truffle Butter"
6. "Did It On'em"
7. "Beez in the Trap"
8. "Rake It Up"
9. "Dance (A$$)"
10. "Big Bank"
11. "Fefe"
12. "Anaconda"
13. "Roman's Revenge"
14. "Up All Night"
15. "Throw Sum Mo"
16. "Plain Jane"
17. "Itty Bitty Piggy"
18. "Your Love"
19. "Make Me Proud"
20. "Monster"
21. "Turn Me On"
22. "Whip It"
23. "Pound the Alarm"
24. "Starships"
25. "Where Them Girls At"
26. "All Things Go"
27. "Save Me"
28. "Right Thru Me"
29. "Come See About Me"
30. "Grand Piano"
31. "Bed" / "Side to Side"
32. "Swalla"
33. "Chun-Li"
34. "Moment 4 Life"

Encore

35. "The Night Is Still Young" (Interlude)
36. "Super Bass"

=== Notes ===
- During the shows in London, Birmingham and Manchester, Stylo G, Ms Banks and Lisa Mercedez joined Minaj on stage for performances, respectively.
- During the show in London, Minaj performed "Coco Chanel" and Yxng Bane joined her on stage to perform "Rihanna".
- During the Birmingham and Manchester shows, Lady Leshurr joined Minaj on stage to perform "Queen's Speech".

== Shows ==
List of concerts, showing date, city, country, venue, opening acts, tickets sold, amount of available tickets, and gross revenue
Date	City	Country	Venue	Opening act
Leg 1 — Europe
February 21, 2019	Munich	Germany	Olympiahalle	Zuna & Azet; Miami Yacine; Juice Wrld
February 24, 2019	Łódź	Poland	Atlas Arena	Smolasty; Juice Wrld
February 25, 2019	Budapest	Hungary	Budapest Sportarena	Juice Wrld
February 28, 2019	Berlin	Germany	Mercedes-Benz Arena	Zuna & Azet; Miami Yacine; Juice Wrld
March 1, 2019	Copenhagen	Denmark	Royal Arena	Vild Smith; Juice Wrld
March 3, 2019	Oslo	Norway	Oslo Spektrum	Kjartan Lauritzen; Juice Wrld
March 4, 2019	Stockholm	Sweden	Ericsson Globe	Lil Xan; Juice Wrld
March 6, 2019	Brussels	Belgium	Palais 12	Lord Gasmique; Juice Wrld
March 7, 2019	Paris	France	AccorHotels Arena	Koba LaD; Juice Wrld
March 11, 2019	London	England	The O_{2} Arena	Juice Wrld; Ray BLK
March 14, 2019	Birmingham	England	Arena Birmingham	Juice Wrld; Ray BLK
March 17, 2019	Glasgow	Scotland	SSE Hydro	Juice Wrld; Ray BLK
March 18, 2019	Manchester	England	Manchester Arena	Juice Wrld; Ray BLK
March 20, 2019	Esch-sur-Alzette	Luxembourg	Rockhal	Juice Wrld
March 22, 2019	Frankfurt	Germany	Festhalle	Zuna & Azet; Miami Yacine; Juice Wrld
March 23, 2019	Cologne	Germany	Lanxess Arena	Zuna & Azet; Miami Yacine; Juice Wrld
March 25, 2019	Amsterdam	Netherlands	Ziggo Dome	Josylvio; Juice Wrld
March 27, 2019	Zürich	Switzerland	Hallenstadion	Juice Wrld
March 28, 2019	Geneva	Switzerland	SEG Geneva Arena	Juice Wrld

== Cancelled shows ==
List of cancelled concerts, showing date, city, country, venue, and reason for cancellation
Date	City	Country	Venue	Reason
February 22, 2019	Bratislava	Slovakia	Ondrej Nepela Arena	Technical difficulties
March 9, 2019	Bordeaux	France	Arkéa Arena	Technical difficulties
March 15, 2019	Dublin	Ireland	3Arena	Adverse weather conditions
