= Bed (Nicki Minaj song) =

2018 single by Nicki Minaj featuring Ariana Grande

Single by Nicki Minaj featuring Ariana Grande

from the album Queen
- Released: June 14, 2018
- Recorded: 2018
- Studio: Criteria Studios (Miami, Florida)
- Genre: Pop, hip-hop
- Length: 3:09
- Label: Young Money; Cash Money; Republic
- Songwriters: Onika Maraj; Ben Diehl; Gamal Lewis; Brett Bailey; Mescon David Asher; Dwayne Chin-Quee
- Producers: Ben Billions; Beats Bailey; Supa Dups; Messy (co.)

Nicki Minaj singles chronology
"Big Bank" (2018)	"Bed" (2018)	"Boo'd Up" (remix) (2018)

Ariana Grande singles chronology
"Dance to This" (2018)	"Bed" (2018)	"God Is a Woman" (2018)

Music video
- "Bed" on YouTube

"Bed" is a song by Trinidadian rapper and singer Nicki Minaj, featuring American singer-songwriter Ariana Grande. It was released on June 14, 2018, by Young Money Entertainment and Cash Money Records as the second single from Minaj's fourth studio album Queen (2018). The song was produced by Ben Billions, Beats Bailey, Supa Dups, and Messy. It marks the fourth collaboration between Minaj and Grande. Commercially, the song peaked at number 42 on the US Billboard Hot 100, as well as reached the top 20 in Australia, Scotland, and the United Kingdom.

== Background and release ==
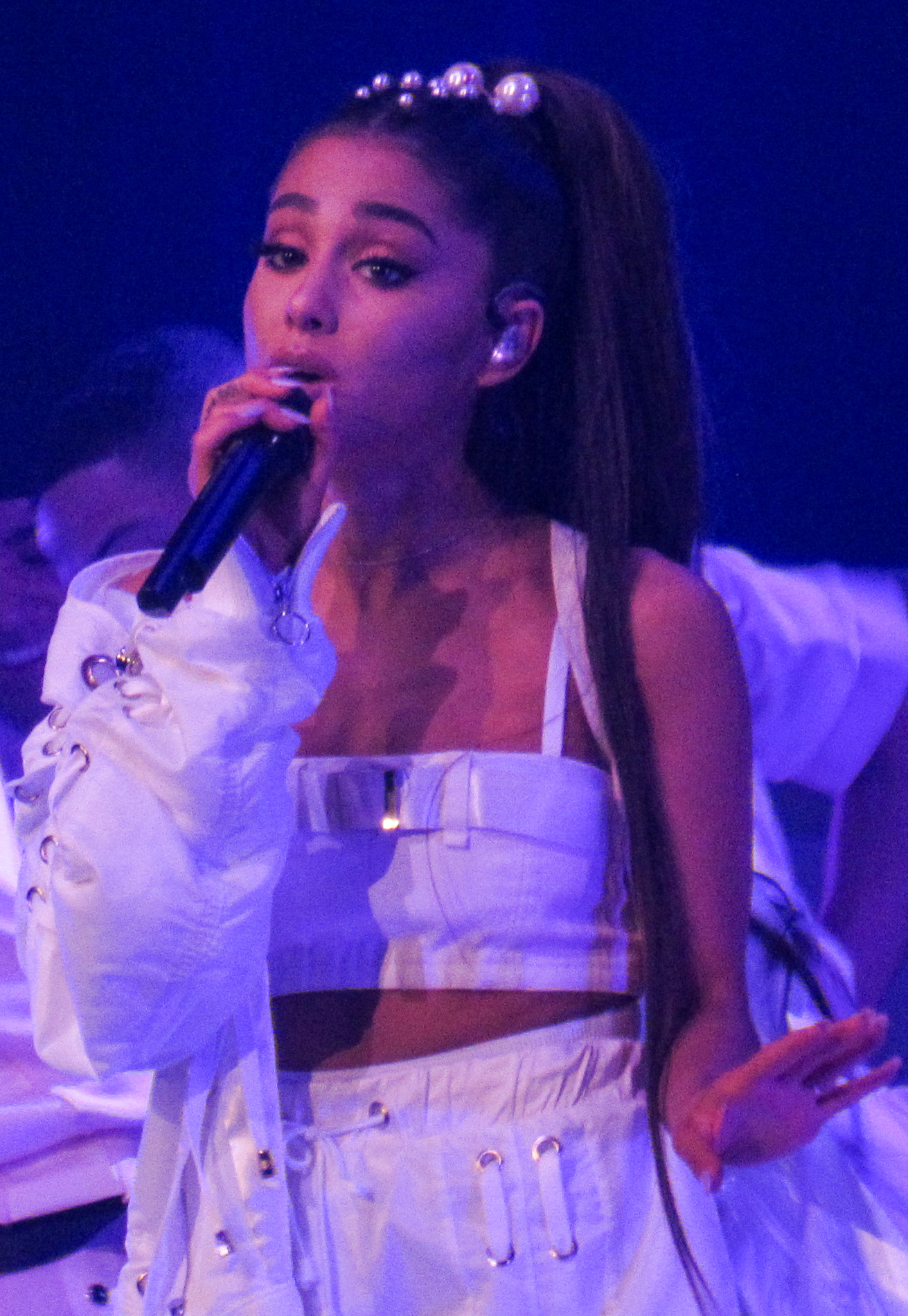
Grande (pictured) is a featured artist on "Bed".

Minaj and Grande collaborated on "Bang Bang" and "Get on Your Knees" in 2014. Ariana Grande released "Side to Side" featuring Nicki Minaj as the third single of her studio album Dangerous Woman (2016). It peaked at number four on the US Billboard Hot 100, becoming her first top-five single from the album in the chart. In May 2018, Grande revealed via Twitter that Minaj called her in the morning and recorded what would be their next musical collaboration. On June 4, Grande replied to a follower on the same social network suggesting that there would be more than one collaboration between her and Minaj to be released in 2018, the other one being "The Light Is Coming". On June 11, Minaj officially announced "Bed" as the second single from her upcoming fourth studio album Queen (2018). It was released on June 14 for digital download, along with the album pre-order. The single has an Instagram-influenced faded cover art, that features Minaj and Grande posing in a pool with bubbles.

== Composition and lyrics ==
"Bed" was written by Minaj with LunchMoney Lewis, Mescon David Asher, Supa Dups, Brett Bailey, and Ben Diehl, while its production was done by the latter three alongside Messy. The track is three minutes and nine seconds long. It is a downtempo-inspired pop ballad. It employs a minimalist, tropical-infused instrumental, that was noted to be similar to Troye Sivan's "Dance to This" (2018). According to Spin, the song is about escaping to be intimate with a lover, with a third verse about oral sex. It references Lil Wayne's Tha Carter III album (2008) and singer Zayn Malik, with whom she later collaborated, on "No Candle No Light".

== Critical reception ==
Joshua Copperman of Spin called the song "charming", "raunchy", and "forceful", and described the instrumental as "cloudy but decidedly pretty". He found it nearly identical to Troye Sivan's "Dance to This", which is "danceable" in opposite to "Bed" which "buries its groove in pure atmosphere". Mitch Findlay of HotNewHipHop said the song is "a breezy addition to Queen, an obligatory radio effort, tailor made for summer play." He adds that the track "serves as intimate companion piece to 'Rich Sex', and will no doubt appeal to a different set of ears." Mackenzie Cummings-Grady of Billboard finds that the "bouncy bop" nature of the song shows that "the album, like Minaj's previous efforts, will be a combination of club-ready pop and hardcore hip hop."

== Commercial performance ==
"Bed" debuted at number 43 on the US Billboard Hot 100 after a full week of tracking, with 19,000 downloads sold and 12 million streams. The song became Minaj's 91st entry on the chart, extending her record for most Hot 100 visits among women and tying James Brown for the seventh-best sum overall. It fell 24 positions to number 67 in its second week. In its fourth week, it rose to number 48, and later reached a peak of number 42 after her album Queen was released.

== Music video ==
=== Development and release ===
On June 14, 2018, Minaj and Grande shared a 15-second video teaser for "Bed" via their Twitter accounts. It shows the two artists in a pool, lounging around in a foam bath. On June 19, Minaj posted another one-minute preview of the music video on YouTube. On July 4, she revealed via Instagram that the video will premiere two days later. On July 5, she shared a quick behind-the-scenes look at the video on her social media. It shows her rolling around on a beach dressed up as a mermaid with a green wig. The full music video premiered on Minaj's official YouTube and Vevo accounts on July 6, 2018. It was directed by Hype Williams, who previously directed Minaj's videos for "Massive Attack" (2010), "Stupid Hoe" (2012), and "Va Va Voom" (2012). The video features guest appearances by American football players Odell Beckham Jr. and Brad Wing. Alongside the first video's release, Minaj announced a second version of the video that was meant to premiere a week later but was ultimately cancelled.

=== Synopsis ===
The music video opens with Minaj as a mermaid on the ocean shore. With the sun glistening on her body, she flaunts her curvy assets and green hair. She then retires to the bedroom in "sexy" lingerie as she rolls around in a mattress, before hitting the beach with Grande for some more fun in the sun. The two women later share strawberries with Beckham and Wing as their on-screen love interests on the beach. Grande does several showstopping looks of her own in the video, including white lingerie.

=== Controversy ===
On July 5, 2018, when the behind-the-scenes video for the song was released, rapper Azealia Banks posted a series of tweets criticizing Minaj for wearing a mermaid tail in the video. Banks suggested that Minaj stole that idea from her own aquatic-themed concepts dating back to her 2012 debut mixtape Fantasea.

== Credits and personnel ==
Credits and personnel adapted from Queen album liner notes.

Recording

- Recorded at Criteria Studios, Miami, Florida
- Mixed at MixStar Studios, Virginia Beach, Virginia
- Mastered at Chris Athen Masters, Austin, Texas

Personnel

- Nicki Minaj – vocals, songwriting
- Ariana Grande – featured vocals
- Ben Diehl – songwriting
- Gamal Lewis – songwriting
- Mescon David Asher – songwriting
- Ben Billions – production
- Brett "Beats" Bailey – production, songwriting
- Dwayne "Supa Dups" Chin-Quee – production, songwriting
- Messy – co-production
- Aubry "Big Juice" Delaine – record engineering
- Nick Valentin – record engineering assistance
- William Knauft – record engineering assistance
- Serban Ghenea – mixing
- John Hanes – mixing assistance
- Chris Athens – mastering

Photographer

- Alfredo Flores (cover art)

== Charts ==
Chart (2018)	Peak position
Australia (ARIA)	17
Austria (Ö3 Austria Top 40)	49
Belgium (Ultratip Bubbling Under Flanders)	6
Belgium (Ultratip Bubbling Under Wallonia)	17
Canada Hot 100 (Billboard)	30
Canada CHR/Top 40 (Billboard)	36
Czech Republic Singles Digital (ČNS IFPI)	30
Estonia (Eesti Ekspress)	22
Euro Digital Song Sales (Billboard)	18
France (SNEP)	105
Germany (GfK)	52
Greece International (IFPI)	6
Hungary (Single Top 40)	27
Hungary (Stream Top 40)	20
Ireland (IRMA)	22
Italy (FIMI)	91
Netherlands (Dutch Top 40 Tipparade)	12
Netherlands (Single Top 100)	47
New Zealand (Recorded Music NZ)	25
Norway (VG-lista)	34
Portugal (AFP)	27
Scottish Singles Sales (Official Charts)	19
Singapore (RIAS)	29
Slovakia Airplay (ČNS IFPI)	72
Slovakia Singles Digital (ČNS IFPI)	25
Spain (PROMUSICAE)	96
Sweden (Sverigetopplistan)	44
Switzerland (Schweizer Hitparade)	39
UK Singles (Official Charts)	20
US Billboard Hot 100	42
US Hot R&B/Hip-Hop Songs (Billboard)	19
US Pop Airplay (Billboard)	23
US Rhythmic Airplay (Billboard)	14

== Certifications ==
Region	Certification	Certified units/sales
Australia (ARIA)	Platinum	70,000^{‡}
Brazil (Pro-Música Brasil)	Platinum	40,000^{‡}
Canada (Music Canada)	Platinum	80,000^{‡}
New Zealand (RMNZ)	Platinum	30,000^{‡}
United Kingdom (BPI)	Gold	400,000^{‡}
United States (RIAA)	Gold	500,000^{‡}
^{‡} Sales+streaming figures based on certification alone.

== Release history ==
Region	Date	Format	Label	Ref.
Various	June 14, 2018	Digital download; streaming	Young Money; Cash Money	
United States	June 19, 2018	Top 40 radio	Young Money; Cash Money; Republic	
United States	June 19, 2018	Rhythmic contemporary	Young Money; Cash Money; Republic	
Italy	June 29, 2018	Contemporary hit radio	Universal	
