= Jaycen Joshua =

American audio engineer

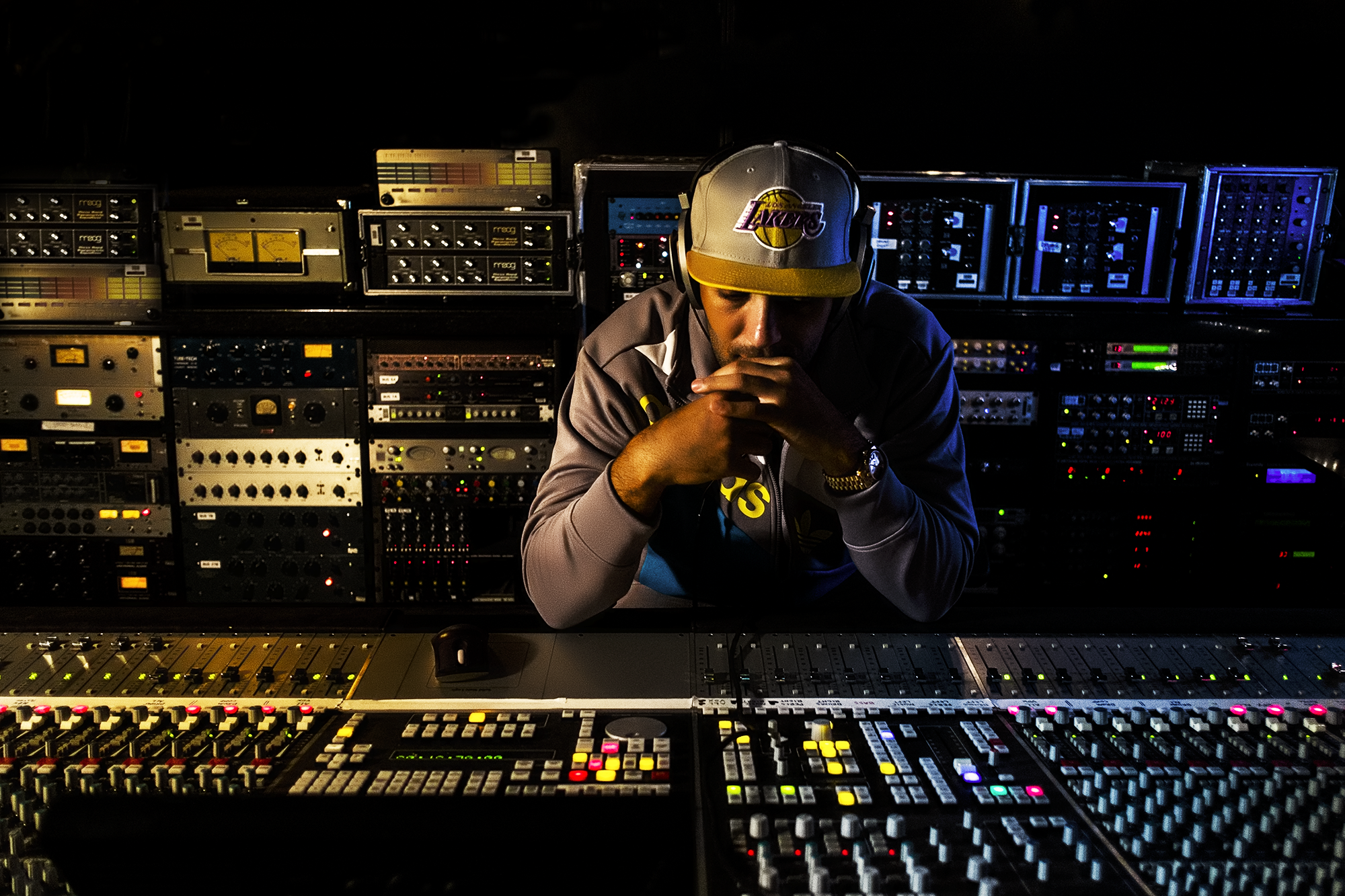
- Joshua in 2013

Background information
- Origin: Los Angeles, California, U.S.
- Occupations: Mixing engineer, producer
- Years active: 2004–present
- Website: jaycenjoshua.com

Jaycen Joshua is an American audio engineer and producer based in Los Angeles, California.

== Early life ==
Jaycen Joshua, born October 5, 1981 in Los Angeles, California, was introduced to the music industry at an early age. His professional development was significantly shaped by his godfather, Jheryl Busby, who was then the president of Motown Records. Under Busby’s guidance, Joshua began working at both MCA and Motown Records at the age of fifteen, gaining invaluable exposure to the operational and creative facets of the music business.

Initially, Joshua held positions in artist and repertoire (A&R) and marketing at DreamWorks, and later worked at MTV and Viacom in roles involving show development and advertising. Despite this corporate success, he developed a strong desire to engage directly with the technical side of music production. This led him to enroll in classes at The Los Angeles Recording Workshop. Within a day of attending, he recognized his deep affinity for audio mixing and made the decisive move to leave his corporate career to pursue music engineering full-time.

He began his practical training at Larrabee Recording Studios in North Hollywood, starting with basic duties such as studio maintenance and errands. His dedication and aptitude eventually earned him a position as assistant to the prominent mix engineer Dave Pensado. This mentorship culminated in the formation of their joint venture, "The Penua Project", in 2006.

== Musical career ==
Joshua started his mix career in 2005 under mentor Dave Pensado.
